= Elliott (disambiguation) =

Elliot (also spelled Elliott, Eliot, Eliott, or Elyot) is a surname and a masculine given name.

Elliot and variants may also refer to:

== Places ==
Australia

- Elliott, Northern Territory
- Elliott, Tasmania, a locality

Canada

- Elliot Lake, a city in Ontario
- Claud Elliott Lake Provincial Park, British Columbia
  - Claud Elliott Creek Ecological Reserve

South Africa

- Elliot, Eastern Cape, a town in the Eastern Cape

United Kingdom

- Elliot, Angus, a hamlet in Angus, Scotland
- Eliot College, Kent, a college of the University of Kent, named after T. S. Eliot
- Elliott Hudson College, a sixth form centre in Leeds, Yorkshire, England
- Elliott School, Putney, a comprehensive school in Putney, South London

United States

- Eliot, Maine
- Eliot House, residential house at Harvard College, named for Charles William Eliot
- Elliott, California, former settlement in San Joaquin County
- Elliot Park, Minneapolis, Minnesota
- Elliott, Illinois
- Elliott, Indiana
- Elliott, Iowa
- Elliott County, Kentucky
- Elliott, Missouri
- Elliott, North Dakota
- Eliot, Portland, Oregon
- Elliott (Pittsburgh), Pennsylvania
- Elliott, West Virginia
- Elliott Bay, Seattle, Washington

=== Buildings and structures ===
- Eliot (MBTA station) on the Green Line D branch in Boston
- Elliot Tower, a proposed residential skyscraper in New Zealand

== Companies, groups, and organizations ==
- Elliott Brothers (computer company)
- Elliott Company
- Elliott Management Corporation
- Elliott (band), an emo band from Louisville, Kentucky

== Vehicles ==
- USS Elliot, several ships of the United States Navy
- Elliott 6m, an Olympic sailing class boat

== Other uses ==
- Elliot Pecan, an American pecan variety
- Elliott wave principle, a form of stock market technical analysis
- Winter Storm Elliott (2022)
- Justice Elliott (disambiguation)
- Elliott, a nickname given to an Austrosaurus sauropod dinosaur fossil discovered in Queensland, Australia
- Elliott, used in botanical author citations for Stephen Elliott (botanist)
