= List of tallest buildings in Auckland =

Skyline of Auckland
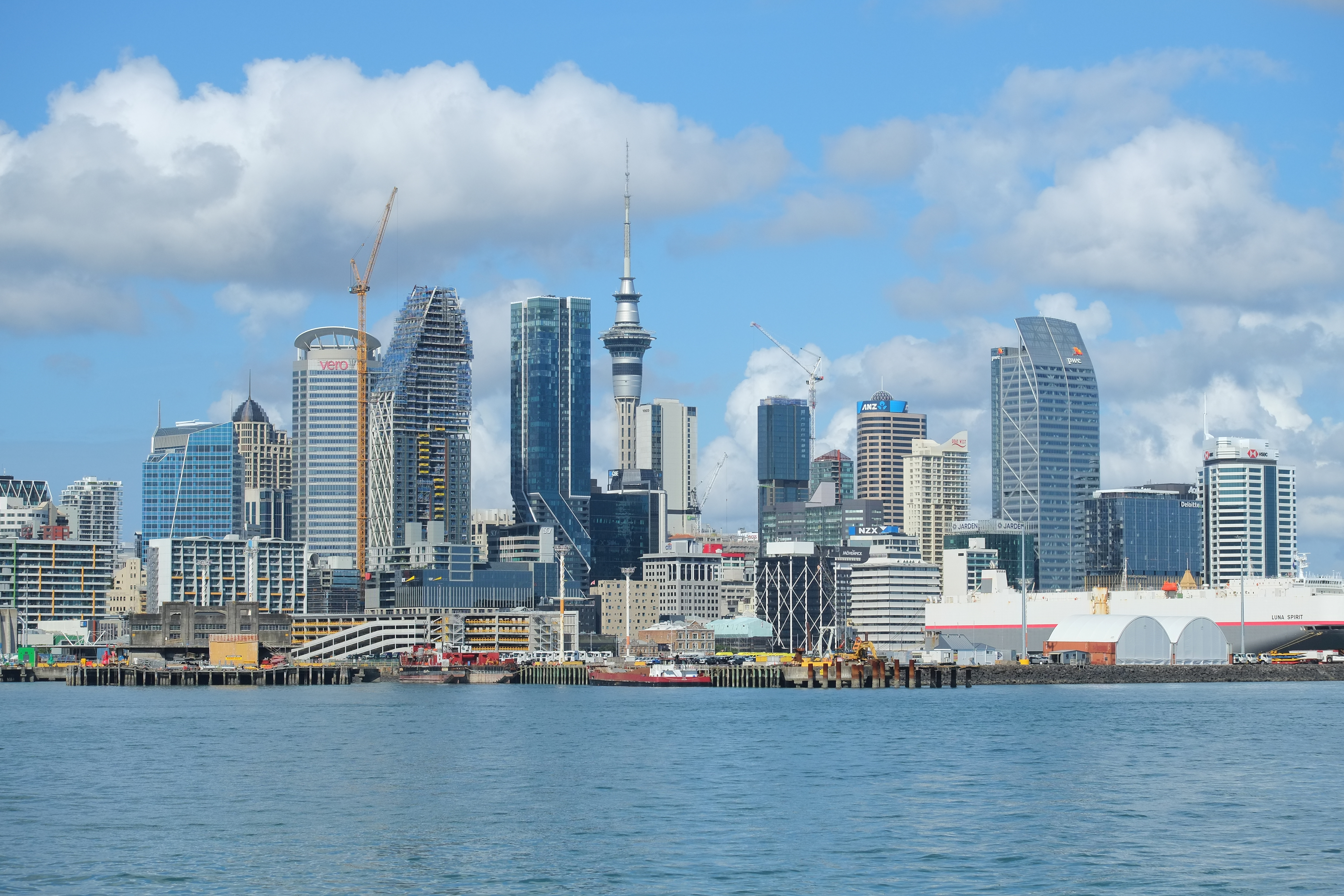
- Auckland CBD, looking southwest from Waitemata Harbour (2024)
- Tallest building: PwC Tower at Commercial Bay (2020)
- Tallest building height: 180 metres (590 ft)
- Tallest structure: Sky Tower
- Tallest structure height: 328 metres (1,076 ft)
- First 150 m+ building: ANZ Centre (1991)

Number of tall buildings (2026)
- Taller than 75 m (246 ft): 38
- Taller than 100 m (328 ft): 21
- Taller than 150 m (492 ft): 8

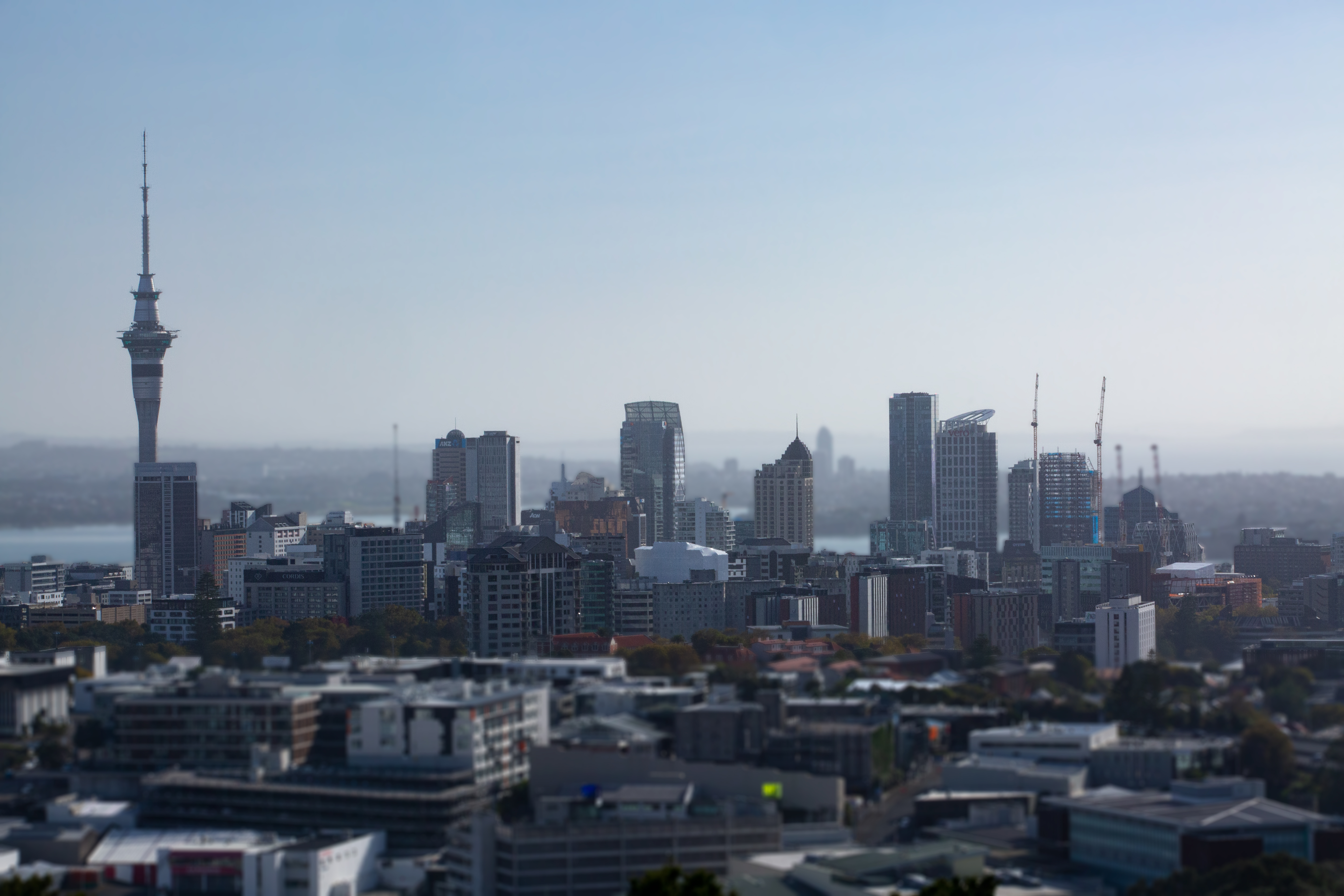
Auckland's CBD as seen from Mount Eden (2023)

Auckland is the largest city in New Zealand, with an urban area population of 1.5 million as of 2024. Many of Auckland's tallest buildings are also the tallest in all of New Zealand. Auckland's skyline is by far the largest in Oceania outside of Australia, with 21 buildings at least 100 metres (330 ft) in height as of 2026, five of which are taller than 150 metres (490 ft). The city's tallest building is PwC Tower at Commercial Bay, a 41-storey commercial skyscraper built in 2020 that rises to 180 metres (590 ft). However, the tallest free-standing structure in Auckland is the 328-metre (1,076 ft) Sky Tower, a communication and observation tower completed in 1997. It is the second-tallest free-standing structure in the Southern Hemisphere by pinnacle height, and is a prominent landmark on Auckland's skyline.

The first modern high-rise in Auckland is considered to be the FAI Building, an 11-storey office tower built in 1966. Since then, the skyline has successively grown taller. The Vero Centre (originally the Royal & SunAlliance Centre), a 170-metre (560 ft), 38-storey skyscraper, was the tallest building in Auckland for 20 years since its completion in 2000.

In the late 2010s, Auckland underwent a high-rise construction boom that led to several of the city's tallest buildings, including PwC Tower at Commercial Bay, The Pacifica, 51 Albert Street, and Voco Hotel and Holiday Inn. The boom has slowed down somewhat in the mid-2020s. Seascape, a residential development, is planned to be the tallest skyscraper in New Zealand at 187 metres (614 ft). Seascape broke ground in 2017 and is currently topped out, but the building remains unfinished as it was put on hold in 2024.

The majority of Auckland's high-rises are concentrated in a dense core within the Auckland central business district (CBD), on the northern edge of the Auckland isthmus. The main exception is a small group of high-rises in Takapuna, across the Waitematā Harbour. By far the tallest of these is Sentinel, a 150-metre (490 ft), 30-storey residential skyscraper built in 2007.

== History ==
Number of buildings by height in Auckland by the end of each year. Click on the legend to toggle a specific height on or off. View chart definition.

=== 1900s to 1970s ===
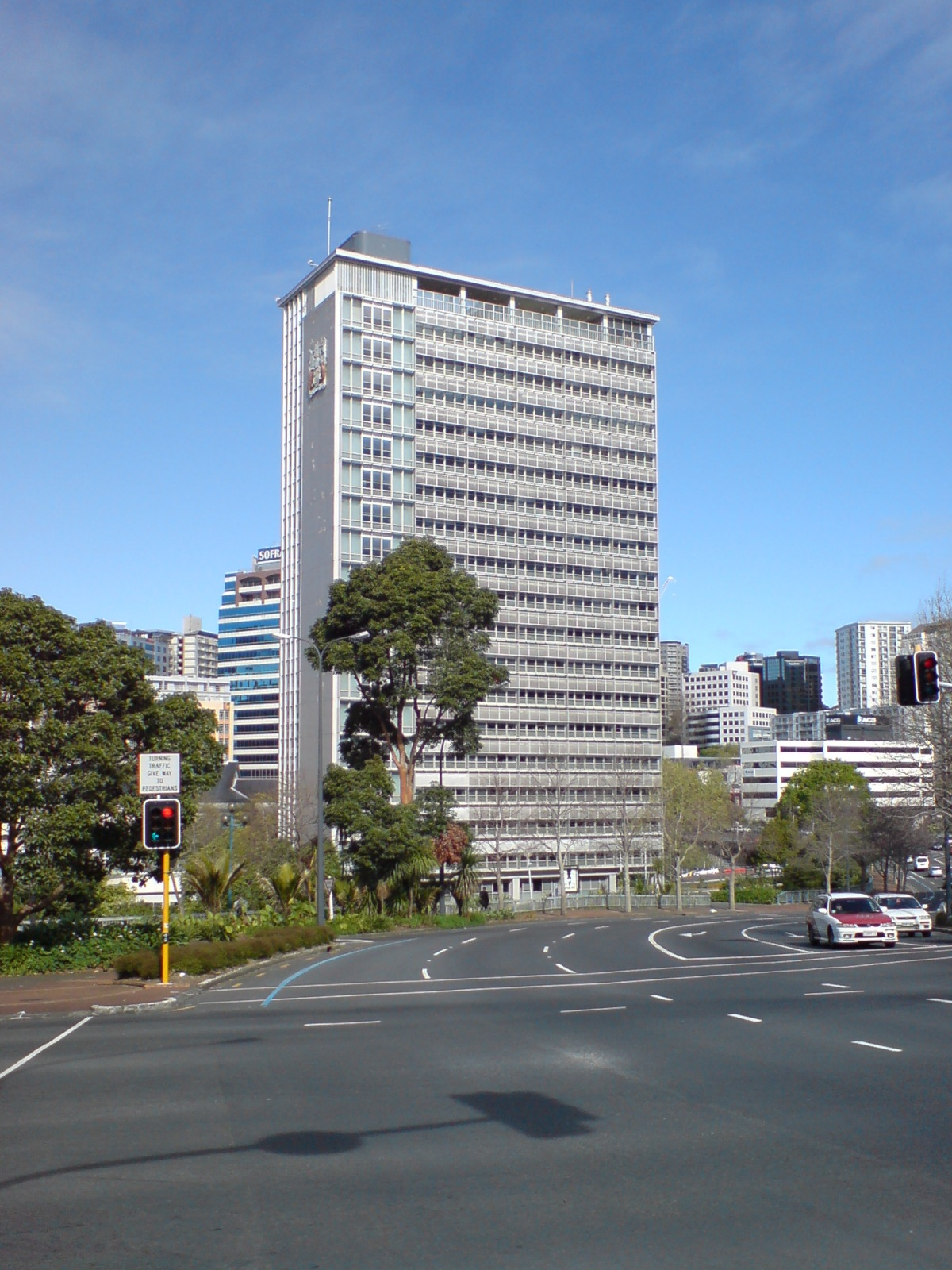
The modernist CAB Building (2007)

The title of Auckland's first skyscraper or high-rise has been given to various buildings over time, including the eight-storey Cathedral House on 48–52 Wyndham Street, which dates back to the early 1900s. The neoclassical building sits opposite the Cathedral of St Patrick and St Joseph. However, it was not the first "skyscraper" in New Zealand overall, a designation that belongs to the New Zealand Express Company Building in Dunedin.

Another building to be called Auckland's first skyscraper was the Civic Administration Building (now shortened to CAB Building), built in 1966. The 20-storey tower was the tallest building in Auckland at the time, and housed the Auckland City Council from its completion until the council left the building in 2014. An example of modernist architecture, it incorporated unique building techniques, such as flexible steel framing, aluminium extrusions, neoprene window seals and ceramic acoustic tiles.

In 1973, the first building in the city to surpass 80 metres (260 ft) in height, the Air New Zealand House, was completed. Built as the headquarters of Air New Zealand, the country's flag carrier, it dominated the Quay Street cityscape at the time. The building underwent an extensive renovation in 2017, enhancing its sustainability and recladding the exterior, as well as incorporating an InterContinental hotel. It is now known as the Deloitte Centre (not to be confused with 80 Queen Street, which was also known under that name). Another notable tower completed in the 1970s was West Tower, a 77-metre (253 ft), 18-storey office building. Its "aerofoil form" has been receive favorably, considered a "... part of Auckland’s architectural evolution from big town to a more elegant and sophisticated city".

=== 1980s to 1990s ===
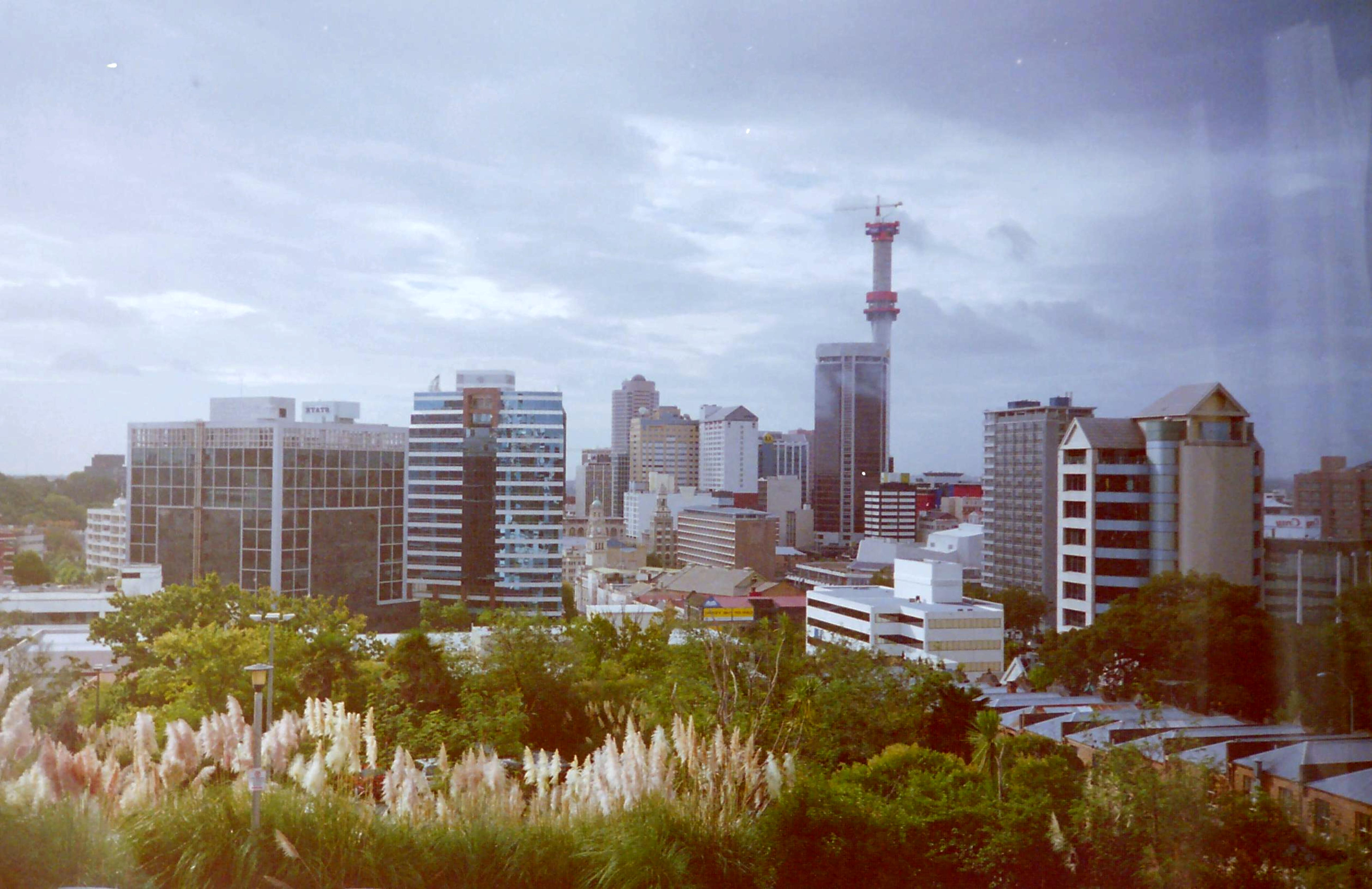
Auckland's skyline in 1995, with the Sky Tower seen under construction

The next two decades would see an uptick in high-rise construction, with commercial skyscrapers increasingly growing in height. The Aon Centre became the tallest building in the Auckland upon completion in 1980s, at 92 m (302 ft) tall. The QBE Centre surpassed it in 1986, becoming the first building to exceed 100 m (328 ft) in height in the city. In 1990s, Crowne Plaza would take the title, becoming the first tallest building in the city to be a hotel tower. A year later, it would lose it to the ANZ Centre, with surpassed the record height considerably at 151 m (495 ft) in height. The tower's upper floors offered panoramic views across Auckland.

Perhaps even more significant to Auckland's skyline, plans for an observation tower arose in the early 1990s, as part of a development for a casino and entertainment complex known as SkyCity. Construction on what became known as the Sky Tower began in 1994 and was finished in 1997. The tower is also used for communication. With a tip reaching 328 m (1,076 ft) tall, the tower is by far the tallest structure on the skyline. Since its completion, Sky Tower has been an iconic landmark on the skyline due to its height and design, attracting an average of 1,150 visitors per day (over 415,000 per year).

=== 2000s to present ===
The turn of the millennium would see the completion of Auckland's two tallest skyscrapers at the time, Metropolis, which also became the tallest residential building in New Zealand at 155 m (509 ft), and the Vero Centre, the tallest building in New Zealand overall at 170 m (560 ft). Metropolis marked an increase in the number and proportion of residential buildings on the skyline. While it was praised for its style and quality, the NZ$180 million cost of its construction also led to major financial fallout for its developer. Construction on the tallest building outside Auckland's city centre, Sentinel, was completed in 2008 in Takapuna, a northern suburb across the Waitematā Harbour. The idea of having a landmark building in Takapuna was considered favourably when the developer Cornerstone Group first proposed it in 2003. The Great Recession halted high-rise development in the city for a few years until the mid-2010s.

In the mid-2010s, another building boom began in the city centre, adding residential towers such as Queens Residences (2016), Park Residences (2017) and Victoria Residences (2018) to the skyline. Construction on the city's current tallest building, Commercial Bay, began in 2016 and was completed in 2020, during the COVID-19 pandemic. The skyscraper's anchor tenant is PwC, which gives it its other name of PwC Tower; the pandemic delayed the opening of the building's retail centre. The skyscraper is one of New Zealand's most sustainable high-rise office building and currently holds a 5 Star Green Building and Green Star Design Rating. Also completed in 2020 was The Pacifica, overtaking Metropolis to be New Zealand's tallest residential building. The top two floors of the building contain a penthouse that was originally listed for sale at NZ$40 million, which would have made it the most expensive apartment ever sold in New Zealand. This apartment was later split into four separate units.

The boom continued into the early 2020s with the completion of Voco Hotel and Holiday Inn and 51 Albert, both towers having a hotel component. Commercial Bay was set to be overtaken by the luxury residential skyscraper Seascape, which topped out in 2024 at a height of 187 m (613 ft). However, work on the building paused soon after, and its pointed roof sits unfinished on the skyline. The delay has been blamed on contract disputes between the developer, Shundi Customs, and the construction company. With few high-rises under construction as of 2025, some have regarded the recent high-rise boom to be over.

== Map of tallest buildings ==
This map displays the location of buildings taller than 100 m (328 ft) in Auckland. Each marker is coloured by the decade of the building's completion. All but one of these buildings are located in the Auckland CBD. The exception is Sentinel, which is located in Takapuna.

Buildings taller than 100 m (328 ft) in Auckland. An asterisk (*) next to the building's name indicates it is located outside the map.
- 1980s
- 1990s
- 2000s
- 2010s
- 2020s
1 PwC Tower at Commercial Bay
2 The Pacifica
3 Vero Centre
4 Metropolis
5 ANZ Centre
6 51 Albert
7 Voco Hotel and Holiday Inn
8 HSBC Tower
9 Auckland Harbour Suites
10 Shortland & Port
11 The Sentinel*
12 Quay West
13 Auckland Council Tower
14 Precinct Apartments
15 Crowne Plaza
16 Park Residences
17 Queens Residences
18 QBE Centre
19 SAP Tower
20 Phillips Fox Tower

== Tallest buildings ==
This lists ranks skyscrapers and high-rises in Auckland that stand at least 75 m (246 ft) tall as of 2026, based on standard height measurement. This includes spires and architectural details but does not include antenna masts. The “Year” column indicates the year of completion. Buildings tied in height are sorted by year of completion with earlier buildings ranked first, and then alphabetically. Non-inhabitable structures are included for ranking purposes.

Was the tallest building in Auckland upon completion

Rank	Name	Image	Location	Height m (ft)	Floors	Year	Purpose	Notes
N/A	Sky Tower		Victoria Street West 36°50′54″S 174°45′44″E	328 (1,076)	N/A	1997	Communication	Not a habitable building; included for comparison purposes. Tallest structure in New Zealand. The second tallest free-standing structure in the southern hemisphere by pinnacle height. Roof height is 236.5 metres.
1	PwC Tower at Commercial Bay		15 Customs Street West 36°50′39″S 174°45′57″E	180.1 (591)	41	2020	Office	Tallest building in New Zealand. Tallest building completed in Auckland in the 2020s.
2	The Pacifica		10 Commerce Street 36°50′45″S 174°46′05″E	178.7 (586)	57	2020	Residential	Tallest residential building in New Zealand.
3	Vero Centre		48 Shortland Street 36°50′48″S 174°46′06″E	170 (560)	38	2000	Office	Originally the Royal and Sun Alliance Tower. Tallest building in New Zealand from 2000 to 2020. Tallest building completed in Auckland in the 2000s.
4	51 Albert Street	–	51 Albert Street 36°50′47″S 174°45′51″E	160 (520)	41	2024	Mixed-use	Also known as Hotel Indigo.
5	Metropolis		1 Courthouse Lane 36°50′54″S 174°46′01″E	155 (509)	40	1999	Residential	Tallest building in New Zealand between 1999 and 2000, and the tallest residential building in New Zealand between 1999 and 2020. Roof height is 138m Tallest building completed in Auckland in the 1990s
6	ANZ Centre		25 Albert Street 36°50′44″S 174°45′52″E	153 (502)	35	1991	Office	Tallest building in New Zealand between 1991 and 1999. Originally the Coopers and Lybrand Tower.Roof height is 143m
7	Sentinel		3 Northcroft Street 36°47′22″S 174°46′17″E	150 (490)	30	2008	Residential	Top floor height is 120M, but the tip height is 150m. Tallest building in New Zealand outside the Auckland CBD, being in Takapuna.
8	Voco Hotel and Holiday Inn		13 Wyndham Street 36°50′49″S 174°45′53″E	141 (463)	39	2021	Hotel	On the site of the cancelled 1 Mills Lane development.
9	HSBC Tower		188 Quay Street 36°50′36″S 174°45′55″E	138 (453)	29	2002	Office	Formerly the PwC tower
10	Auckland Harbour Suites		16 Gore Street 36°50′46″S 174°46′08″E	130 (430)	37	2006	Mixed-use	Hotel and residential skyscraper. Also known as Oaks Residences and The Harbour City.
11	Shortland & Fort	–	88 Shortland Street 36°50′47″S 174°46′11″E	125 (410)	29	2005	Office	Formerly known as the Lumley Centre, NRM Tower, or its street address, 88 Shortland Street.
12	Quay West		8 Albert Street 36°50′42″S 174°45′56″E	120.1 (394)	32	1997	Hotel	
13	Auckland Council Tower		135 Albert Street 36°51′00″S 174°45′45″E	116 (381)	29	1991	Office	Originally the ASB Bank Centre
14	Precinct Apartments		6-8 Lorne Street 36°50′59″S 174°45′58″E	115 (377)	33	2003	Residential	
15	Crowne Plaza		128 Albert Street 36°50′59″S 174°45′47″E	110 (360)	29	1990	Hotel	Tallest building in Auckland and New Zealand from 1990 to 1991.
16	Park Residences		32 Swanson Street 36°50′46″S 174°45′51″E	109 (358)	33	2017	Residential	Tallest building completed in Auckland in the 2010s.
17	Queens Residences		8 Airedale Street 36°51′12″S 174°45′51″E	107 (351)	29	2016	Residential	
18	QBE Centre		125 Queen Street 36°50′47″S 174°45′56″E	106 (348)	28	1986	Office	Originally known as the BNZ tower. Tallest building in New Zealand from 1986 to 1990.
19	SAP Tower		151 Queen Street 36°50′49″S 174°45′55″E	104 (341)	29	1988	Office	Originally the headquarters of Fay Richwhite. Also known as IAG Tower.
20	Phillips Fox Tower		209 Queen Street 36°50′57″S 174°45′52″E	104 (341)	26	1987	Office	
21	80 Queen Street		80 Queen Street 36°50′46″S 174°46′00″E	100 (330)	23	2009	Office	Originally known as the Deloitte Centre.
22	Huawei Centre		120 Albert Street 36°50′58″S 174°45′49″E	95 (312)	26	1990	Office	Originally the Westpac tower. Also known as the BDO Tower, and the Rifleman Tower.
23	Crombie Lockwood Tower		191 Queen Street 36°50′55″S 174°45′54″E	92 (302)	24	1986	Office	Previously known as Qantas House, Telstra Saturn House, and Stock Exchange Building.
24	The Residences		26 Albert Street 36°50′44″S 174°45′55″E	92 (302)	22	2008	Hotel	Previously known as The Regent Hotel and Stamford Plaza Auckland. Originally built to a height of 11 floors in 1984, an additional 11 floors were added to the hotel in 2008, bringing the total to 22.
25	Aon Centre		29 Customs Street West 36°50′38″S 174°45′54″E	92 (302)	22	1980	Office	Also known as the AMP Tower.
26	CityLife Auckland		171 Queen Street 36°50′52″S 174°45′54″E	90 (300)	26	1998	Hotel	
27	City Gardens		76 Albert Street 36°50′52″S 174°45′52″E	90 (300)	28	2004	Residential	
28	Gen-i Tower		66 Wyndham Street 36°50′49″S 174°45′46″E	85 (279)	22	2000	Office	Also known as Chorus House.
29	AIG Building		41 Shortland Street 36°50′51″S 174°46′04″E	84 (276)	20	1995	Office	Also known as the AXA Tower. Originally the National Mutual building.
30	Deloitte Centre		1 Queen Street 36°50′36″S 174°46′00″E	81 (266)	20	1973	Office	Former HSBC Building. Originally was the Air New Zealand House or Air New Zealand building when built. It underwent a renovation in 2024 and now includes an Intercontinental Hotel. Tallest building completed in Auckland in the 1970s
31	Victoria Residences		75 Victoria Street West 36°50′53″S 174°45′46″E	80 (260)	26	2018	Residential	
32	Spencer on Byron Hotel	–	9-17 Byron Avenue 36°47′27″S 174°46′16″E	80 (260)	22	2001	Hotel	
33	Barclay Suites		74 Albert Street 36°50′50″S 174°45′51″E	78 (256)	25	2006	Residential	
34	1 Albert Street		1 Albert Street 36°50′40″S 174°45′54″E	77 (253)	18	1974	Office	Formerly known as West Plaza
35	Arthur Andersen Tower		205 Queen Street 36°50′57″S 174°45′54″E	77 (253)	21	1988	Office	Also known as the Arthur Andreson Tower.
36	SkyCity Grand Hotel		90 Federal Street 36°50′58″S 174°45′46″E	75 (246)	24	2004	Hotel	
37	Altitude Apartments		34 Kingston Street 36°50′51″S 174°45′44″E	75 (246)	22	2004	Residential	
38	Telco Building		16 Kingston Street 36°50′52″S 174°45′47″E	75 (246)	18	2000	Office	Also known as Telecom Tower, and previously known as Federal Chambers

== Tallest under construction or proposed ==
=== Under construction ===
As of 2026, there are no high-rises under active construction in Auckland that are expected to be at least 75 (246 ft) tall, based on standard height measurement. The residential development Seascape began construction in 2017 and topped out in 2024, but is currently on hold. It would become the tallest building in Auckland if it is eventually completed.

=== Proposed ===
The following table ranks proposed and approved high-rises in Auckland that are expected to be at least 75 m (246 ft) tall as of 2026, based on standard height measurement. The “Year” column indicates the expected year of completion. A dash “–“ indicates information about the building's height or year of completion is not available. Buildings whose construction is on hold are also included.

Name	Height m (ft)	Floors	Year	Purpose	Status	Notes
Pūmanawa Downtown West (Tower 1)	227 (745)	56	–	Mixed-use	On hold	Would be Auckland's tallest building if built.
NDG Auckland Centre	209 (686)	52	–	Mixed-use	On hold	Residential, hotel and retail.
Seascape	187 (614)	56	–	Residential	On hold	
65 Federal Street	183 (600)	55	–	Mixed-use	On hold	
M&L Auckland Central (5–15 Albert Street)	167 (548)	37	–	Office	On hold	
Pūmanawa Downtown West (Tower 2)	164 (538)	41	–	Mixed-use	On hold	
14 Huron Street, Takapuna	152 (498)	39	2030	Build to Rent	Approved	Gasometer Site. Construction commences 2027, opening 2030.
St James Suites	134 (440)	39	–	Residential	Proposed	

== Tallest unbuilt ==
The following table ranks the tallest proposed skyscrapers in Auckland that were ultimately never built. The Height column indicates the intended height of the proposed buildings.

Name	Height m (ft)	Floors	Notes
Elliott Tower	232 (761)	67	This project was approved, but construction never went ahead, and the site was later sold.
1 Mills Lane	190 (620)	34	Cancelled in 2017, replaced by plan for Holiday Inn Express/EVEN Hotels
St James Suites	136 (446)	36	On hold; construction started in 2016 but project has been halted. There is a new proposal for the site.

== Timeline of tallest buildings ==
Name	Image	Years as tallest	Height m (ft)	Floors	Notes
MLC Building		1957–1962	–	9	
FAI Building		1962–1966	50.5 (166)	11	Considered Aucklands first "modern skyscraper"
The CAB		1966–1973	71 (233)	20	Originally the Civic Administration Building
Deloitte Centre		1973–1980	81 (266)	20	Former HSBC Building. Also known as 1 Queen Street.
Aon Centre		1980–1986	92 (302)	22	Previously called AMP Tower, Quay Tower, and Air New Zealand Building
QBE Centre		1986–1990	106 (348)	28	Former BNZ Centre
Crowne Plaza		1990–1991	110 (360)	29	
ANZ Centre		1991–1999	153 (502)	35	Also the tallest structure in Auckland until surpassed by the Sky Tower (which is not a skyscaper) in 1996
The Metropolis		1999–2000	155 (509)	40	
Vero Centre		2000–2019	172 (564)	38	Held the title of the tallest building in Auckland for the longest period of any building since 1962.
PwC Tower at Commercial Bay		2019–2024	180 (590)	41	Auckland's current tallest completed building.
Seascape		2024–present	187 (614)	56	Auckland's current tallest building and the tallest building in the Polynesian Triangle region. Topped out in 2024, currently unfinished.

== Gallery ==
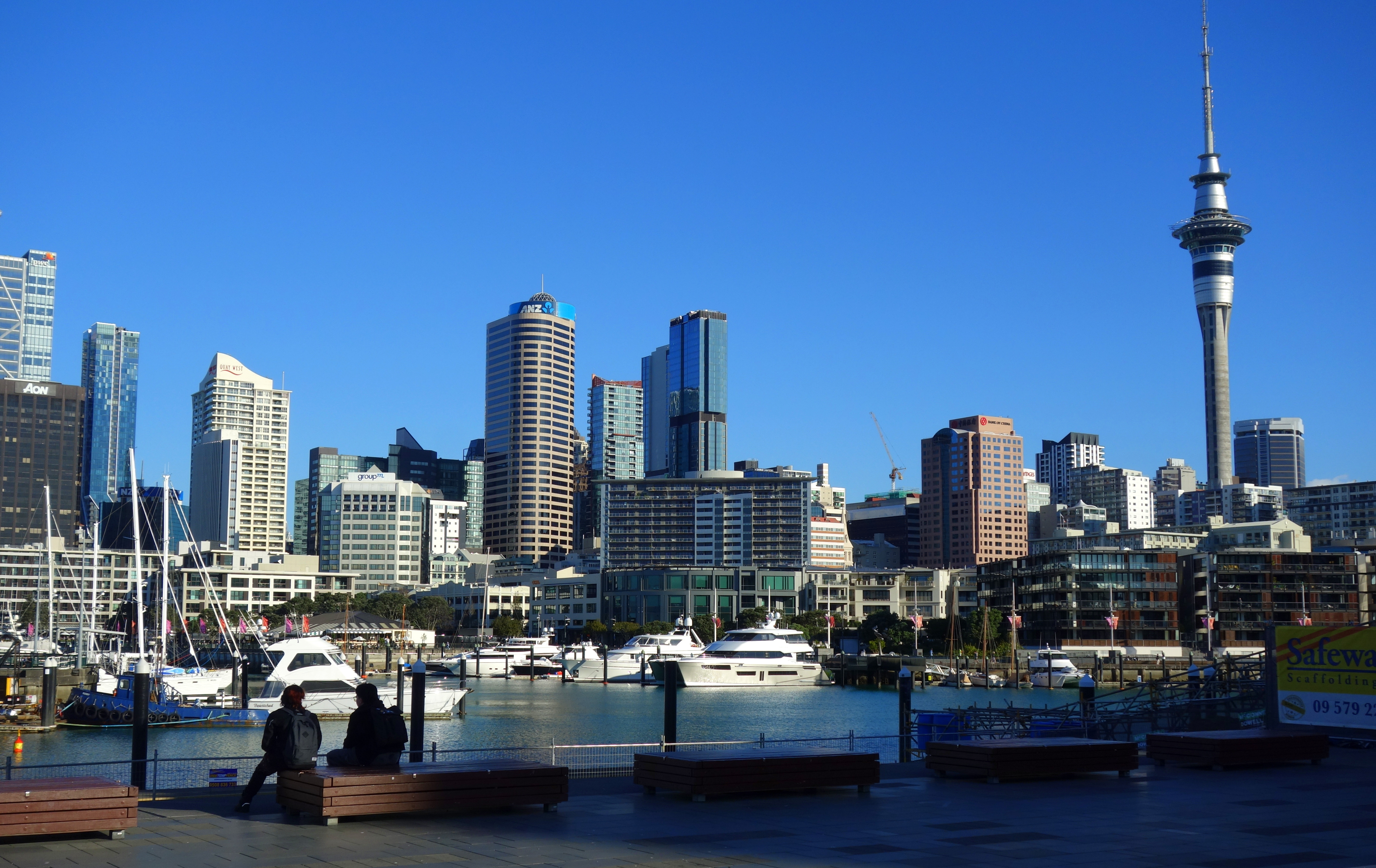
Auckland's skyline from Wynyard Quarter in 2024

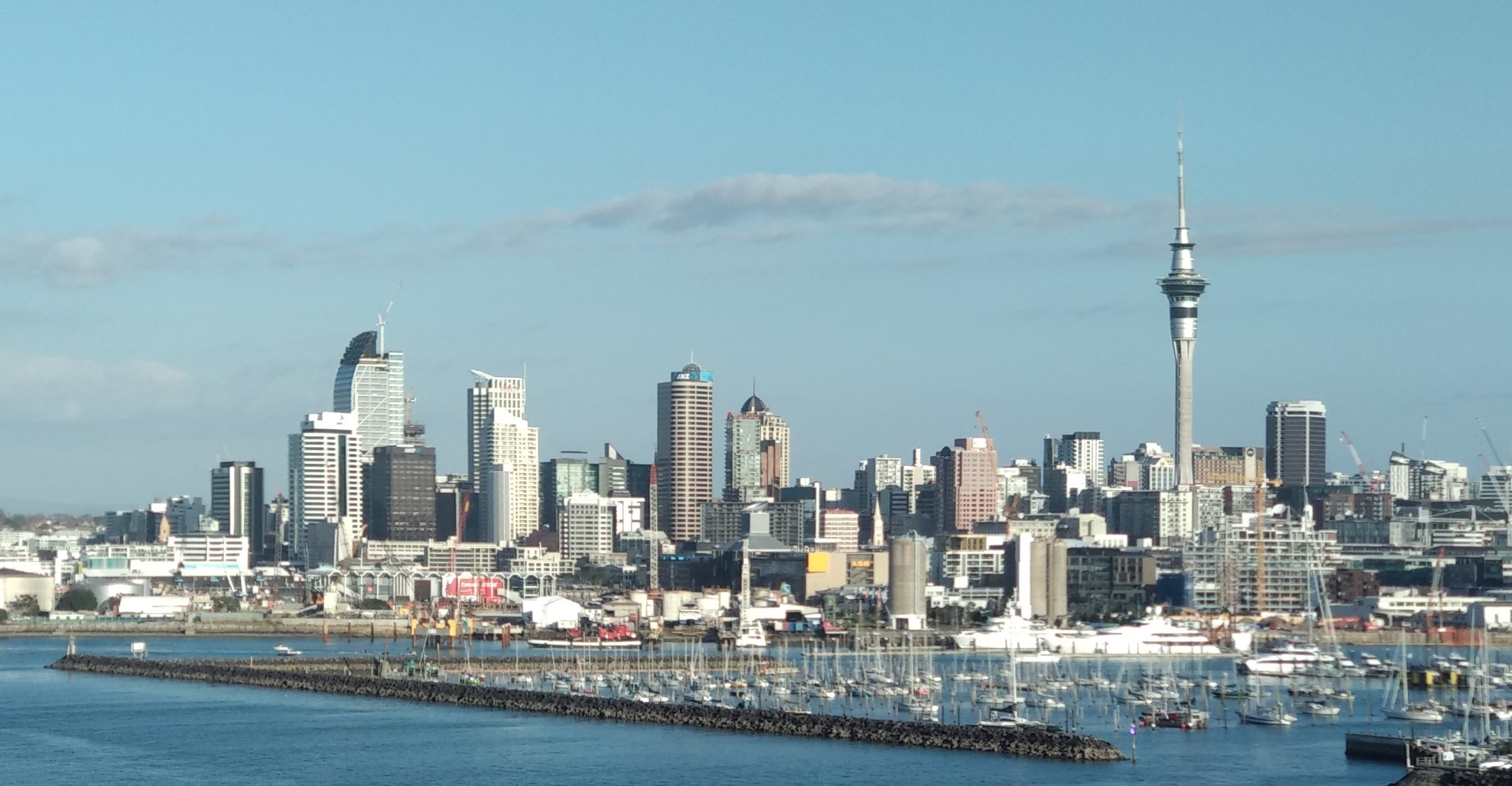
Auckland from the Harbour Bridge

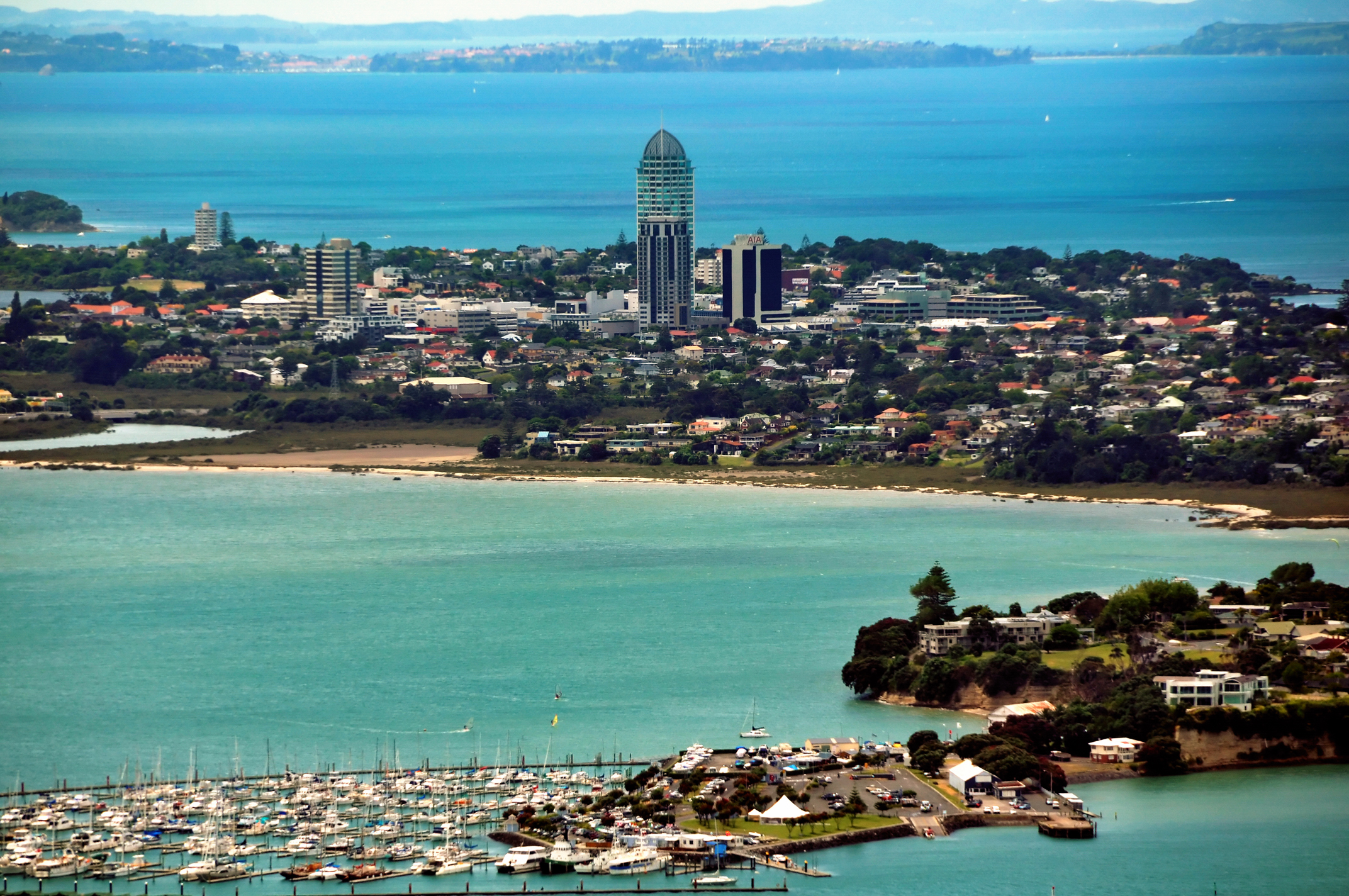
The small skyline of Takapuna viewed from the Sky Tower

== See also ==
- List of tallest buildings in Christchurch
- List of tallest buildings in Wellington
- List of tallest buildings in Oceania
