= The Pacifica (Auckland) =

Luxury residential skyscraper in Auckland, New Zealand

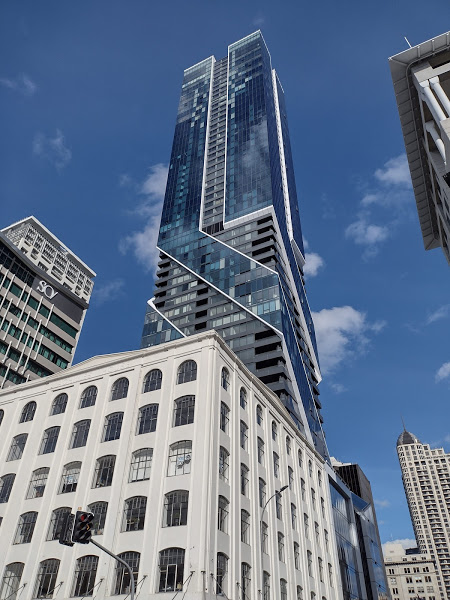
- The Pacifica in May 2021

General information
- Status: Completed
- Type: Residential
- Architectural style: Contemporary
- Location: 10-12 Commerce Street, Auckland, New Zealand
- Coordinates: 36°50′44.0″S 174°46′04.9″E
- Construction started: 2017
- Completed: 2020
- Cost: NZ$300,000,000

Height
- Roof: 178.7 m (586 ft)

Technical details
- Structural system: Concrete
- Floor count: 57
- Floor area: 44,138 m^{2} (475,097 sq ft)
- Lifts/elevators: 5

Design and construction
- Architecture firm: Plus Architecture
- Developer: Hengyi Pacific
- Structural engineer: BGT Structures
- Main contractor: Icon Construction

Website
- https://www.pacifica.nz/

The Pacifica is a luxury residential skyscraper in Auckland, New Zealand. Constructed between 2017 and 2020, the building stands at a height of 178.7 m (586 ft) and has 57 floors. It is currently the third-tallest building in New Zealand after Seascape and PwC Tower at Commercial Bay, as well as the second-tallest completed building in the country.

The top two floors of the building contain a penthouse originally listed for sale at NZ$40 million, which would have made it the most expensive apartment ever sold in New Zealand. This apartment was later divided into separate units.

In June 2021, The Pacifica won the awards for Best Residential High-Rise Development New Zealand and Best Apartment / Condominium New Zealand at the International Property Awards.

== Gallery ==
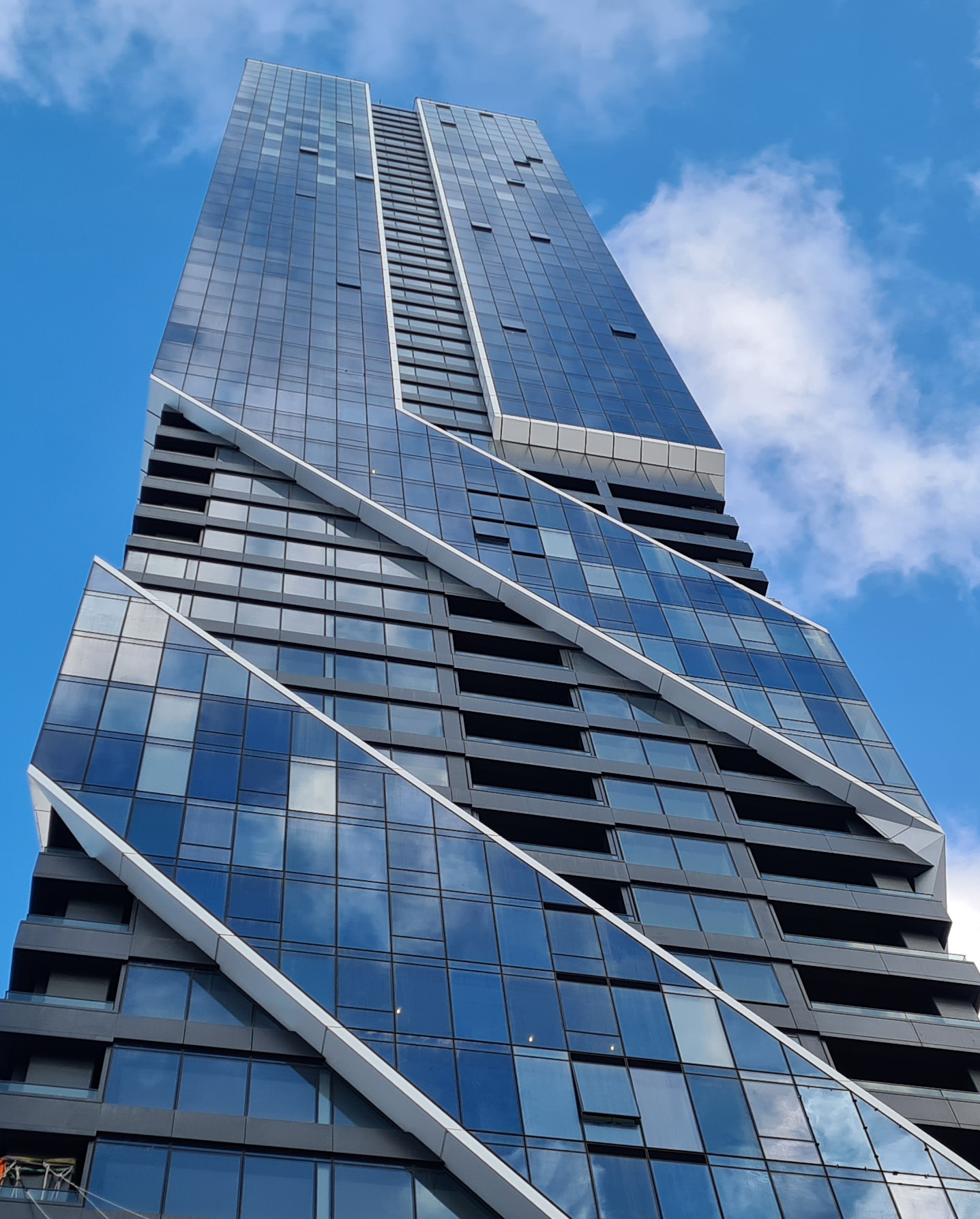
The Pacifica in April 2021

The Pacifica under construction in February 2020

The Pacifica under construction in September 2019

== See also ==
- List of tallest buildings in Auckland
- List of tallest structures in New Zealand
- List of tallest buildings in Oceania
