= 1 Albert Street, Auckland =

Building in Auckland, New Zealand

1 Albert Street
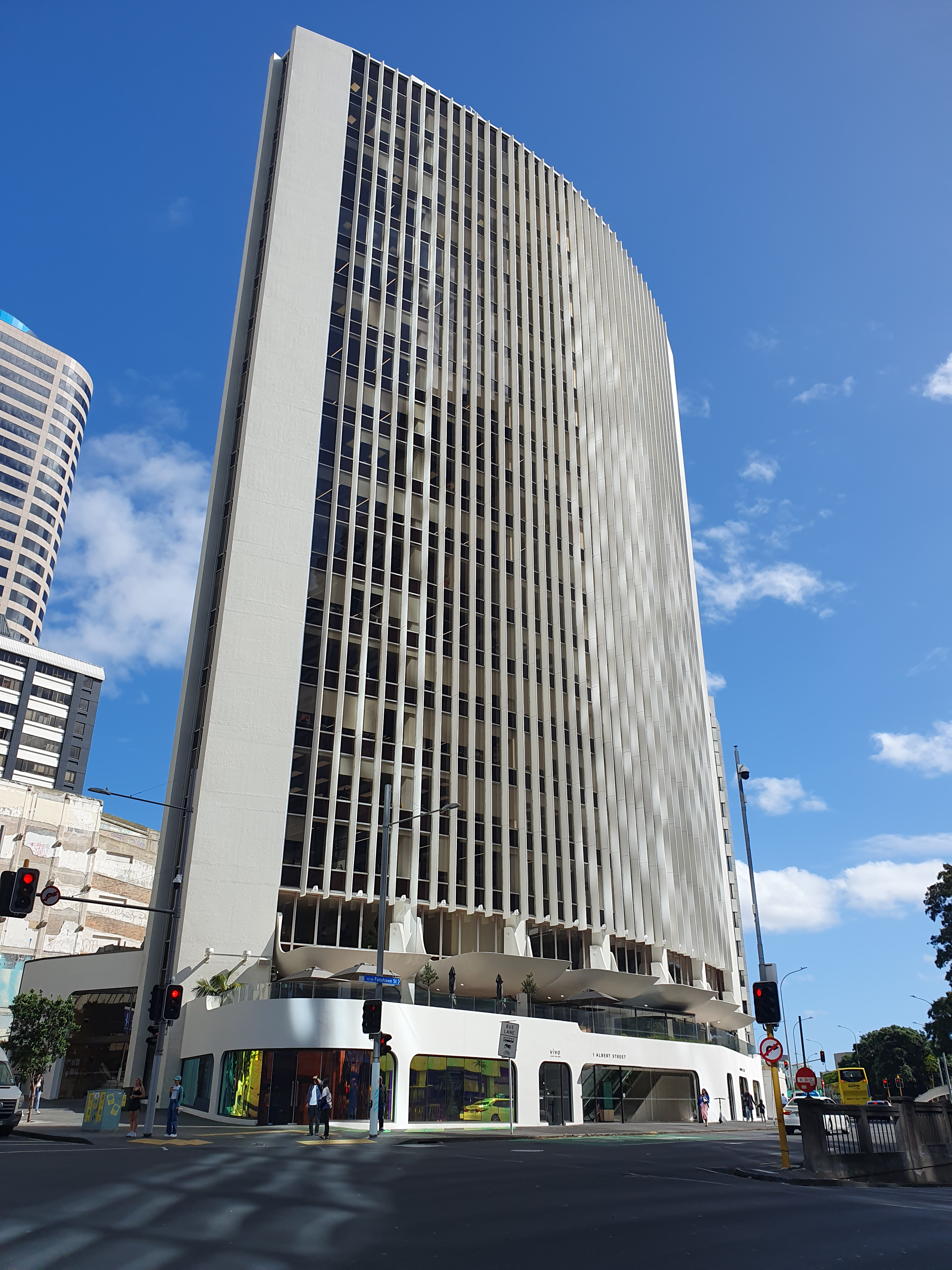
- Interactive map of the 1 Albert Street area
- Former names: West Plaza

General information
- Architectural style: Modernism
- Location: 1 Albert Street, Auckland, New Zealand
- Coordinates: 36.84447°S 174.76488°E
- Completed: 1974

Height
- Height: 74 metres (243 ft)

Technical details
- Floor count: 20

Design and construction
- Architect: Neville Price

1 Albert Street, previously known as West Plaza, is a high-rise commercial building in Auckland, New Zealand, demonstrating the influence of 20th-century modernism in that country. Completed in 1974, the building was designed by architect Neville Price, and reflects the nautical environment of downtown Auckland.

== History ==
West Plaza was designed by Neville Price under the Price Adams Dodd Partnership in 1970 and building work was completed in 1974. At the time, it greatly contrasted with other buildings in downtown Auckland, such as its neighbouring Victorian-style Customs House. It received a mostly positive reception and was viewed as, "a big part of Auckland's architectural evolution from a big town to a more elegant and sophisticated city". However, the building was criticised for too closely resembling Gio Ponti's Pirelli Tower in Milan, with which it shares many design features.

Modernism in New Zealand took off in the 1950s and 1960s during the post-WWII economic boom. Neville Price's West Plaza reflected the tenets of the modern movement while also responding to its local, physical environment.

== Architecture ==
The high-rise building stands at 74 metres (243 ft). As of 2026, it is listed as the 34th tallest building in Auckland and the 55th tallest building in New Zealand.

Structurally, the building consists of a podium, which forms the ground floor entrance area. Reinforced concrete columns at the building's perimeter, reinforced concrete beams supporting each floor, and a vertical core located at the rear façade, result in floor plates free of interior columns.

Sitting above the podium, a notable feature of the building are concrete scoops, which collect rain and deflect down draughts. Vertical concrete fins rise above the concrete scoops.

Many design features of West Plaza respond to and interact with its environment. The building's thin, oval form aligns with its narrow corner site. Its sculptural emulation of a vertical foil reflects its maritime surroundings and the vertical slats evoke masts, representing the notion of Auckland as the 'City of Sails'.

== Renovation ==
Agile Engineering re-developed West Plaza between 2019 and 2020.

Ignite Architects was approached in 2022 to renovate the building, to meet evolving workplace requirements. The firm worked alongside Neville Price to maintain the original design vision. The renovations saw the main entrance move to Fanshawe Street to attract more foot traffic. The podium was also a main focus, with its open areas that curve out against the street equipped with timber decking and slatted banquettes, recalling the maritime aspects of Price's original design.

== Recognition ==
In 2005, the building received an Enduring Architecture Award in the New Zealand Institute of Architects national awards. In 2023, at the Property Council New Zealand's Property Industry Awards, the renovated building was judged the winner in the commercial office property category. Also in 2023, it received a bronze award in the repurposed spaces / adaptive reuse category of the Designers Institute of New Zealand's Best Awards.

== Gallery ==
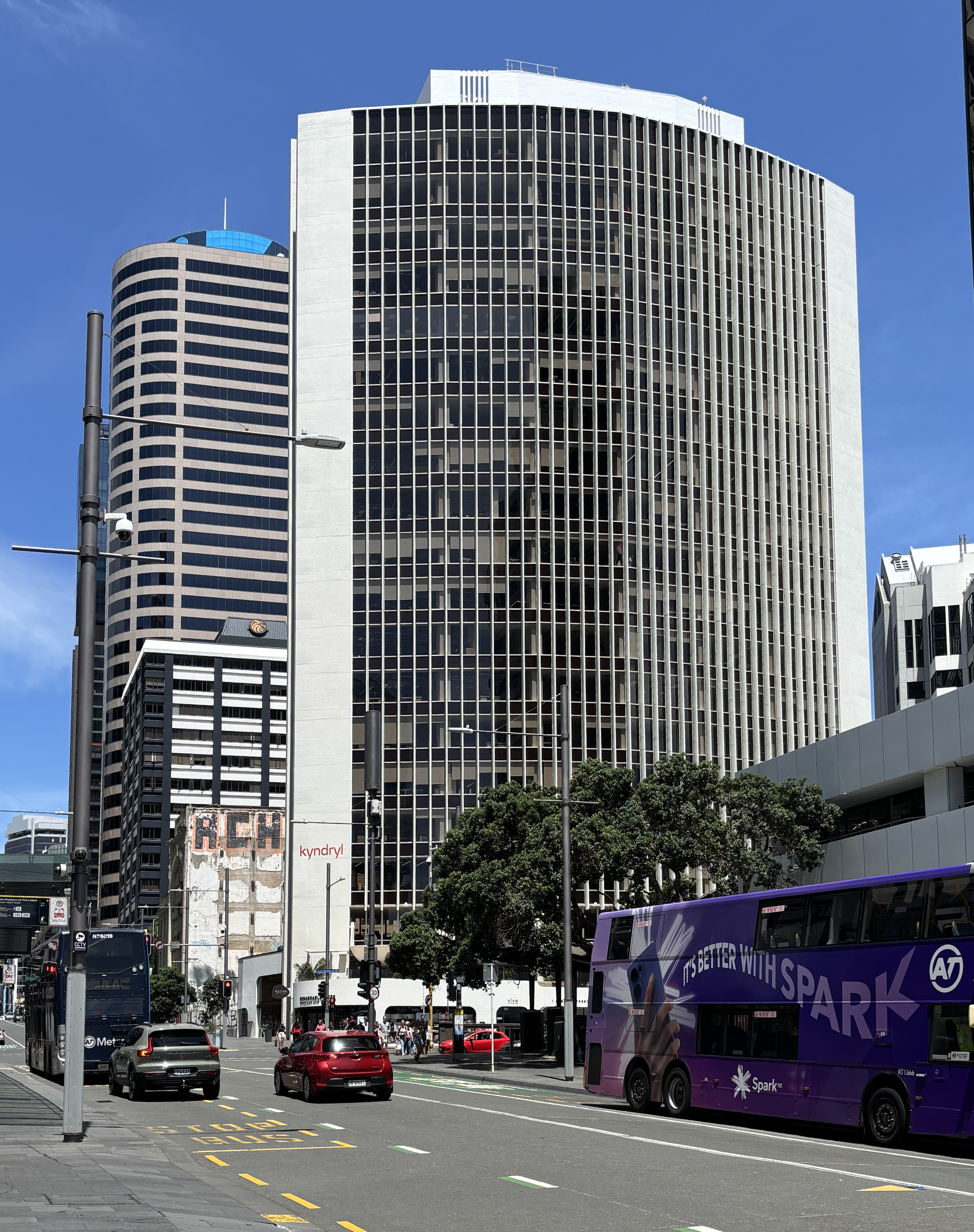
View from lower Albert Street

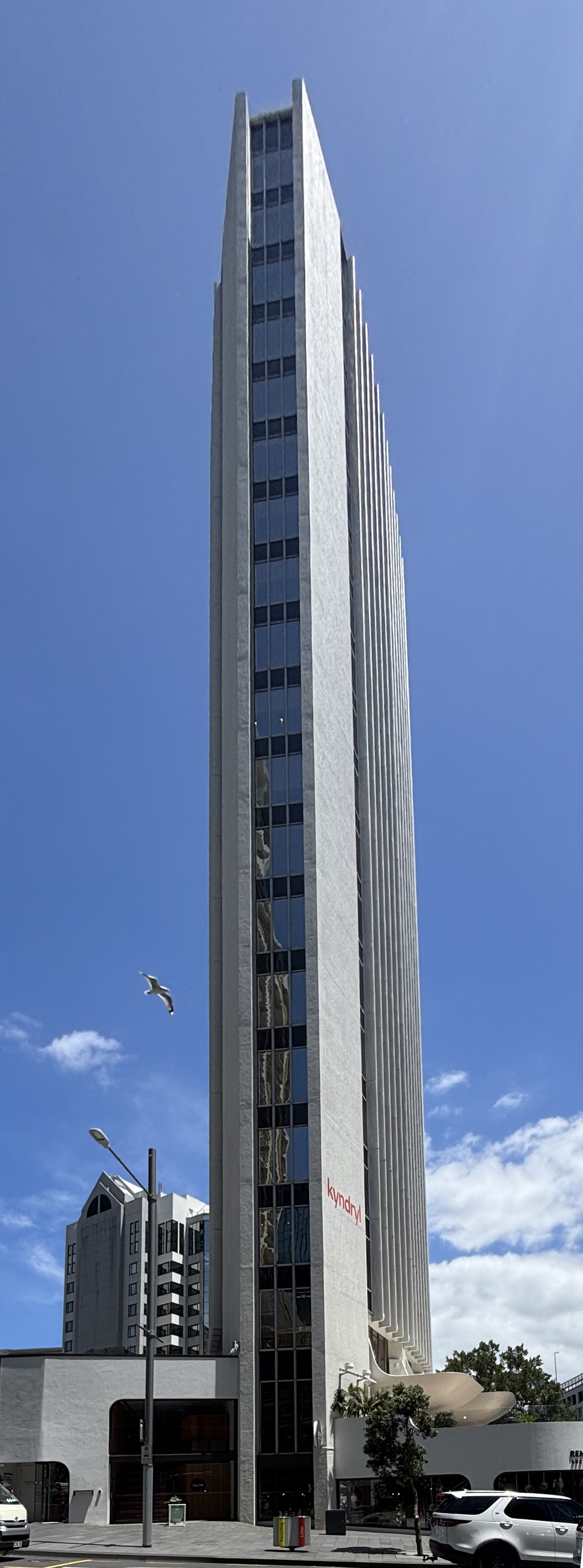
Side profile

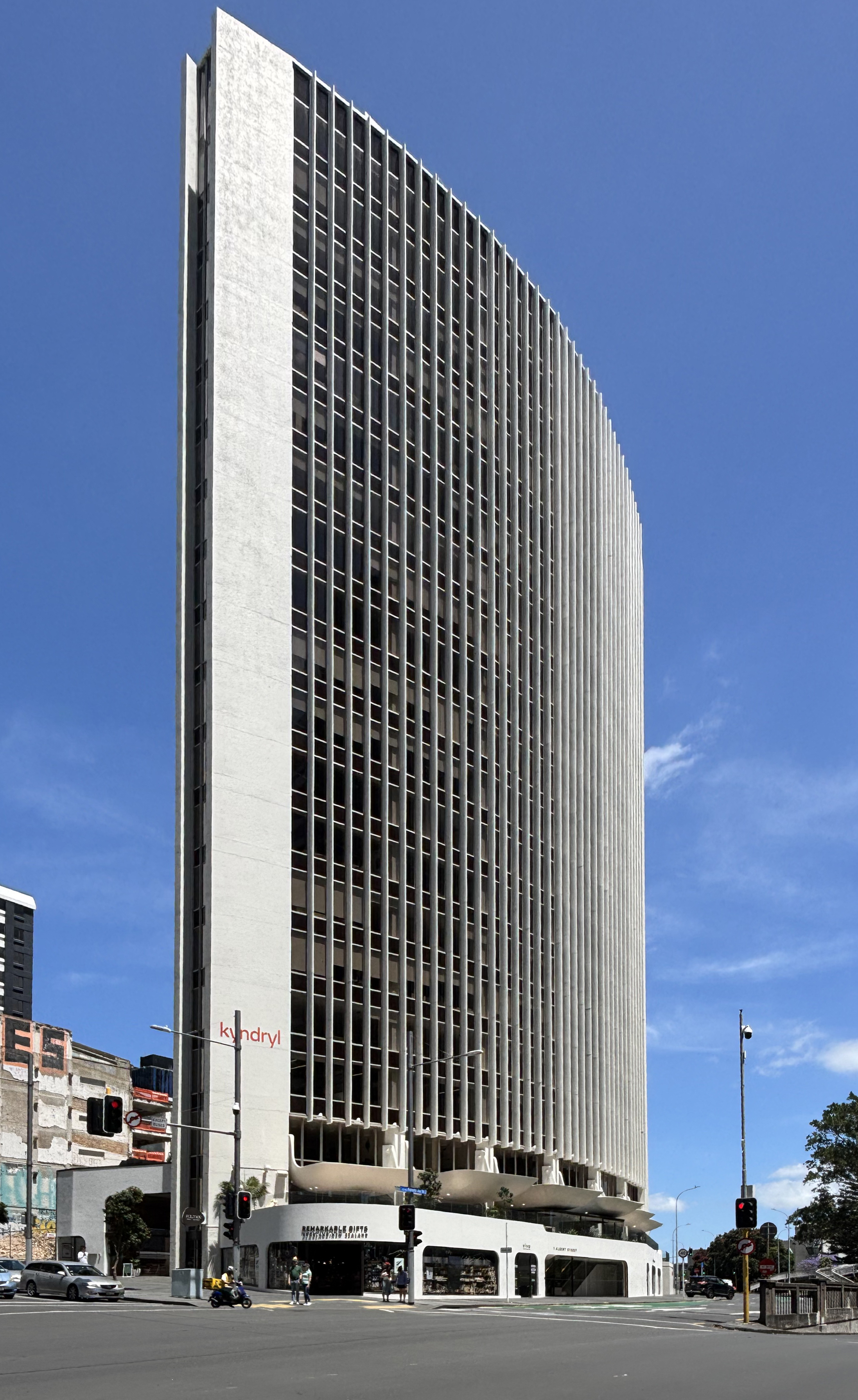
Wingfoil shape seen from corner of Customs and Albert Streets

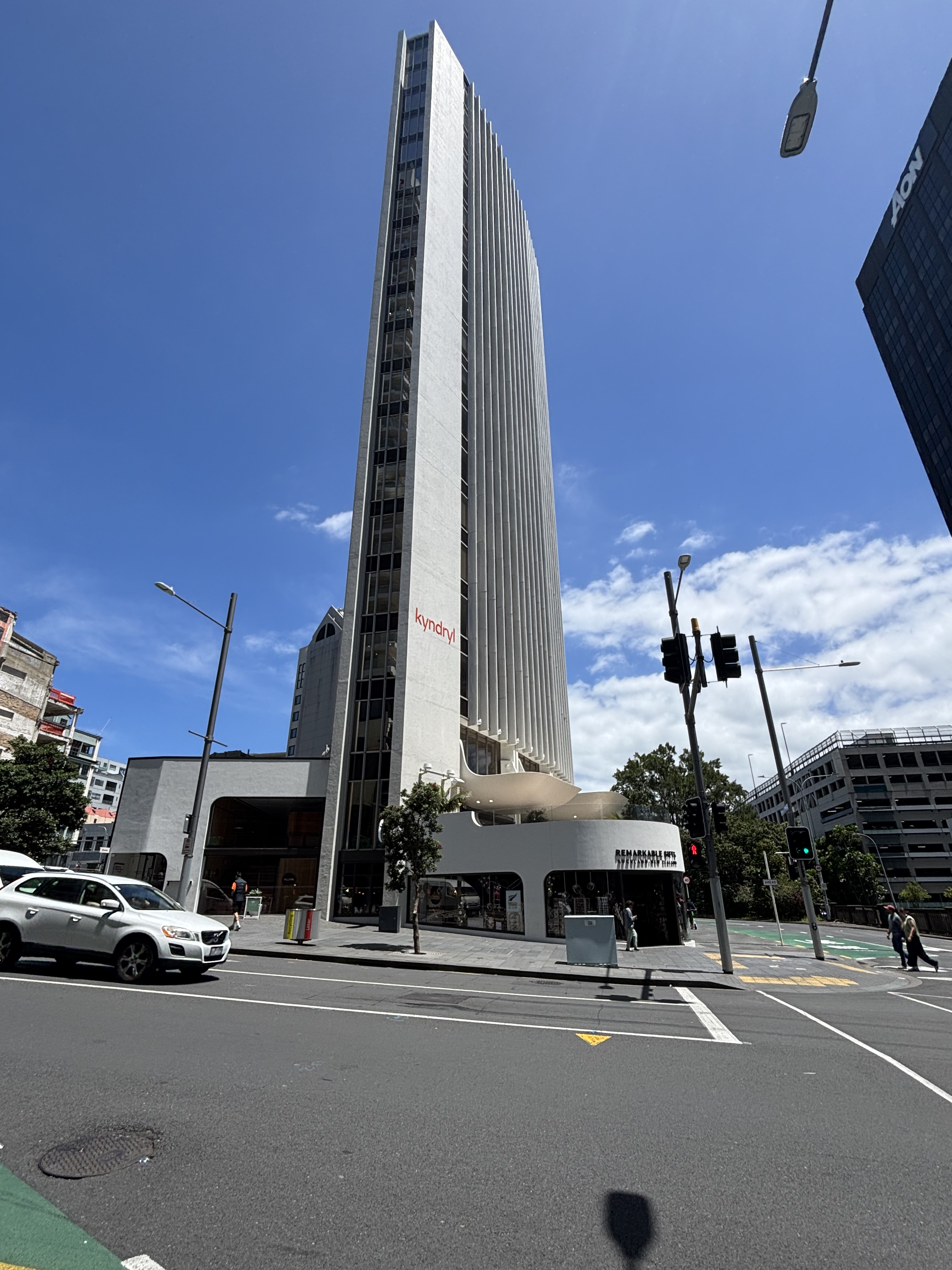
Podiums on view

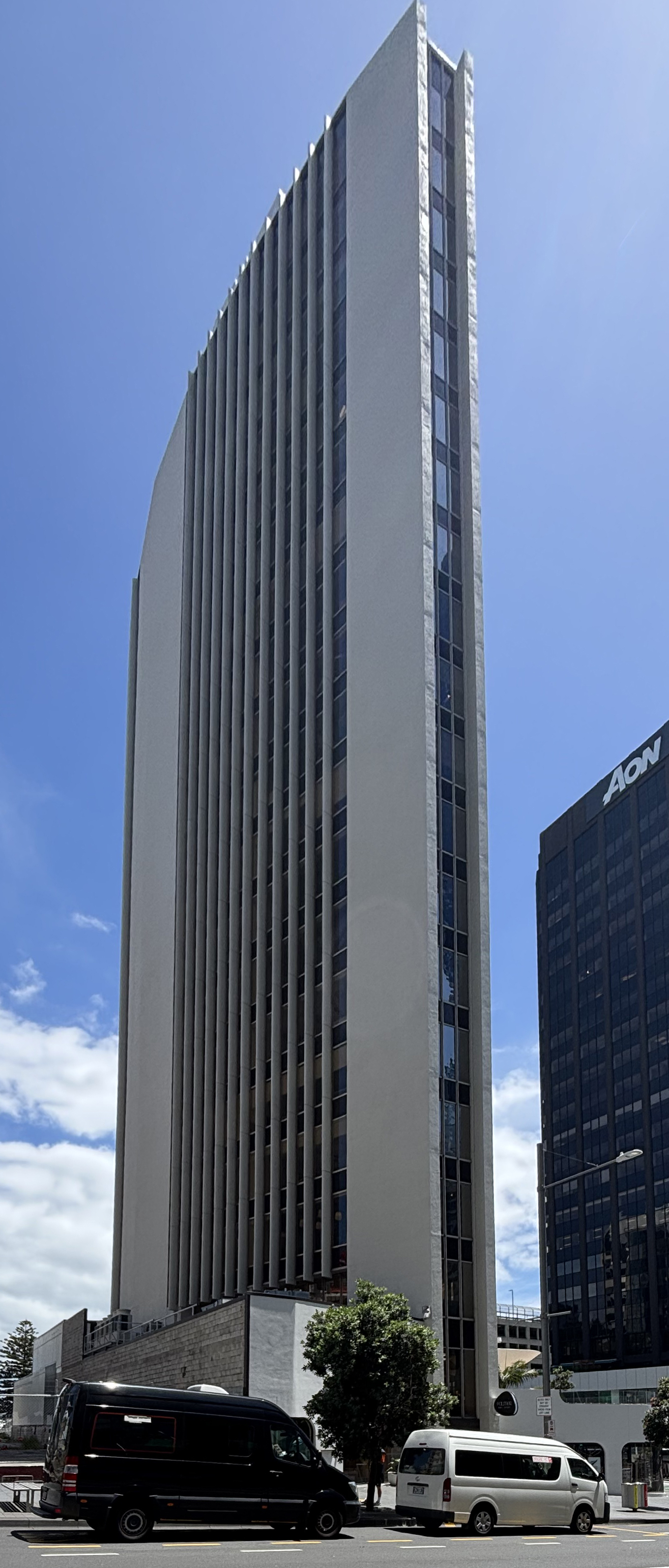
Wingfoil shape seen from a little further up Albert Street

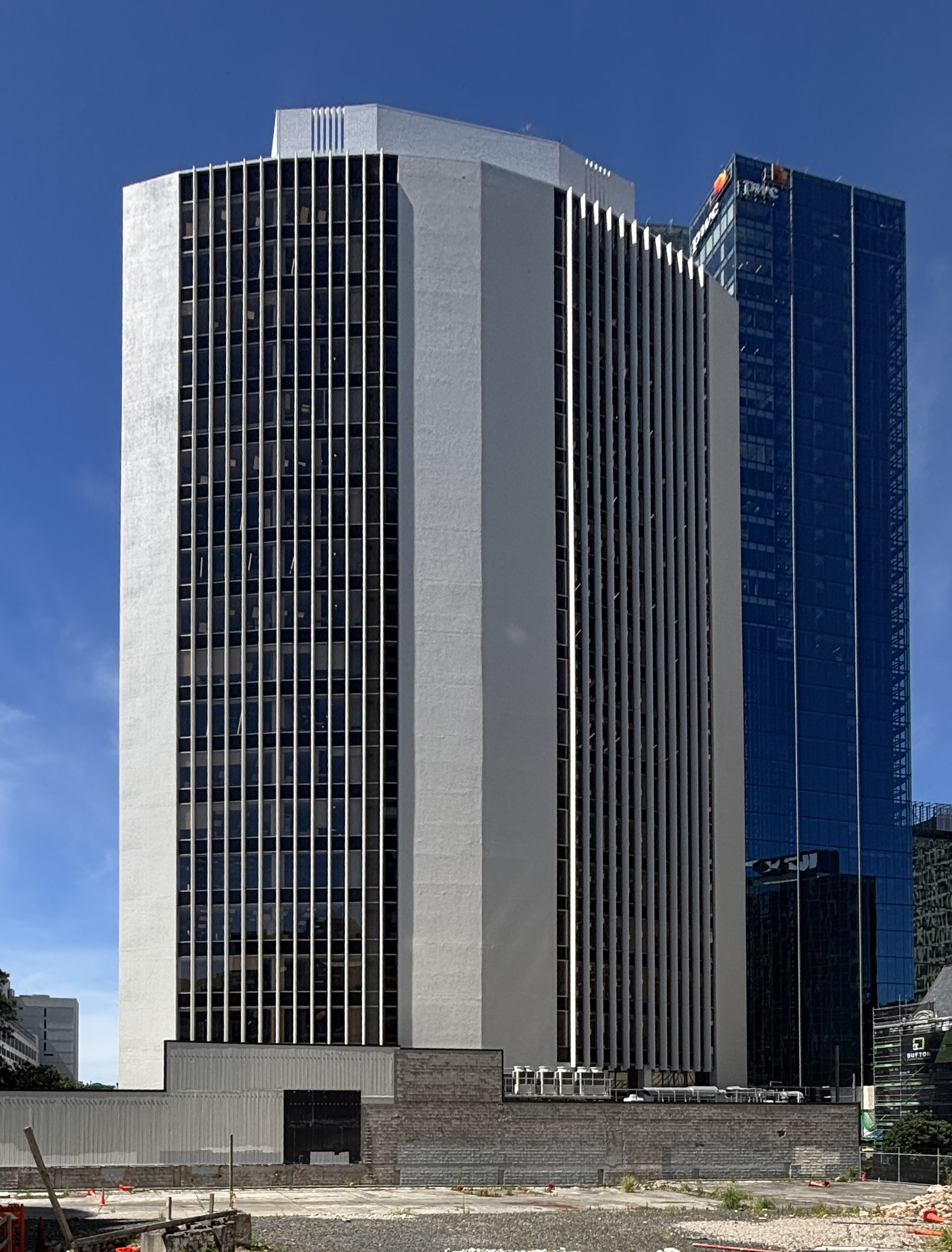
View from Wolfe Street

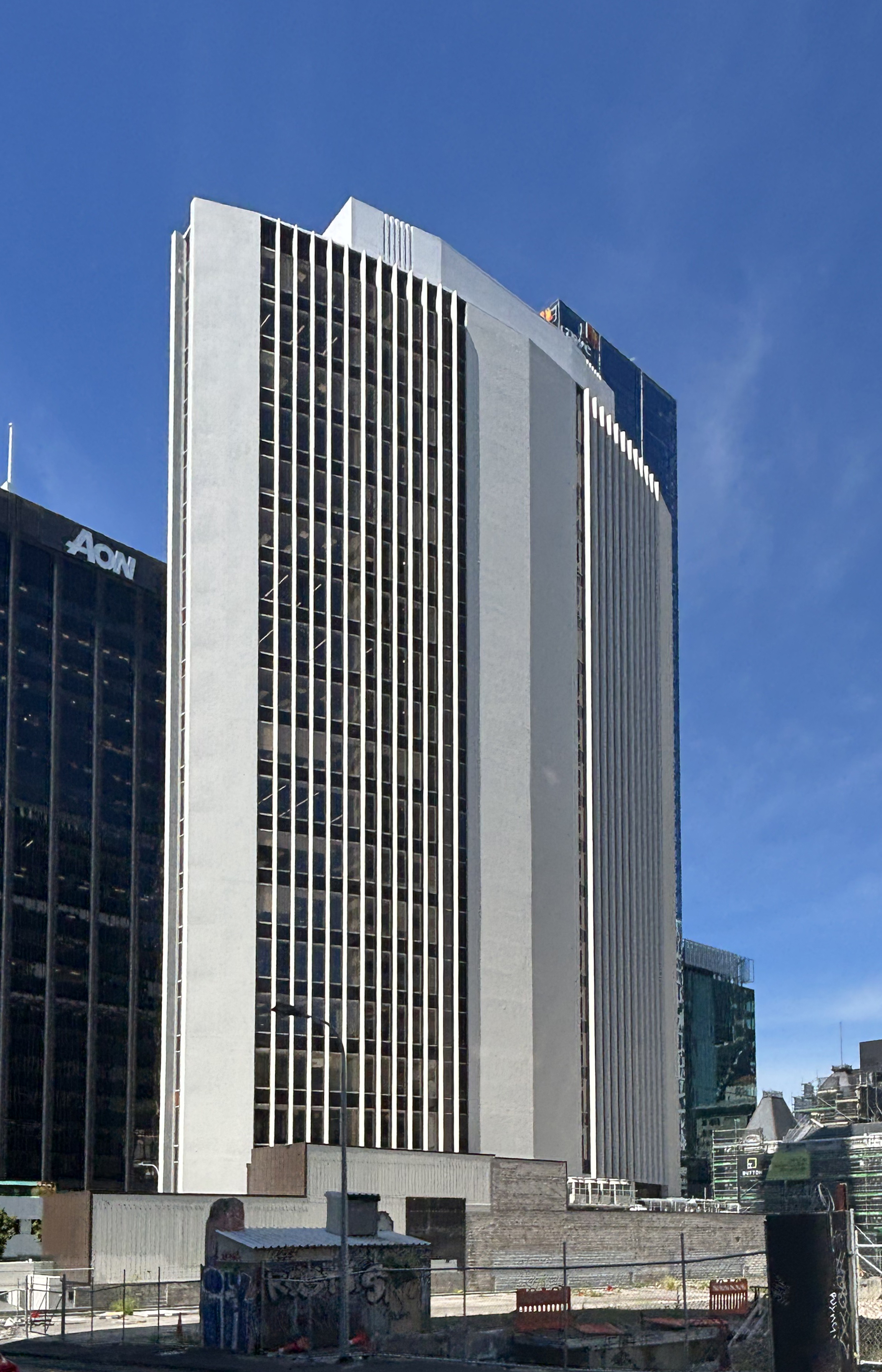
View from corner of Wolfe and Federal Streets

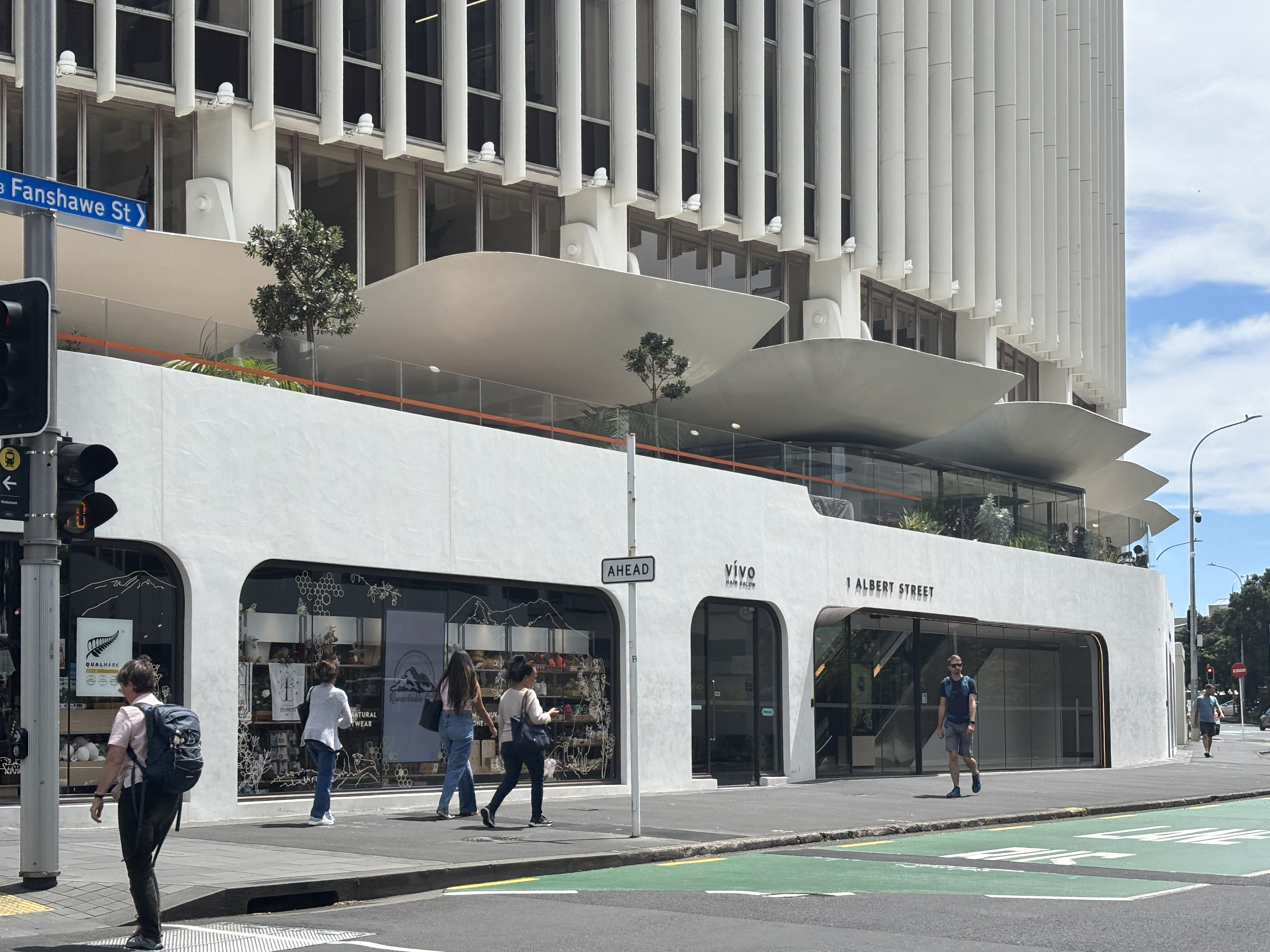
Concrete scoops above the podium
