= The Ascott Metropolis =

40-story residential and hotel skyscraper in Auckland, New Zealand

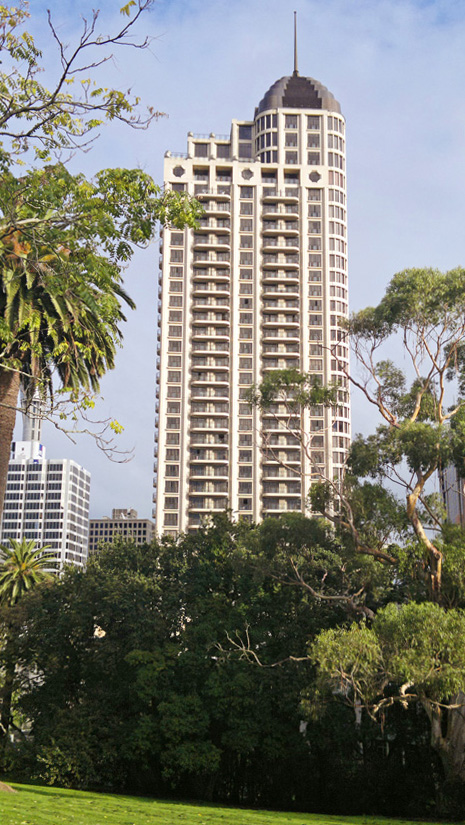
- The Ascott Metropolis seen from Bowen Avenue in October 2009

General information
- Status: Completed
- Type: Mixed-use
- Location: 1 Courthouse Lane, Auckland, New Zealand
- Coordinates: 36°50′53.4″S 174°46′00.2″E
- Construction started: 1997
- Completed: 1999
- Cost: NZ$180 million

Height
- Architectural: 155 m (509 ft)
- Tip: 155 m (509 ft)
- Roof: 138 m (453 ft)

Technical details
- Structural system: Concrete
- Floor count: 40

Design and construction
- Architecture firm: Peddle Thorp
- Developer: Krukziener Properties

Other information
- Number of rooms: 55
- Number of suites: 368

Website
- https://www.metropolis.co.nz/

The Ascott Metropolis is a mixed-use residential and hotel skyscraper in Auckland, New Zealand. Standing at a height of 155 m (509 ft) and encompassing 40 floors, it is currently the sixth-tallest building in New Zealand. Completed in 1999 by Krukziener Properties and commended for its style and quality, the NZ$180 million cost of its construction also led to major financial fallout. The Ascott Metropolis is considered one of Auckland's most exclusive apartment buildings.

The skyscraper was constructed mainly from reinforced concrete between 1997 and 1999. Upon its completion in 1999, it dethroned the nearby ANZ Centre to become the tallest building in New Zealand and the entire region of the Polynesian Triangle, holding the title for one year until it was surpassed by the Vero Centre. Designed by Peddle Thorp, the building contains 368 apartments in addition to 55 hotel rooms.

On December 11, 2013, Alain Robert climbed the skyscraper as part of a promotion for the Samsung Galaxy Gear smartwatch.

== Gallery ==
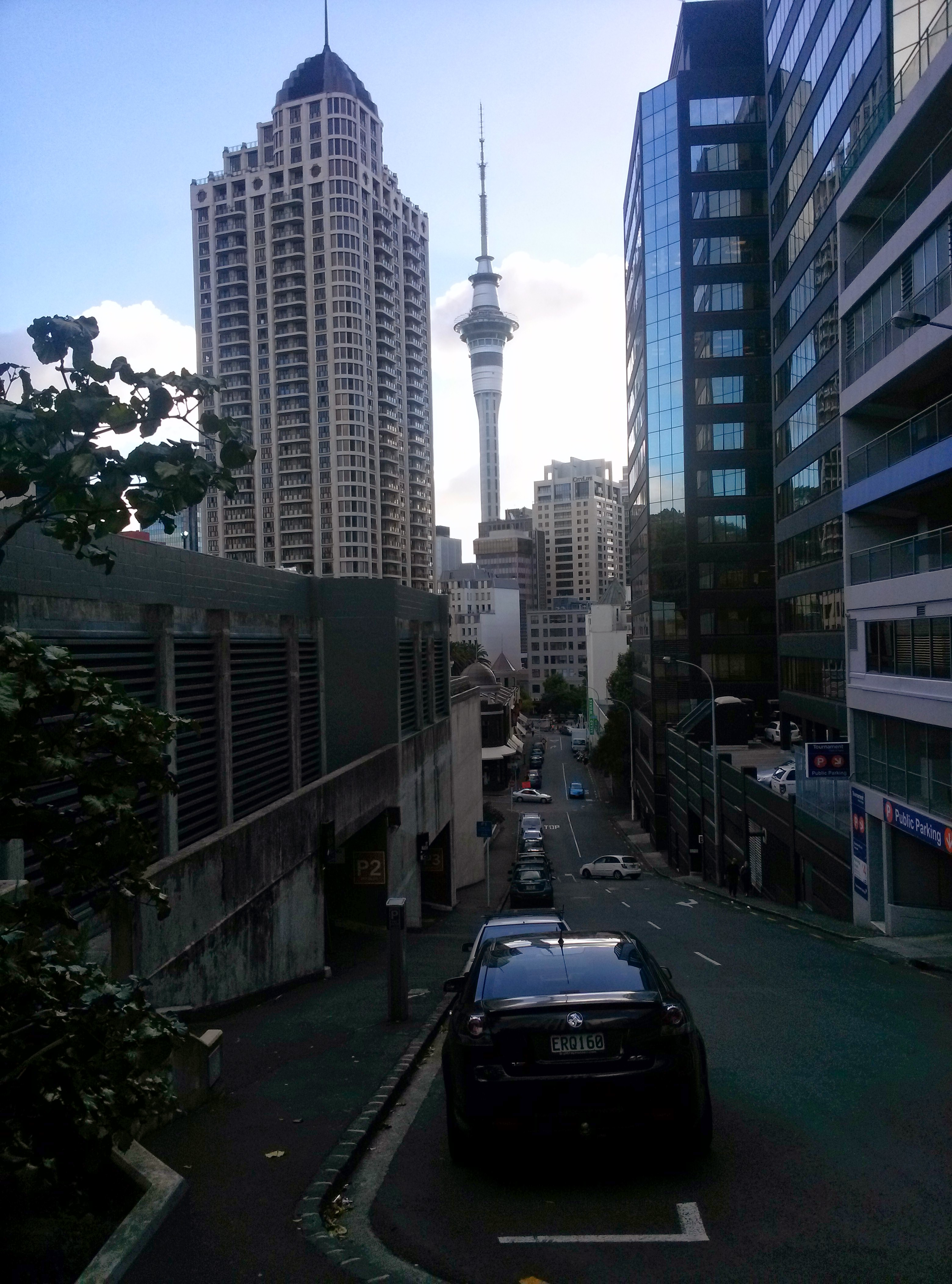
The skyline of Auckland CBD viewed from an elevated street, showing The Ascott Metropolis on the left and the Sky Tower in the center distance

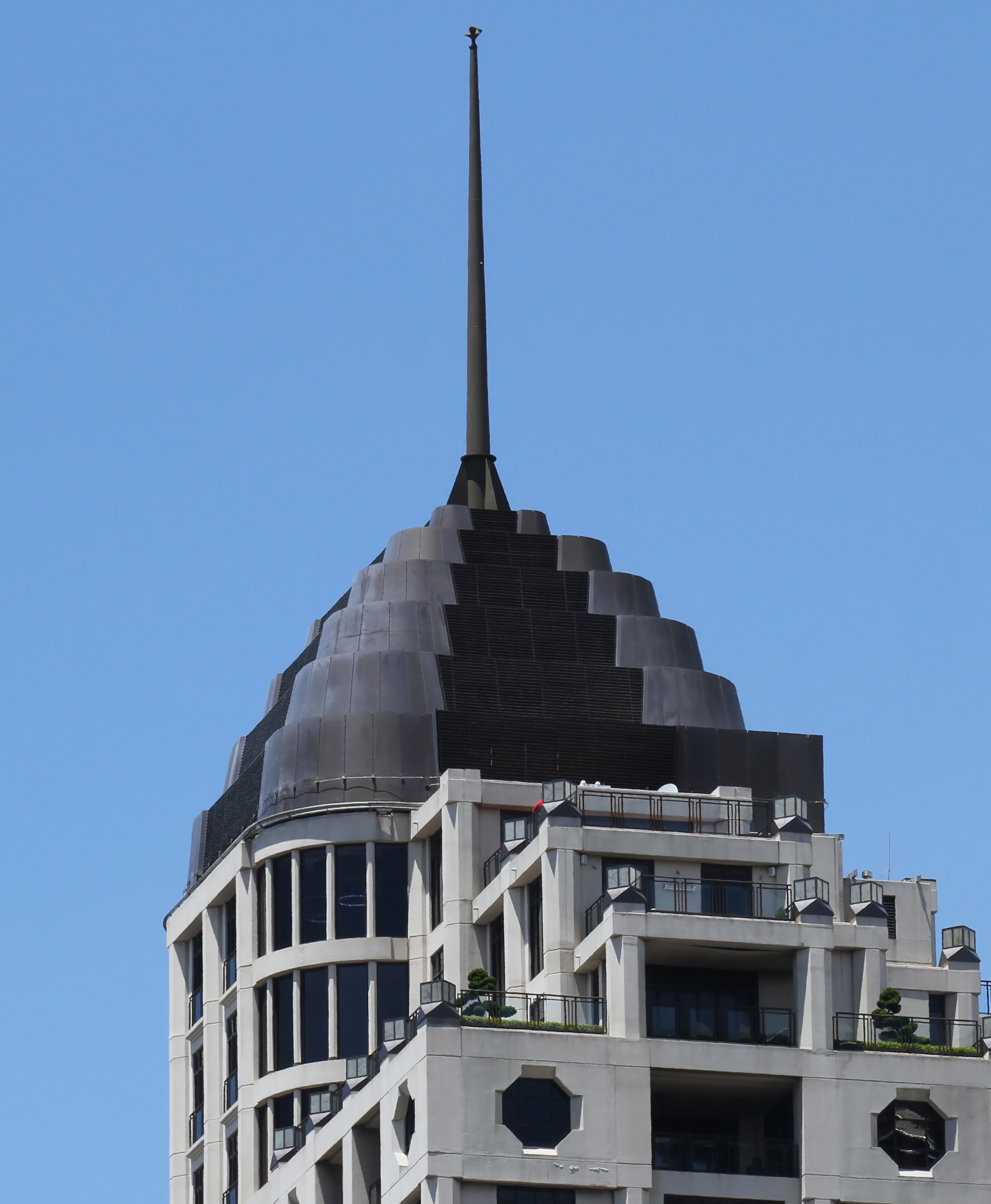
The spire and upper roof structure of The Ascott Metropolis

== See also ==
- List of tallest structures in New Zealand
- List of tallest buildings in Auckland
