= Sentinel (building) =

Luxury residential skyscraper in Takapuna, Auckland, New Zealand

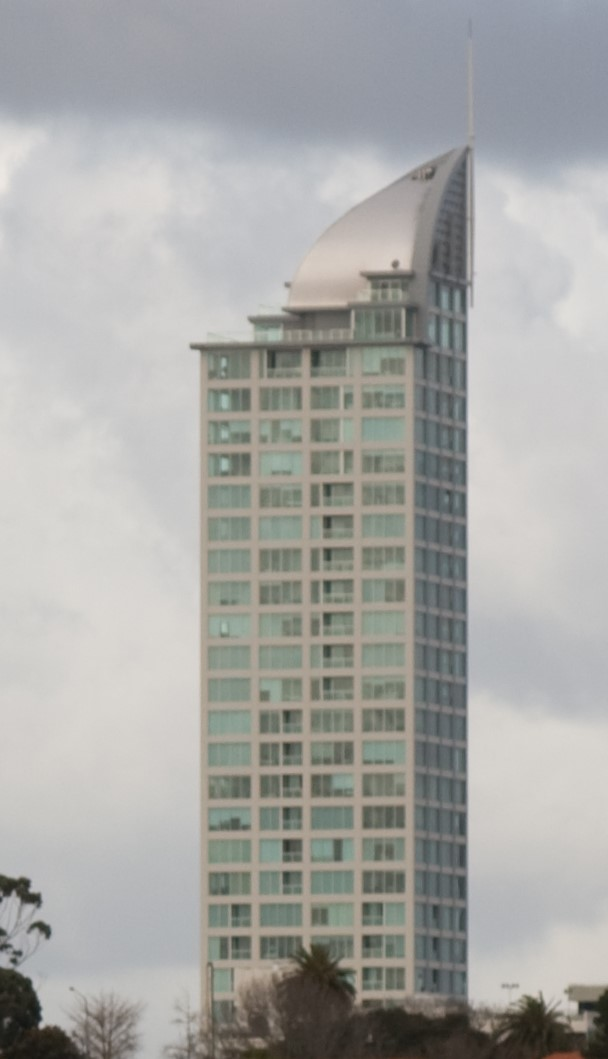
The skyscraper in July 2009

The Sentinel is a luxury residential skyscraper in Takapuna, the central business district of the North Shore region of Auckland, New Zealand. Standing at an architectural height of 150 m (492 ft), it is currently the tallest building in Auckland outside of the Auckland CBD, as well as the 8th-tallest building in New Zealand overall. The building features 30 floors and a roof height of 120 m (394 ft). Construction began in 2005, and the building opened to residents in February 2008.

The building contains 117 apartments.

The building features various design motifs, ranging from the square, which is used extensively in the glass facade proportions and smaller details, to the woven flax basket, which is suggested in the latticework of the exterior.

The Sentinel was built by Multiplex Constructions for NZ$60 million and was given a non-notified consent by North Shore City Council because the idea of having a landmark building in Takapuna was considered favourably when the developer Cornerstone Group first proposed it in 2003. The developer has also stated that the consenting regulations have since become onerous to a degree that he would not build such a building under current rules.

== See also ==
- List of tallest buildings in Auckland
- List of tallest structures in New Zealand
