= USS George F. Elliott =

Two ships of the United States Navy have been named USS George F. Elliott in honor of George F. Elliott.

- USS George F. Elliott (AP-13), ordered as War Haven for British service was requisitioned during construction, launched then commissioned as USS Victorious (ID-3514) in 1918. Commercial vessel between wars as Victorious, City of Havre (1931) and City of Los Angeles (1938). Acquired by the Navy on 30 October 1940, renamed George F. Elliott and recommissioned on 10 January 1941. Sunk by USS Hull (DD-350) after sustaining heavy damage on 8 August 1942.
- USS George F. Elliott (AP-105), launched as Delbrasil for Delta Lines 16 December 1939, acquired by the War Shipping Administration (WSA) on 28 April 1942 for Navy operation, commissioned 23 September 1943 and sold to the Farrell Lines of New York in 1948 to be renamed African Endeavor.

== See also ==
- USS Elliot
