= MLC Building, Auckland =

Heritage listed building in central Auckland, New Zealand

MLC Building
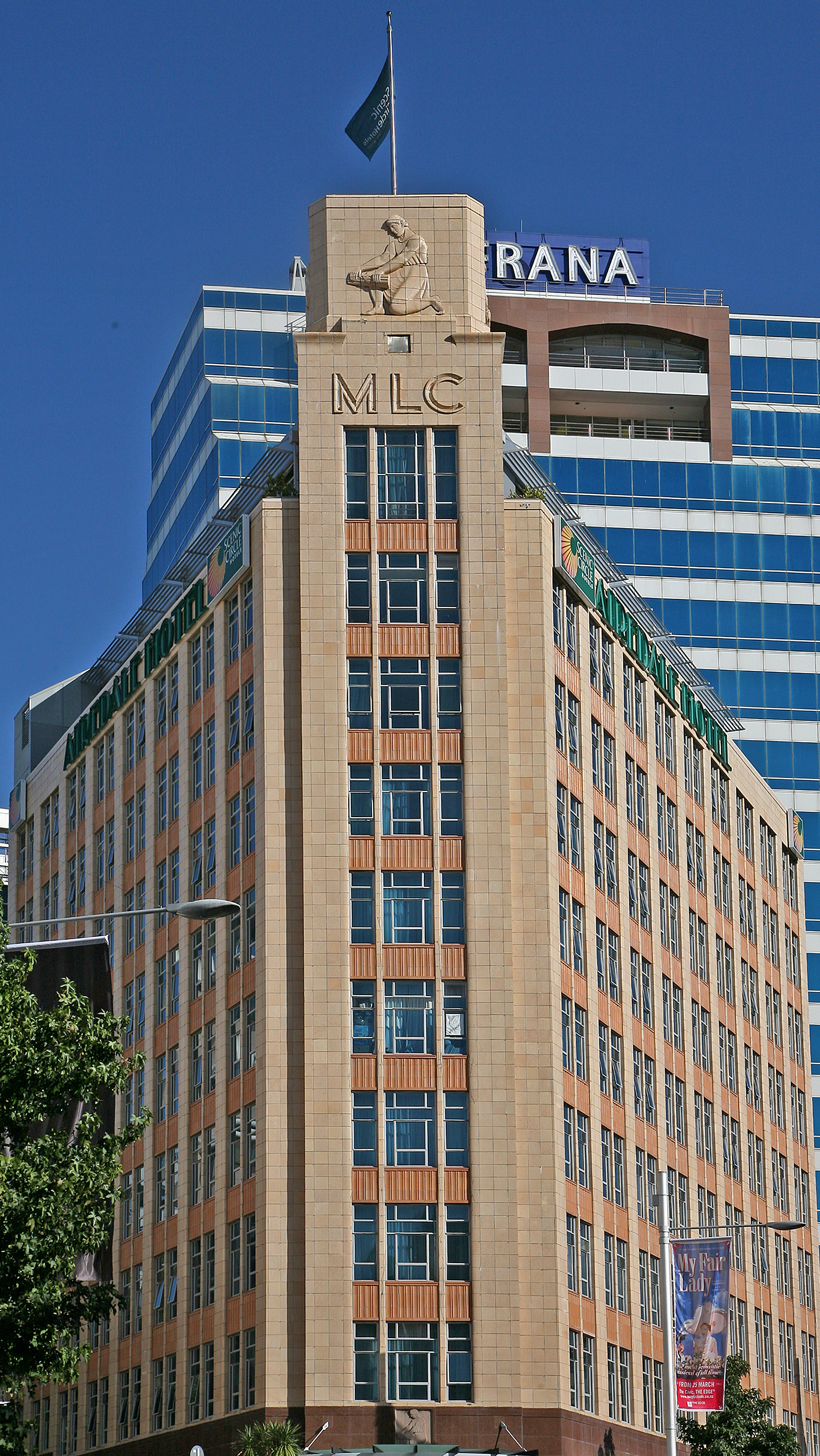
- Interactive map of the MLC Building area

General information
- Architectural style: Art Deco
- Location: 380 Queen Street, Auckland, New Zealand
- Coordinates: 36°51′12″S 174°45′49″E
- Completed: 1956

Technical details
- Floor count: 9

Design and construction
- Architects: Mitchell & Mitchell
- Main contractor: Fletcher Construction

Heritage New Zealand – Category 2
- Official name: MLC Building
- Designated: 26 November 1981
- Reference no.: 618

The MLC Building, also known as the Mutual Life & Citizens Assurance Company Building, is a heritage-listed building in Auckland, New Zealand. Located at 380 Queen Street, on the corner of Queen and Airedale Streets, opposite the Auckland Town Hall, the Art Deco building was completed in 1956, at which time it was the tallest building in Auckland.

== Design and construction ==
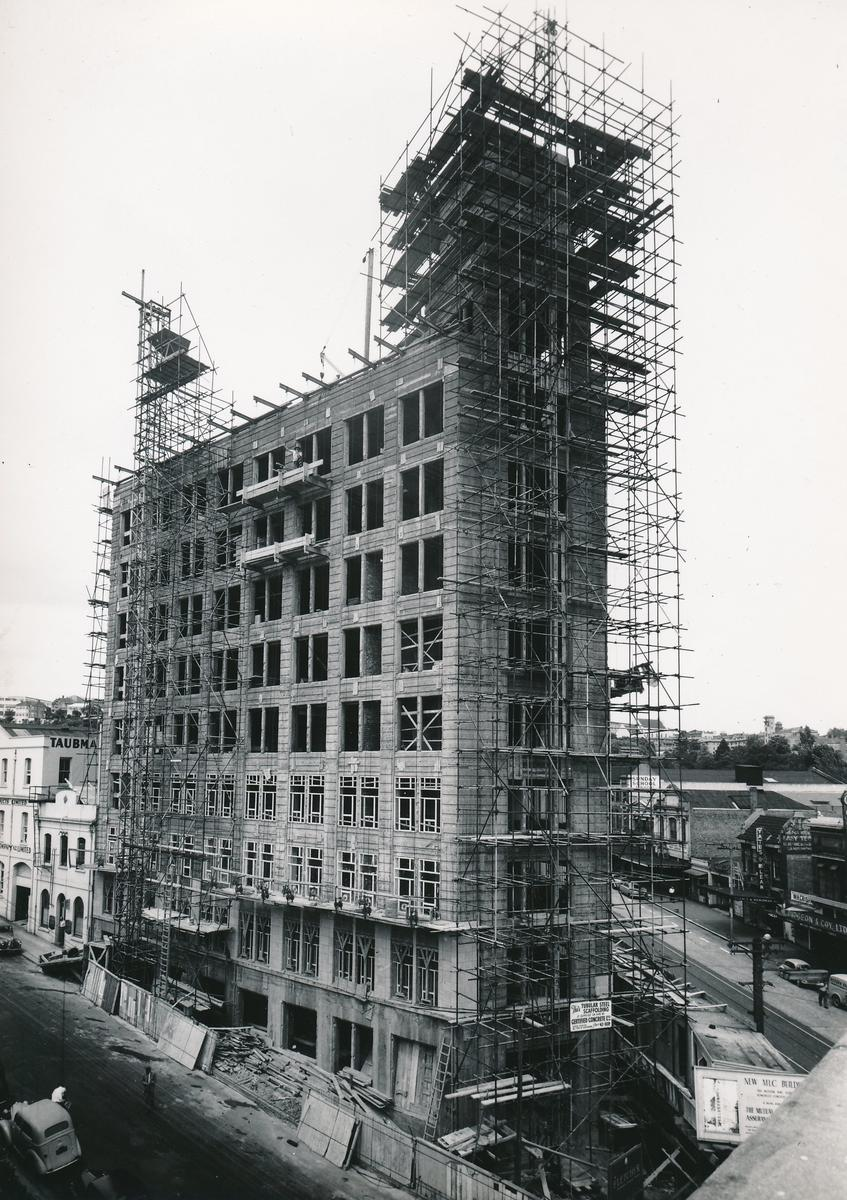
MLC Building under construction, 1956

The building was designed by Mitchell & Mitchell architects and constructed by Fletcher Construction. Work on the building started in May 1954, and it was opened in December 1956 by then mayor of Auckland, Thomas Ashby. At the time of construction, it was the tallest building in Auckland.

The ground floor frontage was faced with Balmoral granite veneer supplied by the New Zealand Marble Company, and sculpted granite and terracotta panels appeared over street entrances and on the tower of the building. Lift halls and main corridors were panelled with Queensland maple veneer, with a marble entrance lobby.

== Later use ==
In 1999, the building was converted into a hotel and apartment complex and has since been managed by Scenic Hotel Group as the Legacy Airedale Hotel.

== Heritage listing ==
The building is listed as a Category 2 Historic Place (places considered to have historical or cultural significance or value) by Heritage New Zealand. It is very similar in design to the Mutual Life & Citizens Assurance Company Building in Wellington, completed in 1940. A smaller version of the MLC building, also designed by Mitchell & Mitchell and constructed by Fletcher Construction, was built at 14 Garden Place, Hamilton, in 1957.

== Gallery ==
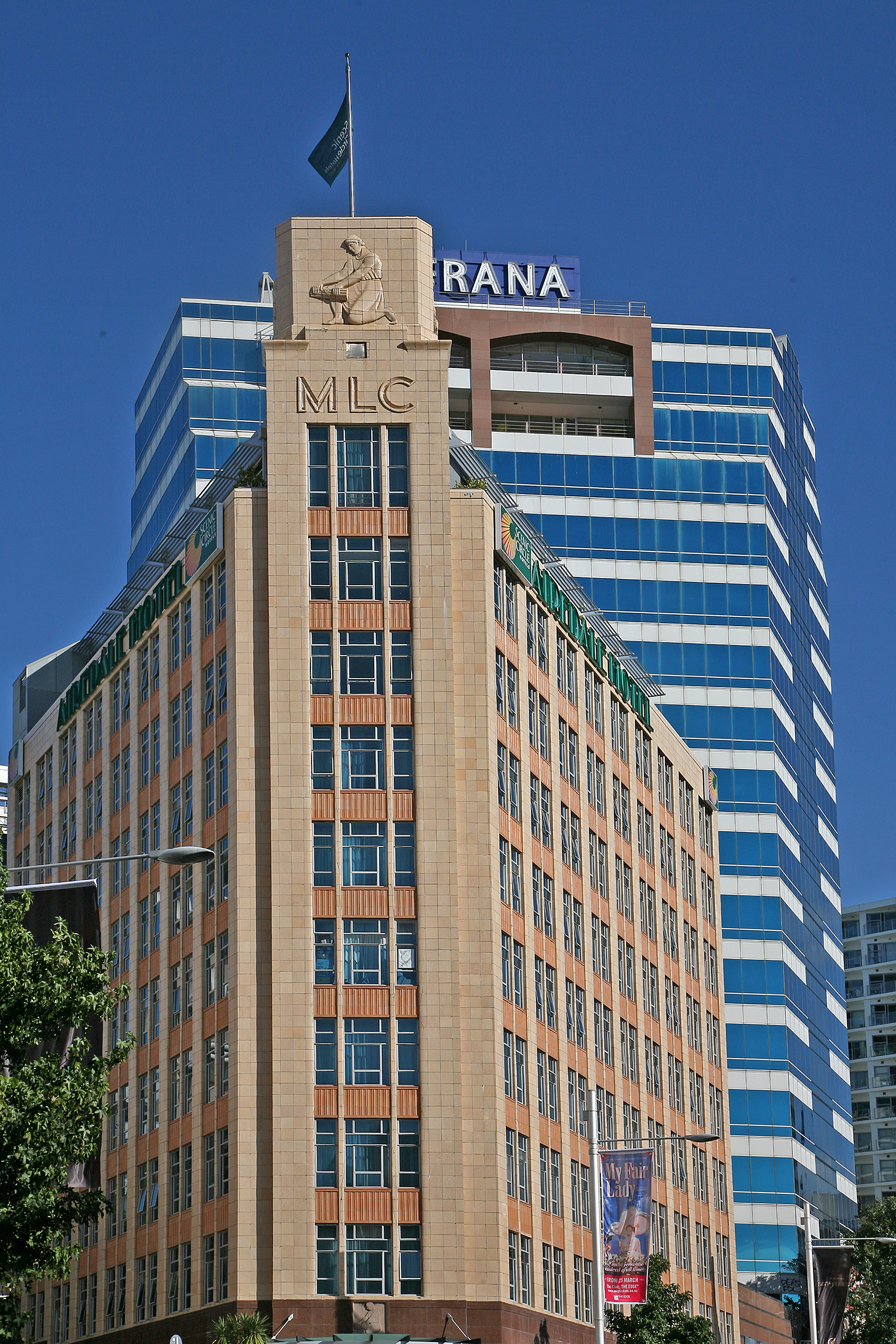

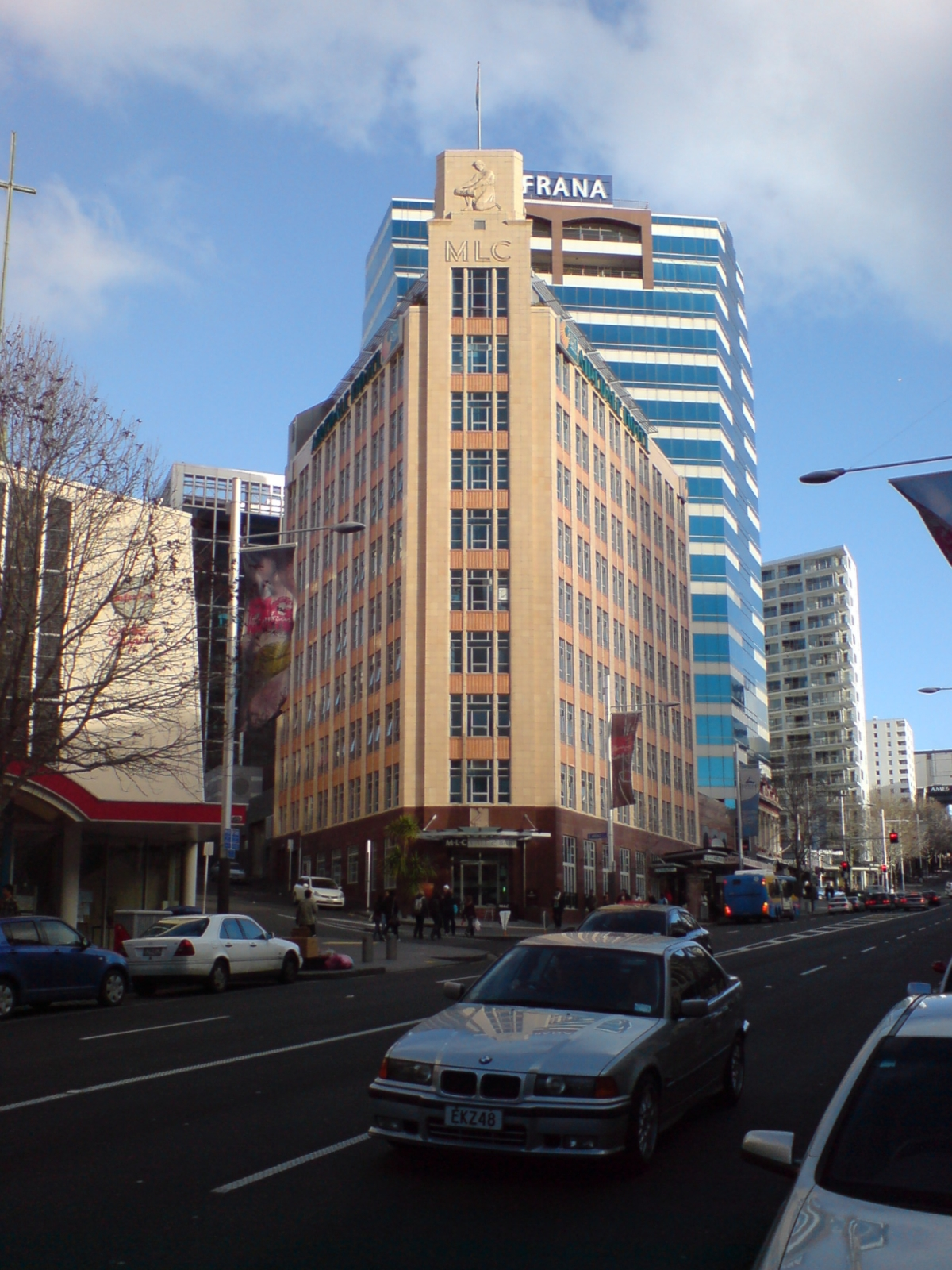

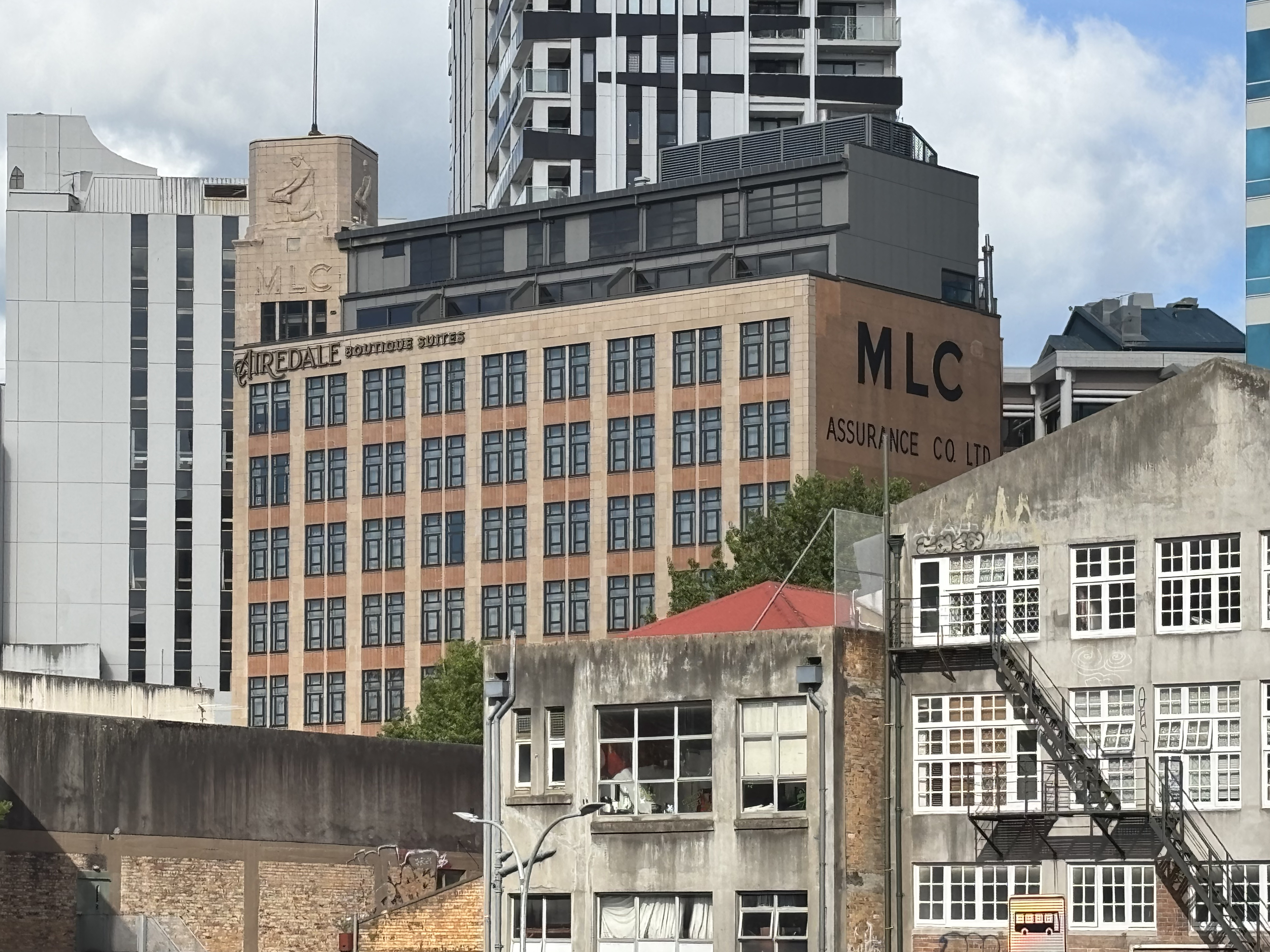

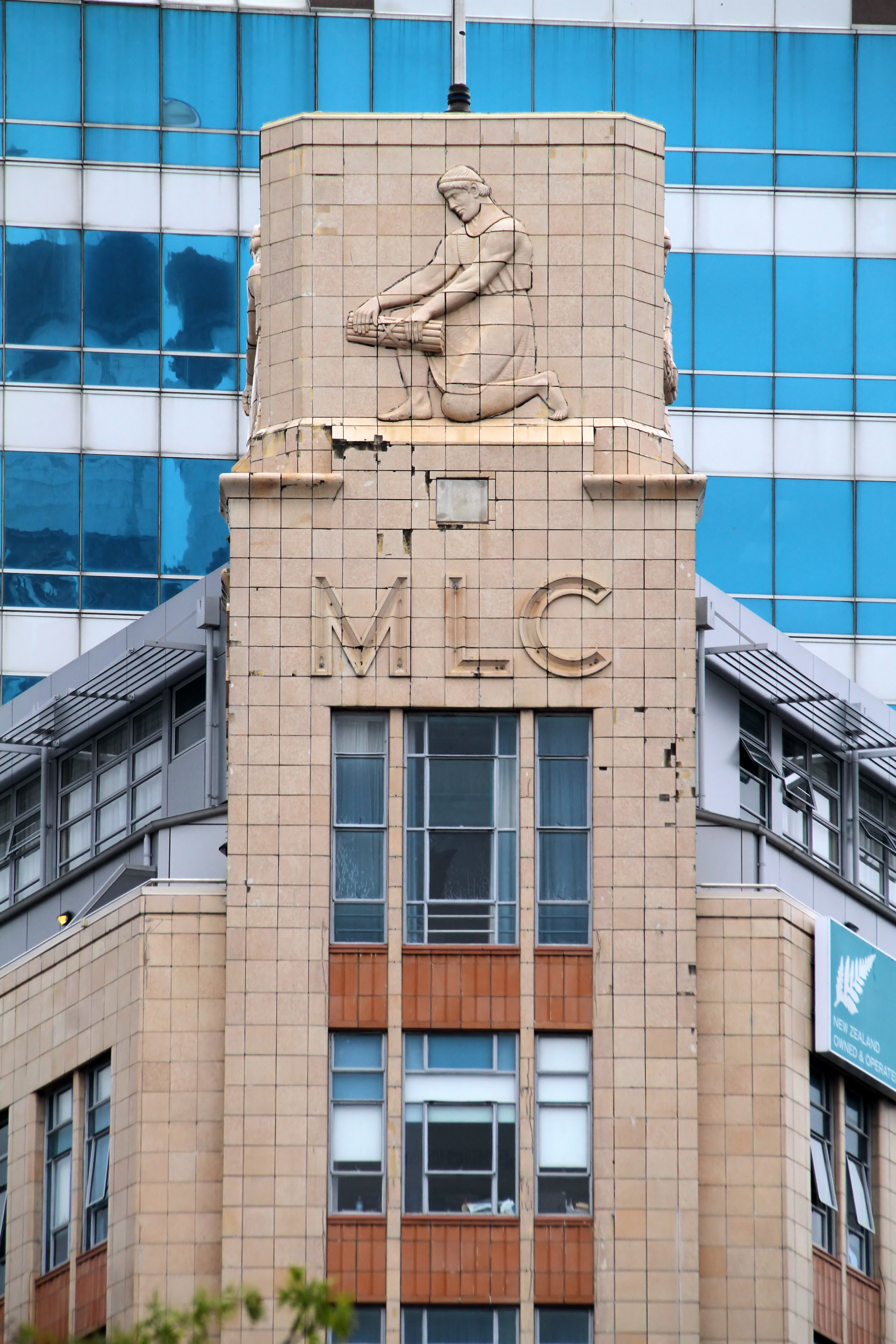

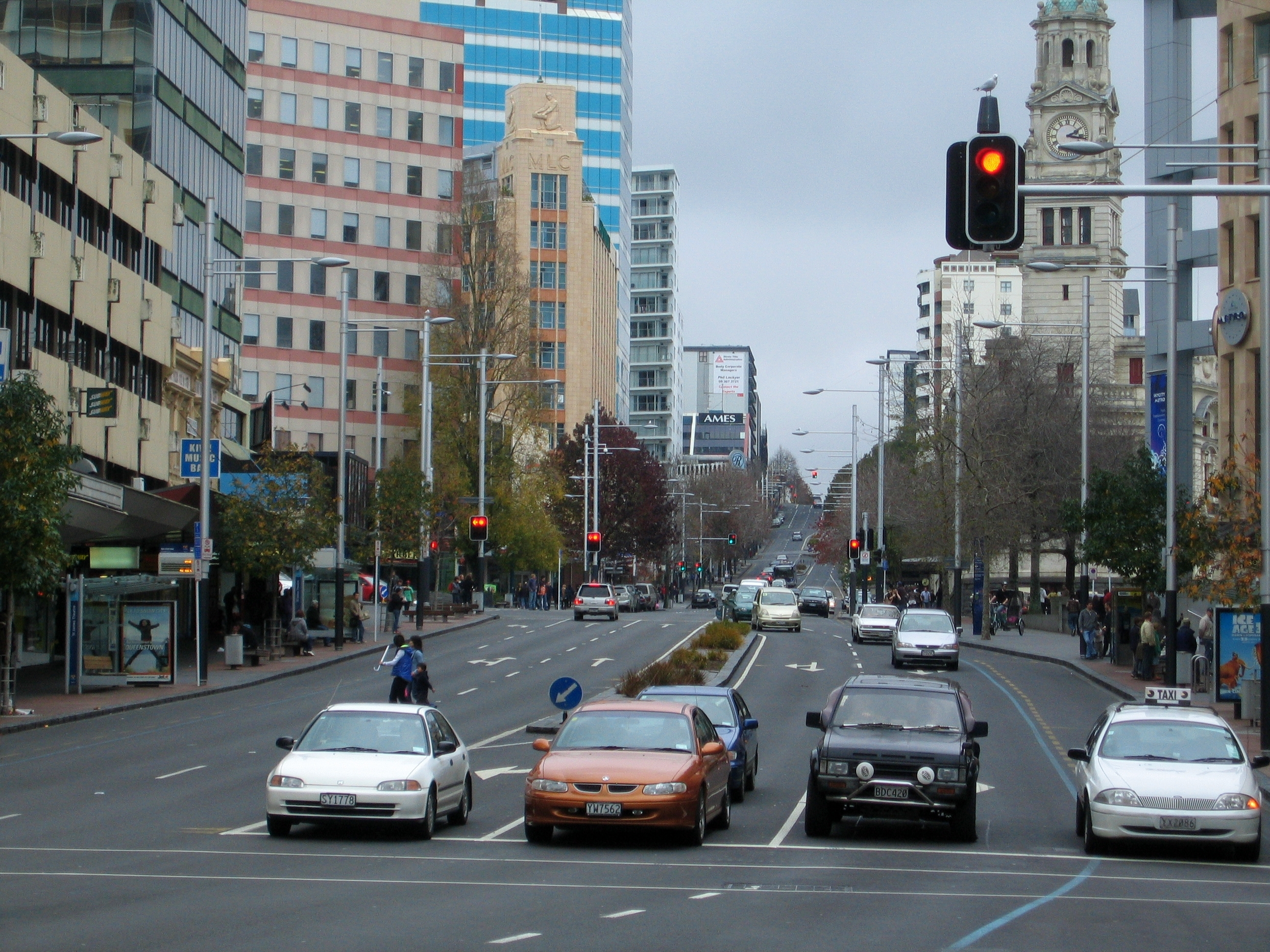

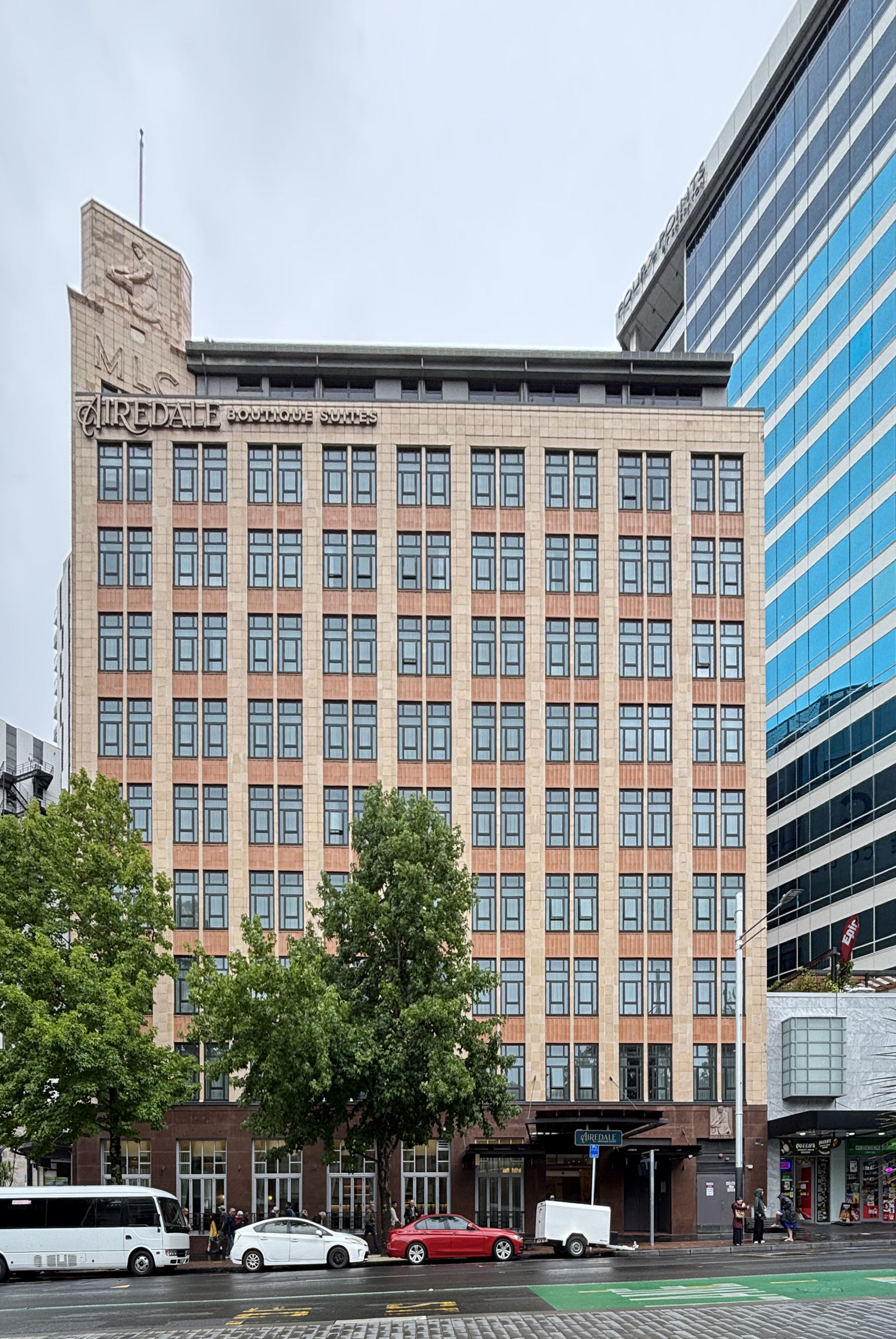
