= Seascape (Auckland) =

Unfinished residential skyscraper in Auckland, New Zealand

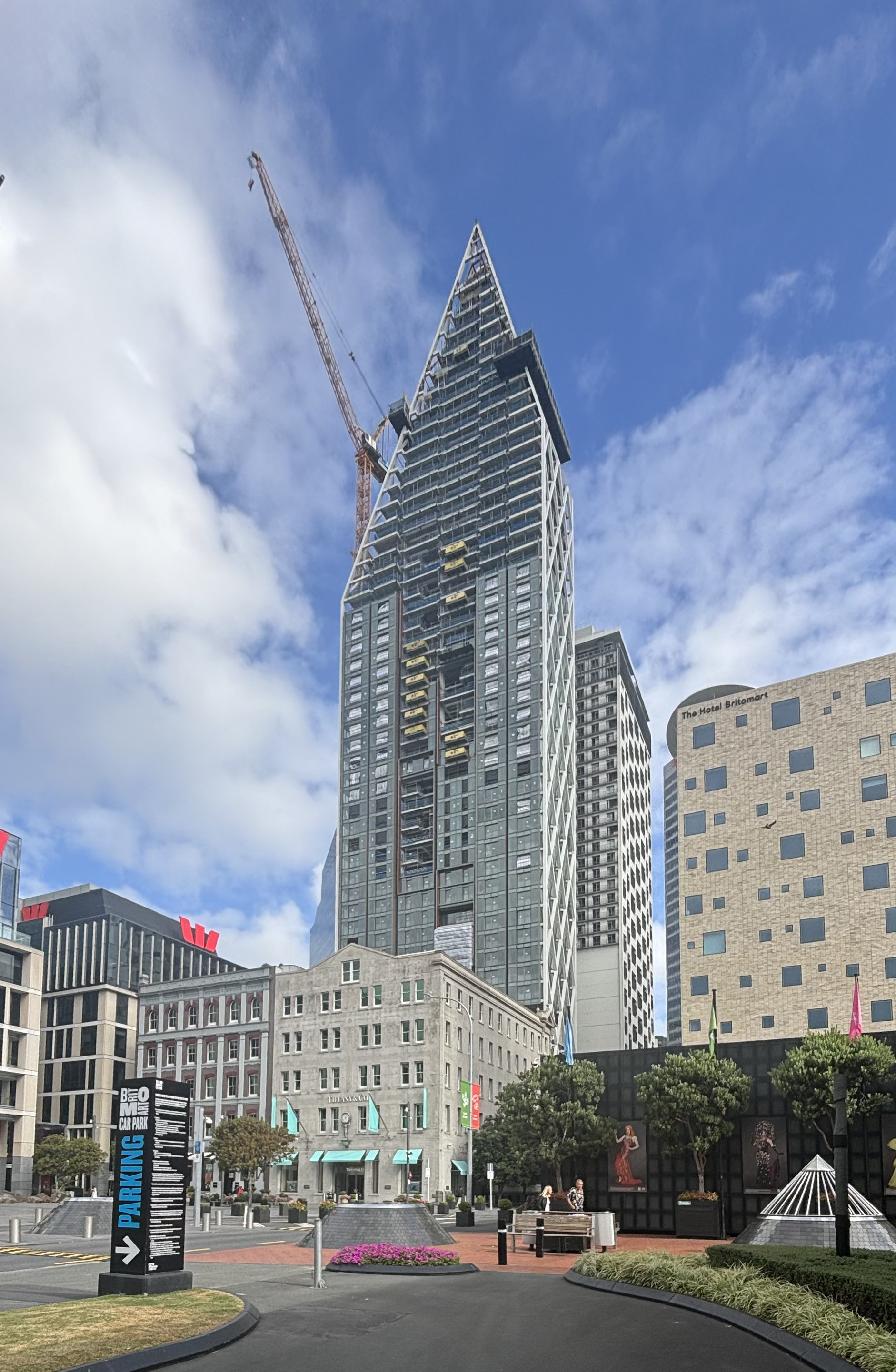
- Seascape in March 2026
- Interactive map of the Seascape area

General information
- Status: On hold
- Type: Residential
- Location: 85 Customs Street East, Auckland, New Zealand
- Coordinates: 36°50′43.8″S 174°46′08.1″E
- Construction started: 2017
- Completed: Unknown
- Cost: NZ$300 million

Height
- Architectural: 187.2 m (614 ft)

Technical details
- Floor count: 56 (+ 5 below ground)

Design and construction
- Architect: Peddle Thorp
- Developer: Shundi Customs
- Main contractor: China State Construction Overseas Development Co., Ltd.

Website
- https://peddlethorp.co.nz/projects/seascape-apartments-building/

Seascape is an unfinished 56-story residential skyscraper in Auckland, New Zealand. Standing at a height of 187.2 m (614 ft), it is currently the tallest building in New Zealand, as well as the tallest building in Oceania outside of Australia. Construction began in 2017, and the building fully topped out in April 2024, but work was indefinitely suspended in August 2024. The project entered receivership in 2026 and was subsequently placed on the market. As of 2026, the building remains incomplete.

== Construction ==
Construction on the skyscraper began in 2017 and was originally expected to be completed in 2021. However, disruptions associated with the COVID-19 pandemic resulted in significant delays.

As of November 2022, half of the 221 apartments had been sold.

In August 2024, main contractor China State Construction Overseas Development Co., Ltd. wrote to 25 subcontractors to notify them that work on Seascape had been suspended and that their services were no longer required. By this stage, the building had already been structurally topped out, leaving the interiors and facade incomplete. The contractor claimed that the halting of site works was the result of a payment default by the project developer, the Shanghai-based Shundi Group. It is currently uncertain when or whether construction will resume.

In April 2026, the building was placed on the market by receivers Calibre Partners after developer Shundi Customs entered receivership the previous month. Bayleys Real Estate and Knight Frank were appointed to conduct an international sales campaign for the partially completed tower.

In September 2026, it was announced that a buyer had been chosen for the building, with expectations that work on the building would resume in 2027.

== Gallery ==
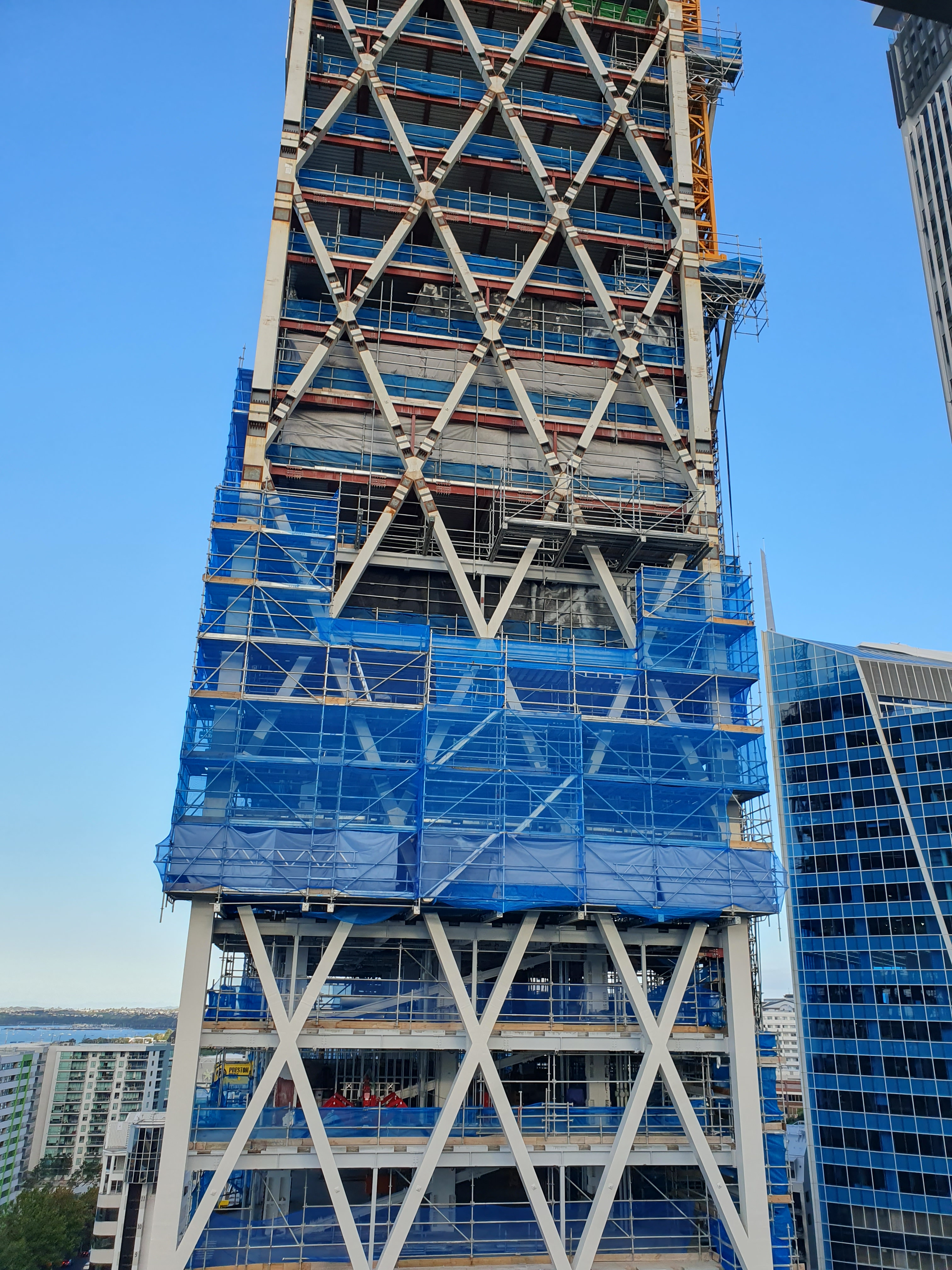
Seascape in March 2023

== See also ==
- List of tallest buildings in Oceania
- List of tallest buildings in Auckland
- List of tallest structures in New Zealand
