= Elliott, West Virginia =

Human settlement in Fayette County, West Virginia, United States of America

Coordinates: 38.1792761°N 80.9892667°W

Elliott is an extinct town in Fayette County, in the U.S. state of West Virginia.

Fayette County

== History ==
The community had the name of one Mr. Elliott, the proprietor of a local mill.
