= USS Elliot =

USS Elliot refers to two ships of United States Navy:

- USS Elliot (DD-146), a Wickes-class destroyer
- USS Elliot (DD-967), a Spruance-class destroyer

== See also ==
- USS George F. Elliott
