= NDG Auckland Centre =

Proposed skyscraper in Auckland, New Zealand

A concept render by G2 Studio for "NDG Ritz Carlton"

The NDG Auckland Centre is a proposed tower block consisting of a Ritz-Carlton hotel skyscraper in Auckland, New Zealand. If the tower is built, it would become the second-tallest freestanding structure in New Zealand at 209 metres (686 ft) (after the Sky Tower), and the tallest building.

The project was first announced by the Dae Ju Group as the 'Elliott Tower', with planning permission granted in 2007, but general economic trends halted further progress as of April 2009, and in mid-2012 the site was sold to Chinese hotel developer, Furu Ding. Furu Ding announced in early 2014 that the development would proceed as the NDG Auckland Centre. As of 2024, the site remains a car park, and the resource consent has been extended to October 2029.

== Project history ==
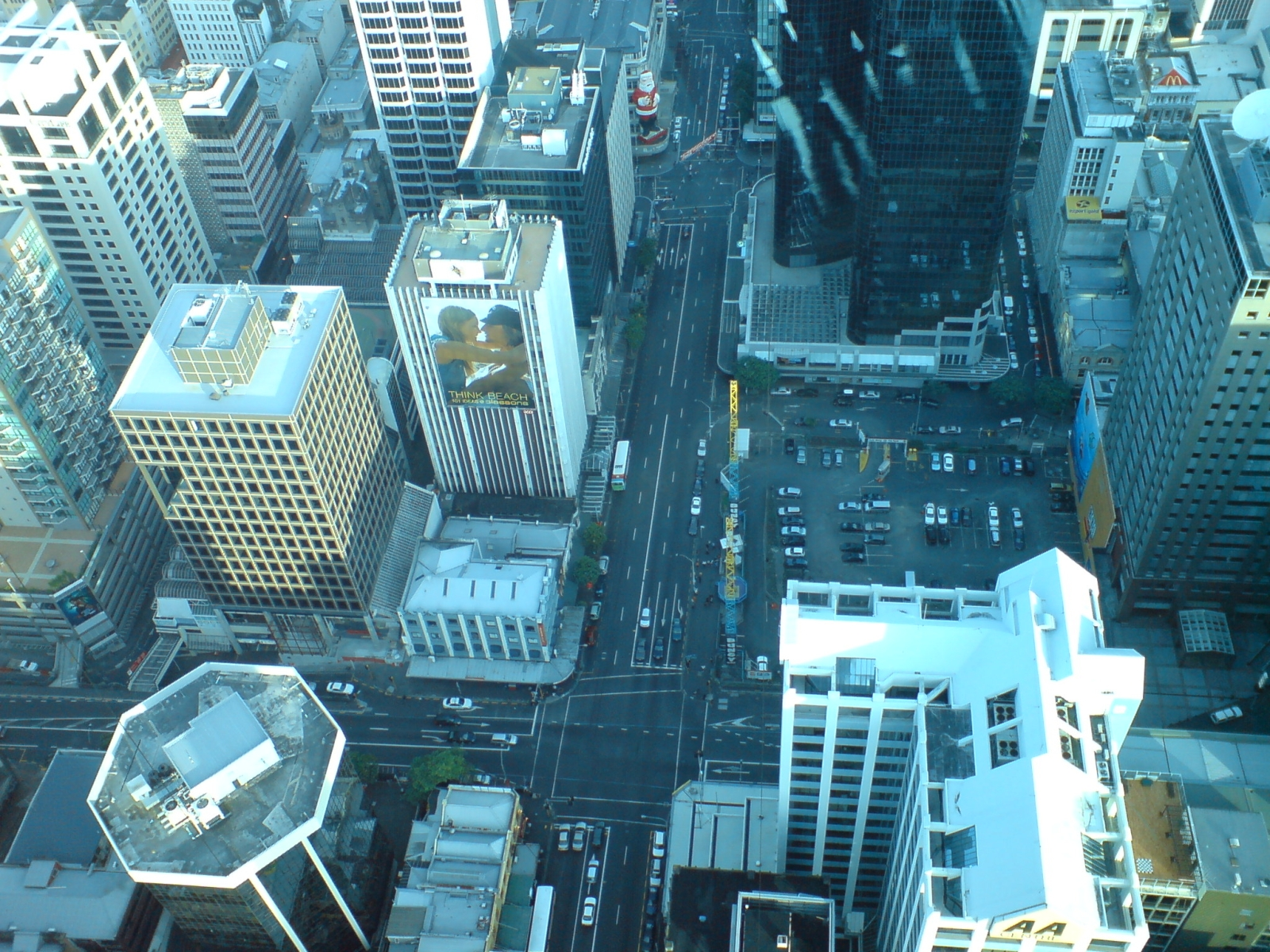
The proposed site of the Elliott Tower (upper right hand) seen from the Sky Tower .

The site on Albert St was originally occupied by the Royal International Hotel before it was bulldozed by Chase Corporation in 1987 for a high-rise development that never proceeded. After a succession of owners, the Korean-based Dae Ju Group purchased the site in 2003.

Elliott Tower was granted planning permission in October 2007 (with the subsequent building consents still outstanding), and would be located on the block bounded by Elliott, Victoria and Albert Streets, on an empty lot which is currently being occupied by a car park and a reverse bungy ride. The tower was originally proposed at 232 m (761 ft). However, a late 2007 Environment Court appeal had to be successfully resolved before the building could go forward. SkyCity Auckland, owners of the nearby Sky Tower, alleged that the building would interfere with the use of communications equipment installed on the tower, and lead to future conflicts over privacy within the new apartments which could conceivably be seen into from the tower. Law firm Philips Fox DLA also joined the appeal, claiming the tower went against planning policies. By the end of June 2008, these appeals were dropped after an out-of-court settlement, clearing the way for the Elliott Tower to proceed. Construction was originally scheduled to start in 2009, with an estimated completion date of 2013.

The project was dormant due to the 2008 financial crisis. In December 2013, the chairman of the Auckland Business Forum Michael Barnett suggested that the construction of the tower would begin in the next two years, along with the construction of the SkyCity convention centre. However, due to complications of the City Rail Link being constructed beneath the site of the NDG tower block, the construction was postponed until further notice.

In 2017, the project was granted consent by the Overseas Investment Office. In the same year NDG stated that the construction of the NDG Auckland Centre would be dependent on the City Rail Link, which was then currently under construction with an estimated completion date of 2024. The City Rail Link was opened in September 2026.

As of 2024, the site remains a car park operated by Wilson Parking, and has been one since the Royal International hotel was demolished in 1987.

== Characteristics ==
The tower would principally serve as an apartment complex targeted at the upper market, with two penthouses (445 and 590 square metres) on the top two floors and 57 levels of apartments (52 above ground, 5 below ground, all facing both west and east) for a total of about 800 residents. Three levels of retail podium and six levels of basement car parking were also proposed. The design incorporated solar panels, carbon sink plantings to offset building service emissions, and a co-generation plant for energy efficiency. A rainwater-capture system was also proposed, and two sky gardens and a public garden on the retail podium would be available for residents and customers. The sky gardens have also been mooted as breaking up the facade, providing for visual and wind movement benefits. Te Waihorotiu railway station adjoins the site.

== Construction ==
When construction was first proposed in 2007, it was estimated the project would have been completed in 2011, with the equivalent of around 500 full-time workers employed in its construction. The original developers were Dae Ju Group, a Korean construction firm that was also working on plans for other buildings around the Auckland CBD area. That firm estimated a $450 million value upon completion of the tower.

In May 2017, following approval by the Overseas Investment Office, the construction cost was estimated to be $350 million.
