= Wellington Central =

Central business district of Wellington City, New Zealand

- Suburb
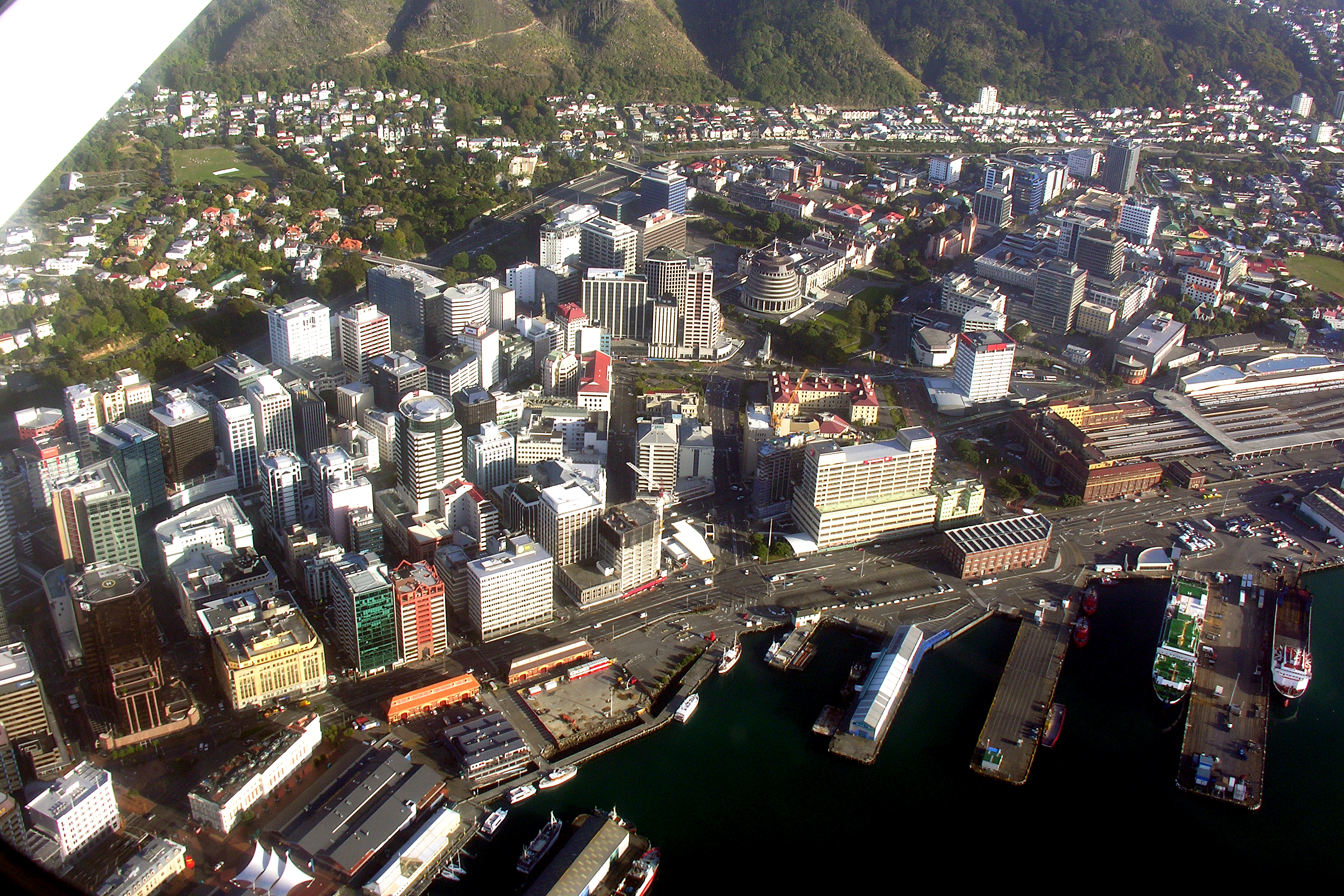
- Part of Wellington Central and Pipitea
- Interactive map of Wellington Central
- Coordinates: 41°17′02″S 174°46′41″E
- Country: New Zealand
- City: Wellington City
- Local authority: Wellington City Council
- Electoral ward: Pukehīnau/Lambton Ward; Te Whanganui-a-Tara Māori Ward

Area
  - Land: 56 ha (140 acres)

Population (June 2025)
  - Total: 3,160
  - Density: 5,600/km^{2} (15,000/sq mi)

	Pipitea
Kelburn	Wellington Central	(Wellington Harbour)
	Te Aro

Wellington Central is an inner-city suburb of Wellington, and the financial heart of both the city and the Wellington Region. It comprises the northern part of the central business district, with the majority of Wellington's high-rise buildings.

== Location ==
Wellington Central consists of the mostly flat, mostly reclaimed central area of Wellington city. Its western boundary is the Wellington Urban Motorway, beyond which lies Kelburn. To the north it is bounded by Bowen Street and Whitmore Street which divide Wellington Central from the government precinct in Pipitea. The waterfront and wharves from Tug Wharf to Taranaki Street Wharf mark the eastern boundary. To the south the suburb extends as far as Taranaki Street, Wakefield Street, across to the intersection of Willis and Boulcott Streets and up to Salamanca Road. Beyond Wellington Central to the south and east lies Te Aro, the entertainment and nightlife area of the city.

== Geography and history ==
Kumutoto kainga (a village or settlement) was located near what is now the Wellington Club on the Terrace, alongside the Kumutoto Stream. Kumutoto kainga was established by Ngāti Mutunga and Ngāti Tama when they settled at Wellington in the 1820s. The settlement became important as a flax-collection centre for several years after a flax trader bought 3.5 acres (1.4 ha) of Kumutoto land from Pomare Ngatata in 1831. Pomare Ngatata and his followers departed for the Chatham Islands in 1835, and Wi Tako Ngātata then settled at Kumutoto for a few years. The kainga was abandoned by 1850.

The first European settlers arrived at Petone in 1840, but when that area proved prone to flooding the settlement was moved around the harbour to what is now Wellington Central. Lambton Quay and Willis Street mark the original waterfront, where wharves were built and businesses established. There was very little flat land available in Wellington Central: wealthy people built houses on the Terrace overlooking Lambton Quay, while poorer people lived on the swampy land at Te Aro. Reclamation of Wellington Harbour began in the mid-nineteenth century and continued into the 1970s, providing land for building most of the central business district that is included in Wellington Central.

Several small streams that came off the hills towards the harbour were piped underground as development intensified: these include the Kumutoto Stream which formerly flowed through properties along the Terrace as far as the Wellington Club before turning to run down a gully that is now Woodward Street to the former shoreline at Lambton Quay. The stream was culverted in stages in the nineteenth century, beginning in 1866.

As land was reclaimed and the city grew, many large businesses, hotels, and department stores were built in Wellington Central, while the Te Aro end of the city remained low-rise, containing markets, warehouses and working-class housing. The first commercial high-rise office building in Wellington was Massey House, built in the early 1950s on Lambton Quay with a façade on the Terrace. In 1960 Shell House (now Transpower House) at 96-102 The Terrace became the first modern office block built on the Terrace, and the first building in New Zealand to be fully air-conditioned. The James Cook Hotel opened on the Terrace in 1972 and was at that time the tallest building in New Zealand. Other large hotels in Wellington Central included the Hotel Arcadia (Lambton Quay 1905-1938) and the Midland Hotel (Lambton Quay, 1915-1982).

After an earthquake in November 1968 caused minor damage to many central city buildings, Wellington City Council introduced rules requiring older buildings to meet standards for earthquake resistance. Many Victorian and Edwardian two- or three-storey commercial buildings in Wellington Central were demolished and replaced with high-rise buildings. For example, on Lambton Quay, 69 older buildings that existed in 1970 were demolished during the 1970s and early 1980s and replaced with 18 much larger office blocks.

Earthquake strengthening in Wellington Central is ongoing.

Many of Wellington Central's high-rise buildings on reclaimed land are very close to the water table. Some basements get water in them during extreme high tides because groundwater cannot drain away, so most high-rises with basements below sea level have pumps in them to keep water seepage out. This problem was demonstrated during earthquake-strengthening of the Town Hall, which is on reclaimed land at the bottom of Cuba Street. A worker said that strengthening the basement was one of the project's biggest challenges: "We joked a lot about it because we would talk about the river that was running through the basement at one point. It literally looked like a river, so it was probably about two metres wide, and it was continual ocean flowing through". Water flowing through the basement had to be channelled elsewhere so that work could be carried out.

== Landmarks ==
The 'Golden Mile' refers to Wellington's main shopping and entertainment streets. It runs through Wellington Central from Lambton Quay, which is the city's premiere retail street, and lower Willis Street, before passing to Manners Street and Courtenay Place which are in the suburb of Te Aro. Public transport runs along this spine, and the Wellington Cable Car is accessible from Lambton Quay.

Wellington Central is also home to Wellington's civic precinct at Te Ngākau Civic Square, home to the Wellington Town Hall, Wellington Central Library, the Michael Fowler Centre, and City Gallery Wellington. The Supreme Court is just within Wellington Central, as is the New Zealand stock exchange centre.

As of 2025, the ten tallest buildings in Wellington are situated in Wellington Central. These include Wellington's tallest building, the Majestic Centre on Willis Street, and the Aon Centre. The Aon Centre is located at 1 Willis Street. At the time of its completion in 1984 after a long period of controversy and industrial action, it was New Zealand's tallest building.

Much of Wellington's publicly-accessible waterfront is in Wellington Central. Queens Wharf was developed as an entertainment destination in the 1990s. Queens Wharf Retail Centre and Queens Wharf Events Centre opened in 1995. These large buildings were designed by the architect to look like wharf sheds to harmonise with their surroundings. The retail centre was an immediate failure, and the building was sold in 1998 to be converted into office space. The events centre, now known as TSB Arena, still operates and hosts music concerts, sports and other events. Two old goods sheds on the wharf, Shed 3 and Shed 5, were turned into restaurants, and there are other entertainment-related businesses including rock-climbing and kayak hire on the waterfront.

Further north along the waterfront, Kumototo Precinct was developed near Tug Wharf. In 2011, designer toilets nicknamed 'lobster loos' were opened between Tug Wharf and Queens Wharf. Ngā Kina, a sculpture of giant kina (sea urchins) by Michael Tuffery, was installed at the water's edge next to Tug Wharf in 2012.

== Demographics ==
Wellington Central statistical area covers 0.56 km^{2} (0.22 sq mi). It had an estimated population of 3,160 as of June 2025, with a population density of 5,643 people per km^{2}.

Historical population
Year	Pop.	±% p.a.
2006	1,992	—
2013	2,886	+5.44%
2018	3,000	+0.78%
2023	3,018	+0.12%

Wellington Central had a population of 3,018 in the 2023 New Zealand census, an increase of 18 people (0.6%) since the 2018 census, and an increase of 132 people (4.6%) since the 2013 census. There were 1,440 males, 1,518 females, and 60 people of other genders in 1,380 dwellings. 17.1% of people identified as LGBTIQ+. The median age was 26.4 years (compared with 38.1 years nationally). There were 84 people (2.8%) aged under 15 years, 1,698 (56.3%) aged 15 to 29, 1,029 (34.1%) aged 30 to 64, and 204 (6.8%) aged 65 or older.

People could identify as more than one ethnicity. The results were 68.1% European (Pākehā); 10.7% Māori; 4.6% Pasifika; 26.1% Asian; 2.6% Middle Eastern, Latin American and African New Zealanders (MELAA); and 1.4% other, which includes people giving their ethnicity as "New Zealander". English was spoken by 98.3%, Māori by 2.7%, Samoan by 1.5%, and other languages by 26.9%. No language could be spoken by 0.7% (e.g. too young to talk). New Zealand Sign Language was known by 0.4%. The percentage of people born overseas was 40.3, compared with 28.8% nationally.

Religious affiliations were 23.5% Christian, 4.2% Hindu, 4.0% Islam, 0.7% Māori religious beliefs, 1.7% Buddhist, 0.6% New Age, 0.3% Jewish, and 2.2% other religions. People who answered that they had no religion were 58.9%, and 4.6% of people did not answer the census question.

Of those at least 15 years old, 1,266 (43.1%) people had a bachelor's or higher degree, 1,347 (45.9%) had a post-high school certificate or diploma, and 315 (10.7%) people exclusively held high school qualifications. The median income was $36,600, compared with $41,500 nationally. 525 people (17.9%) earned over $100,000 compared to 12.1% nationally. The employment status of those at least 15 was 1,419 (48.4%) full-time, 513 (17.5%) part-time, and 159 (5.4%) unemployed.

== See also ==
- Wellington Urban Motorway
- Whitmore Street
- Willis Street
