= Jack Manning (architect) =

New Zealand architect (1928–2021)

- Born: John Wilfred Manning; 12 October 1928; Auckland, New Zealand
- Died: 8 October 2021 (aged 92); Auckland, New Zealand
- Education: University of Auckland
- Occupation: Architect
- Awards: 2011 Gold Medal of the New Zealand Institute of Architects.
- Practice: Thorpe, Cutter, Pickmere & Douglas; Manning Mitchell; Manning and Associates; Group Architects

John Wilfred Manning (12 October 1928 – 8 October 2021) was a New Zealand architect from Auckland. He is well known for a wide variety of designs including houses (particularly his own house at Stanley Bay, Cathcart House (Te Kāhui Whaihanga New Zealand Institute of Architects (NZIA) Supreme Award 2006), and large commercial buildings. He was a fellow of the NZIA and was the recipient of its highest honour, the Gold Medal, in 2011.

== Early life ==
Manning was born on 12 October 1928. He grew up in Devonport and Takapuna, and was educated at St Peter's College, Auckland.

== Projects ==
Manning's many projects include three which are particularly prominent.

=== AMP Building, Auckland ===
Manning designed one of the first Ludwig Mies van der Rohe style skyscrapers built in New Zealand, the AMP Building (1962 – Thorpe, Cutter, Pickmere & Douglas) on the corner of Queen and Victoria Streets, Auckland. Revolutionary features, for its time, include structure based on a concrete frame, sheathed with a curtain wall consisting of aluminium frames clad with stainless steel, and glazed with units of heat-absorbing glass and green opaque spandrels. The ground floor columns are clad with black ebony granite.

=== Majestic Centre, Wellington ===
The Majestic Centre (1989–1991), a large commercial complex is located close to, and visible from, Wellington's Civic Square. The Majestic Tower rises from Boulcott Street and is very prominent, especially at night when its horizontally spread fan of metal rods tipped with powerful light bulbs is illuminated. Its three-story podium, forming a street frontage to Willis Street, is split at midpoint by an open six-storied gallery linked to the base of the tower. The street frontage incorporates five distinct buildings: the Edwardian façade of Preston Meats; a newly inserted three-storeyed building of no particular quality; the massive central entry topped with a metal and glass canopy; and a flat granite surface glazed above, which finally slopes away to Dr Henry Pollen's House designed by William Turnbull whose style is exuberantly French Empire but built in wood. This great house is located on the corner site, moved down from further up Boulcott Street. On Willis St, granite colonnades, ended before Turnbull's house and leading to shops behind, providing pedestrian shelter along the frontage. The colonnades were subsequently built in.

=== University of Auckland School of Music ===
The School of Music (1980) (designed with David Mitchell) represents a departure from the Brutalist norm of that period, although in a completely different post-modernist style. The building won the NZIA supreme national award in 1986, and in 2013 received an enduring architecture award from the NZIA.

=== Other projects ===
- Auckland Central Library
- Auckland College of Education, Epsom, Auckland
- Cathcart House
- Manning House

== Later life ==
Manning died on 8 October 2021, aged 92 years.
