= List of tallest buildings in Wellington =

Skyline of Wellington
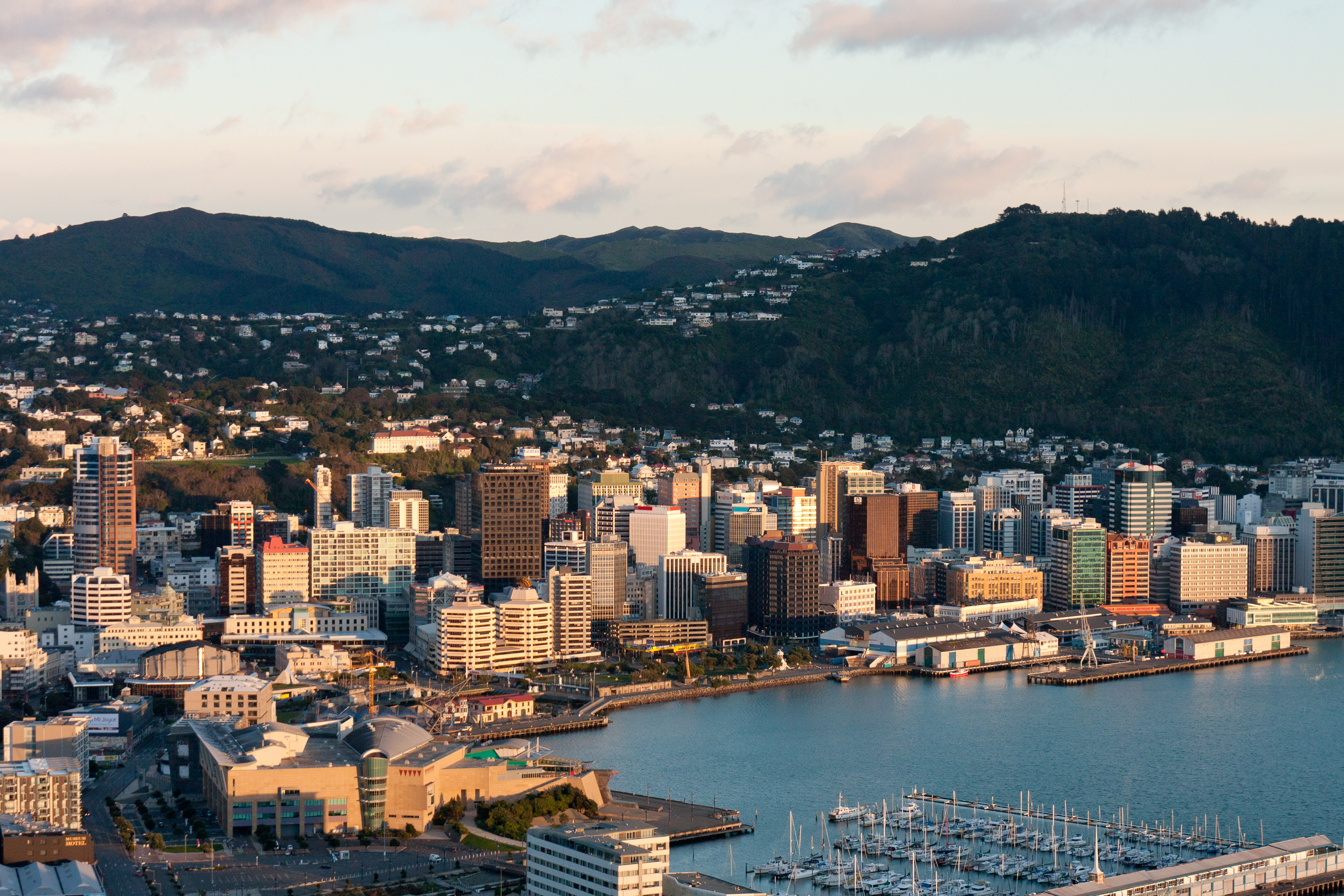
- Wellington Central
- Tallest building: Majestic Centre (1991)
- Tallest building height: 116 m (381 ft)

Number of tall buildings
- 20 stories or more: 11 (2025)
- Taller than 100 m (328 ft): 3 (2025)

This list of tallest buildings in Wellington ranks the tallest buildings in the New Zealand capital city of Wellington by height. This ranking system, created by the US-based Council on Tall Buildings and Urban Habitat includes the height to a spire but not to an antenna. The Majestic Centre is the tallest skyscraper in the city at 116 metres (381 ft).

== Tallest buildings ==
The list below contains the top 60 buildings in the city at least 150 metres (490 ft) high. All are high-rises except for the 1st, 2nd and 3rd ranked buildings which are skyscrapers.

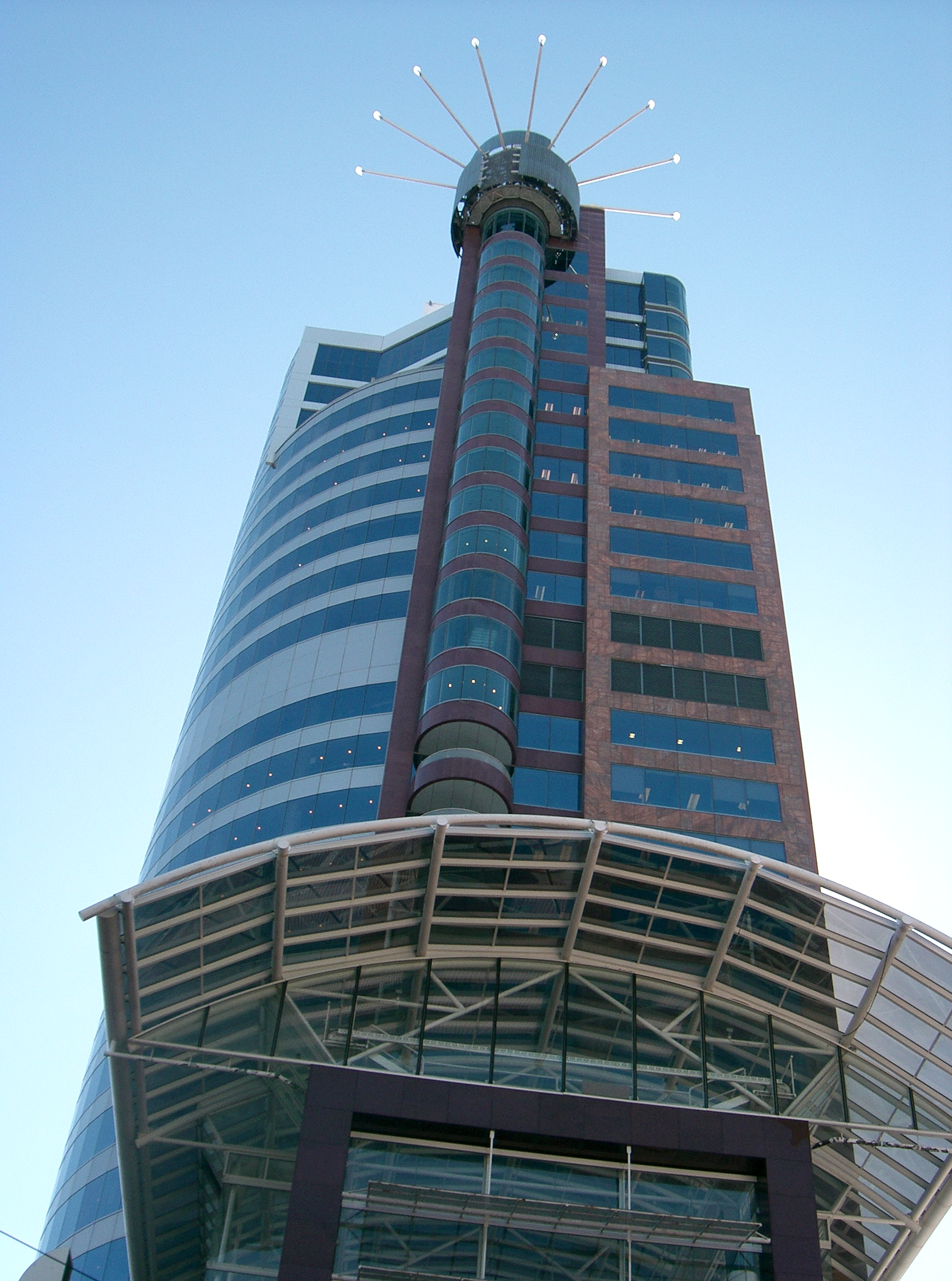
The Majestic Centre, the tallest building in Wellington

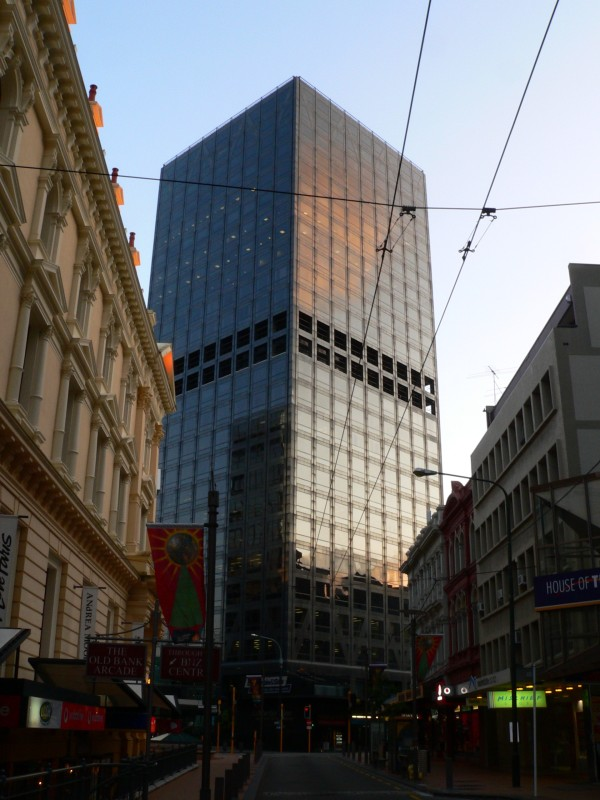
The Aon Centre, the 2nd tallest building in Wellington

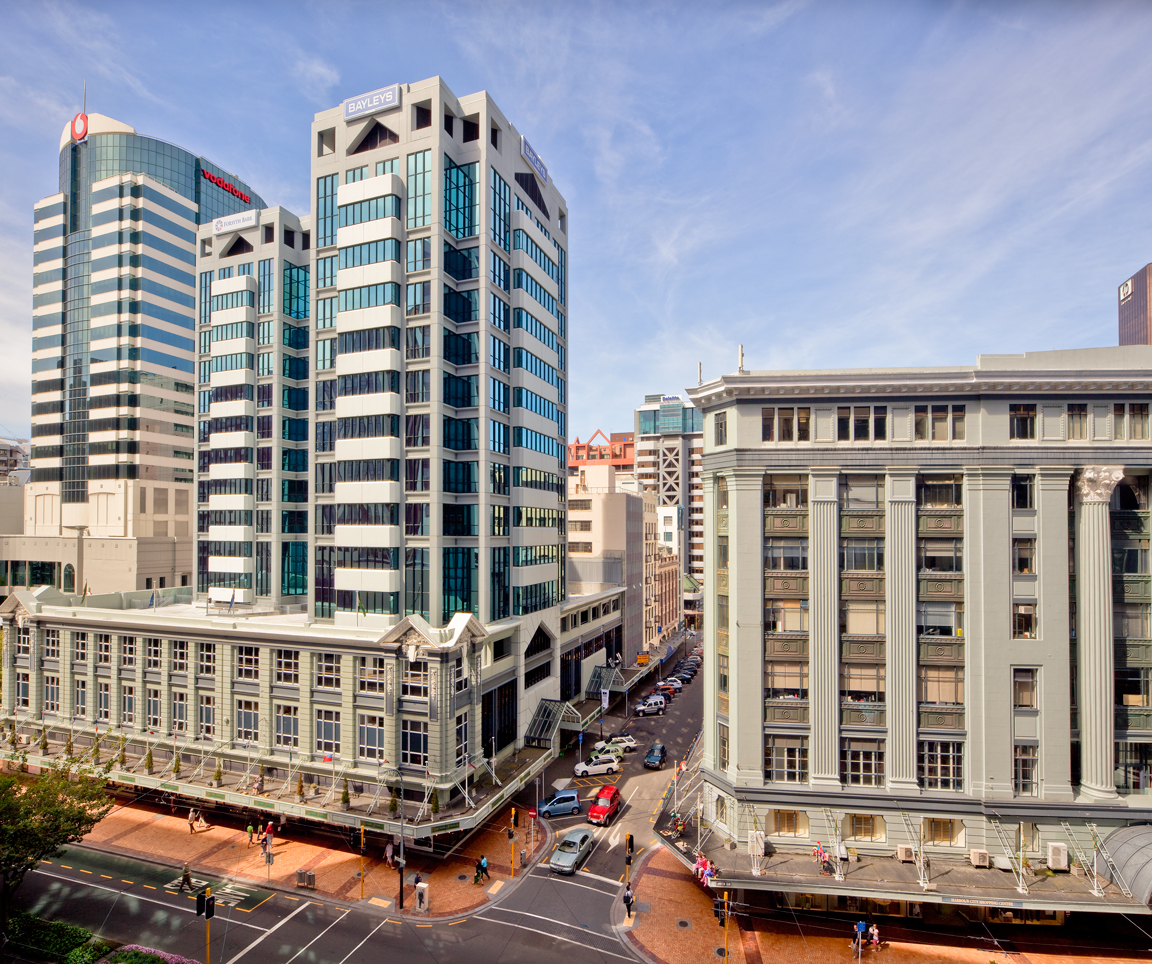
NTT Tower (left), Forsyth Barr House, and Bayleys.

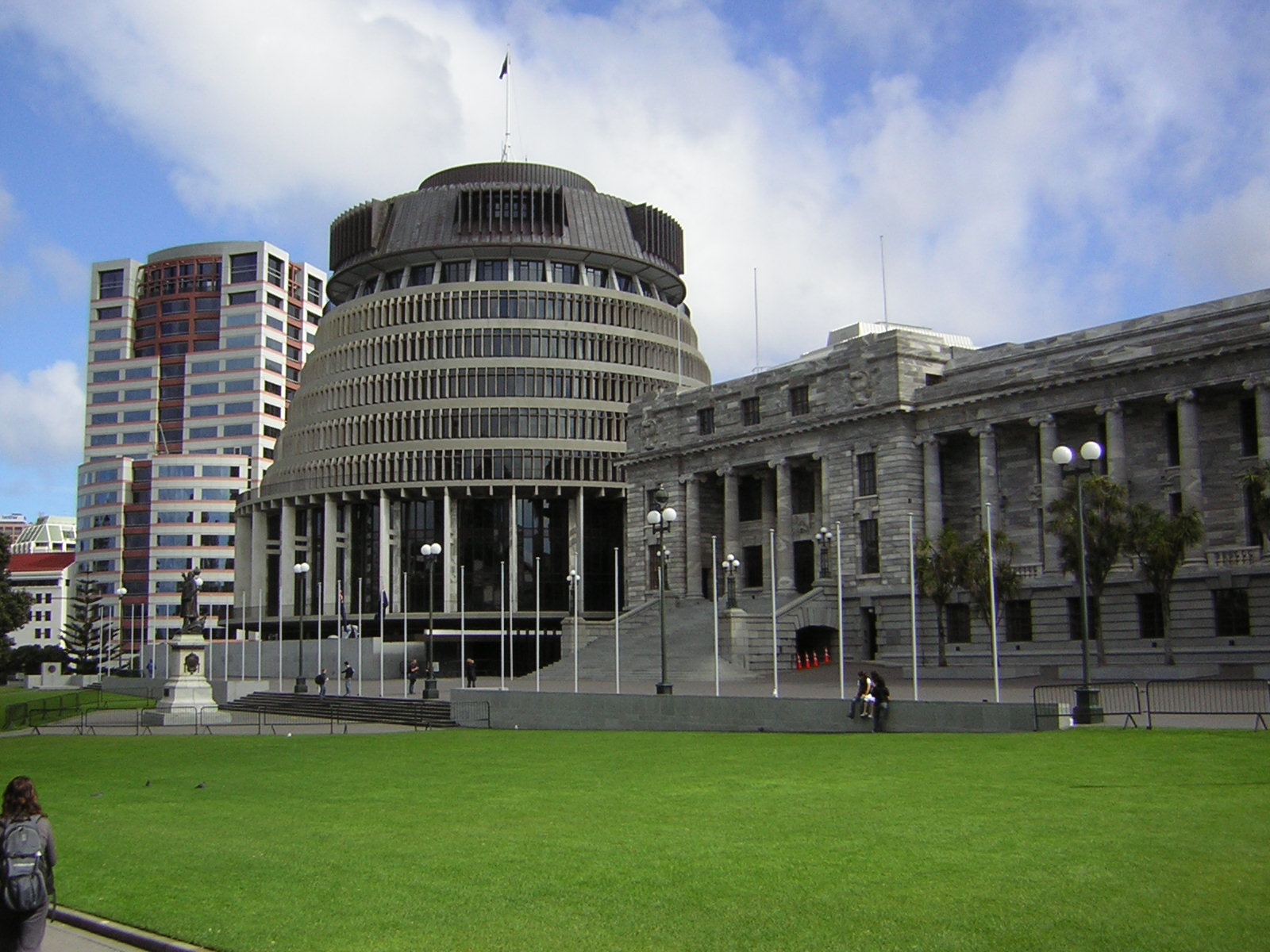
Bowen House (left) and the Beehive

#	Name	Image	Height	Floors	Built	Purpose	Notes
1	Majestic Centre; 100 Willis St		116 m (381 ft)	29	1991	Office	
2	Aon Centre; 1 Willis St		103 m (338 ft)	27	1984	Office	Originally opened as the BNZ Centre
3	HSBC Tower; 195 Lambton Quay		101 m (331 ft)	25	2003	Office	Is 94 m to roof height and 101 m to the Spire
4	NTT Tower; 157 Lambton Quay		93 m (305 ft)	25	1998	Office	Formerly Mobil on the Park, Vodafone on the Park and Dimension Data Tower
5	Bowen House; 1 Bowen St		90 m (295 ft)	22	1991	Office	
6	James Cook Hotel Grand Chancellor; 147 The Terrace		88 m (289 ft)	26	1972/1998	Hotel	
7	Plimmer Towers		84 m (276 ft)	25	1975/1986	Hotel/Office	Originally opened as the Williams Centre
8	125 The Terrace		77 m (253 ft)	21	1986	Office	
9	Morrison Kent House; 105 The Terrace		76 m (249 ft)	21	1969	Office	
10=	113 The Terrace		72 m (236 ft)	19	1988	Office	Formerly PricewaterhouseCoopers Tower; currently the home of Wellington City Council
10=	The Beehive		72 m (236 ft)	10	1981	Office	
12=	111 Dixon Street		70 m (230 ft)	20	2019	Residential	Tallest residential building in Wellington.
12=	Maritime Tower; 10 Customhouse Quay		70 m (230 ft)	18	2006	Office	
12=	Grant Thornton House; 215 Lambton Quay		70 m (230 ft)	18	1983	Office	Formerly known as ANZ Tower
12=	Westpac Tower; Lambton Quay		70 m (230 ft)	18	1974	Office	
12=	Chews Lane Tower		70 m (230 ft)	19	2009	Office/Residential	
17=	Aurora Centre		68 m (223 ft)	19	1968	Office	Was the tallest building in Wellington when completed. Underwent a major facelift in 2016–17.
17=	Equinox House; 111 The Terrace		68 m (223 ft)	16	1987	Office	
17=	Radio New Zealand House; 155 The Terrace		68 m (223 ft)	13	1963	Office	
20=	Fujitsu Tower; 141 The Terrace		66 m (217 ft)	18	1985	Office	Formerly known as Caltex Tower
20=	Novell House; 89 The Terrace		66 m (217 ft)	17	1975	Office	Formerly known as Fletcher House.
20=	No.1 The Terrace		66 m (217 ft)	17	1978	Office	Headquarters of the New Zealand Treasury
20=	Vogel Building; 8 Aitken Street		66 m (217 ft)	17	1966	Office	Was the tallest building in Wellington and the 2nd tallest building in New Zealand when built.
20=	Reserve Bank of New Zealand; 2 The Terrace		66 m (217 ft)	16	1972	Office	
25=	AXA Tower; 80 The Terrace		65 m (213 ft)	17	1989	Office	80 The Terrace.
25=	The Freyberg Building; 20 Aitken Street		65 m (213 ft)	15	1979	Office	The adjoining 7-storey Freyberg House (2007) was demolished after the 2016 earthquake.
27	One Whitmore Street		63 m (207 ft)	14	2023	Commercial	BNZ's Wellington office.
28	20 Customhouse Quay		62 m (203 ft)	14	2018	Commercial	Replaced BP House, which was originally built in 1968 and demolished following the 2013 Seddon earthquake.
29	Charles Fergusson Building; 38 Bowen Street		61 m (200 ft)	17	1976	Office	Redeveloped in 2018.
30	New Zealand Police National Headquarters; 180 Molesworth Street		60.47 m (198 ft)	17	1979	Office	Formerly FAI Insurance House.
31=	Bolton Hotel; 12 Bolton Street		60 m (197 ft)	20	2004	Hotel	
31=	Sovereign Insurance Centre		60 m (197 ft)	17	1984	Office	
31=	Bayleys Building; 36 Brandon Street		60 m (197 ft)	16	1989	Office	
31=	Two Hunter Street		60 m (197 ft)	16	1991	Office	
31=	City Tower		60 m (197 ft)	16	1991	Office	
31=	Jellioce Towers; 189–191 The Terrace		60 m (197 ft)	16	1965	Residential	Was the tallest residential building in Wellington when built
31=	Forsyth Barr House; 41 Johnston Street		60 m (197 ft)	16	1989	Office	
31=	Pastoral House; 25 The Terrace		60 m (197 ft)	15	1978	Office	
39=	Rydges Hotel; 75 Featherston Street		57 m (187 ft)	16	2006	Hotel	Originally opened as a Holiday Inn
39=	Alcatel Lucent House; 13 Manners Street		57 m (187 ft)	15	1988	Office	Formerly Telecom House
41=	Quest on Johnston; 35 Johnston Street		55 m (180 ft)	18	2000	Hotel	
41=	Terrace Heights Apartments; 163 The Terrace		55 m (180 ft)	17	1999	Residential	
41=	Stafford House; 40 The Terrace		55 m (180 ft)	14	1977	Residential	Originally an office block, now UniLodge apartments.
41=	Avalon Studios; 41 Percy Street; Avalon, Lower Hutt		55 m (180 ft)	11	1969	Office	Lower Hutt. Tallest building in the Wellington region outside of the Wellington CBD.
45	Sir Robert Jones Tower; 150 Featherston Street		52 m (171 ft)	14	2019	Office	
46	National War Memorial		51 m (167 ft)		1932	Bell and clock tower	
47=	20 Oriental Parade		50 m (164 ft)	16		Residential	
47=	Public Trust Building; 129 Lambton Quay		50 m (164 ft)	15	1982	Office	
47=	Investment House		50 m (164 ft)	15	1977	Office	
47=	Simpl House; 40 Mercer Street		50 m (164 ft)	15	1987	Office	
47=	Willeston Centre		50 m (164 ft)	14	1984?	Office	Originally the Colonial Mutual Life Insurance Building.
47=	AMI Plaza; 342 Lambton Quay		50 m (164 ft)	14		Office	
47=	Rutherford House; 33 Bunny Street		50 m (164 ft)	14	1975	Office	Originally the headquarters of the NZ Electricity Department.
47=	Sovereign House; 34–42 Manners Street		50 m (164 ft)	14	1988	Office	
47=	Cornerstone House; 36 Customhouse Quay		50 m (164 ft)	14	1987	Office	Formerly named Castrol House.
47=	Westpac Trust Investment House		50 m (164 ft)	14	1982	Office	
47=	TechnologyOne House; 86 Victoria Street		50 m (164 ft)	13	1987	Office	Formerly known as the Renouf Centre and Terenco Finance House
47=	BNZ Trust House; 50 Manners Street		50 m (164 ft)	13	1985	Office	
47=	Guardian Trust House; 15 Willeston Street		50 m (164 ft)	13	1984	Office	
47=	Optimation House; 1 Grey Street		50 m (164 ft)	12	1979	Office	
47=	Pinnacle on Victoria; 160 Victoria Street		50 m (164 ft)	17	2021	Residential	

== Under construction or approved ==
Name		Height	Floors	Built	Purpose	Notes
1	109 Featherston Street Tower	89 m (292 ft)	19		Commercial	Approved resource consent
2	110 Wakefield Street Tower	86 m (282 ft)	22		Commercial	Approved resource consent

== Demolished ==
Name	Height	Floors	Built	Purpose	Notes
Revera House	50 m (164 ft)	10	1990	Office	Formerly AT&T Tower and Hitachi House. Demolished 2018 following damage due to the 2016 Kaikōura earthquake.
61 Molesworth St	37 m (121 ft)	10	1965	Office	Formerly ICI House. Demolished 2016–2017 following damage due to the 2016 Kaikōura earthquake. To be replaced with a new 11/12-storey office building.

== Cancelled ==
Name	Height*	Floors*	Notes
NZ1	263 m (863 ft)	63	A high rise commercial and mixed use building proposed for Lambton Quay. Project was scrapped after the developer went bankrupt. If completed, the building would have been New Zealand's tallest.
Lambton Tower	≈120 metres (394 ft)	31	Proposed in 1991 for the Wellington waterfront.
Wakefield Central	≈75 metres (246 ft)	20	Proposed in 1986 by Chase Corporation on the site now occupied by Courtenay Central.

== Timeline of tallest buildings ==
Name	Height	Years Tallest	Other Facts
MLC Building	45 m (148 ft)	1939–1961	9 stories high. Was arguably the tallest in NZ when built.
Shell House	46 m (151 ft)	1961–1966	Tallest office building in NZ when built.
Vogel Building	66 m (217 ft)	1966–1968	Was the 2nd tallest in NZ when built
Aurora Centre	68 m (223 ft)	1968–1969	Was the 2nd tallest in NZ when built
Morrison Kent House	76 m (249 ft)	1969–1975	Was the 2nd tallest in NZ (to 1 Queen Street, Auckland) when built
Plimmer Towers	85 m (279 ft)	1975–1984	Was the tallest in NZ when built, is 106m and 31 floors from the Lambton Quay side of the tower
Aon Centre	103 m (338 ft)	1984–1991	Was the tallest in NZ when built and is one of Wellington's most iconic buildings
Majestic Centre	116 m (381 ft)	1991–present	Is the furthest south skyscraper in the world. Was the tallest in New Zealand when built until the ANZ Centre opened in Auckland a few months later.

== See also ==
- List of tallest structures in New Zealand
- List of tallest buildings in Auckland
- List of tallest buildings in Christchurch
- List of tallest buildings in Oceania
