= List of tallest structures in New Zealand =

This is a list of the tallest structures in New Zealand. It includes all structures to their highest point however building heights listed are only to the Architectural height and non architectural features on buildings are not included in their height.

== Tallest existing structures ==
Rank	Name	Image	City	Height	Floors	Year	Notes
1	Sky Tower		Auckland	328 metres (1,076 ft)	71 equivalent	1997	Tallest structure in New Zealand. 2nd tallest freestanding structure in the Southern Hemisphere.
2	New Plymouth Power Station chimney		New Plymouth	198 metres (650 ft)	none	1974	Decommissioned in 2008 but the chimney still stands.
3	PwC Tower at Commercial Bay		Auckland	180.1 metres (591 ft)	41	2020	Topped out in June 2019, and it is currently the tallest building in New Zealand.
4	The Pacifica		Auckland	178 metres (584 ft)	57	2020	Tallest residential building and by floor count in New Zealand
5	Vero Centre		Auckland	172 metres (564 ft)	38	2000	2nd tallest office building in New Zealand.
6=	Waipipi Wind Farm turbines		near Waverley	160 metres (525 ft)	none	2020	31 turbines, 95 m (312 ft) to hub, 130 m (427 ft) rotor diameter. Tallest wind turbines in New Zealand.
6=	51 Albert Street		Auckland	160 metres (525 ft)	43	2024	
7	Metropolis		Auckland	155 metres (509 ft)	40	1999	
8	ANZ Centre		Auckland	153 metres (502 ft)	35	1991	
9=	Huntly Power Station chimneys		Huntly	150 metres (492 ft)	none	1983	Power station main chimneys
9=	The Sentinel Apartments		Auckland	150 metres (492 ft)	30	2007	
11	HSBC Tower		Auckland	142 metres (466 ft)	30	2002	Former Pwc Tower
12=	Titahi Bay AM radio transmitter, second mast		Porirua	137 metres (449 ft)	none	1937/1979	
12=	Tiwai Point Aluminium Smelter chimney		near Bluff	137 metres (449 ft)	none	1970	Tallest structure in the South Island
14	Voco Hotel and Holiday Inn		Auckland	135 metres (443 ft)	41	2021	
15	Oaks Residences		Auckland	130 metres (427 ft)	38	2006	
16	Lumley Centre		Auckland	125 metres (410 ft)	29	2005	
17	Sugarloaf television transmitter tower		Christchurch	121 metres (397 ft)	none	1965	Height from sea level to top is 614 m.
18	Quay West		Auckland	117 metres (384 ft)	20	1997	
19=	Majestic Centre		Wellington	116 metres (381 ft)	29	1991	Tallest office building in Wellington.
19=	ASB Bank Centre		Auckland	116 metres (381 ft)	29	1991	
21	Precinct Apartments		Auckland	115 metres (377 ft)	33	2003	
22	Crowne Plaza		Auckland	110 metres (361 ft)	29	1990	
23	Parks Residences		Auckland	109 metres (358 ft)	30	2018	
24	Queen's Residences		Auckland	107 metres (358 ft)	29	2016	
25	BNZ Tower		Auckland	106 metres (348 ft)	28	1987	
26=	Ohaaki Power Station cooling tower		30 km NE of Taupō	105 metres (344 ft)	none	1989	
26=	Mount Cargill television transmitter		Dunedin	105 metres (344 ft)	none	1970	
28=	IAG Tower		Auckland	104 metres (341 ft)	29	1988	Formerly the headquarters of Fay Richwhite.
28=	DLA Piper Tower		Auckland	104 metres (341 ft)	26	1987	
30	State Insurance Building		Wellington	103 metres (338 ft)	26	1984	Headquarters of the BNZ from 1984 to 1998.
31	HSBC Tower, Wellington		Wellington	101 metres (331 ft)	25	2003	
32=	Waiatarua television transmitter		Auckland	100 metres (328 ft)	none	1965	
32=	Mount Kaukau television transmitter		Wellington	100 metres (328 ft)	none	1967	Originally 122 metres (400 ft), height reduced in 2022.
34	80 Queen Street		Auckland	100 metres (328 ft)	23	2009	
35	120 Albert Street		Auckland	95 metres (312 ft)	26	1990	
36	Vodafone on The Park		Wellington	93 metres (305 ft)	25	1998	Formerly Mobil on the Park.
37=	Wharite Peak television transmitter		near Woodville	92 metres (302 ft)	none	1966	Originally 122 metres (400 ft), height reduced in 2015 and 2019.
37=	Qantas House		Auckland	92 metres (302 ft)	24	1986	
39=	CityLife Auckland		Auckland	90 metres (295 ft)	26	1998	
39=	City Gardens		Auckland	90 metres (295 ft)	28	2004	
39=	Bowen House		Wellington	90 metres (295 ft)	22	1991	Tallest Government building.
42=	National Bank Tower		Auckland	88 metres (289 ft)	21	1988	Formerly Arthur Andersen Tower.
42=	Stamford Plaza Auckland		Auckland	88 metres (289 ft)	20	1983/2008	Extra storeys were added in 2008.
42=	InterContinental Wellington		Wellington	88 metres (289 ft)	26	1988	
45	AMP Tower (Quay Tower)		Auckland	87 metres (285 ft)	22	1980	
46	Pacific Tower		Christchurch	86 metres (282 ft)	23	2010	Tallest building in the South Island.
47	Gen-i Tower		Auckland	85 metres (279 ft)	22	2000	
48	Travelodge Plimmer Towers		Wellington	84 metres (276 ft)	20	1975	Originally built as the Williams Centre. Tallest building in Wellington until 1984.
49	1 Queen Street		Auckland	81 metres (266 ft)	20	1973	Former HSBC Building
50=	AXA Centre		Auckland	80 metres (262 ft)	20	1995	
50=	Victoria Residences		Auckland	80 metres (262 ft)	24	2018	
52	125 The Terrace		Wellington	77 metres (253 ft)	21	1986	
53=	SkyCity Grand		Auckland	75 metres (246 ft)	24	2004	
53=	Altitude Apartments		Auckland	75 metres (246 ft)	22	2004	
55	West Plaza		Auckland	74 metres (243 ft)	18	1974	

== Demolished structures ==
Name	City	Height	Floors	Year	Notes
Titahi Bay AM radio transmitter, main mast	Porirua	212 metres (696 ft)	none	1937/1979	Demolition completed 16 February 2016
Hotel Grand Chancellor, Christchurch	Christchurch	85 metres (279 ft)	26	1986	Demolition completed following the 2011 Canterbury earthquake. Is the 80th tallest building ever demolished and the tallest in New Zealand.
Price Waterhouse Building	Christchurch	79 metres (259 ft)	20	1988	Demolition completed following the 2011 Canterbury earthquake.

== Proposed structures ==
Name	City	Height*	Floors*	Year*	Notes
Pumanawa Downtown West Tower A	Auckland	227 metres (745 ft)	57	2032	Mixed use tower. Construction to start in 2027, after demolition of the existing carpark on the site.
NDG Auckland Centre	Auckland	209 metres (686 ft)	52	2020	Resource consent was granted in February 2014, but building consent is yet to be approved. On the site of the Elliott Tower proposal.
Kaiwaikawe Wind Farm turbines	near Dargaville	206 metres (676 ft)		2026	Under construction. 12 turbines, 125 m (410 ft) to hub, 162 m (531 ft) rotor diameter.
1 Mills Lane	Auckland	190 metres (623 ft)	37		Proposed
Seascape	Auckland	187 metres (614 ft)	56	2025	Construction suspended in 2024.
65 Federal Street	Auckland	180 metres (591 ft)	48	2024	Approved
Pumanawa Downtown West Tower B	Auckland	162 metres (531 ft)	45	2032	Office tower. Construction to start in 2027, after demolition of the existing carpark on the site.
Burj Takapuna	Auckland	153 metres (502 ft)	39	2027	Approved
Saffron Tower	Auckland	145 metres (476 ft)	45	2018	Approved
St James Suites	Auckland	136 metres (446 ft)	36	2018	Demolition of buildings on the site was completed in 2016, but a bank withdrew funding and by July 2019 construction had not been started.
Dunedin Waterfront Hotel	Dunedin	97 metres (318 ft)	28		Application declined in June 2013, but going back to appeal. Would be the tallest building in the South Island.

== Abandoned proposals ==
Name	City	Height*	Floors*	Notes
Victoria Square Tower	Christchurch	167 metres (548 ft)	5-6	Approved by council but eventually cancelled following public backlash. Plans included a revolving restaurant, observation gallery, casino and nightclub. Would have been tallest building or tower in New Zealand at time of completion.
Elliott Tower	Auckland	232 metres (761 ft)	68	This project was approved, but construction never went ahead, and the site was later sold.

== See also ==
- List of tallest buildings in Auckland
- List of tallest buildings in Wellington
- List of tallest buildings in Christchurch
- List of tallest buildings in Oceania
