= Plimmer Towers =

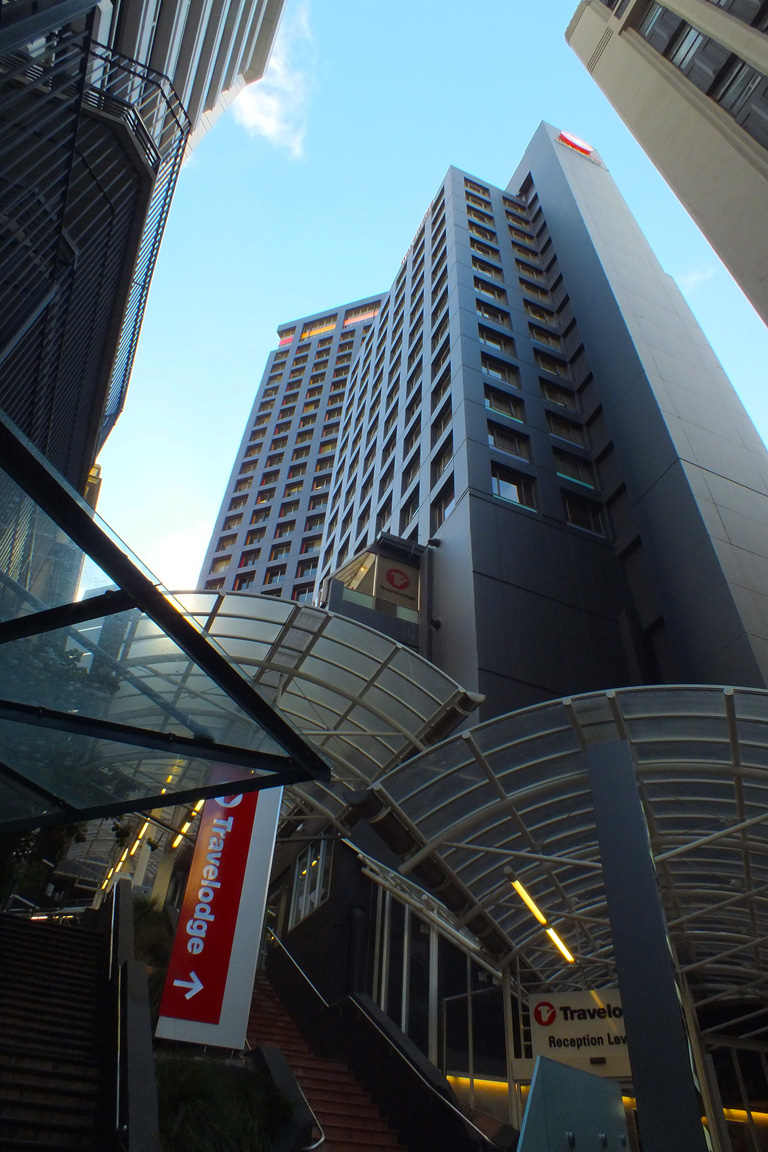

General information
- Type: Office & hotel
- Architectural style: Late Modern
- Location: Plimmer Steps, Wellington, New Zealand
- Coordinates: 41°17′9″S 174°46′30″E
- Current tenants: Brother NZ, Travelodge
- Completed: 1977
- Owner: Eureka Funds Management, Toga Group

Height
- Height: 84 metres (276 ft)

Technical details
- Floor count: 31

Design and construction
- Main contractor: Williams Construction

Plimmer Towers is a high-rise office, hotel and car park complex in central Wellington, New Zealand, named after John Plimmer, active in business and politics during Wellington's early years. The office building is 84 m (276 ft) high and has 31 storeys. It was the tallest building in New Zealand until Auckland's Quay Tower opened in 1981.

== History ==
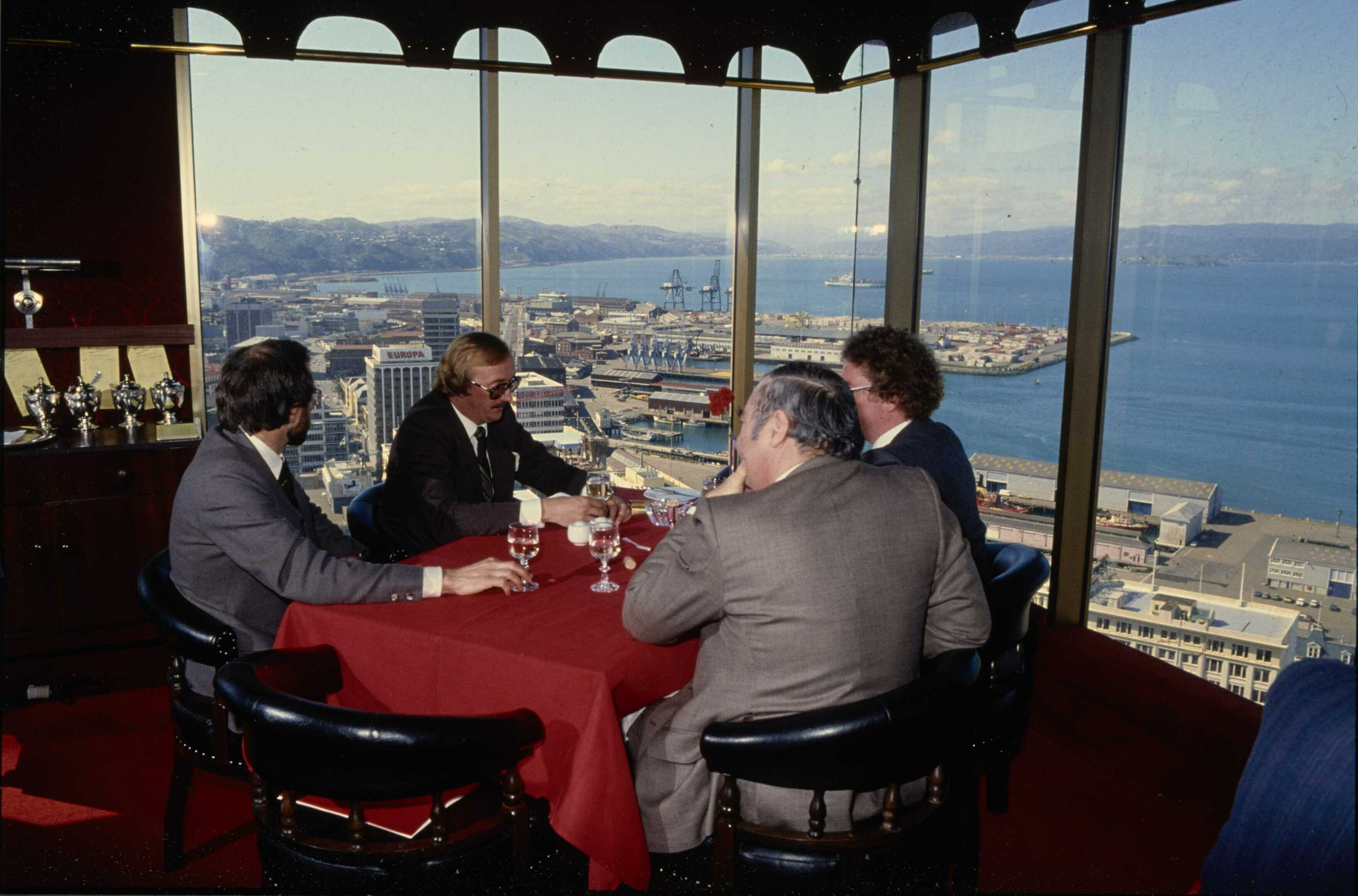
Diners at 'Windows on Wellington' restaurant in 1981

Plimmer Towers is located at the corner of Boulcott Street and Gilmer Terrace, and can also be accessed from Lambton Quay via Plimmer Steps. The complex was originally developed by construction tycoon Arthur Williams and known as the Williams Centre. The multi-level car parking building was completed in 1963, followed by the office building which opened in 1973 as the Williams Centre and is now called Plimmer Towers. It is built of reinforced concrete with pre-stressed concrete beams. Plimmer Towers was New Zealand's tallest building until Quay Tower opened in Auckland in 1981, and was Wellington's tallest building until 1984, when the nearby BNZ Centre opened. It featured a penthouse restaurant on the 31st floor called 'Windows on Wellington' which offered a piano bar and excellent views across the city. Windows on Wellington closed, and the restaurant reopened as '31' in July 1985.

A second tower, the Plimmer Towers Hotel, was completed in 1986. When built it contained 96 serviced apartments but the layout was later modified and the building became a hotel with 132 guest rooms. This building consists of 13 storeys built on top of a six-storey building completed in 1976 after the first tower was built. The original six-storey building had been constructed with future expansion in mind, so had foundations that could cope with the additional floors.

Williams sold the complex to Smart Group NZ in 1986, which was then severely affected by the 1987 sharemarket crash. The complex was later purchased by the Singapore-based Grand Central Group in 1993, by which time it was renamed the Plimmer City Centre, with the hotel section rebranded as a Copthorne hotel.

In 2010, the complex was refurbished and repainted by its then owners, Australian-based Eureka Funds Management and the Toga Group. Hotel naming rights were passed on to the Travelodge group.

In 2015, Plimmer Tower was sold by its Australian owners to a Singaporean private investor. The freehold 34-level tower and car park was sold on behalf of Australian owners Toga NZ No 1 Ltd and Core 3B Plimmer Complex.

The tower is believed to have sold for about $24m and the adjoining 642-bay parking building has been sold separately for about $16m to Penrith Holdings, a company operated by local property investor and developer Paul Benjamin. The sale did not include the Travelodge Hotel, which is part of the complex.

The building is constructed on a sloping hillside, so the Lambton Quay side of the office building is 106m above street level rather than the 84m on the other side of the tower.

In 2022 the Travelodge was advertised for sale.

== See also ==
- List of tallest structures in New Zealand
