= Aon Center =

The Aon Center is the name of three buildings.

- Aon Center (Chicago)
- Aon Center (Los Angeles)
- Aon Centre (Wellington)
