= 157 Lambton Quay =

Building on Lambton Quay, Wellington

NTT Tower
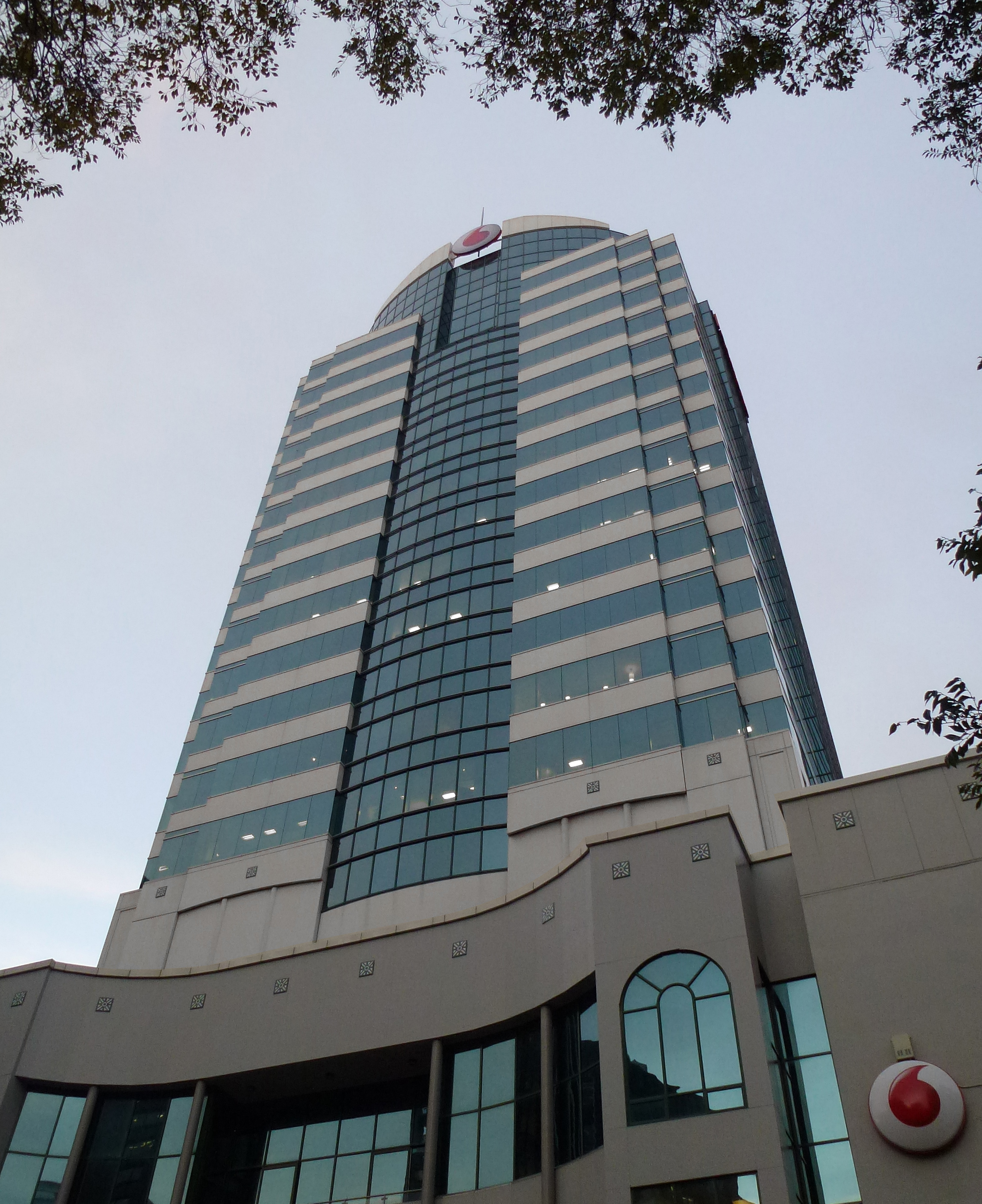
- NTT Tower at 157 Lambton Quay, pictured with its former Vodafone branding
- Interactive map of the NTT Tower area
- Former names: Mobil on The Park / Vodafone on The Park / Dimension Data Tower

General information
- Type: Office
- Architectural style: Modernism
- Location: 157 Lambton Quay, Wellington, New Zealand
- Coordinates: 41.28242°S 174.77733°E
- Construction started: 1990-1993
- Completed: 1999

Height
- Height: 93 metres (305 ft)

Technical details
- Floor count: 25

Design and construction
- Architect: Peddle Thorp & Montgomery
- Main contractor: Mainzeal Property and Construction

157 Lambton Quay, currently known as NTT Tower (formerly Dimension Data Tower, 'Vodafone on The Quay' and 'Mobil on The Park') was designed by Peddle Thorp & Montgomery Architects and was completed in 1999. The main architect on the build was Robert Montgomery and the building was built by Mainzeal Construction. The building was engineered by Connell Wagner Structural Engineers, (now Aurecon).

NTT Tower comprises two parts, a modernist high-rise building constructed of concrete with exterior façades of blue glass and the refurbished and strengthened old Police Station buildings that flank the tower. Carparking takes up the lower tower floors to about the height of the old buildings, with office space above that.

The building stands at 93 metres high and has twenty five stories above the ground, making it the fourth tallest building in Wellington and the twenty fifth tallest building in New Zealand . The floor size is estimated at 28,000 square metres (300,000 sq ft). The construction was valued at $45 million.

The building is owned by Precinct Properties and was renamed to Dimension Data Tower in March 2017. With the global name change of Dimension Data to NTT in 2019, the building's name and branding changed yet again. Tenants of the building have typically included technology companies, including Wellington offices of Microsoft, Google, and Vodafone, as well as aligned startup companies, giving the area a reputation as the city's technological centre.

== Associated Companies ==
- Amazon Web Services
- Provoke Solutions Limited
- The Group Limited
- SuiteFiles
- Fonterra
- Microsoft NZ
- Parker & Associates
- Swan Legal Limited
- Baldwins Intellectual Property
- SAP New Zealand Limited
- VMware Inc.
- FMG
- Forsyth Barr Leveraged Equities Assignment
- Tourism New Zealand
- Rabobank
- Russell McVeagh
