= Lambton Quay =

Street in Wellington, New Zealand

Coordinates: 41.281615°S 174.776043°E

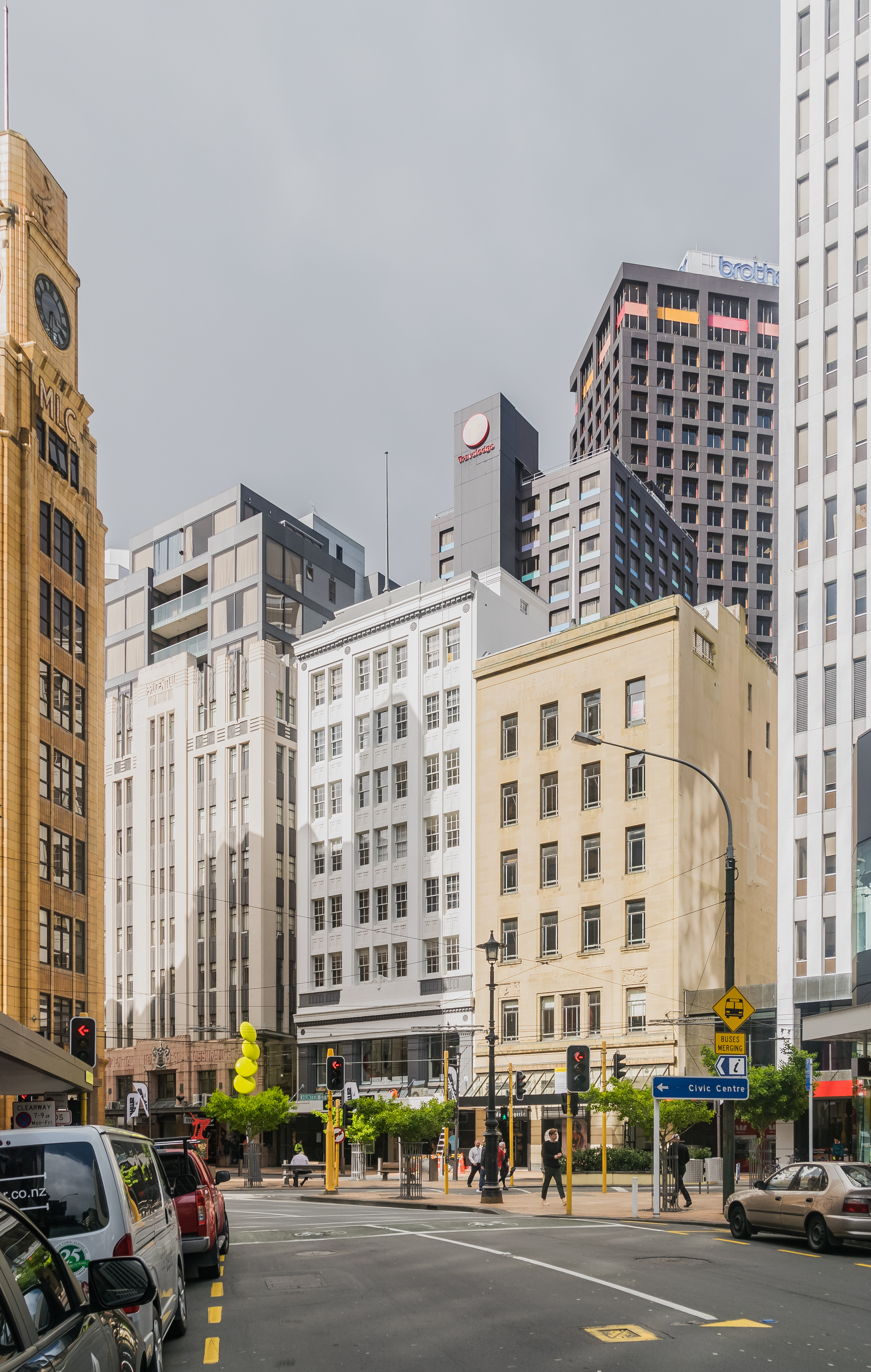
- Buildings at Lambton Quay, viewed from Featherston Street in 2017
- Interactive map of Lambton Quay
- Maintained by: Wellington City Council
- Location: Wellington, New Zealand
- Postal code: 6011
- North end: Featherston Street/Mulgrave Street/Thorndon Quay
- South end: Customhouse Quay/Willeston Street/Willis Street

Lambton Quay (once known as The Beach) is the heart of the central business district of Wellington, the capital city of New Zealand. It is also of administrative significance, with the New Zealand Parliament Buildings towards the northern end. The Wellington Cenotaph is also located at the north end of the street, next to Parliament.

== Toponymy ==
Lambton Quay is named after John Lambton, 1st Earl of Durham, the first chairman of directors of the New Zealand Company. Lambton Quay was the site of the original European settlement in 1840 (following initial settlement on flood-prone land at Petone), which grew into Wellington. The first European settlers referred to the narrow strip of land along the shore as 'The beach', but the name Lambton Quay was in use by the end of 1840.

== Setting ==
Originally, as the name implies, Lambton Quay was on the high-water line of the harbour. Dense bush covered much of the area down to the harbour's edge, and at high tide it could be difficult to get round the rocks at Windy Point (also known as Clay Point, now the intersection of Lambton Quay and Willis Street). The point was dug away between 1857 and 1863 to reclaim almost 8 acres (3.2 ha). Development began along the foreshore of Lambton Quay and Willis Street, with buildings on the landward side and many small wharves on the seaward side. Above Lambton Quay is The Terrace, a street developed on a terrace on the bluff behind Lambton Quay. Kumototo Stream used to flow from the Terrace, down what is now Woodward Street and across Lambton Quay to the waterfront. This stream was culverted in the late 19th century.

=== Reclamation ===
Beginning with the road widening and reclamation at Windy Point, more land was reclaimed along Lambton Quay in the 19th century, enabling building along the east side of the street. Land uplift caused by the 1855 Wairarapa earthquake and further reclamation have left Lambton Quay some 250 metres from the current shoreline.

== History ==
=== 19th century ===
In the mid-19th century Kumutoto kainga (village) was sited on the Terrace near the Kumutoto Stream, and Pipitea Pā was at the extreme northern end of Lambton Quay (the section of road in this area is now known as Thorndon Quay). On 22 October 1840 Barrett's Hotel, a two-storeyed public house, opened at the north end of the quay, and by 1866 there were 33 hotels along Lambton Quay. Other businesses and public buildings were built along the foreshore of Lambton Quay, and it became the business heart and main street of the new settlement.

Large earthquakes in 1848 and 1855 damaged newly built brick buildings and caused small tsunami which flooded many of the buildings along the quay. The Wellington Hotel had been opened at the north end of Lambton Quay by 1843 and later extended. It was a brick two-storey building described by a visitor in 1853 as "the most pretentious building we have yet seen in New Zealand". Its owner, Baron Alzdorf, was the only Wellingtonian killed in the 1855 earthquake, when a chimney of the hotel fell on him. After this the hotel became the Criterion Hotel, a name it kept until at least 1887. The 1855 Wairarapa earthquake also uplifted land along Lambton Quay.

John Plimmer, known as "the father of Wellington", was a plasterer and builder who worked in the timber trade after demand for masonry buildings fell following the 1848 earthquake. He had a timber yard and a house above Lambton Quay reached by what is now called Plimmer Steps. In 1850 Plimmer bought the Inconstant, a ship which had foundered while entering Wellington Harbour. He towed the hulk to the foreshore at the southern end of Lambton Quay, added a roof to the hull and used the old ship as a building and jetty which was accessed via a small bridge from Lambton Quay. The ship became known as 'Plimmer's Ark'. The ship tipped over in the 1855 earthquake. Although it was righted, the water level around the ship had become too shallow for ships to dock at its jetty. As land was reclaimed, the ship became landlocked. In 1883 it was demolished and buildings built on top of the site near the corner of Lambton Quay and Willis Street, which is now known as the Old Bank Arcade. Remnants of the hull were uncovered in 1997.

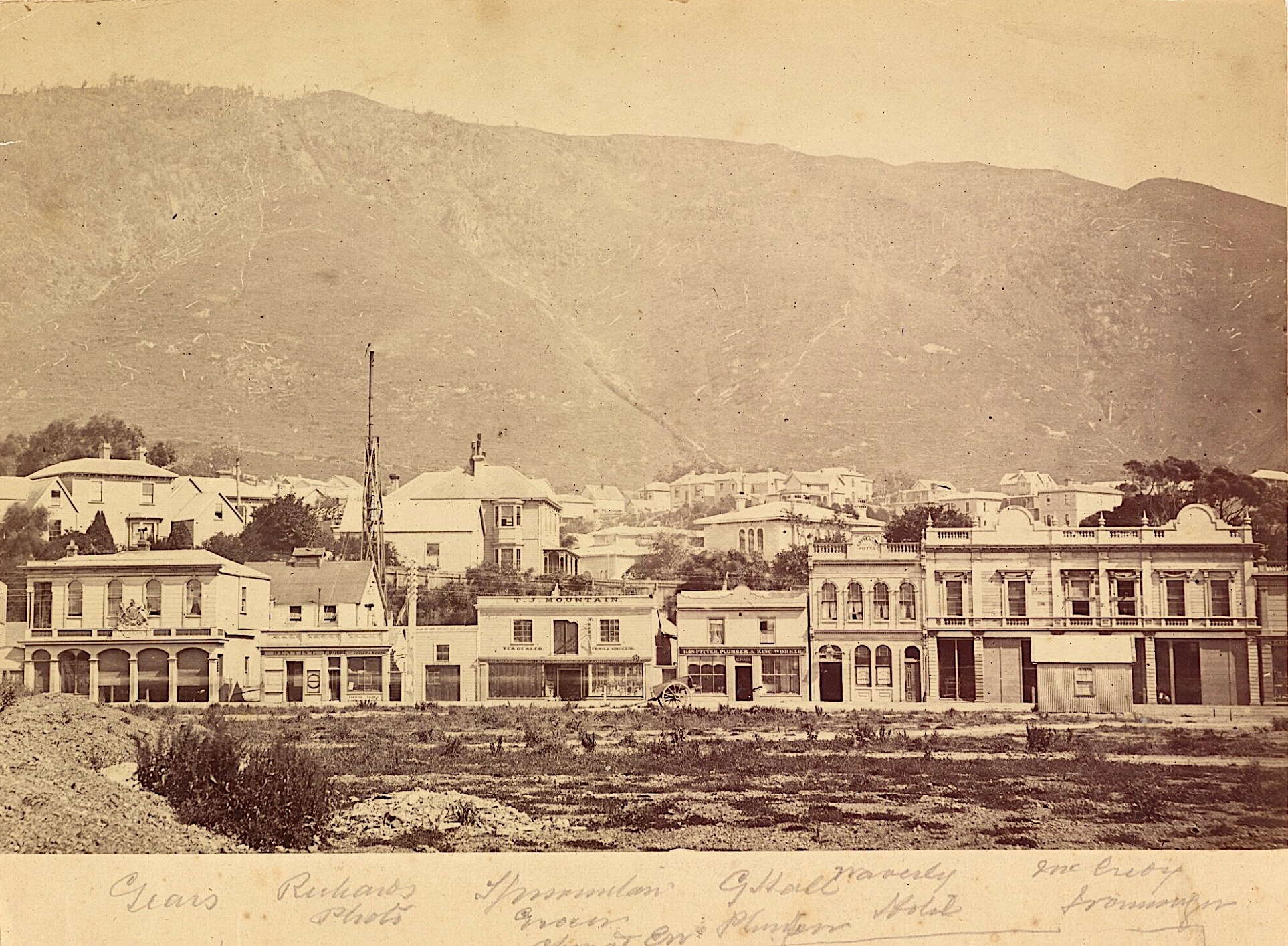
Lambton Quay about 1880 showing the reclamation, T. Mountain's store at 80 Lambton Quay, Cutler & Moore piano shop, James Gear's butchery and the Criterion Hotel (rebuilt after the 1855 earthquake damaged the Wellington Hotel)

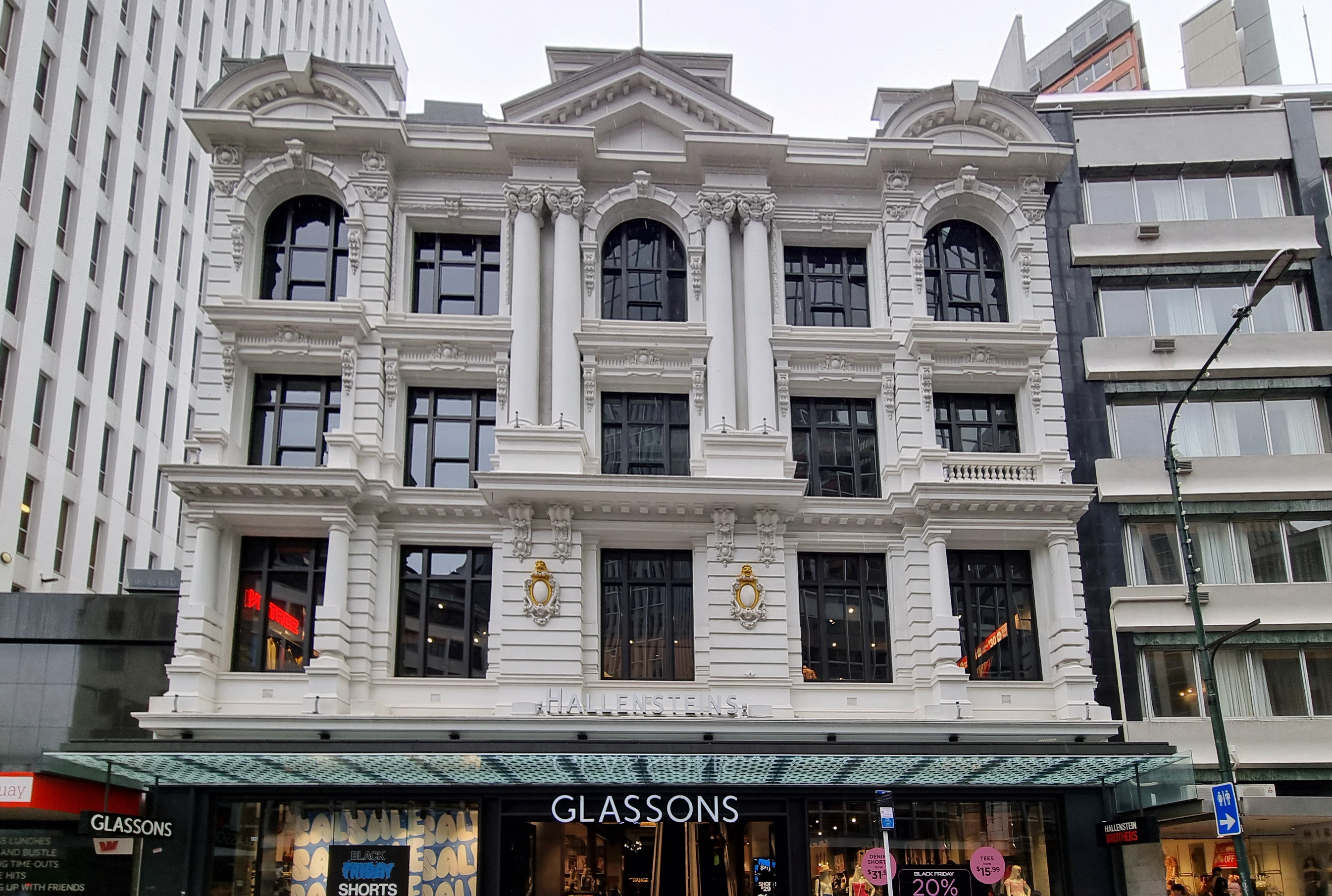
Whitcoulls Building at 312-316 Lambton Quay, built 1907

Buildings were erected in wood for a time after the 1855 earthquake but this presented a fire risk. In 1877 Wellington City Council ruled that in a specified central city area that included Lambton Quay, all new buildings had to be clad in incombustible materials. By 1900 many substantial buildings had been built on both sides of Lambton Quay: shops including Kirkcaldie & Stains, hotels, banks, insurance companies, the central police station, the government printer and Government Buildings.

Wellington introduced electric street lighting in 1889, becoming the first city in New Zealand to do so. A lamp post commemorating the introduction of electric lighting to the city stands at the intersection of Featherston Street and Lambton Quay.

=== Early twentieth century ===
Although 1877 regulations specified that new buildings should be fire-resistant, many older wooden buildings remained on Lambton Quay. In 1906 a large fire destroyed 18 buildings on both sides of Lambton Quay between Grey Street and Hunter Street. One of the new buildings built after the fire was the former Whitcoulls Building, built in 1907, which has since been gutted and rebuilt with the façade retained. The five-storey Public Trust Building at 131 Lambton Quay, opened in 1909, was said to be the first large public building in New Zealand with an earthquake-resistant skeleton-rivetted steel frame.

The two-storey Kirkcaldie and Stains building on Lambton Quay was built in three stages: the central part was built in 1897, and the two end sections were built in 1908–1910. During 1927–1928 the central section was remodelled to match the façades of the two end sections.

The Wellington Cable Car running from Lambton Quay to the top of the Botanic Garden was opened in 1902.

=== 1920s–1930s ===
Wellington City Council had set a maximum height limit for buildings of 102 feet (about nine storeys) in 1908, but it was not until the 1920s that tall buildings became more common in Wellington. New, taller, steel-framed buildings were less prone to damage in earthquakes, and new technology such as electric power, lifts, central heating, telephones and fire-fighting equipment could be incorporated into new builds. The first building over 100 ft high on Lambton Quay was Druids Chambers, completed in 1923. This was followed in 1926 by the Australian Temperance and General Mutual Life Assurance Society Building (also known as the Harcourts Building), a nine-storey building at 203-213 Lambton Quay with a steel frame and reinforced concrete floors. This building was converted to become a DoubleTree Hilton hotel in 2018. The D.I.C. (now Harbour City) building was built in 1928, followed by the Prudential Insurance Building in 1933. The Prudential Building was constructed on a site previously occupied by the 1877 Athenaeum and Mechanics Institute, a major landmark on Lambton Quay in its time. The Great Depression in the 1930s and World War 2 stalled further building along the street.

=== 1970s ===
An earthquake on 1 November 1968 caused minor damage to many central city buildings. Surveys of the earthquake damage and general condition of over 400 buildings were made by government agencies and Wellington City Council, leading to categorisation of city buildings into three groups: those that should be demolished, those needing further examination, and those which could remain. In 1970 there was a variety of buildings on the west side of Lambton Quay, mostly two or three storeys high and dating from the early 20th century. Many had been designed in late Victorian or Edwardian Classical style by prominent architects and housed shops, hotels, banks and offices. As a result of the earthquake surveys, changes in planning rules, a desire for modernisation, and demand for greater return on property investment, 69 of these older buildings that existed in 1970 were demolished during the 1970s and early 1980s and replaced with 18 much larger office blocks, dramatically changing the character of Lambton Quay.

=== Later development ===
In 1984 the government deregulated financial markets. One result of this was that investors spent on new buildings in Wellington, including on Lambton Quay. However deregulation also meant that businesses had less need to have their head offices close to the seat of government, resulting in a shift of large corporate offices to Auckland. The building boom ended with the sharemarket crash in 1987.

Increasing awareness of heritage after the wholesale demolition of the led to some older buildings being strengthened and repurposed rather than being demolished. The 1907 Whitcoulls building was refurbished and strengthened in 1984 and a 15-storey tower block was constructed behind it.

The D.I.C. building, built in 1928, had been strengthened between 1979 and 1981 but after DIC got into financial difficulties the building was sold in the mid-1980s and redeveloped as the Harbour City Centre, which opened in 1985. Independent retailers occupied spaces on the first two floors and the upper floors became offices.

Hamilton Chambers was an eight-storey building constructed in 1928 at 199-201 Lambton Quay. In 2002 it was demolished, but the façade was retained and incorporated into the frontage of the new 25-storey HSBC Tower.

Midland Park was developed on the site of the former Midland Hotel which was built in 1915 and demolished in 1982. The park is popular with office workers at lunchtimes. Behind the park is the NTT Tower (formerly Vodafone on the Park), a high-rise building completed in 1999. The development incorporates parts of the refurbished and strengthened former Central Police Station building which has façades on Waring Taylor and Johnston Streets.

=== Department stores ===
During the 20th century there were several department stores on Lambton Quay. These included the D.I.C. (1891–1984) and Haywrights (opened 1969, later becoming James Smiths and then Farmers). The premiere department store on Lambton Quay was Kirkcaldie and Stains. In 2016 Kirkcaldie and Stains closed and David Jones opened in the building. David Jones closed in 2022. As of 2024, the retail space was divided and occupied by a local brand AS Colour, and two international brands Calvin Klein and Tommy Hilfiger.

== Golden Mile ==
Lambton Quay, Willis Street, Manners Street and Courtenay Place form what is known locally as the 'Golden Mile'. The city's retail trade has spread further south to also include Cuba Street, but Lambton Quay remains a major commercial thoroughfare. In 2020 it was estimated that about 70,000 people travel on Lambton Quay and Willis Street each day, mostly on foot or by bus.

On 11 February 2025, Wellington City Council confirmed that it would begin pedestrianising the Golden Mile between Lambton Quay and Courtenay Place in April 2025. This project would include removing cars, widening footpaths and building cycling lanes in the area. Wellington Chamber of Commerce chief executive Simon Arcus expressed concern that these changes could affect local businesses and emphasised the need for consultation. As of June 2026 no work had begun.

== Sculptures ==
The length of Lambton Quay is punctuated by various sculptures. A bronze statue of John Plimmer and his dog at Plimmer Steps was voted the most popular public artwork in Wellington in 2013. Woman of Words, by Virginia King, a 3.3 metre-high stainless steel statue of author Katherine Mansfield at Midland Park, has words from Mansfield's writings laser-cut into the metal of the work.

Ruaumoko, at the corner of Lambton Quay and Stout Street, is a sculpture by Ralph Hotere and Mary McFarlane. Rūaumoko is the Māori god of earthquakes and volcanoes. The sculpture consists of broken columns and a jumble of letters salvaged from the front of the nearby State Fire Insurance Building when it was demolished, which look like the result of an earthquake.

Whipping the Wind by Paul Hartigan consists of 200 flashing neon tubes on ten panels around the turret of a building housing the Old Bailey pub at the corner of Lambton Quay and Ballance Street. Hartigan's vision was for "a spinning neon merry-go-round concept that mimicked the volatility and unpredictability of weather patterns in Wellington. It is an elemental thing". The work was created in 1988 as part of a Wellington City Council scheme where developers were allowed to add extra floors to new buildings if they included an artwork. Hartigan believes his sculpture is one of the biggest neon works in the world. In the 1990s the sculpture was turned off, but in 2007 it was repaired and had its electrical system upgraded.

Some sculptures along Lambton Quay

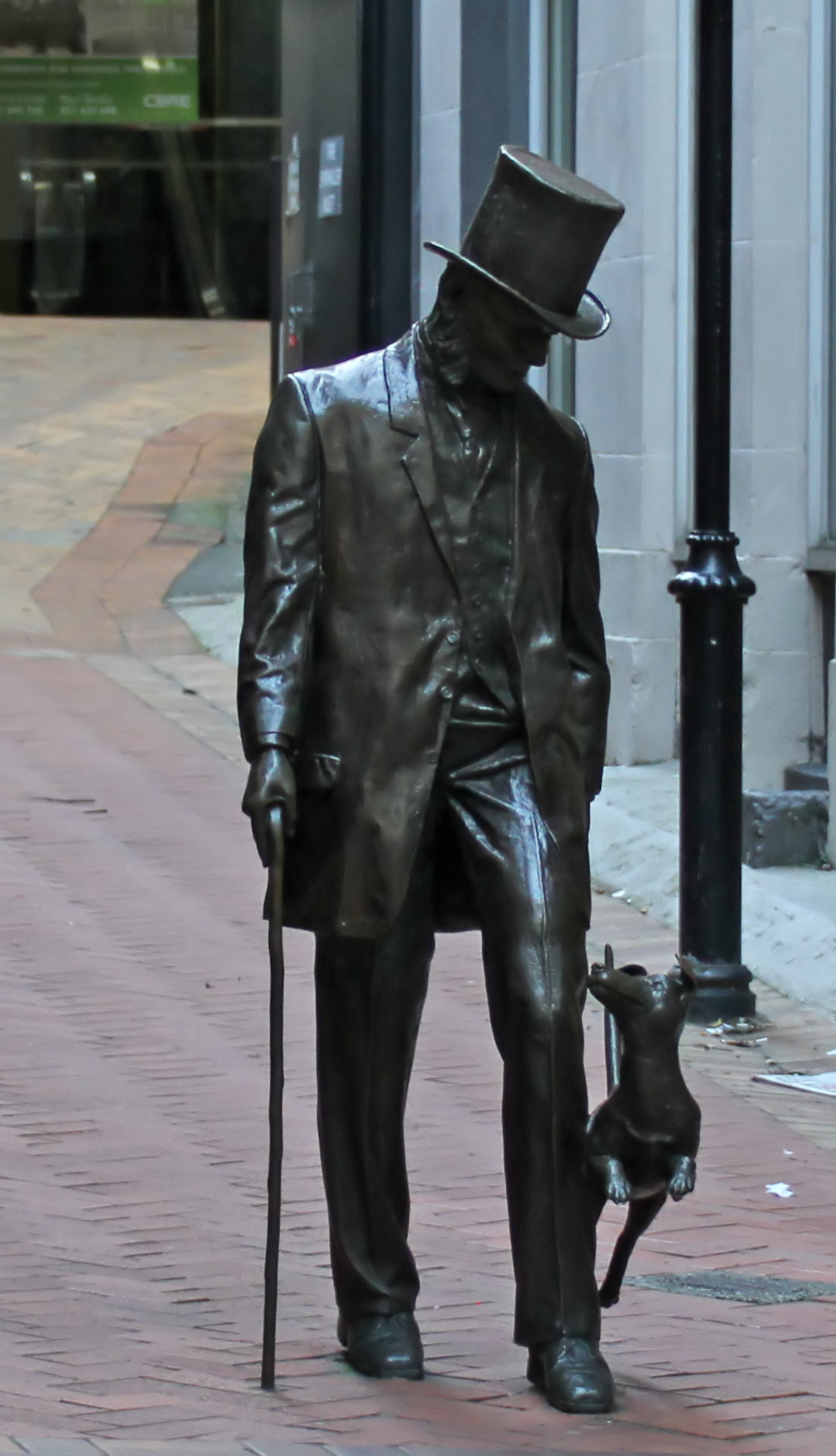
John Plimmer and His Dog Fritz

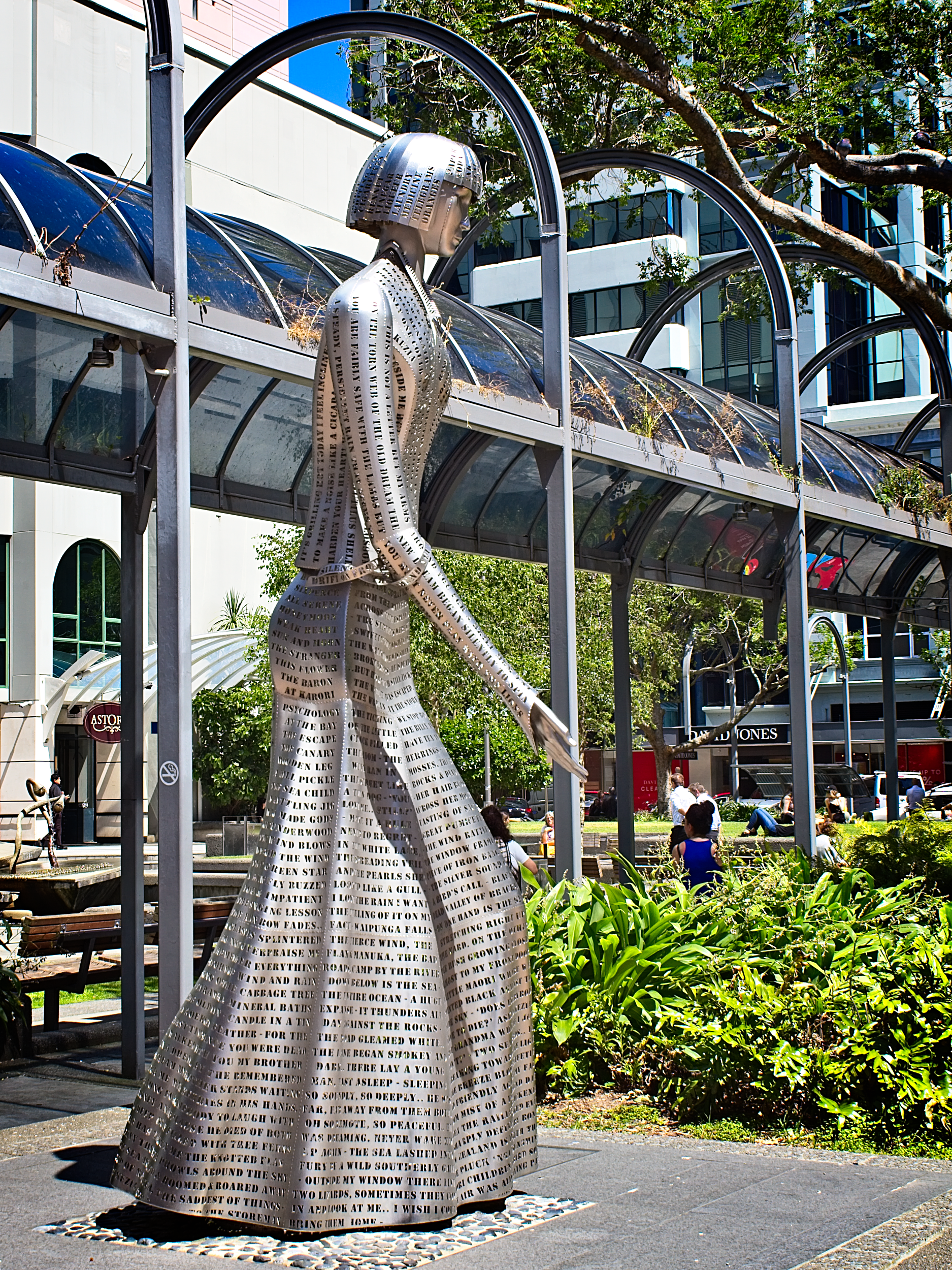
Woman of Words

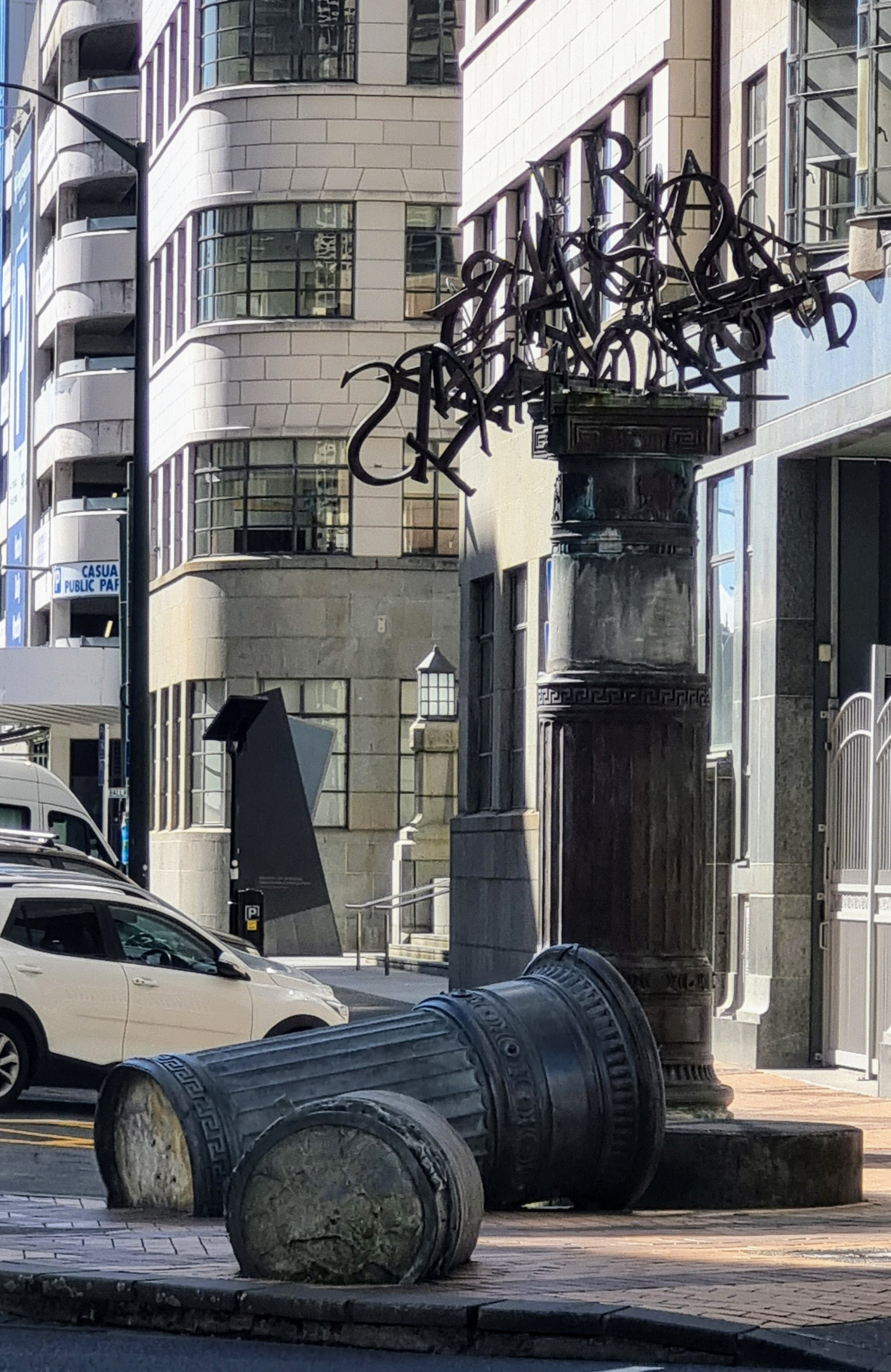
Ruaumoko

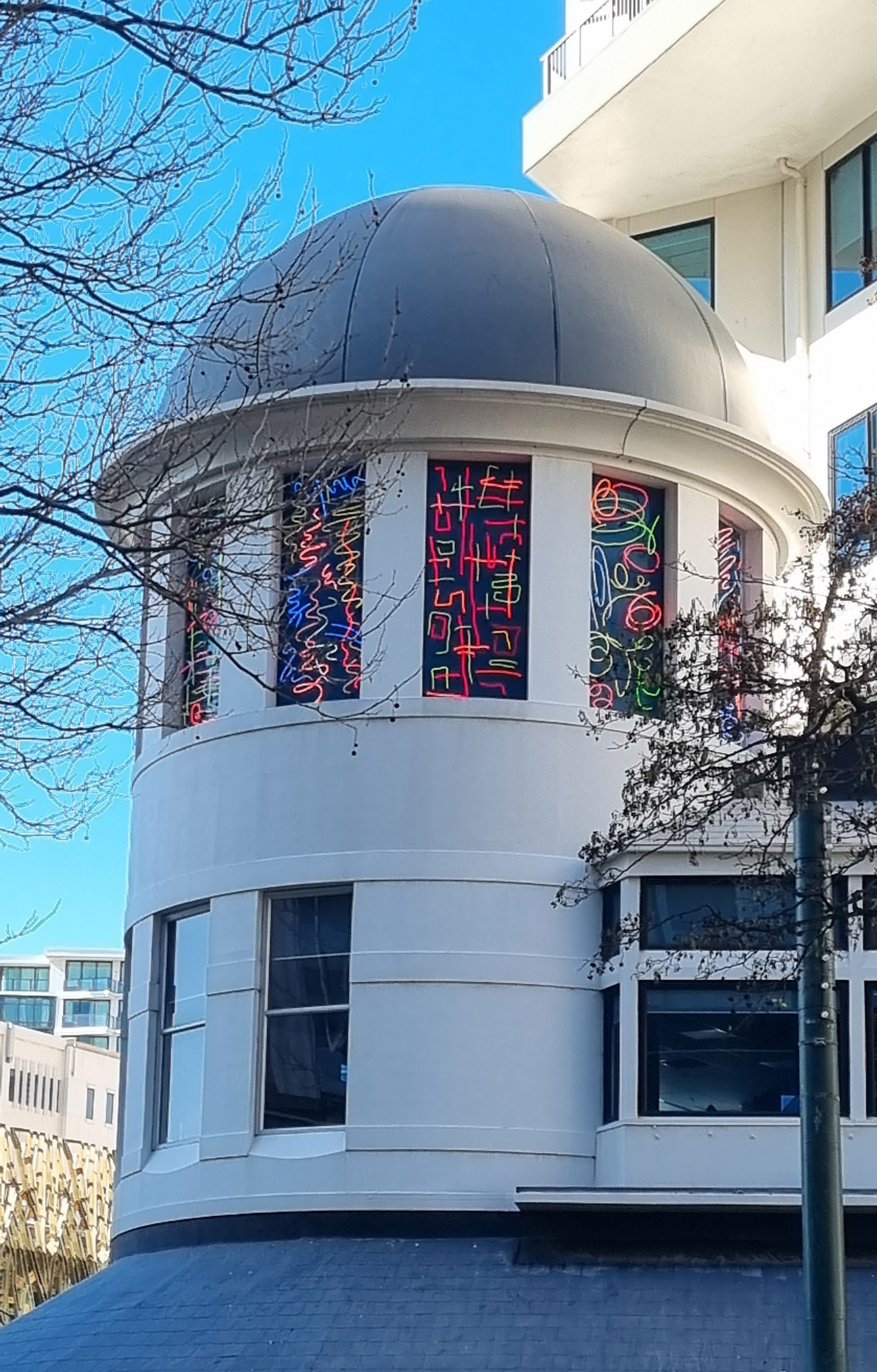
Whipping the Wind

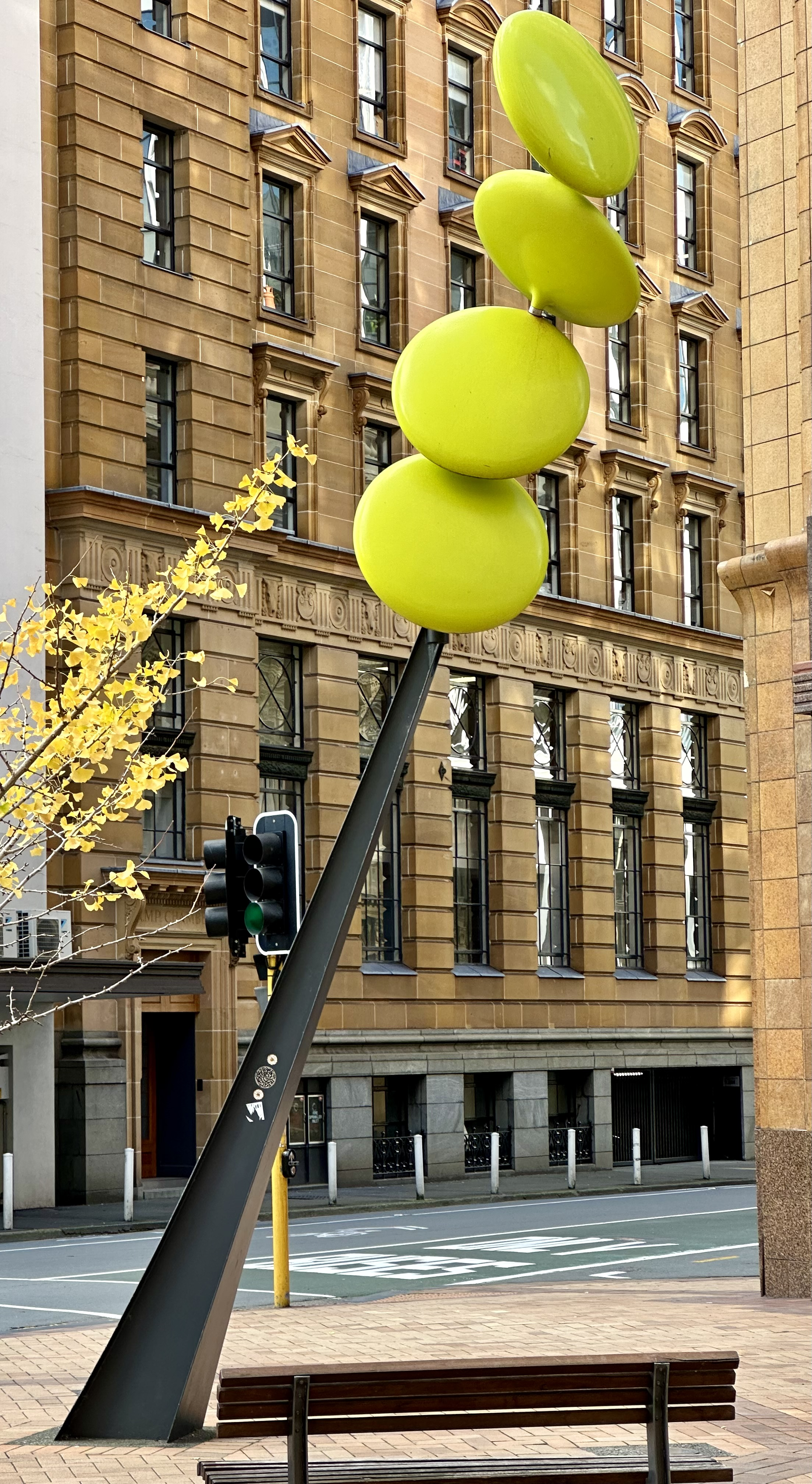
Protoplasm

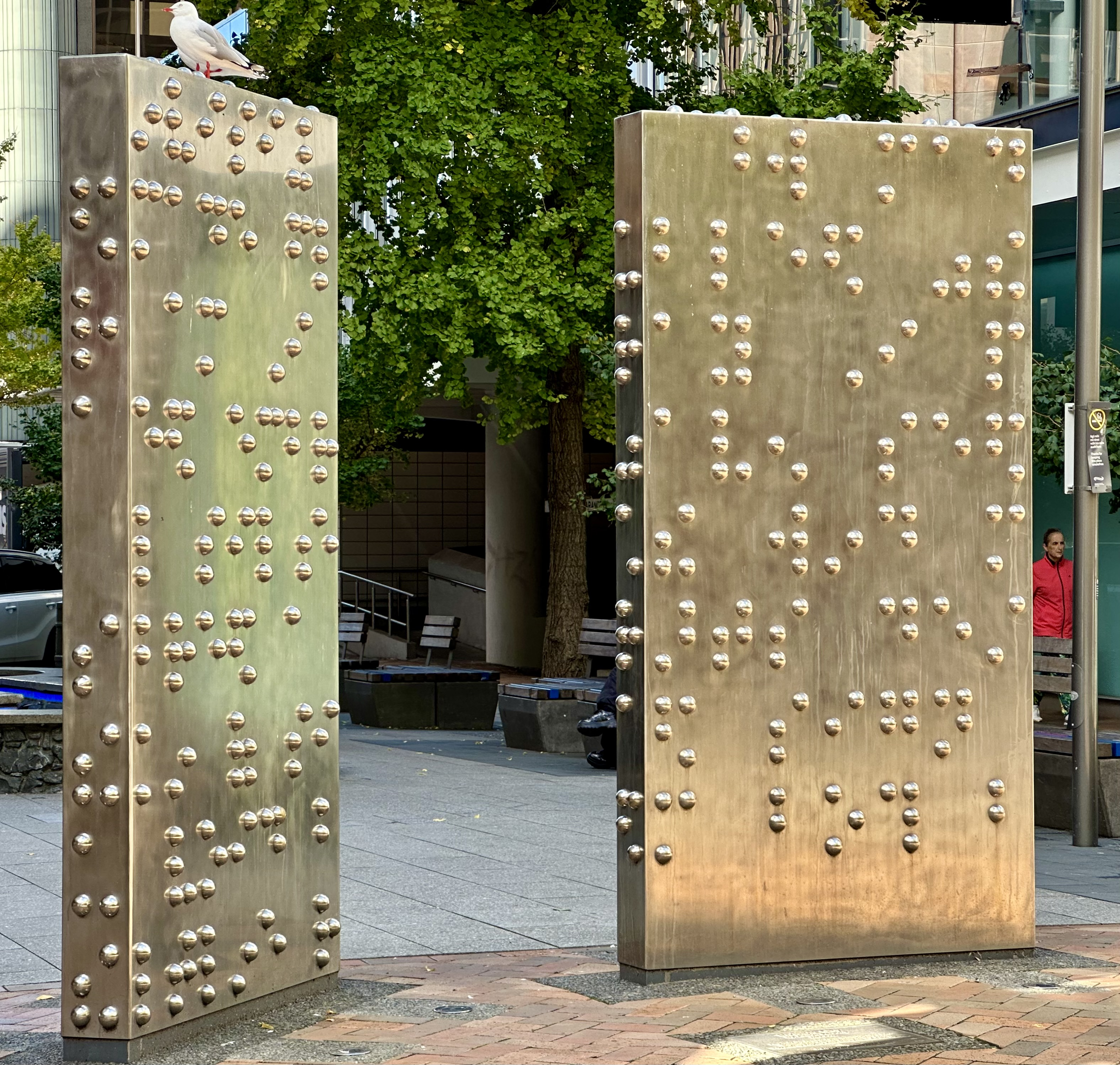
Invisible City

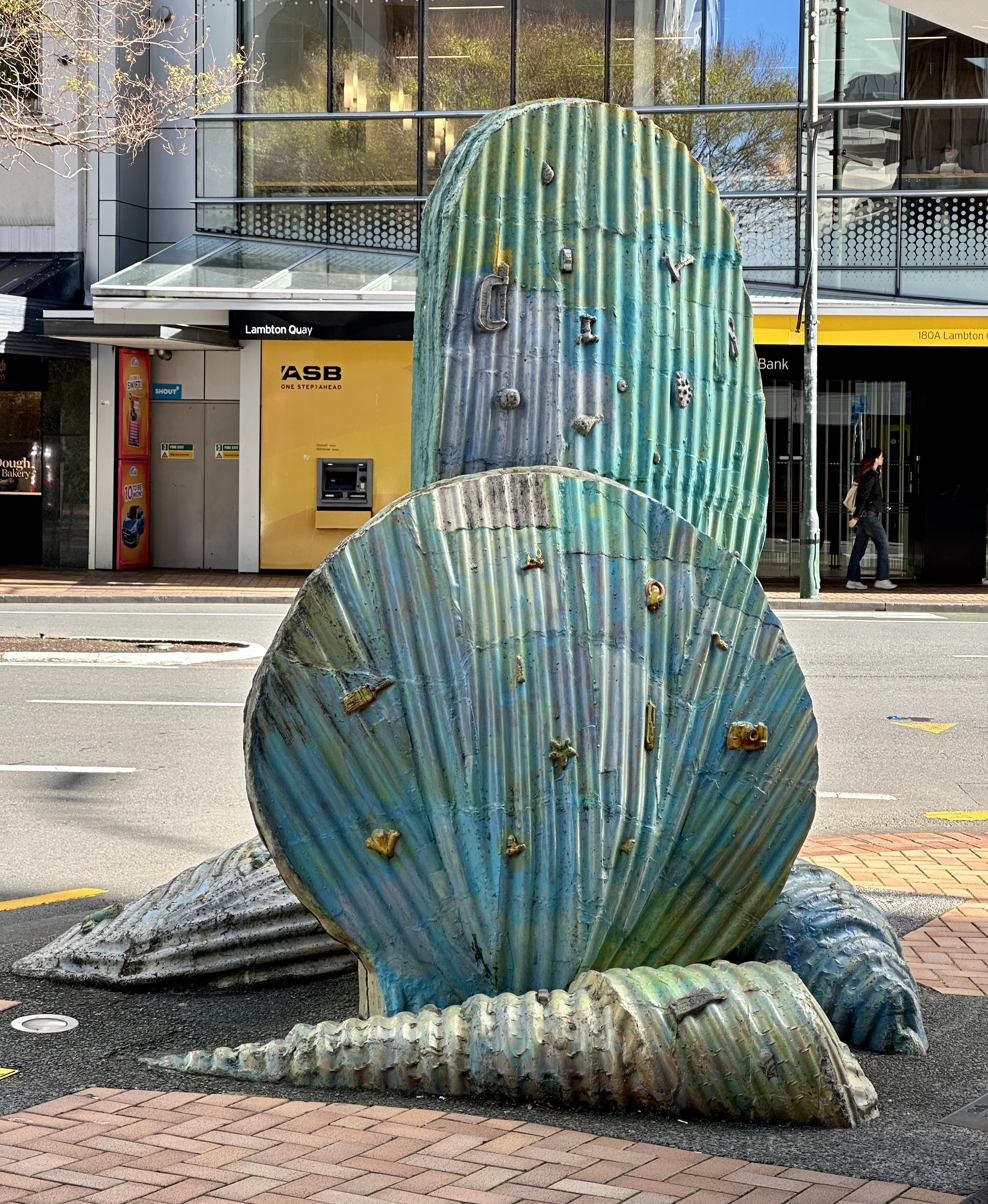
Shells

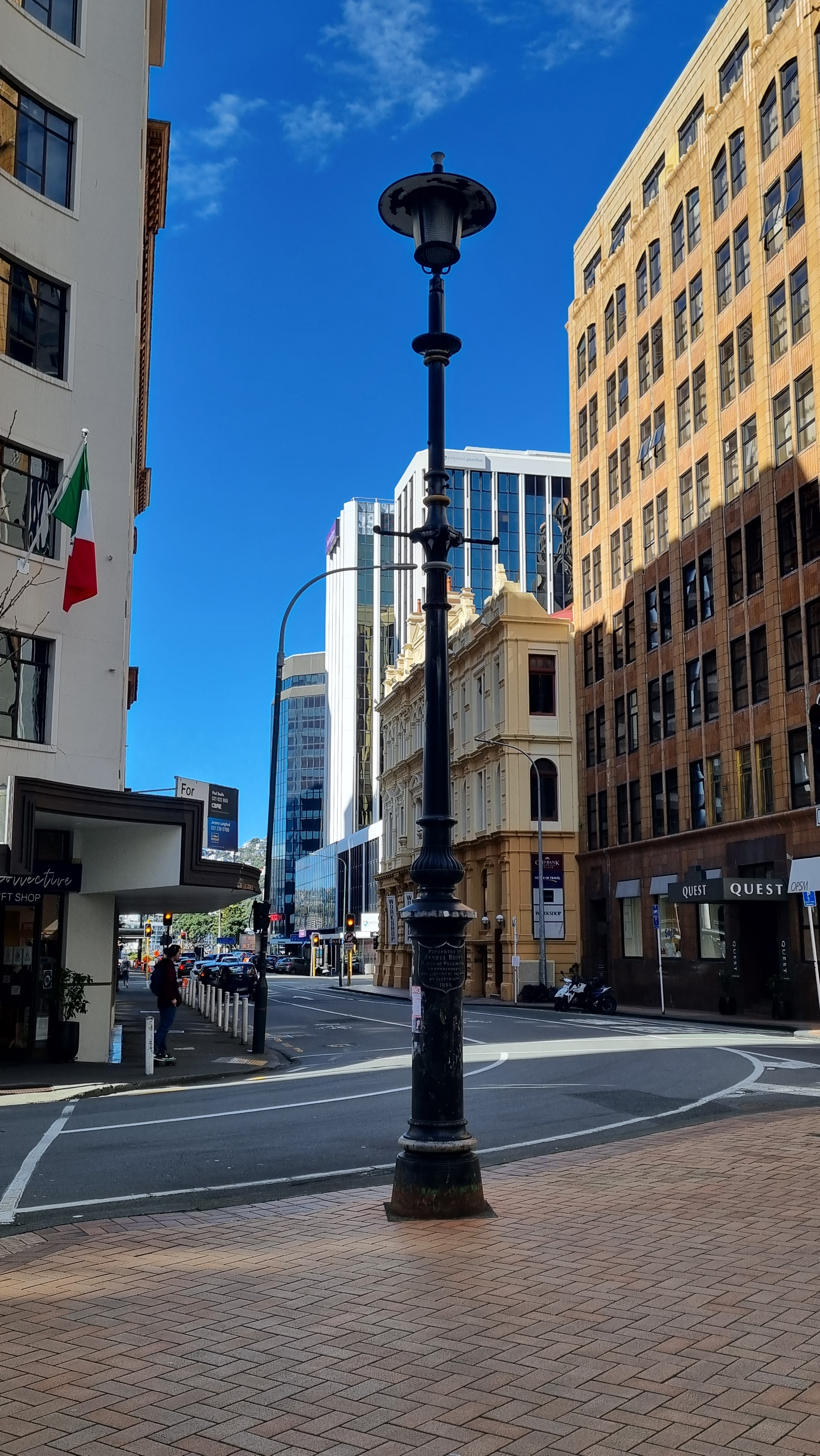
Historic lamp post: 1889 introduction of electric street lighting
