= Willis Street =

Major street in Wellington, New Zealand

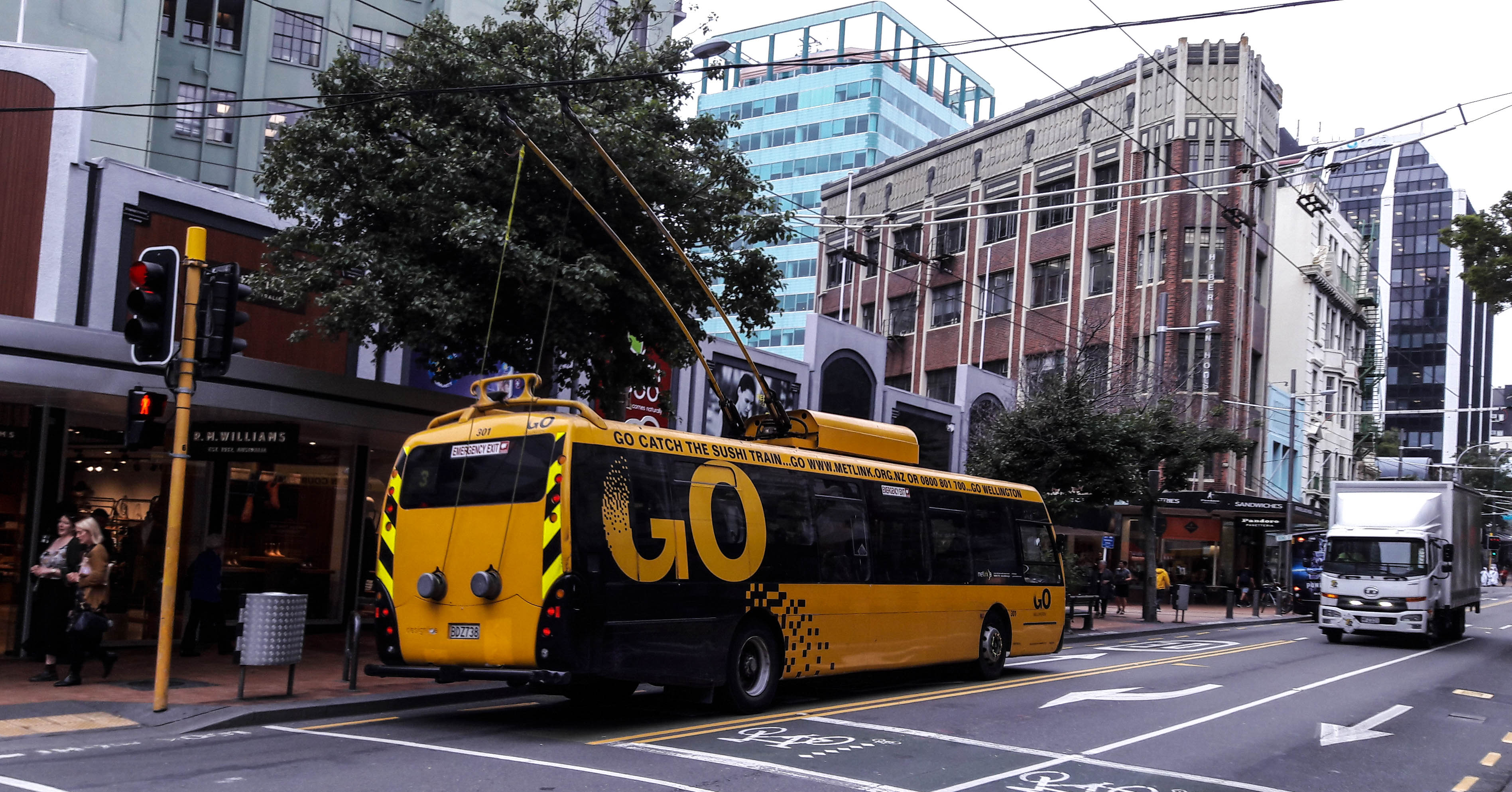
- Willis Street, looking south from its intersection with Mercer Street
- Interactive map of Willis Street
- Namesake: Arthur Willis, New Zealand Company director.
- Maintained by: Wellington City Council
- Length: 1.3 km (0.81 mi)
- Location: 41.288616°S 174.775014°E
- North end: Customhouse Quay, Lambton Quay, Willeston Street
- South end: Brooklyn Road, Nairn Street

Crowd on intersection of Willis and Mercer Streets, Wellington, outside the offices of the Evening Post, awaiting the results of the 1931 general election.

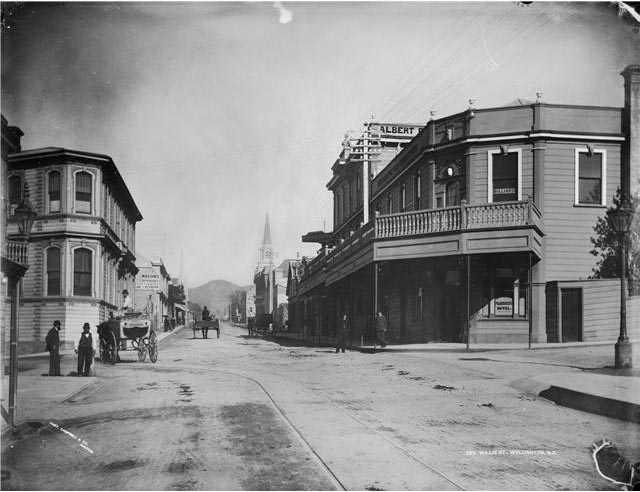
A view of Willis Street from 1883

Willis Street is a prominent street in the central business district of Wellington, the capital city of New Zealand. Along with Courtenay Place, Manners Street and Lambton Quay, the lower reaches of Willis Street form part of the "Golden Mile", Wellington's primary entertainment and retail district.

Willis Street is one of the four 'quarters' of downtown Wellington, the others being centred on the Cuba Quarter, Courtenay Place and Lambton Quay.

The two tallest buildings in Wellington, the Aon Centre (formerly known as BNZ Tower) and the Majestic Centre, are both located on Willis Street. There is a large number of heritage buildings registered by Heritage New Zealand in Willis Street, including St John's Church and Henry Pollen House.
