= Majestic Centre =

High rise office building in Wellington, New Zealand

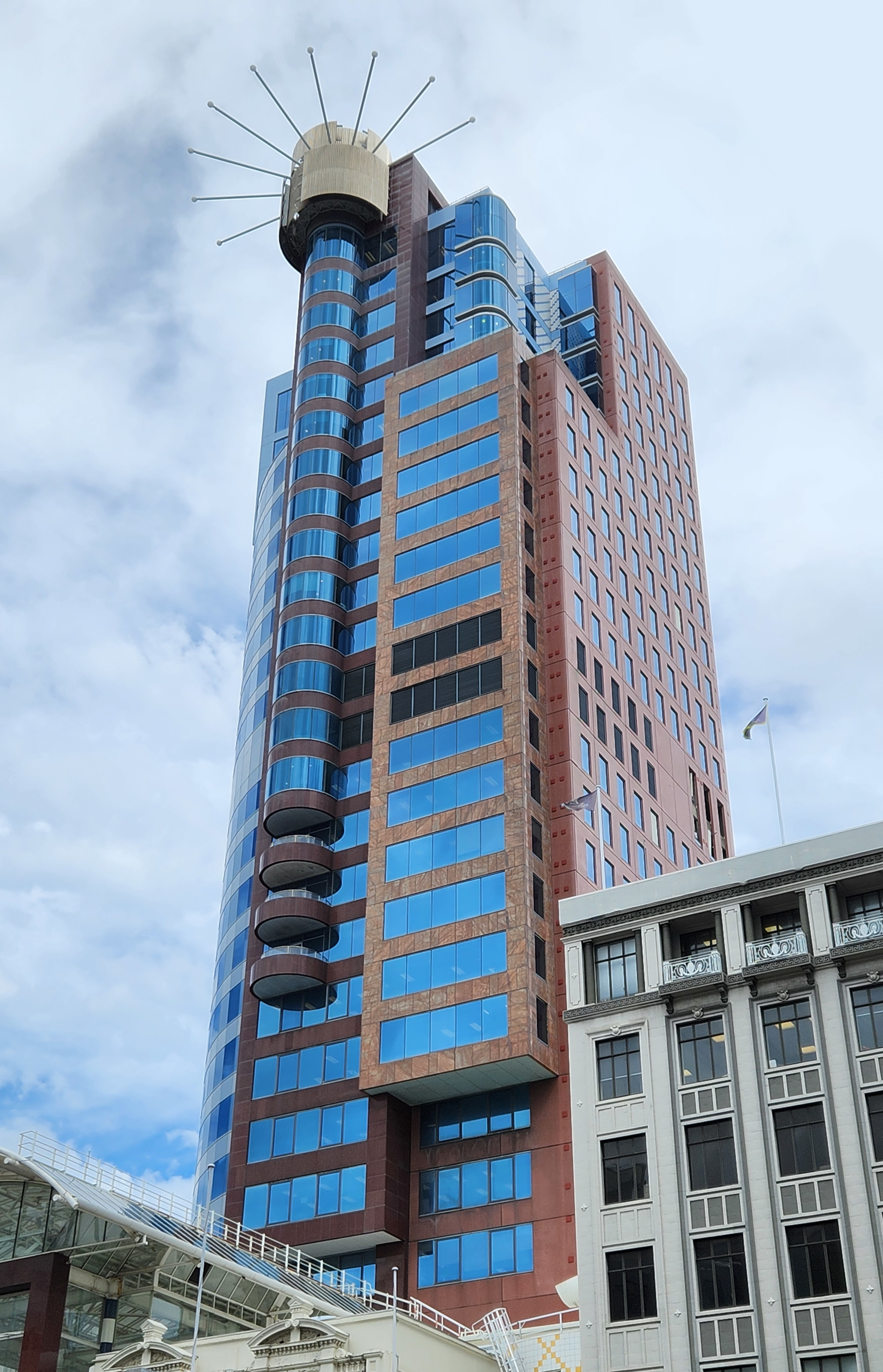
- Majestic Tower at 100 Willis Street

General information
- Type: Office
- Architectural style: Post-Modernism
- Location: 100 Willis Street, Wellington, New Zealand
- Coordinates: 41°17′18.13″S 174°46′28.09″E
- Construction started: 1987
- Completed: 1991
- Owner: Kiwi Income Properties Trust; Primaq Holdings (former)

Height
- Height: 116 metres (381 ft)

Technical details
- Floor count: 29

Design and construction
- Architect: Jack Manning/Jasmax
- Structural engineer: Holmes Consulting Group
- Services engineer: Norman Disney & Young
- Main contractor: Mainzeal Property and Construction

The Majestic Centre is an office building complex in Te Aro, Wellington, New Zealand, consisting of the 29-storey, 116-metre (381ft) tall Majestic Tower and some smaller adjacent buildings. It is the tallest building in Wellington and the 19th-tallest structure in New Zealand. As of 2016 it was the southernmost skyscraper in the world taller than 100 metres.

== Construction and tenants ==
The Majestic Centre was designed by Jack Manning of Manning Mitchell in association with Kendon McGrail of Jasmax Architects. Construction began in 1987 and was completed in 1991. At the time of its completion, it was one of the three tallest buildings in New Zealand, the two other contenders (ANZ Centre and ASB Tower in Auckland) being built in the same year. It is mainly used as office space.

The curved shape of the Majestic Centre's tower was determined by wind parameters set by Wellington City Council, aimed at reducing wind gusts at street level and around buildings. The Willis Street entrance to the building consists of a three-storey high atrium with a glass roof, reputedly the biggest in the southern hemisphere at the time of construction. The exterior of the tower is clad in bands of blue glass and alucobond on the curved area, with precast reconstituted granite concrete panels and a red granite used on other parts of the tower. A crystallized glass called Neo-Paries, a granite alternative, was used inside the foyer. At the top of the tower is a crown of lights on poles.

== History ==
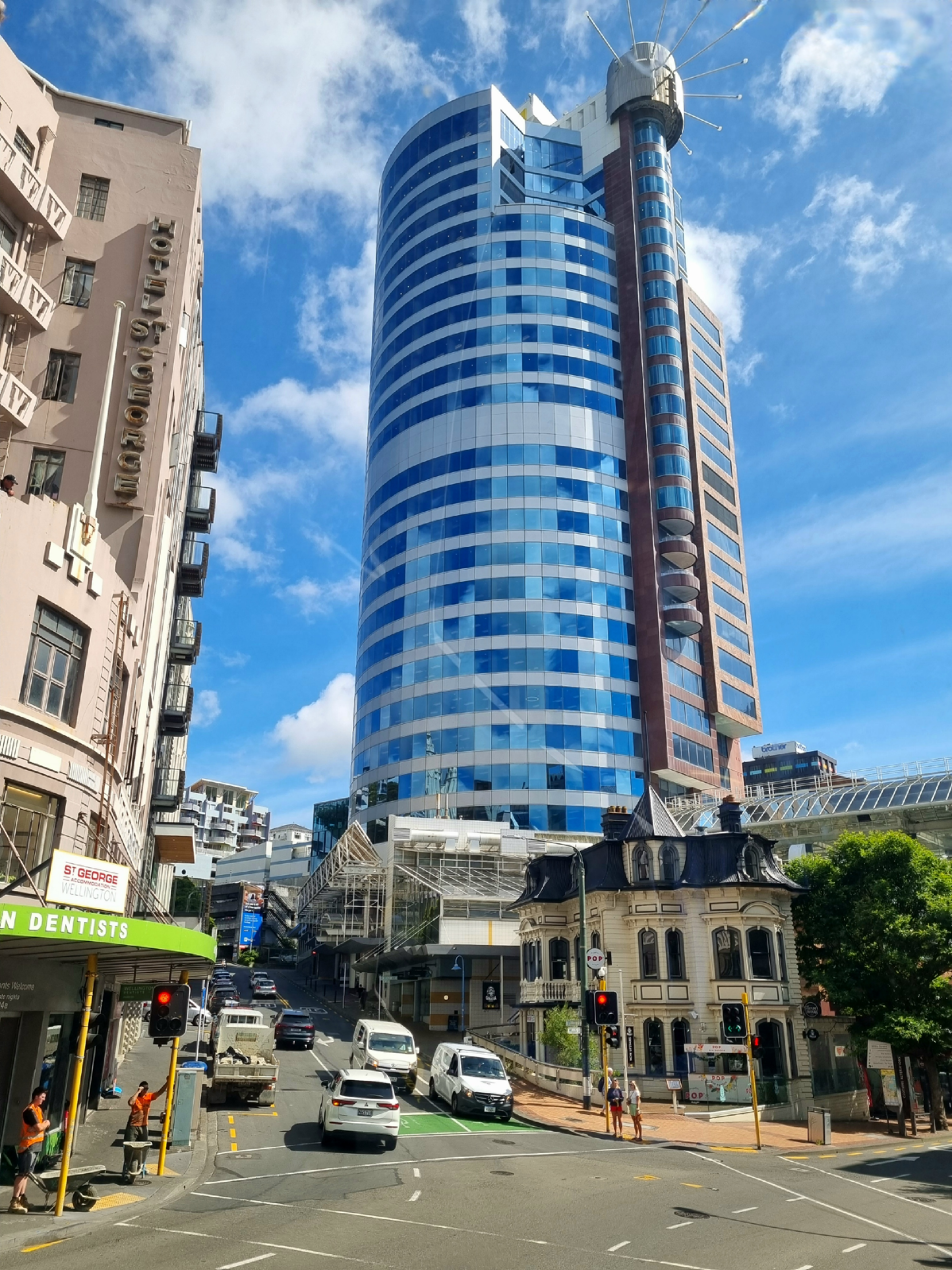
The Majestic Centre and Henry Pollen House, on the corner of Boulcott Street and Willis Street

The site was originally occupied by the Majestic Theatre, also used as a cinema and cabaret, which operated from 1929 to 1984. The cabaret was a key venue for ballroom events in Wellington. By the time of its closure in 1984, the cabaret was deemed to be an earthquake risk, and demolition began in 1987 to make way for its namesake high-rise building. Dr Henry Pollen's House (aka House of Ladies) had to be saved as a condition of using the site. This building was moved from its original site at 12 Boulcott St down to the corner of Boulcott and Willis Streets. The Willis Street frontage of the Majestic Centre also incorporates the three-storey Edwardian Classical brick façade of Preston's Building, which was constructed in the early 1900s.

As of 2014, Ernst & Young New Zealand was the anchor tenant, with naming rights to the building. Other tenants include Opus International Consultants Limited, the Japanese Embassy, Chubb Insurance New Zealand Ltd, the Earthquake Commission and Airways Corporation.

Following the 2011 Canterbury earthquake, the Majestic Tower was assessed by engineering consultants to be of moderate earthquake risk, with strengthening costs initially estimated at NZ$35 million, later revised upwards to $83–85 million. The work was completed to 100% earthquake compliance in 2016.

In 2025, refurbishment of the atrium was completed. The original water feature beside the escalators was replaced with a series of large stepped planter boxes featuring native New Zealand plants.

== See also ==
- List of tallest structures in New Zealand
- List of tallest buildings in Wellington
