= Dr Henry Pollen's House =

Historic building in Wellington, New Zealand

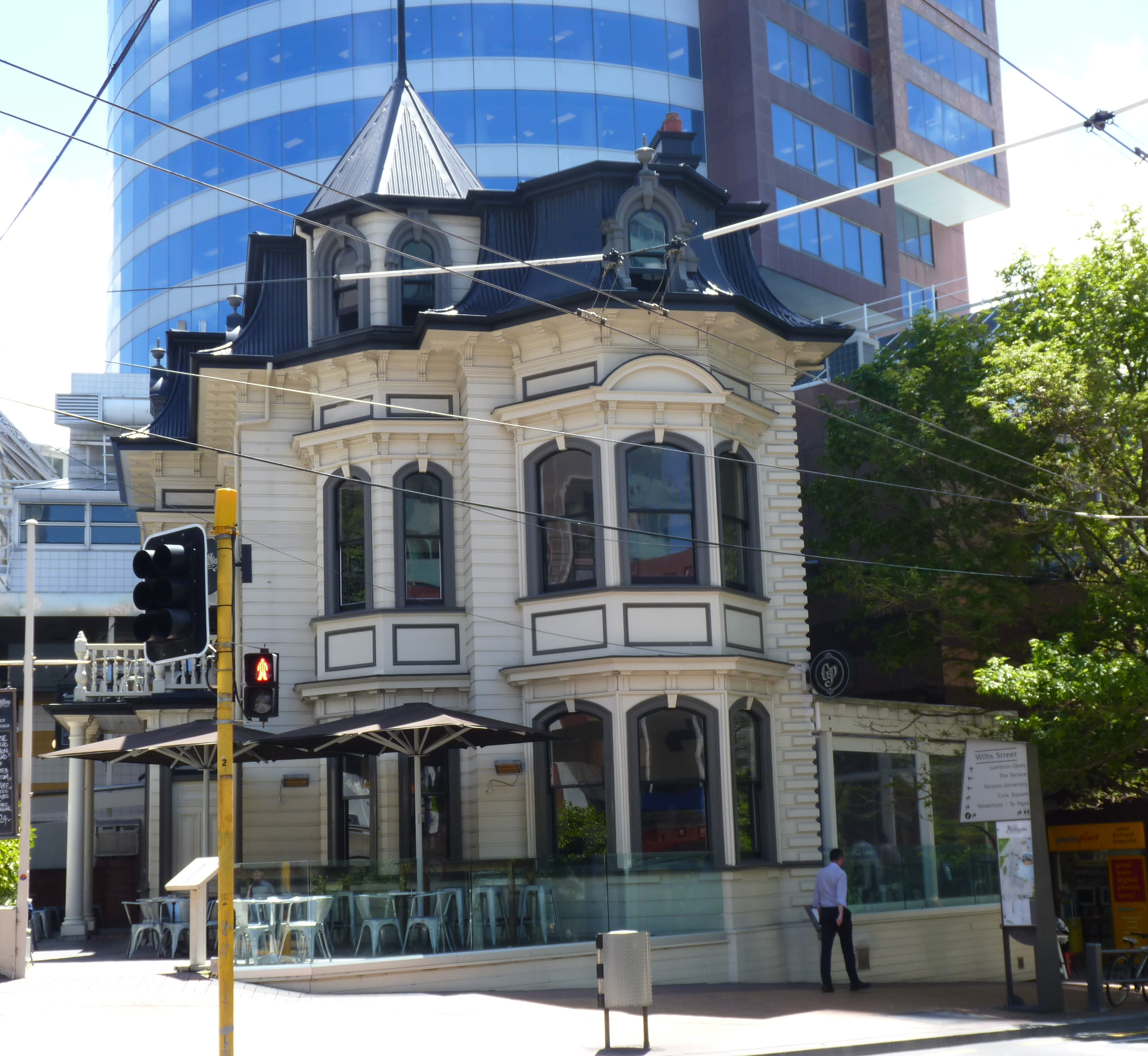
- Interactive map of the Dr Henry Pollen's House area

General information
- Architectural style: Second French Empire architecture/Edwardian
- Location: 100 Willis St, Wellington, New Zealand
- Coordinates: 41.28684°S 174.77382°E
- Completed: 1902

Design and construction
- Architect: William Turnbull

Heritage New Zealand – Category 1
- Designated: 24 November 1989
- Reference no.: 1420

Dr Henry Pollen's House is a Category 1 historic building in Wellington, New Zealand. The house was built in 1902 for Dr Henry Pollen as a residence and surgery. It was designed by William Turnbull. It was originally located at 12 Boulcott Street but was moved by crane to the corner of Boulcott Street and Willis Street in 1988 to make room for the Majestic Centre. The building was also reoriented by about 90 degrees to fit on its new site.

Since Dr Pollen's death in 1918, the building has had a variety of uses including life as a private residence, bookshop, wine bar and restaurant. In the late 1970s and 1980s the building was used as a massage parlour called "The House of Ladies". As of January 2021 the building houses a bar named 'Pop'.

The house is built of totara, matai and rimu with a corrugated iron mansard roof, and when restored after being moved its historical features were retained as much as possible. Original brick chimneys were replaced with lightweight replicas.
