= Kumutoto Stream =

Stream in Wellington, New Zealand

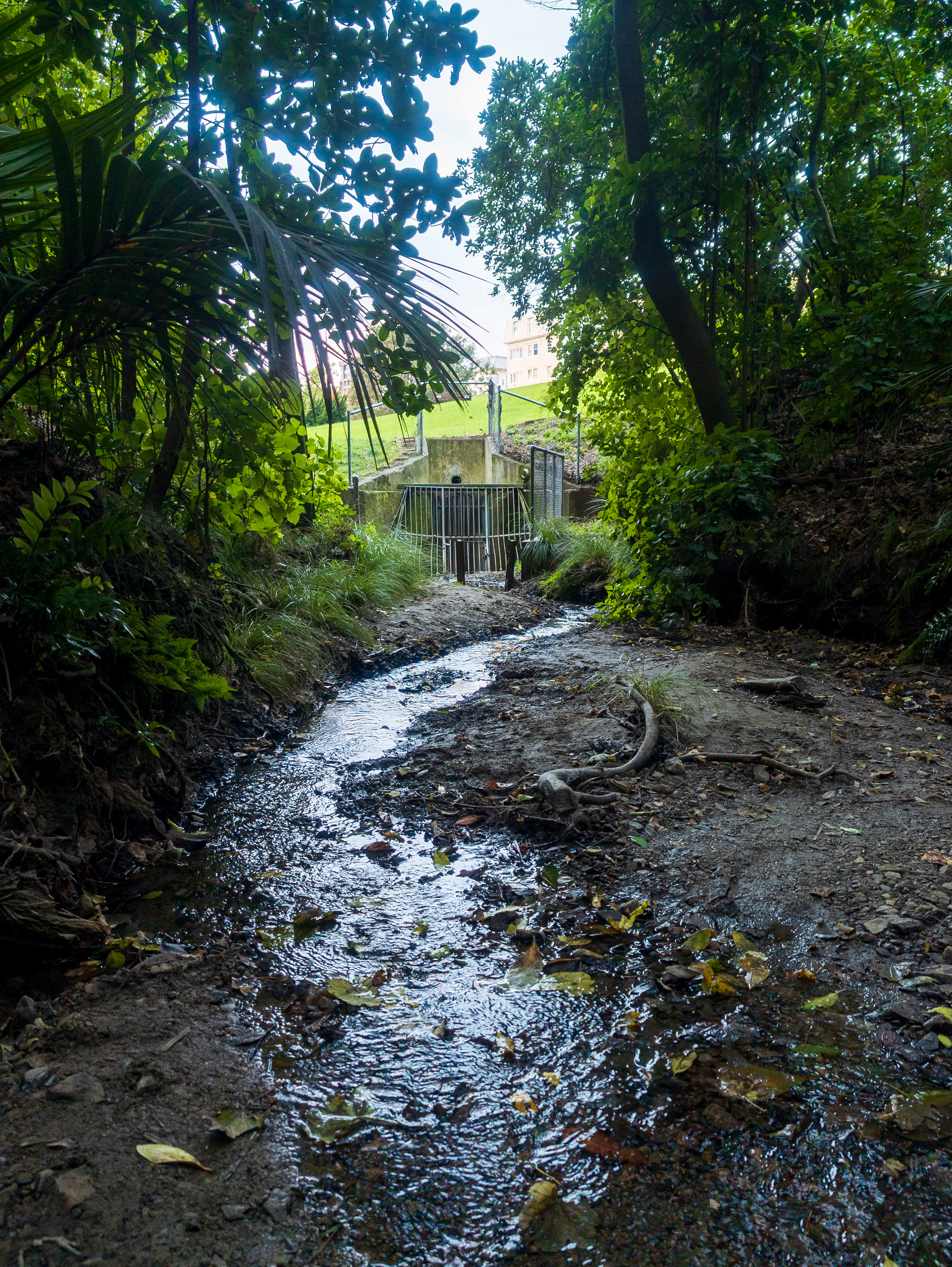
- The Kumutoto Stream as it enters the culvert above the Terrace Motorway Tunnel
- Etymology: Māori: 'bleeding from behind'
- Native name: Kumutoto Awa (Māori)

Location
- Country: New Zealand
- City: Wellington

Physical characteristics
- Source: Kumutoto Forest
  - location: Kelburn
  - coordinates: 41.2880°S 174.7703°E
- Mouth: Kumutoto Plaza
  - location: Wellington Harbour
  - coordinates: 41.2828°S 174.7791°E
- Length: 2 km (1.2 mi)

Heritage New Zealand – Wāhi Tūpuna
- Official name: Kumutoto
- Designated: 1 August 2025
- Reference no.: 9078

The Kumutoto Stream (Māori: Kumutoto Awa) is a culverted stream in Wellington, New Zealand. In the 1860s, it was the first stream in Wellington to be culverted. A part of the stream is listed as Wāhi Tūpuna by Heritage New Zealand.

The stream runs via pipes down Kelburn Parade, before opening into the Kumutoto Forest. From there, it re-enters a culvert above the Terrace Motorway Tunnel, before running through underground pipes alongside The Terrace and Woodward St out to Wellington Harbour.

An art installation by Michel Tuffery, featuring large kina shell sculptures, marks the stream's entrance into the harbour.

== Course ==
The stream begins at the base of the Pukehinau Ridge (where Victoria University of Wellington now sits), and runs via pipes down Kelburn Parade, before it opens up for approximately 90 metres (300 ft) in the Kumutoto Forest, located beneath Salamanca Road. From there, it enters a culvert above the Terrace Motorway Tunnel, and flows through underground pipes alongside The Terrace until it reaches the Wellington Club, where it turns and runs beneath Woodward Street, before entering Wellington Harbour at Kumutoto Plaza.

Prior to land land reclamations following the 1855 Wairarapa earthquake, the stream entered the harbour at the present-day location of Midland Park.

== History ==
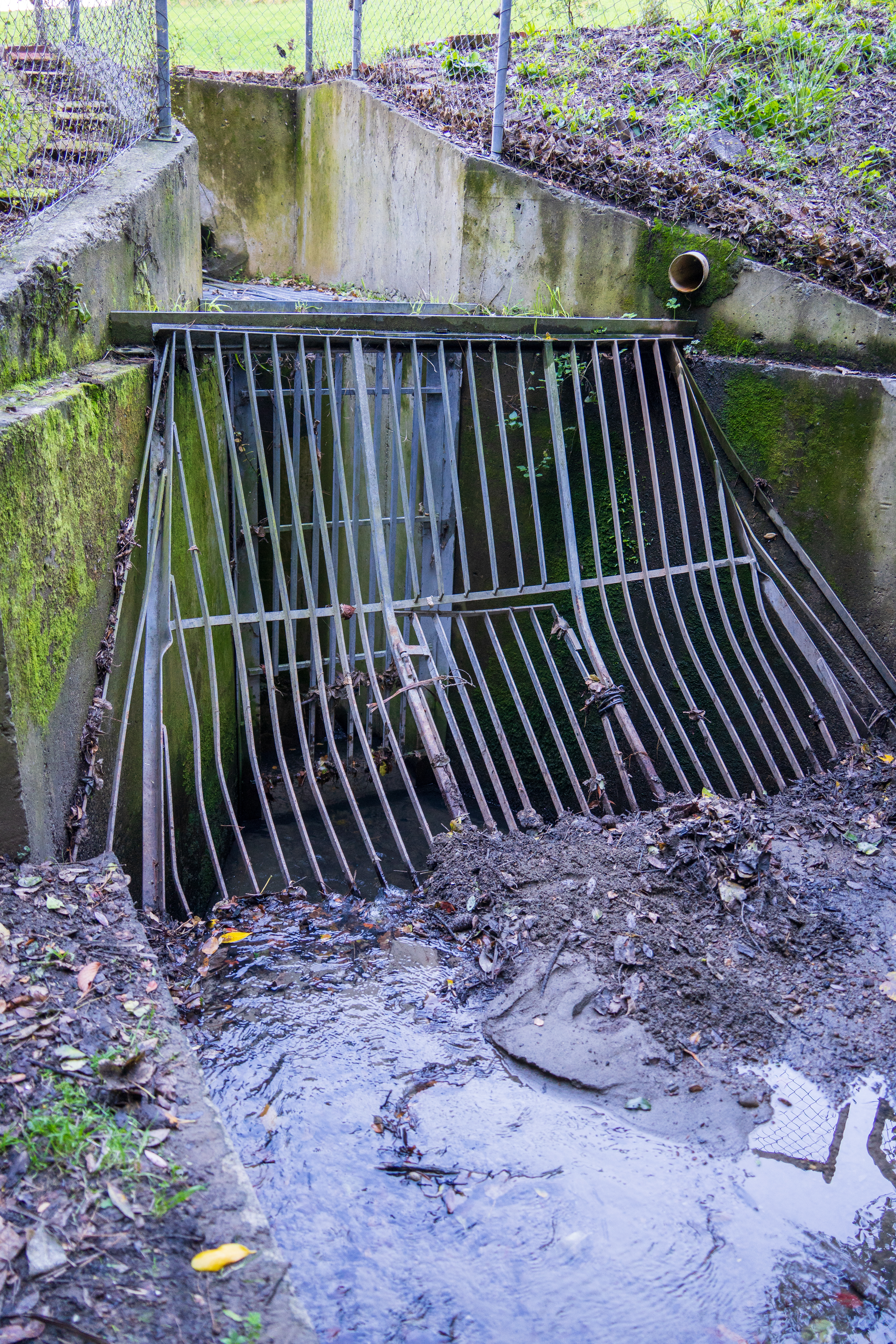
The culvert above the Terrace Motorway Tunnel

In the 1860s, Kumutoto was the first of Wellington's nine urban streams to be buried into culverts, concrete pipes and stormwater drains. The construction of a brick culvert at the stream's mouth was put out to tender in 1857, and was built by 1861. In 1868, the culvert beneath Woodward Street burst and needed to be replaced, and required many of the brick culverts built further downstream to be reopened and cleared of debris. In August 1873, the stream again burst and tore up the road at the bottom of Woodward Street.

Prior to the mayoralship of Sir Francis Bell in the 1890s, Kumutoto and other streams within the city were used as sewers by early Wellingtonians, contributing to the pollution of Wellington Harbour.

In July 1896, another portion of the culvert collapsed following heavy rain, leaving a "gaping hole" near the entrance of the Wellington Club on The Terrace, whilst in 1906, part of the road in front of the club collapsed beneath the weight of a cart due to erosion from the buried stream.

By the 1920s, the stream ran above ground from Kumutoto Forest to The Terrace, where it entered a culvert opposite Boulcott Street. The final parts of the stream were culverted in the 1970s, with the construction of the Terrace Motorway Tunnel and a section of SH1 along the stream bed.

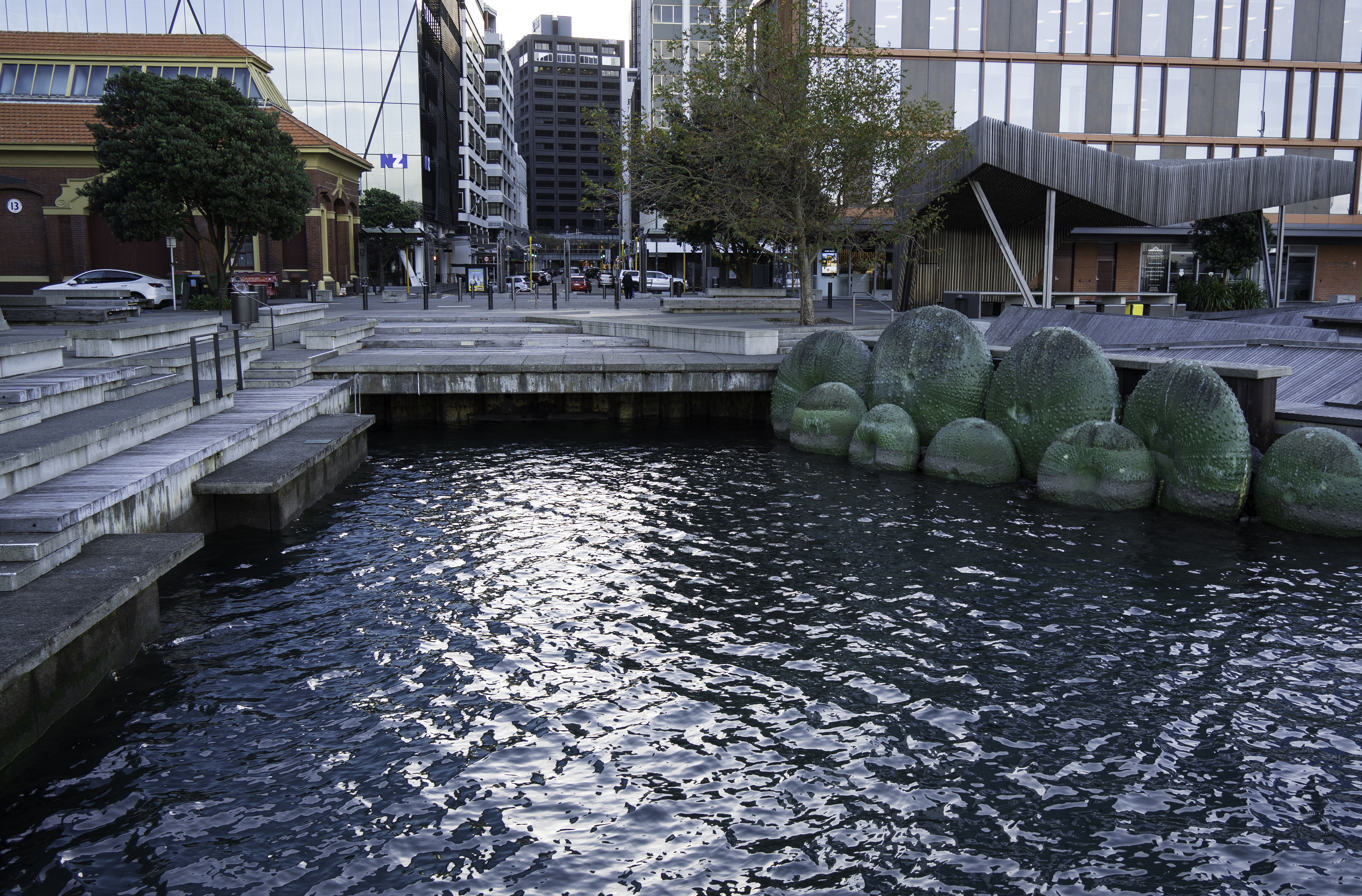
The Kumutoto Stream's outlet (centre) into Wellington Harbour. To its right is Michel Tuffery's sculpture of kina shells

A number of public artworks mark the stream's path in central Wellington. In 2012, sculptor Michel Tuffery's Nga Kina was installed in Kumutoto Plaza, at the stream's entrance into Wellington Harbour. Nga Kina consists of nine concrete kina shells, ranging in size from two to three metres in diameter. Kumutoto Stream, an audio soundscape by Wellington artist Kedron Parker, plays the sounds of running water and native birdsong in the Woodward Street pedestrian tunnel, to "[imagine] the area in its natural state before development, [and] evoke the experience of walking along the former Kumutoto Stream." Installed in February 2014, the work was originally meant to run until the Wellington Fringe Festival in March, before being kept as a permanent installation.

By the 21st century, only 90 metres (300 ft) of the approximately 2-kilometre-long (1.2 mi) stream remained above ground. This above-ground section, within the Kumutoto Forest, was listed as Wāhi Tūpuna (of historic cultural significance to Māori) by Heritage New Zealand in 2025.

=== Proposed daylighting ===
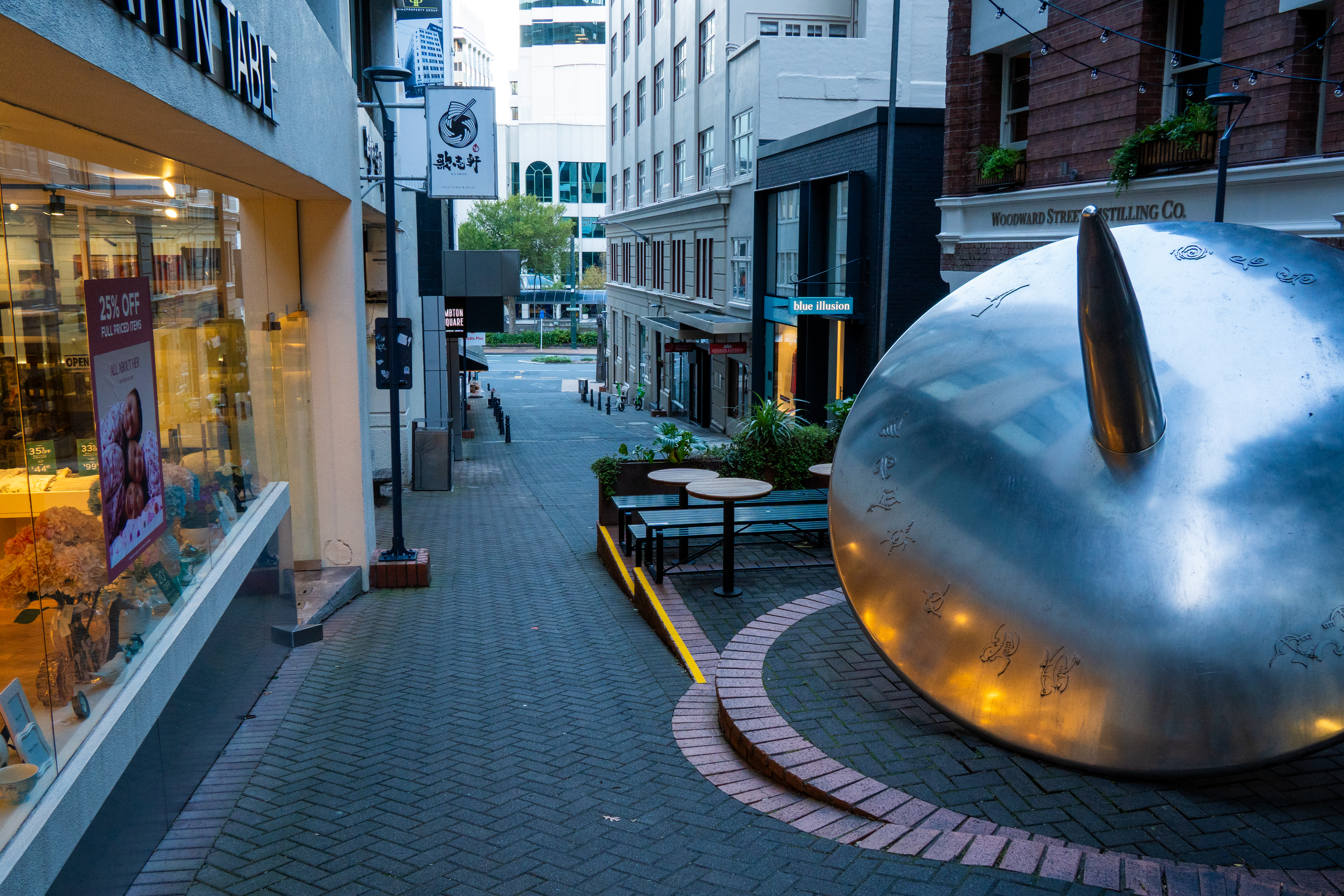
Woodward Street, looking down to Lambton Quay and Midland Park. The street was built on the Kumutoto, which now runs through a culvert beneath it.

In 2015, it was estimated that 95.5% of Wellington's streams were culverted underground. Over the years, there have been proposals to daylight parts of the Kumutoto, but none have developed beyond a concept.

During the 2022 Wellington Regional Council election, Green Party-endorsed candidates proposed daylighting parts of Wellington's urban streams, including Kumutoto, and in 2025 local architect Allistar Cox designed a concept to daylight the stream on upper Woodward Street and further down along Waring Taylor Street, as part of a wider urban development proposal.

A conservation group, the Kumutoto Restoration Project, have also advocated for daylighting the stream above the Terrace Motorway Tunnel, and constructing a fish ladder to connect to the existing pipe beneath the road.

== Etymology ==
The name of the river translates to "bleeding from the behind", from the Māori language words kumu ('from behind' / 'backside') and toto ('to bleed'). For Māori, the stream "was tapu (or restricted) for birthing practices", and a birthing pool was located in the stream beneath what is now the Wellington Club.

== Ecology ==
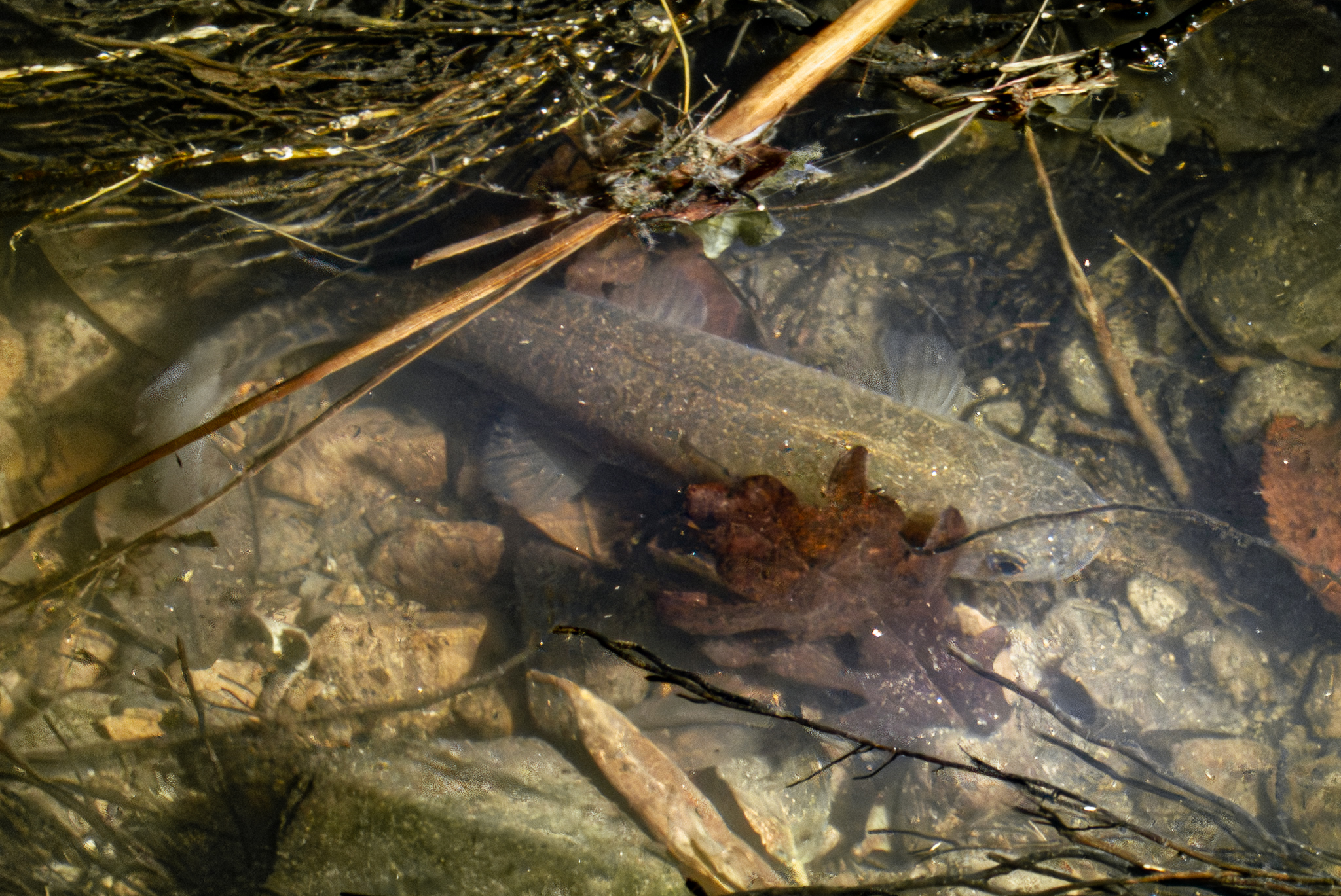
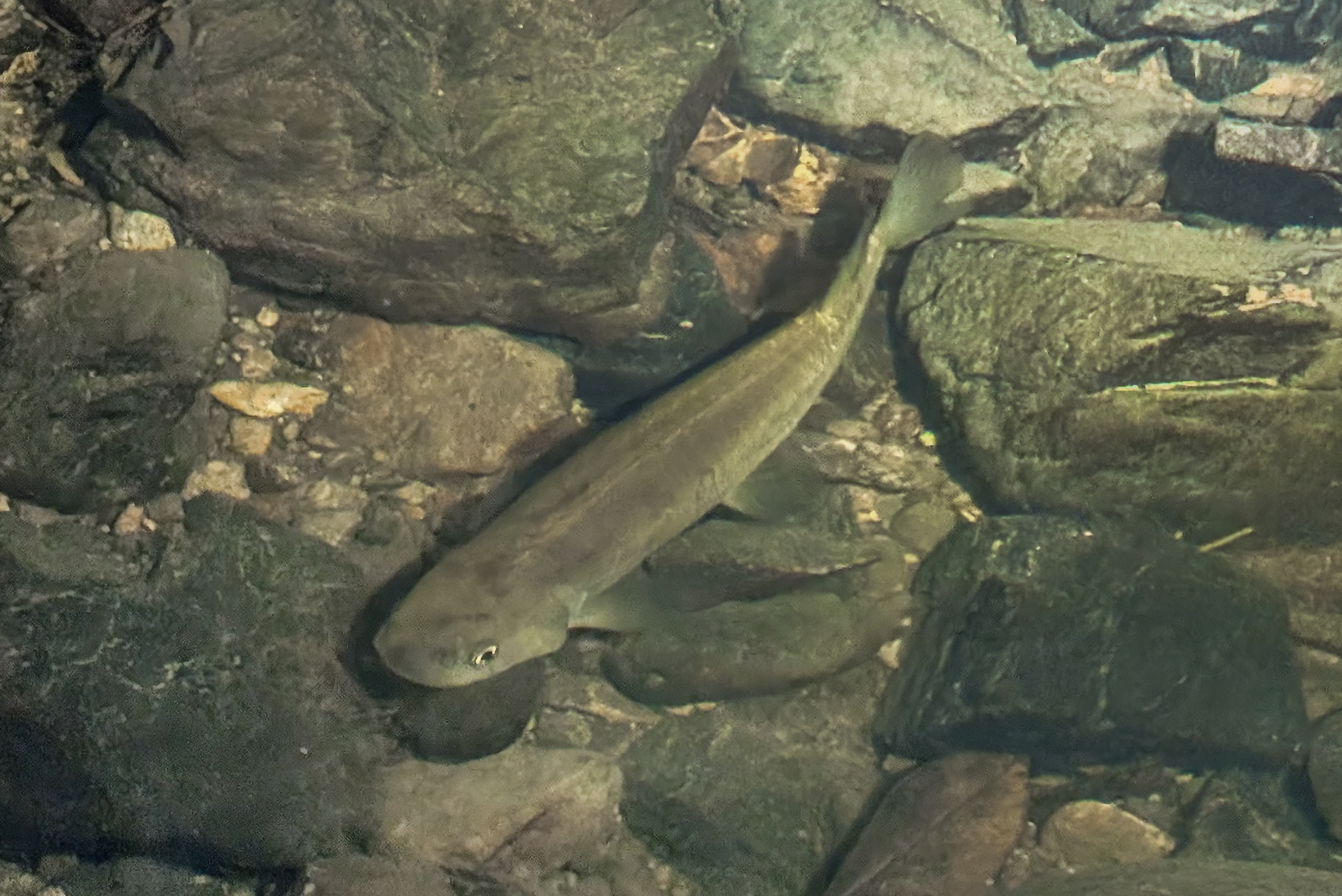
Banded kōkopu in Kumutoto Stream, found while spotlighting.

Only three species of native fish have been recorded in the unculverted section of the stream: banded kōkopu, kōaro (climbing galaxias), and eels. As diadromous species, they migrate up the underground pipes and climb the culvert to the daylight sections of the stream. In the 19th century, before being culverted, the stream was also home to inanga and native bullies, but due to being poor climbers they, along with giant kōkopu, are unable to migrate past the culvert and other barriers.

Poet and former Victoria University lecturer Alice Te Punga Somerville once recalled a Ngāti Awa elder visiting her office and talking about the eels that still swim up the stream via the culvert, joking that "no one told the eels to stop acting like eels".

Kumutoto's water quality and overall stream health was rated as "Fair", based on a Macroinvertebrate Community Index (MCI) survey conducted between 2016–2019. It found Kumutoto is home primarily to macroinvertebrates with a greater tolerance of poor habitat and water quality, with a higher abundance of species of Diptera (two-winged flies), Oligochaeta (worms) and Mollusca (mainly Potamopyrgus and Physa freshwater snail species) compared to other streams in the Wellington region.

== Kumutoto Pā ==
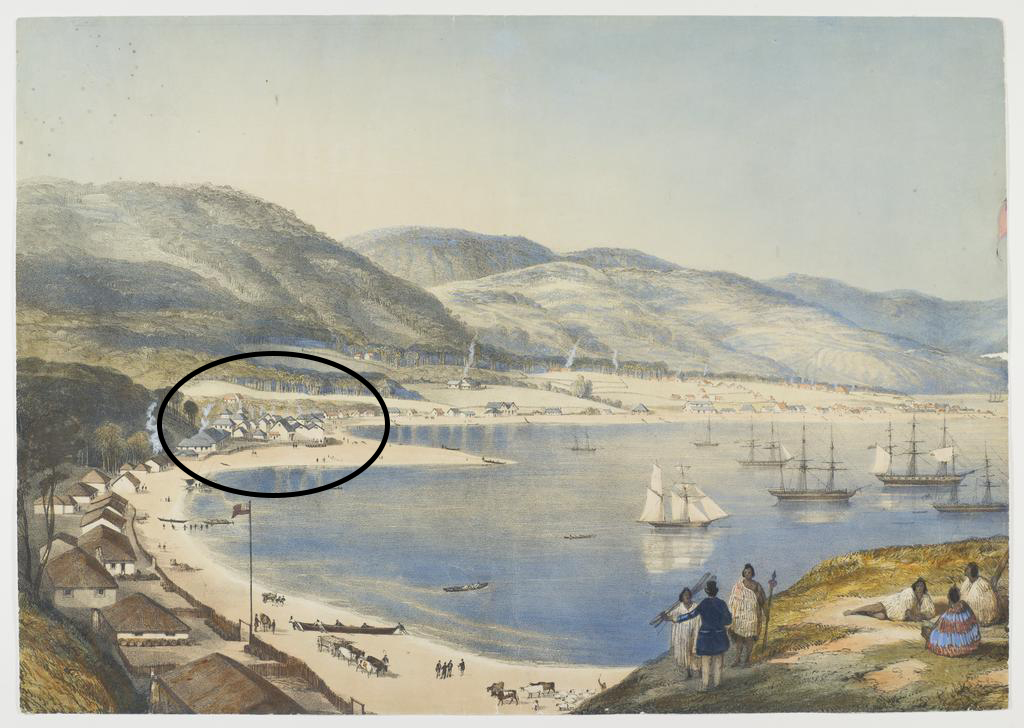
Kumutoto Pā (circled), in an 1841 illustration of Port Nicholson by Charles Heaphy

A kāinga ('settlement'), known as Kumutoto Pā, was established by Wiremu Piti Pōmare of Ngāti Mutunga at the stream's mouth in 1824. It was ceded to Ngātata-i-te-rangi of Te Āti Awa in 1835. The pā was an important hub for flax trading and fishing in the region, and was home to a tāpu ('sacred') birthing pool within the stream.

The buildings at Kumutoto Pā were destroyed in a large fire on 9 November 1842, and by 1850 the settlement was largely abandoned. The settlement's chief, Wi Tako Ngātata, son of Ngātata-i-te-rangi, exchanged Kumutoto for land in Lower Hutt, moving there in 1853, and the remnants of the pā disappeared as Wellington developed.

The former pā site was at the intersections of the Woodward St and The Terrace / Lambton Quay, and sat on the former shoreline of Wellington Harbour prior to land reclamations that followed the 1855 Wairarapa earthquake.

== See also ==
- List of rivers of Wellington Region
