= Ngātata-i-te-rangi =

Te Āti Awa leader

Ngātata-i-te-rangi (? – 1854), known as Ngātata for short, was a leader of the Te Āti Awa Māori tribe of New Zealand, and the tribe's Ngāi Te Whiti hapū.

Ngātata was born in Taranaki in the late 18th century, the son of father Te Rangiwhētiki and mother Pakanga. He was of Ngāi Te Whiti chiefly descent through his mother. He was a brother of Te Marokura. He married Whetowheto and had five children, one being Wi Tako Ngātata. Later in life he had a second wife and they had a daughter named Meri Haratua.

Ngātata was among the Taranaki people who migrated from Taranaki to Waikanae in about 1824. He went with Ngāti Mutunga, led by his nephew Pōmare. The migrants moved on to Wellington Harbour a year later. Ngātata established Kumutoto Pā in present-day Wellington city alongside Pōmare.

Ngātata signed the Treaty of Waitangi in Wellington on 29 April 1840.
