= Te Ahumairangi Hill =

Hill located in Wellington, New Zealand

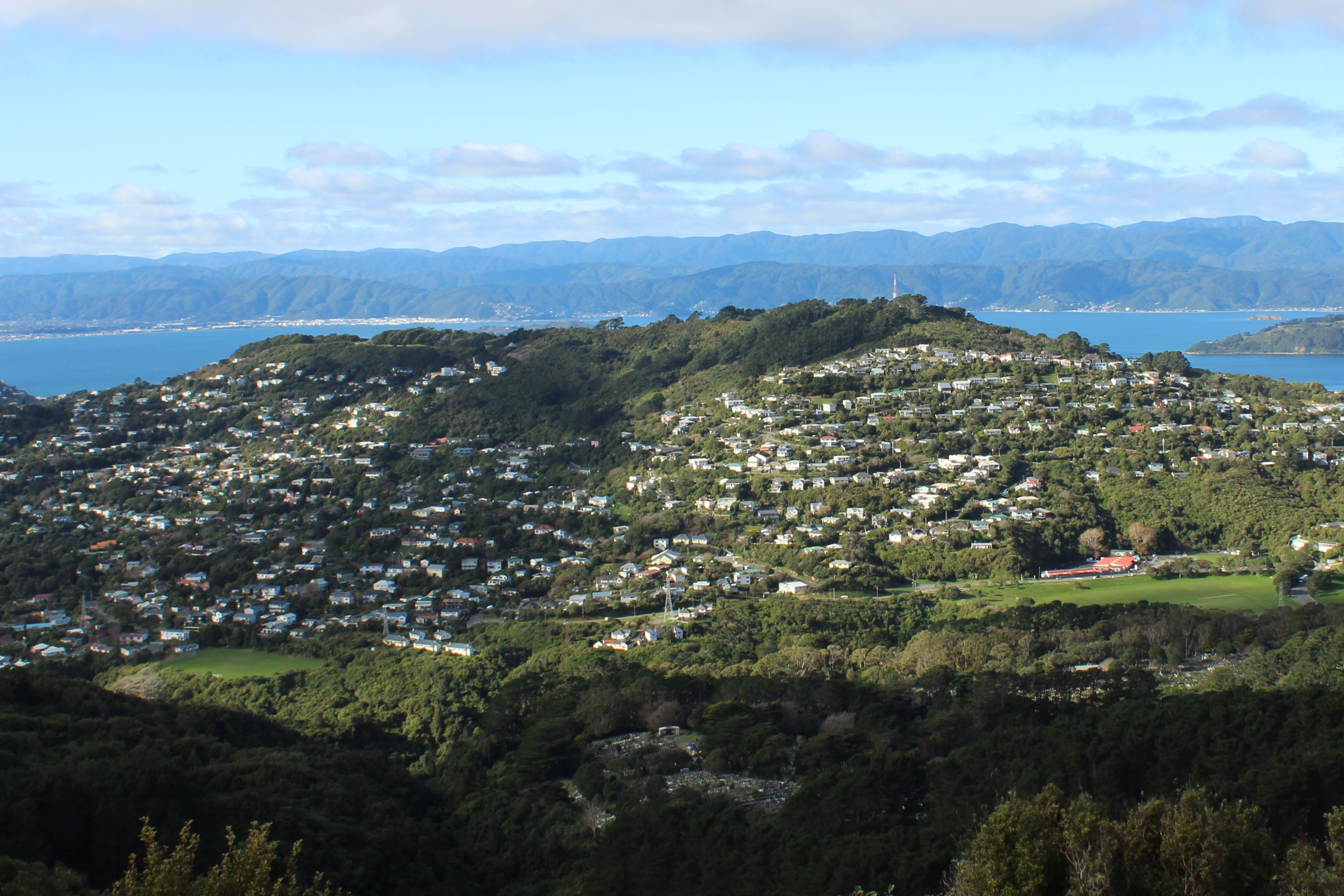
Te Ahumairangi Hill from the west in 2025

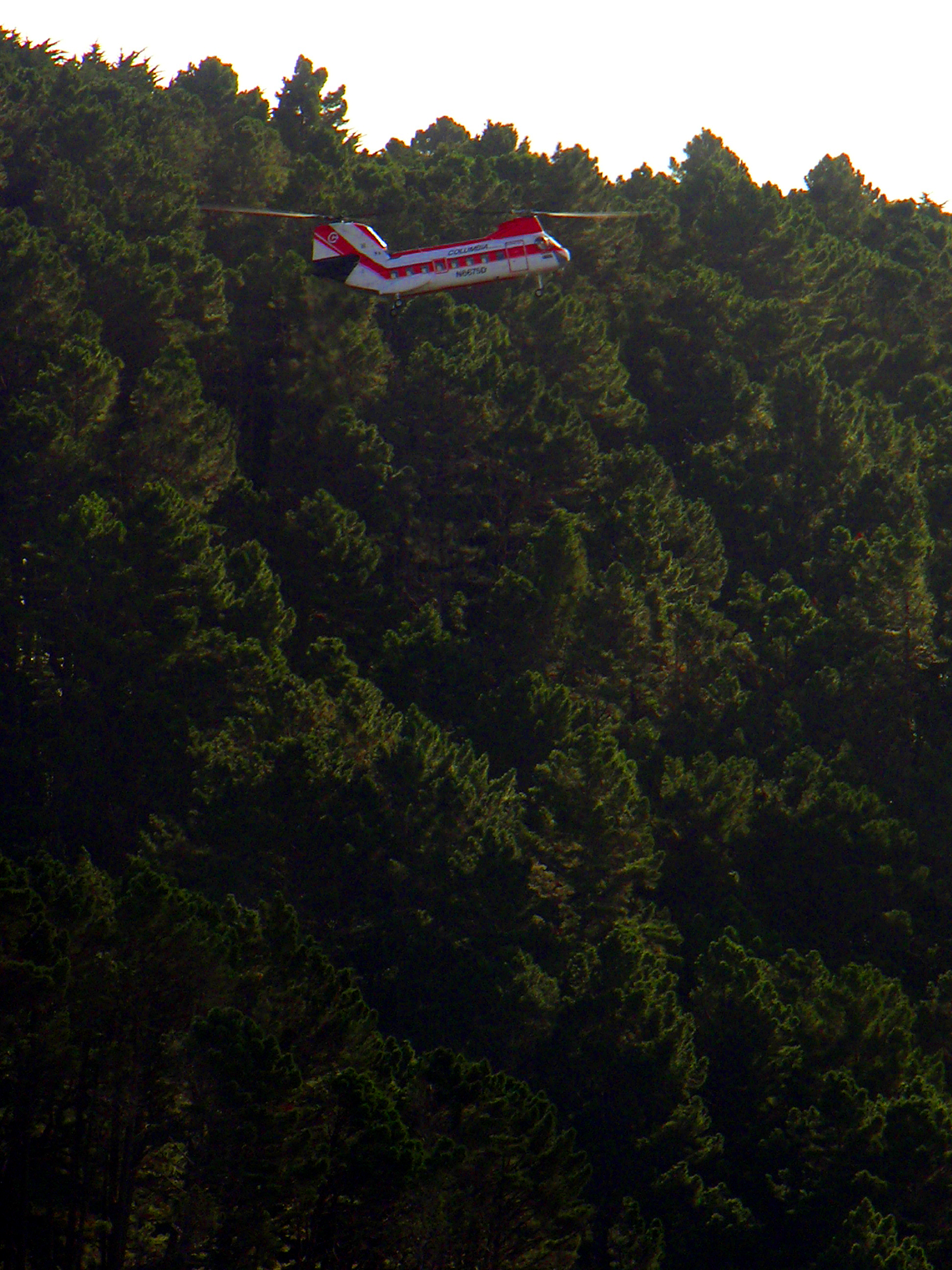
Helicopter logging 2004 storm windfalls on Te Ahumairangi, 2005

Te Ahumairangi Hill (formerly known as Tinakori Hill) is a hill running for over 100 hectares through the Town Belt of Wellington, New Zealand. It was renamed Te Ahumairangi Hill as part of the Port Nicholson Block (Taranaki Whānui ki Te Upoko o te Ika) Claims Settlement Act 2009. The suburb of Wadestown lies to the north, with Wilton, and Northland to the west and south-west. Te Ahumairangi lies within Thorndon which continues to its south-east.

== History ==
Originally, the whole ridgeline was called Te Ahumairangi.

The former name of the hill, Tinakori, comes from the Māori Tina-kore and is of uncertain origin. In Māori, tina is both a word meaning "satisfying" as well as a transliteration of the English word "dinner", and kāhore or kore means "none". Hence potential translations of Tina-kore as "unsatisfying" or "dinnerless". One folk etymology given for this name is that, during early European settlement, a road was built along the base of the ridge, and the Māori labourers had to work through their meal breaks. The complaint of the labourers therefore became the name of both the road and the hill. Another folk etymology suggests that the name is instead based on remarks made by Te Paki, a relative of Wi Tako Ngātata, when some officials visited a Māori hamlet regarding land business: "Ka mate nga pakeha....I te tina kore hoki." ("The Pākehā will fare badly....On account of the lack of 'dinner'.")

The hill was an important site for radio transmission, with 45 aerials along its length at one time, and a receiving station at the peak. The latter was demolished in 1975. There is now a microwave repeater which handles South Island television signals and cellphone coverage.

Storms in 2004 felled hundreds of trees and required the removal of 10.5 hectares of pines from the steep lower slopes the following year. 10,000 new trees have since been planted. Further storms felled more trees in June 2013 and parts of the Northern Walkway across the hill were closed.

A new lookout and car park were opened in November 2010.

== Threatened species ==
The critically endangered freshwater snail species Potamopyrgus oppidanus is found only on Te Ahumairangi hill. A recent survey of the species indicates a decline in population. It has been suggested that the building of illegal mountain bike tracks through its habitat is having a detrimental effect on its survival. Tradescantia fluminensis is also contributing to this decline as the weed is smothering snail habitat.
