= The Terrace, Wellington =

Street in New Zealand

Coordinates: 41°16′55″S 174°46′30″E

The Terrace
- Interactive map of The Terrace
- Maintained by: Wellington City Council
- Length: 1.85 km (1.15 mi)
- Location: Wellington, New Zealand
- North end: Bowen Street
- South end: Abel Smith Street

The Terrace, formerly known as Wellington Terrace, is one of the main streets in Wellington, New Zealand's central business district, and one of the oldest streets in the city. The southern part of the Terrace retains large Victorian-era wooden houses, while some government departments have their head offices at the lower northern end of the street. The Terrace is also home to several office buildings that have been converted to student accommodation for the nearby Victoria University of Wellington.

== Location ==
The Terrace stretches 1.85 km from Bowen Street in the north to Abel Smith Street in the south. The northern part of the Terrace, originally known as Wellington Terrace, was so called because it is situated on a ridge or terrace above Lambton Quay. The southern end of the street was known as Woolcombe Street until it became part of the Terrace in 1937. To the east are Lambton Quay and other streets of the central business district, much of which is on reclaimed land, and beyond that Wellington Harbour. The Wellington Urban Motorway lies to the west of the Terrace and partly parallel to it. Part of the motorway was constructed along a gully that ran behind the Terrace. The Terrace Tunnel passes underneath the Terrace and marks the end of the motorway.

Kumutoto Stream arose from a spring below Central Terrace in Kelburn, and formerly flowed through properties along the Terrace as far as the Wellington Club. Then it turned and ran down a gully that is now Woodward Street to the former shoreline at Lambton Quay. The stream was culverted in stages in the nineteenth century, beginning in 1866.

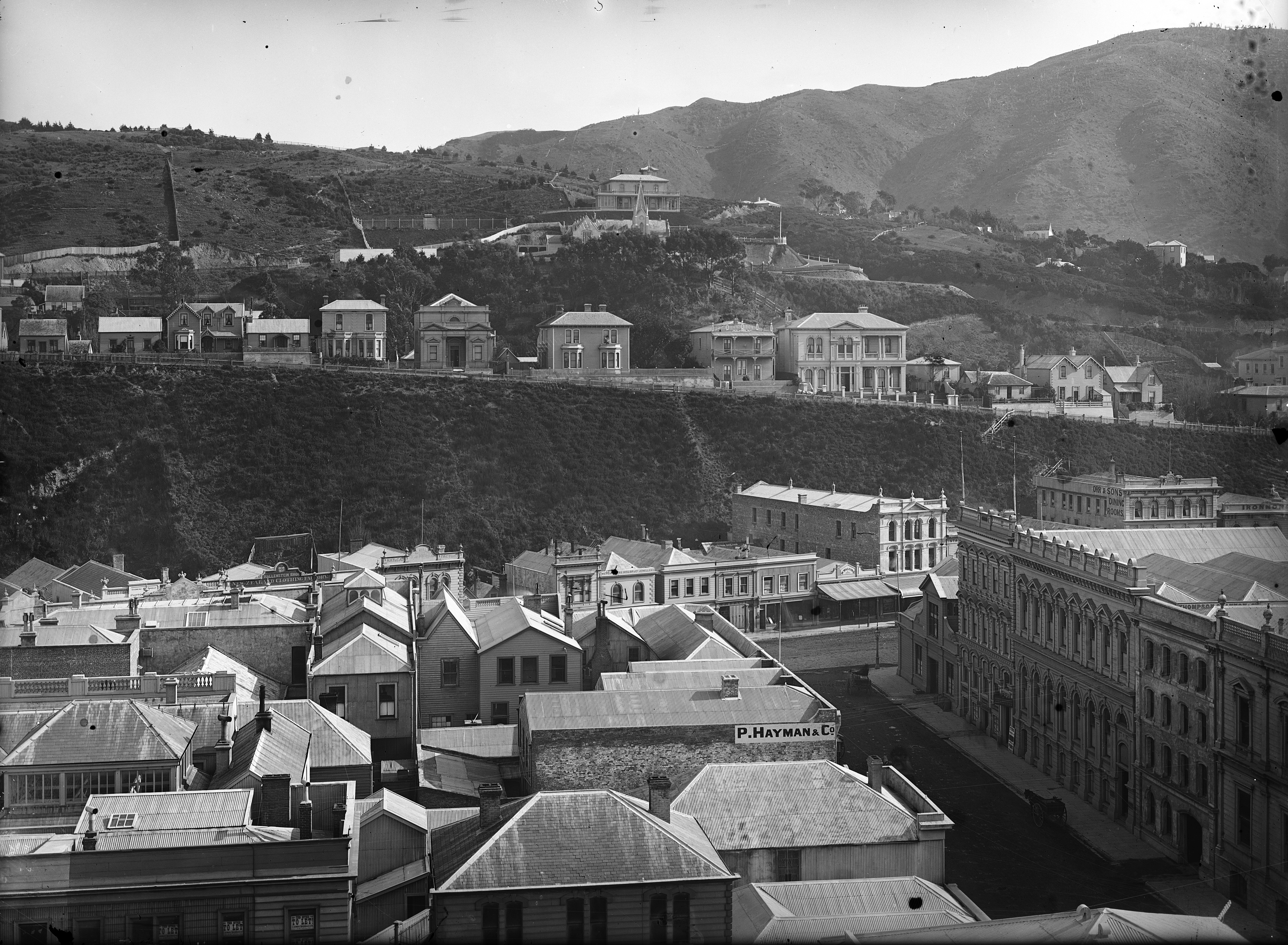
The Terrace from Post Office Tower, 1880s, with the synagogue visible in the centre of the row of houses. Panama Street at bottom right.

=== Access ===
Various lanes and flights of stairs provide pedestrian access between the Terrace and Lambton Quay. Many of the multi-storey office buildings along Lambton Quay provide publicly-accessible lifts or escalators between the two streets. The Church Street steps connect the Terrace to the intersection of Willis and Boulcott Streets.

Vehicular access is via Bowen Street, Boulcott Street and several other streets further south. There is an offramp from the Wellington Urban Motorway onto the Terrace.

== History ==
Kumutoto Pā or kainga (a village or settlement) was located near what is now the Wellington Club on the Terrace, alongside the Kumutoto Stream. Kumutoto kainga was established by Ngāti Mutunga and Ngāti Tama when they settled at Wellington in the 1820s. The settlement became important as a flax-collection centre for several years after a flax trader bought 3.5 acres of Kumutoto land from Pomare Ngatata in 1831. Pomare Ngatata and his followers departed for the Chatham Islands in 1835, and Wi Tako Ngātata then settled at Kumutoto for a few years. All of the buildings at Kumutoto Pā were destroyed in a large fire on 9 November 1842, and in 1850 the settlement was noted as abandoned.

In 1845 a wooden bridge was built over the Kumutoto Stream gully (at Woodward Street), and two other streams crossing the Terrace were channelled into brick tunnels so that the whole street could be levelled to form a continuous carriageway from the Bowen Street end to Te Aro.

Various public buildings were built on the Terrace during the nineteenth and early twentieth centuries. The Terrace Gaol was built at the southern end of The Terrace (then called Woolcombe Street) in 1853. It was demolished in 1927 and Te Aro School was built on the site in 1931. The Beth El synagogue opened in 1870, and was replaced with a new brick building on the same site in 1929. That building was demolished in the 1970s. The Terrace Congregational Church was built on the corner of the Terrace and Bowen Street in 1888, and demolished in 1954 to make way for the Reserve Bank building which was completed in 1973. Banks Commercial College moved to the Terrace in 1920. At the same time they opened a boys' school on their site, naming it Wellesley College. The school shifted to Days Bay in 1940, and Shell House was later built on the Terrace site. St Andrew's Church was built in 1923.

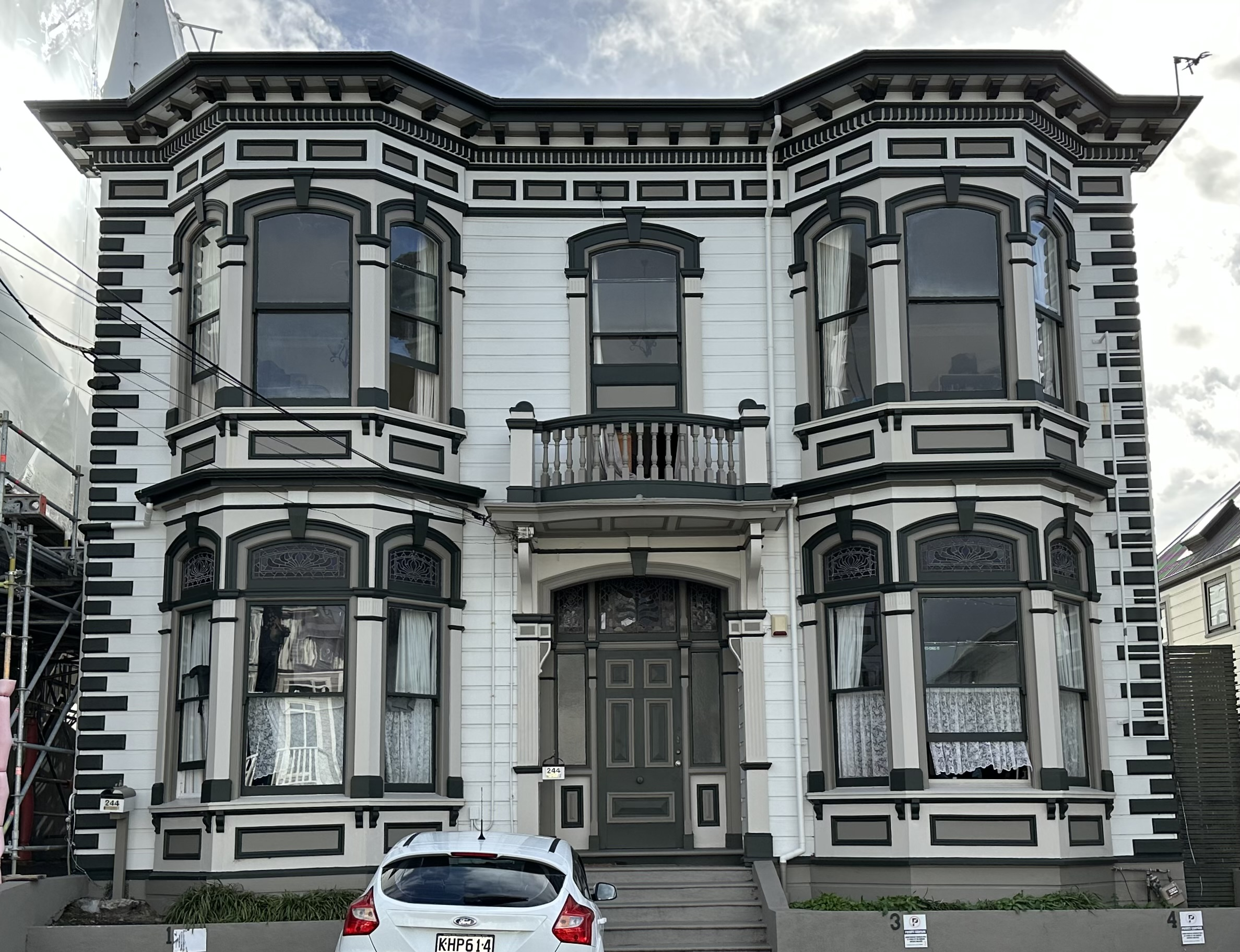
244 The Terrace, built in 1898 and converted to two flats in 1934

By the 1920s the west (uphill) side of the Terrace was a mix of houses, schools, religious buildings, and medical practices. Large, elaborate wooden houses formed a wealthy residential neighbourhood at the southern end of the Terrace. By the 1920s the large homes were becoming difficult to manage, and some were demolished or converted to flats or boarding houses. New building methods meant that it was possible to build taller and stronger buildings, leading to construction of purpose-built blocks of flats such as the five-storey Braemar Flats (1925) and Franconia (1938). In the 1940s and 1950s the Terrace was still largely residential and was a popular student housing area.

High-rise development on the Terrace began in the 1960s. The first commercial high-rise office building in Wellington was Massey House, built in the early 1950s on Lambton Quay with a façade on the Terrace. In 1960 Shell House (now Transpower House) at 96-102 The Terrace became the first modern office block built on the Terrace, and the first building in New Zealand to be fully air-conditioned. Standing high above Lambton Quay and its neighbours on the Terrace, Shell House was a prominent landmark in the 1960s. The first purpose-built high-rise apartment block built on the Terrace was Jellicoe Towers, a 14-storey building completed in 1965.

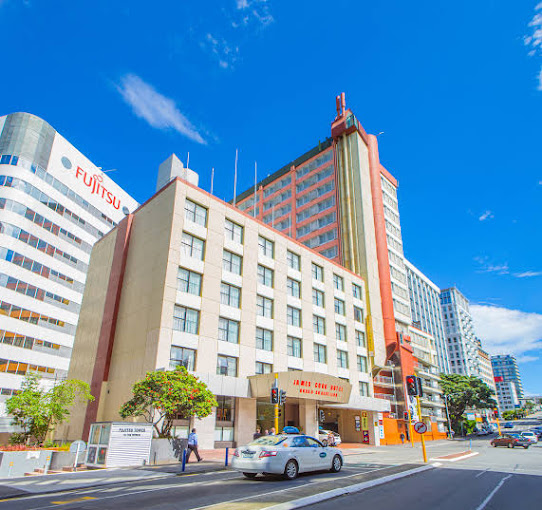
The James Cook Hotel Grand Chancellor

The James Cook Hotel opened in 1972 and at that time was the tallest building in New Zealand. It was significant as the first new hotel built in Wellington since the 1930s, introducing a new international standard in hotel accommodation and facilities. As of 2025, the hotel is part of the Grand Chancellor chain and branded as 'James Cook Hotel Grand Chancellor'.

From the early 1990s, there was a period of government cutbacks and big changes in technology. Many corporate head offices moved from Wellington to Auckland, leading to a decline in the demand for office space in the central business district including the Terrace. Since this period, various office blocks on the Terrace have been converted to accommodation. Early examples include ICL House (126 The Terrace) and Hume House (152 The Terrace), office buildings built in the 1960s, which were converted into apartments in the mid-1990s. Unilodge Stafford House at 40 The Terrace consists of 102 two- and three-bedroom apartments. It was constructed in 1981 as an office building and converted into accommodation for Victoria University students in 2002. As of 2025, units are privately owned but rented to students and young professionals. Joan Stevens Hall at 132 The Terrace, formerly an office building known as Randstad House, opened in 2011 as accommodation for 242 Victoria University students in single rooms. Katharine Jermyn Hall, on the corner of Boulcott Street and the Terrace, is a Victoria University hostel for 390 students in single rooms. It opened in February 2015 in a converted and strengthened 1970s-era office building.

== Notable buildings ==
=== Wellington Club ===
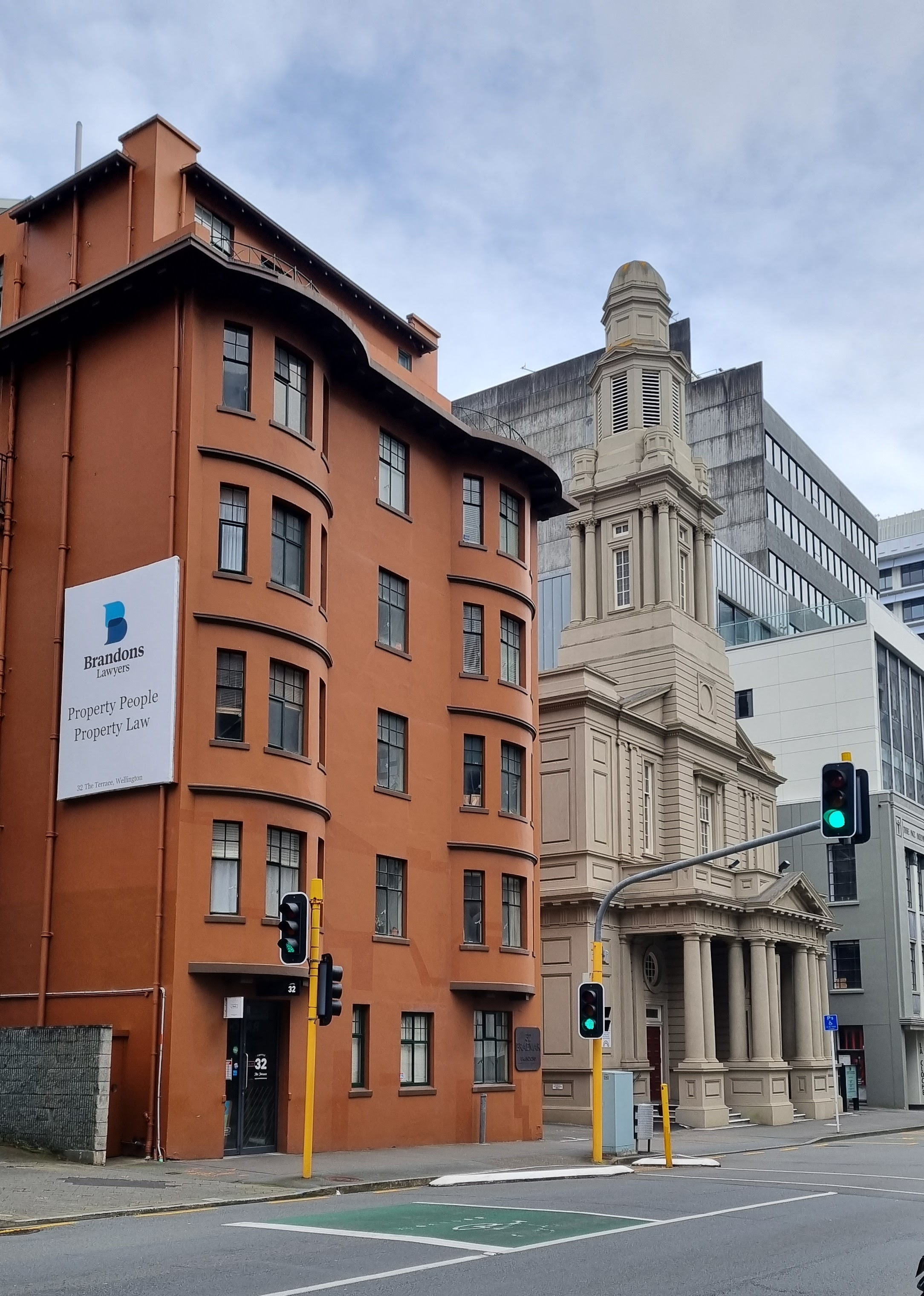
Braemar Flats and St Andrew's Church

The Wellington Club is a private club situated on three floors of a 1989 six-storey building at 88 The Terrace. There is a 17-storey office building at the rear of the site. Established in 1841 for men only, the Wellington Club is New Zealand's oldest private club (women were admitted from 1993), and has been located at this site since 1877. The original building on the site was built in the Victorian style. The site was compulsorily acquired in the 1970s to enable the construction of the Wellington Urban Motorway and the building was demolished. The area of the site was reduced by one third. New club buildings designed by Roger Walker were constructed on the front portion of the section. In 1986, those buildings were also demolished, to allow for the construction of the current building.

There is a large old pōhutukawa tree in front of the building. When Warren & Mahoney was designing the Wellington Club's new building in the late 1980s, they created a frontage with a large curved indentation to accommodate the spreading branches of the tree. There were problems with droppings from the thousands of sparrows and starlings that roosted in the tree each night, as club members had to pass directly under the tree to enter the building. Several solutions were tried: nets, starling alarm calls, hosing the birds and placing stuffed rats in the tree to try to scare the birds away. Eventually, a large arched verandah was built over the entrance to protect visitors to the building.

=== Braemar Flats ===
The Braemar Flats building at 32 The Terrace is a five-storey concrete building with bow-fronted oriel windows. It was built in 1924 as apartments for professionals, and had a doctor's rooms on the ground floor. In 1965 the building was sold and began to be used as offices rather than accommodation. It has a Heritage New Zealand Historic Place Category 2 classification, reflecting its architectural significance as a concrete building of its time with many of its internal features intact and social significance as an early example of high-density housing.

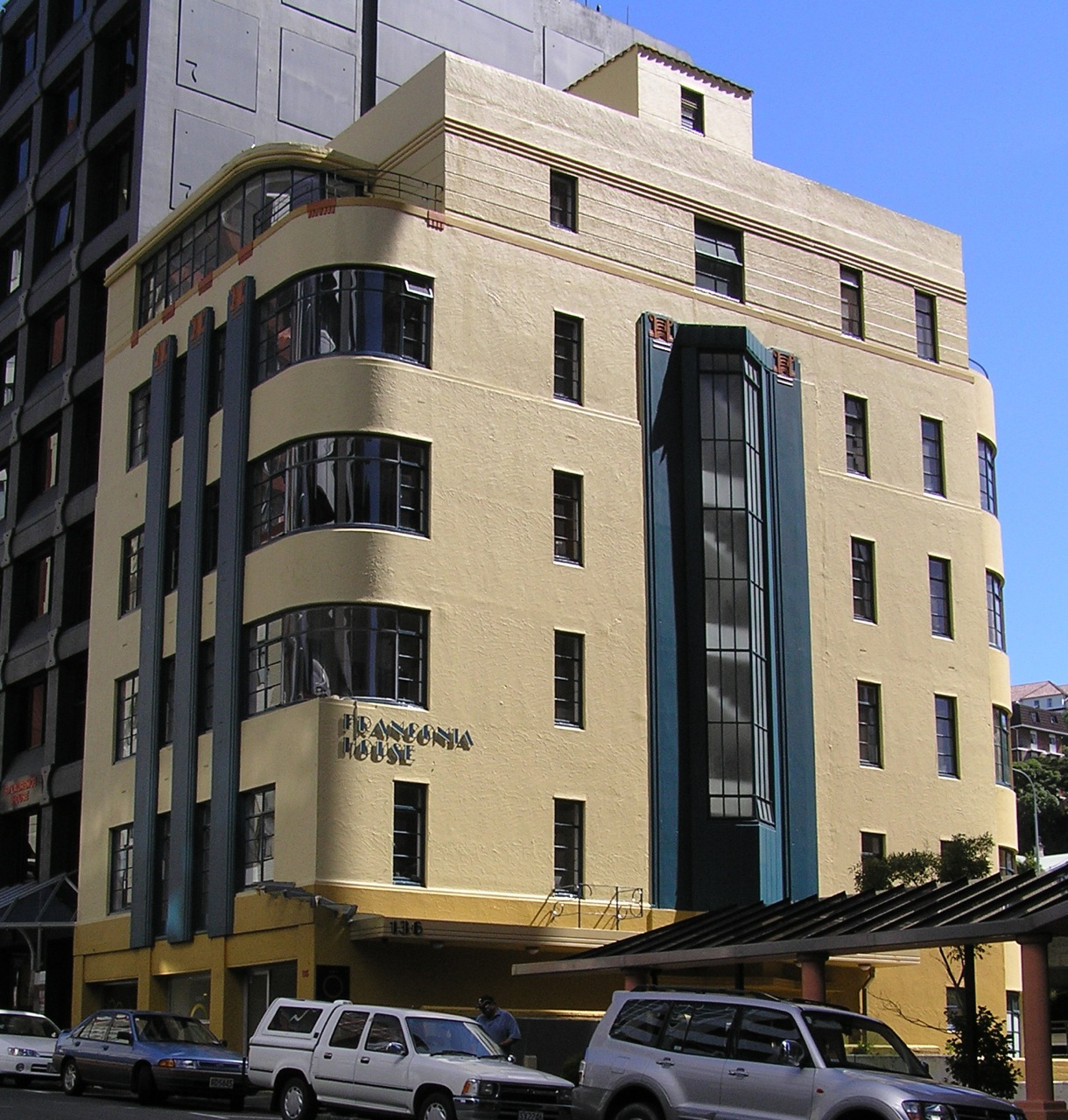
Franconia

=== Franconia ===
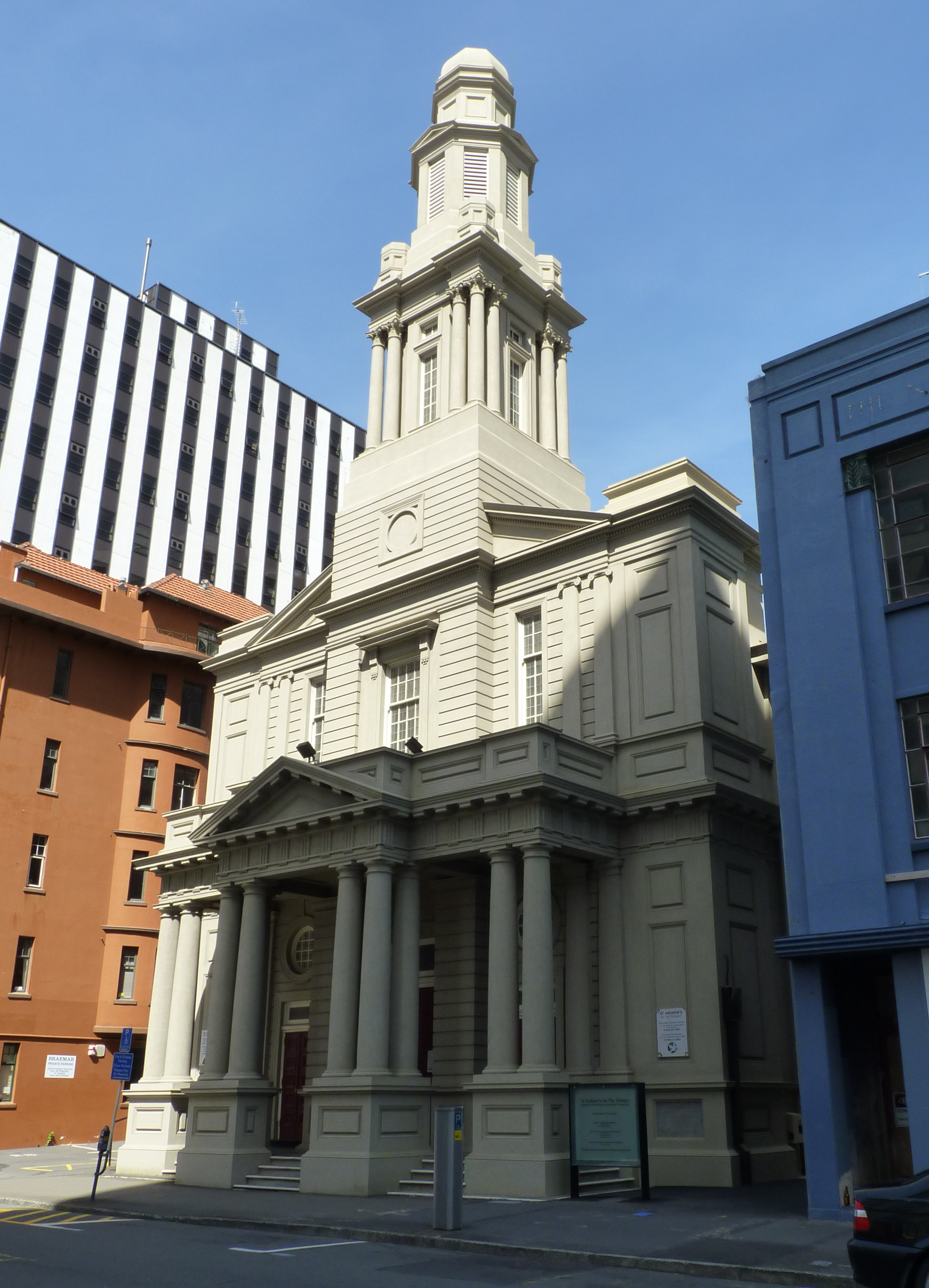
St Andrew's on The Terrace

Franconia is a five-storey concrete apartment block at 136 The Terrace. It was designed by Edmund Anscombe in a Streamline Moderne style and completed in 1938. The flats were rented to middle-class professionals. In 1962 Franconia was sold, and from this time it began to be used as offices rather than accommodation. Franconia was renamed Lintas House in the 1970s, then renamed Invincible House in the late 1980s. It gained notoriety in 1994 when Gene and Eugene Thomas were murdered in their offices in the building. Franconia has a Historic Place Category 2 classification from Heritage New Zealand, which says it is significant for its distinctive façade and as an example of "high-density inner city living".

=== St Andrew's on the Terrace ===
St Andrew’s on the Terrace is a Presbyterian church at 28-30 The Terrace. It was completed in 1923 to replace a wooden church on the site that had burned down in 1920. St Andrews was designed by architect Frederick De Jersey Clere and is notable for its English Baroque style and construction in reinforced concrete, which was unusual for a large church during the 1920s. Heritage New Zealand states that St Andrews "is the only example of English Baroque architecture in New Zealand". In 1962 the interior layout was redesigned, and in 2008 the church was earthquake-strengthened. The church has a Historic Place Category 1 listing from Heritage New Zealand. The church is also noted for its progressive stance on many social issues.

=== Carrigafoyle ===
Carrigafoyle is a large private residence at 195 The Terrace. It was built in 1903 and is notable for its stained glass internal woodwork and fittings. Between 1919 and the 1970s it operated as a boarding house and then was restored in the 1980s. The building has a Historic Place Category 1 classification from Heritage New Zealand, which states that Carrigafoyle "stands as a splendid Edwardian example of a large family home in central Wellington".

=== Gordon Wilson Flats ===
Gordon Wilson Flats is an 11-storey block of flats at 320 The Terrace. The flats were completed in 1959 as social housing for lower-income people. In 2010 concerns were raised that the building was corroding and was an earthquake risk, and in 2012 tenants were given short notice to vacate the building. Victoria University bought the block from Housing New Zealand in 2014 with the intention of demolishing it, but this was opposed by the Architectural Centre. In February 2021, the flats were listed by Heritage New Zealand as a Historic Place Category 1, meaning that any plans to develop the site would need Environment Court approval. Demolition began in 2026.
