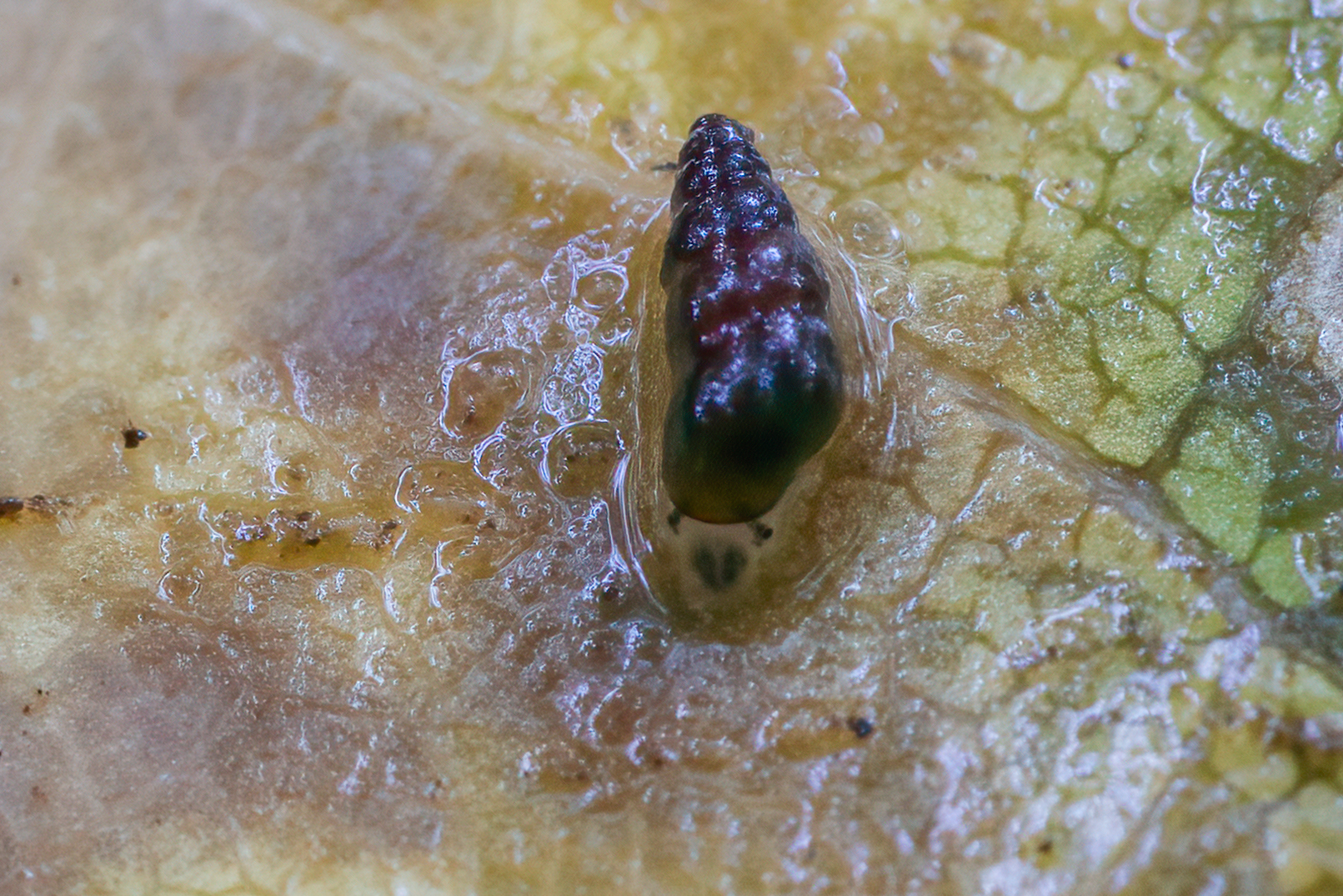

Conservation status
- Critically Endangered (IUCN 3.1)

- Nationally Critical (NZ TCS)

Scientific classification
- Kingdom: Animalia
- Phylum: Mollusca
- Class: Gastropoda
- Subclass: Caenogastropoda
- Order: Littorinimorpha
- Family: Tateidae
- Genus: Potamopyrgus
- Species: P. oppidanus

Binomial name
- Potamopyrgus oppidanus Haase, 2008

= Potamopyrgus oppidanus =

Species of gastropod

Potamopyrgus oppidanus is a species of freshwater gastropod mollusk in the family Tateidae. It is endemic to only one area in the Wellington Town Belt of New Zealand.

== Taxonomy ==
This species was first described by Martin Haase in 2008 using specimens collected in a stream in Wadestown in Wellington. The holotype specimen is held at the National Museum of New Zealand Te Papa Tongarewa.

== Description ==
This species is approximately 3 mm in length and just over 1 mm in width. The shell is light brown in colour and semi transparent. The colour of the mantle can be patchy and there are two black stripes on the head of the snail.

== Distribution ==
P. oppidanus is endemic to New Zealand and has only been found on Te Ahumairangi Hill in the town belt of Wellington. The species was first found in a fountain near Grant Road where it intersects with Wadestown Road. The stream near the fountain was subsequently rerouted into a manmade stream bed and the snails can no longer be found there.

== Habitat ==
P. oppidanus lives in damp shaded areas in undisturbed leaf litter, stones and woody detritus.

== Conservation status ==
This species has a "Nationally Critical" conservation status under the Department of Conservation threat classification system. It has been given that status as the total area of occupancy of this species is less than 1 ha (0.01 km2) and it is only found in one location.

P. oppidanus has also been classified by the International Union for Conservation of Nature (IUCN) as critically endangered. It has a decreasing population and is only found in one location. The IUCN considers P. oppidanus as under threat from residential and commercial development, ecosystem modification, decline and fragmentation, the possibility of fire and use of fire suppressants, as well as the possibility of pollution in the freshwater habitat of the species. The IUCN recommends that the known site and the surrounding vegetation be protected and that research be undertaken into the distribution of the species as well as life history and ecology as well as threats to the species.

A recent survey of the species indicates it is declining in population. It has been argued that the building of illegal mountain bike tracks through its habitat is having a detrimental effect on its survival. Tradescantia fluminensis is also contributing to this decline as the weed is smothering the snail habitat.
