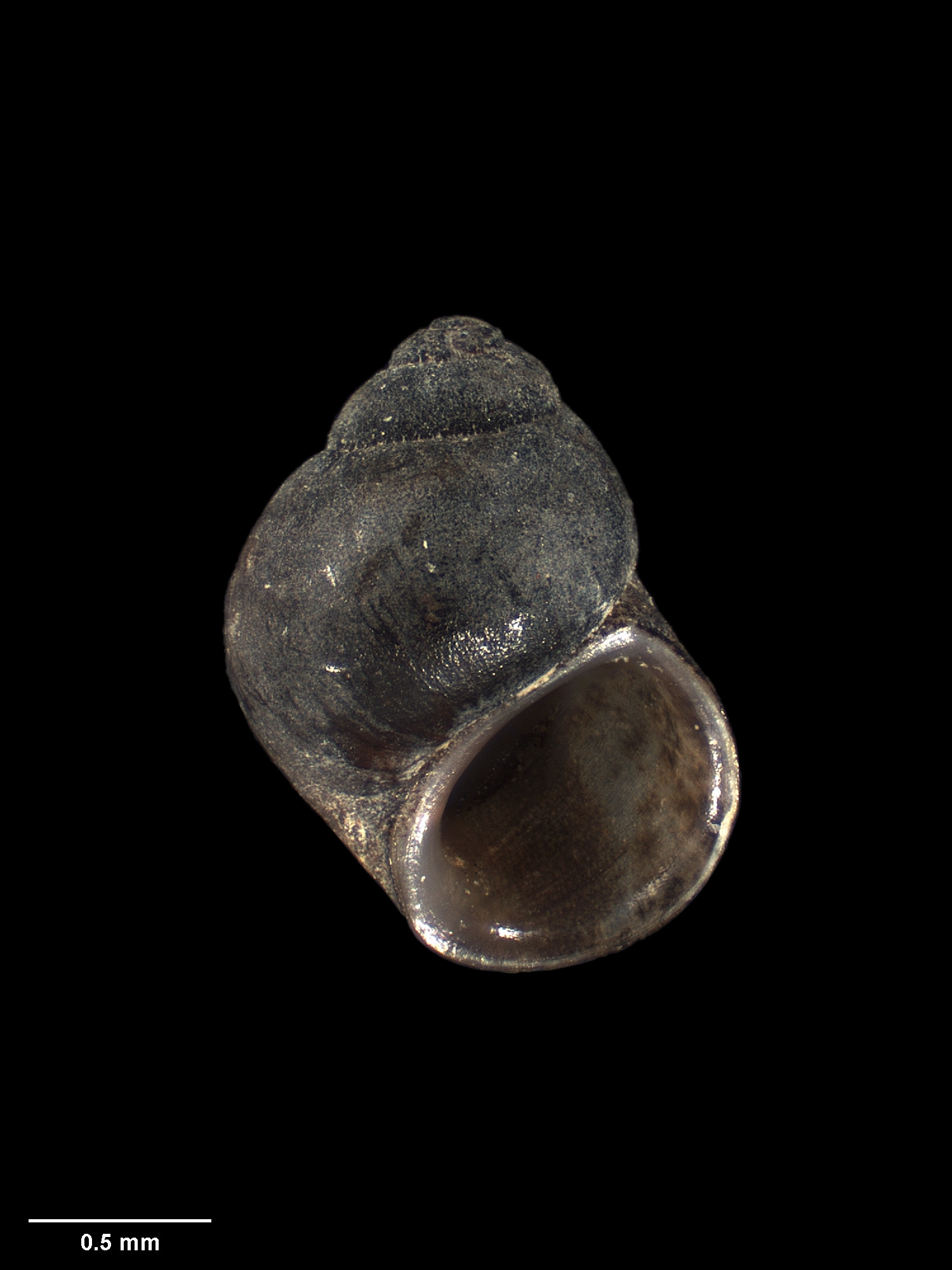
- Type specimen in the collections of Te Papa

Conservation status
- Nationally Critical (NZ TCS)

Scientific classification
- Kingdom: Animalia
- Phylum: Mollusca
- Class: Gastropoda
- Subclass: Caenogastropoda
- Order: Littorinimorpha
- Family: Tateidae
- Genus: Potamopyrgus
- Species: P. doci

Binomial name
- Potamopyrgus doci Martin Haase, 2008

Synonyms
- Hydrobiidae sp. 4 (M.174064)

= Potamopyrgus doci =

Species of gastropod

Potamopyrgus doci is a critically endangered species of fresh water snail native to New Zealand.

== Habitat ==
This snail has been found in only one location in a spring at the exit of Ruakuri Cave, in the Waitomo Caves, north west of Te Kūiti. This habitat is only a few square metres in size but is within a protected area. However, there is recreational rafting in the cave and agriculture upstream may result in a decline in water quality. Despite this the population trend is regarded as being stable.

== Conservation status ==
In 2013 the Department of Conservation classified Potamopyrgus doci as Nationally Critical under the New Zealand Threat Classification System. The species was judged as meeting the criteria for Nationally Critical threat status as a result of it occupying a total area of less than 1 hectare. It is found only in one location.
