= Wiremu Piti Pōmare =

Wiremu Piti Pōmare (? – 29 January 1851) was a chief of Ngāti Mutunga, a Māori iwi originally of Taranaki, then of the Wellington region, then the Chatham Islands, in New Zealand. He was often known as Pōmare Ngātata, taking the name Wiremu Piti when he was baptised a Christian in 1844.

Pōmare's birth date is not known; he was about 30 in 1834, according to information collected by Percy Smith. His parents' names are not known. He was closely related to Ngātata-i-te-rangi, a chief of Te Āti Awa. While he was young, Ngāti Mutunga lived in north Taranaki, with Te Āti Awa to their west and Ngāti Tama to their north.

In the early 1820s parts of Ngāti Mutunga and Ngāti Tama migrated with other Taranaki peoples and Ngāti Toa to the southern North Island. Pōmare was among the Ngāti Mutunga who migrated to Waikanae in about 1824, along with other Taranaki people, including Ngātata. Ngāti Mutunga moved on to Wellington Harbour a year later. Pōmare settled under Ngātata at Kumutoto Stream in present-day Wellington city. He married Tawhiti, a niece of Te Rauparaha of Ngāti Toa, and they had three children.

Ngāti Raukawa migrated from Maungatautari in the Waikato to the Kāpiti Coast in the late 1820s, and were welcomed by Te Rauparaha, whose mother was from their tribe. But they had been enemies of the tribes from northern Taranaki. They settled in the Horowhenua, as far south as the Ōtaki area, where they butted up against Te Āti Awa in the Waikanae area, which eventually led to war and the large battle of Haowhenua, between Te Horo and the Ōtaki River, in 1834. Both tribes looked to allies to aid them. Te Rauparaha's Ngāti Kimihia hapū of Ngāti Toa were among those who assisted his Ngāti Raukawa relatives, albeit reluctantly. Ngāti Mutunga went to the aid of Te Āti Awa and, when it looked like the Taranaki tribes would be defeated, so did the Ngāti Te Maunu hapū of Ngāti Toa – the mother of their chief Te Pēhi Kupe was from Ngāti Mutunga, and they were already at odds with Te Rauparaha's hapū for other reasons. Pōmare's brother Te Waka Tīwai was killed in the battle. After he was buried, Tawhiti's brothers dug up the grave, enraging Pōmare, who sent his wife back to her tribe, along with their two youngest children, keeping just the eldest child himself. Around this time he married Hera Waitaoro, daughter of Te Manu Toheroa (or Te Manu-tohe-roa) of the Puketapu hapū of Te Āti Awa.

Anxious about relations with Ngāti Toa after the battle of Haowhenua and Pōmare's marriage breakup, Ngāti Mutunga and Ngāti Tama (which had its own quarrels with Ngāti Toa) left Wellington and migrated to the Chatham Islands in 1835. The forced settlement of the archipelago resulted in significant violence, with much of the extant local population (the Moriori) killed or enslaved by the invaders. Pōmare became the leading Ngāti Mutunga chief about 1836–1837. He returned to Wellington in 1842 and was baptised by Octavius Hadfield at Waikanae on 7 April 1844, taking the Christian name Wiremu (Wi) Piti (a transliteration of William Pitt). He returned to the Chatham Islands and died there on 29 January 1851. He was succeeded as leader of Ngāti Mutunga by his nephew Wiremu Naera Pōmare.

== Bibliography ==
- Ballara, Angela (1990a). "Te Whanganui-a-Tara: phases of Maori occupation of Wellington Harbour, c. 1800–1840". In Hamer, David; Nicholls, Roberta (eds.). The Making of Wellington, 1800–1914. Victoria University Press.
- Ballara, Angela (1990b). "Wiremu Piti Pōmare". Dictionary of New Zealand Biography. Ministry for Culture and Heritage.
