= Acclimatisation societies in New Zealand =

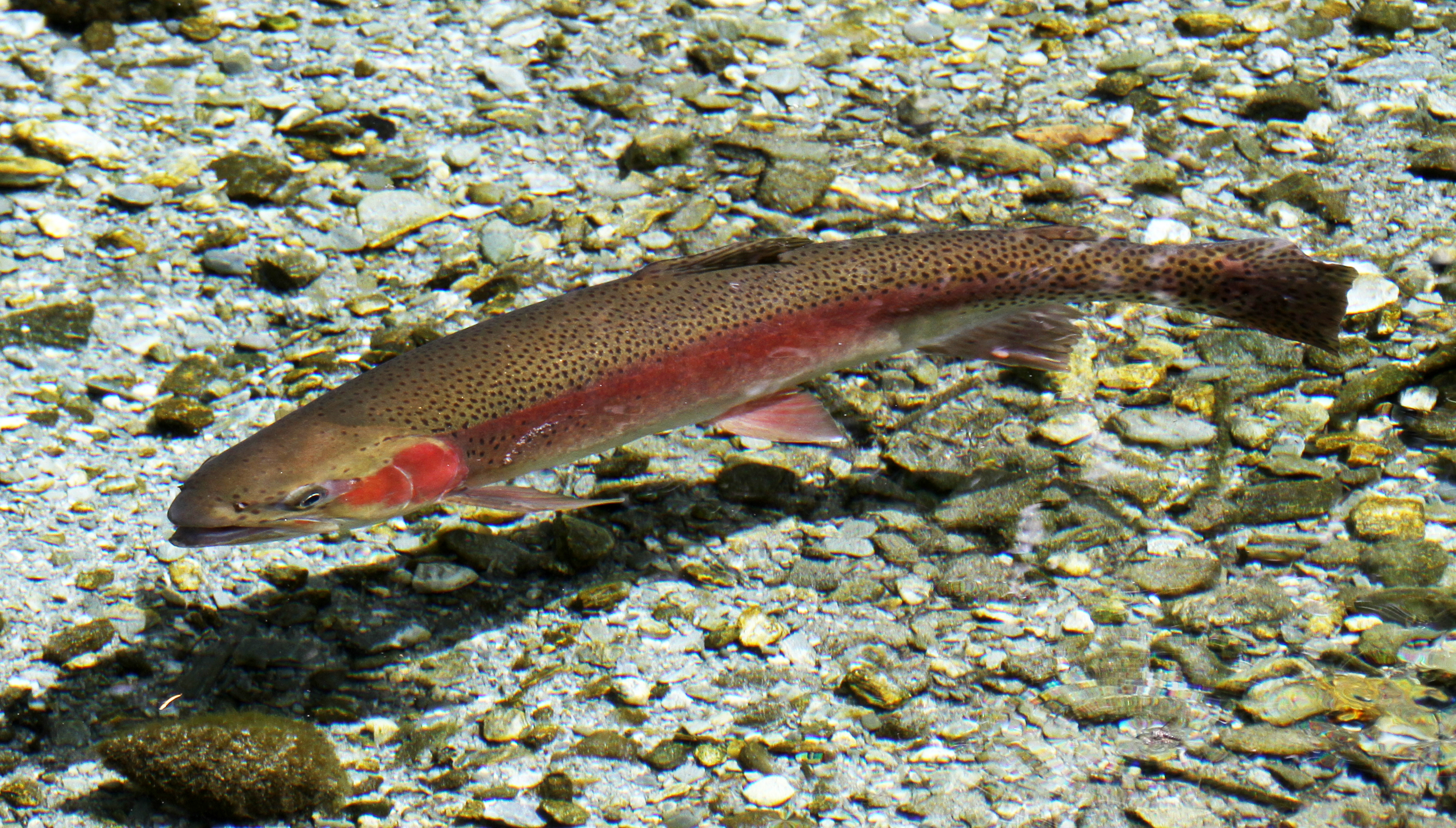
Rainbow trout, Boydtown, Otago

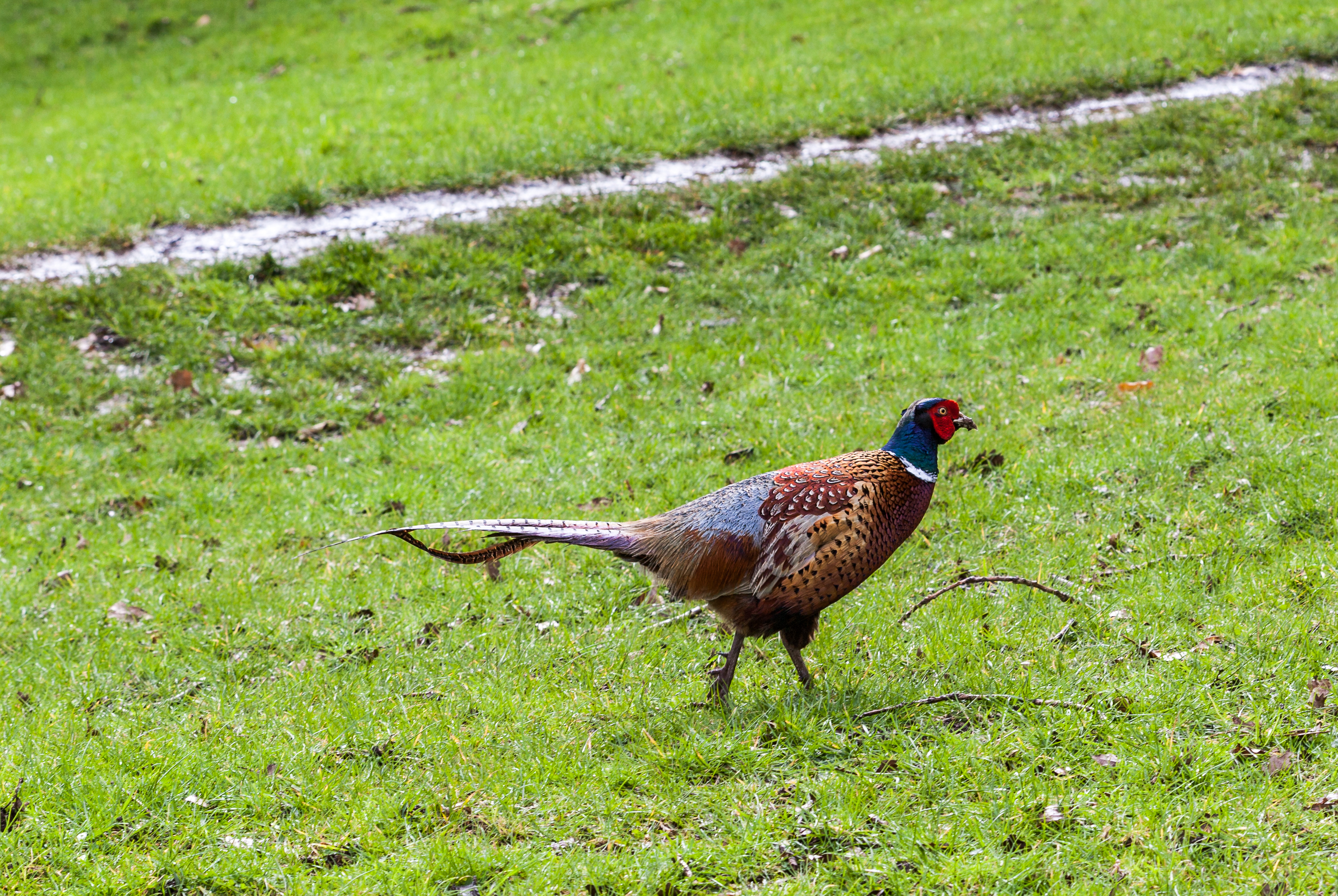
Pheasant, Epsom, Auckland

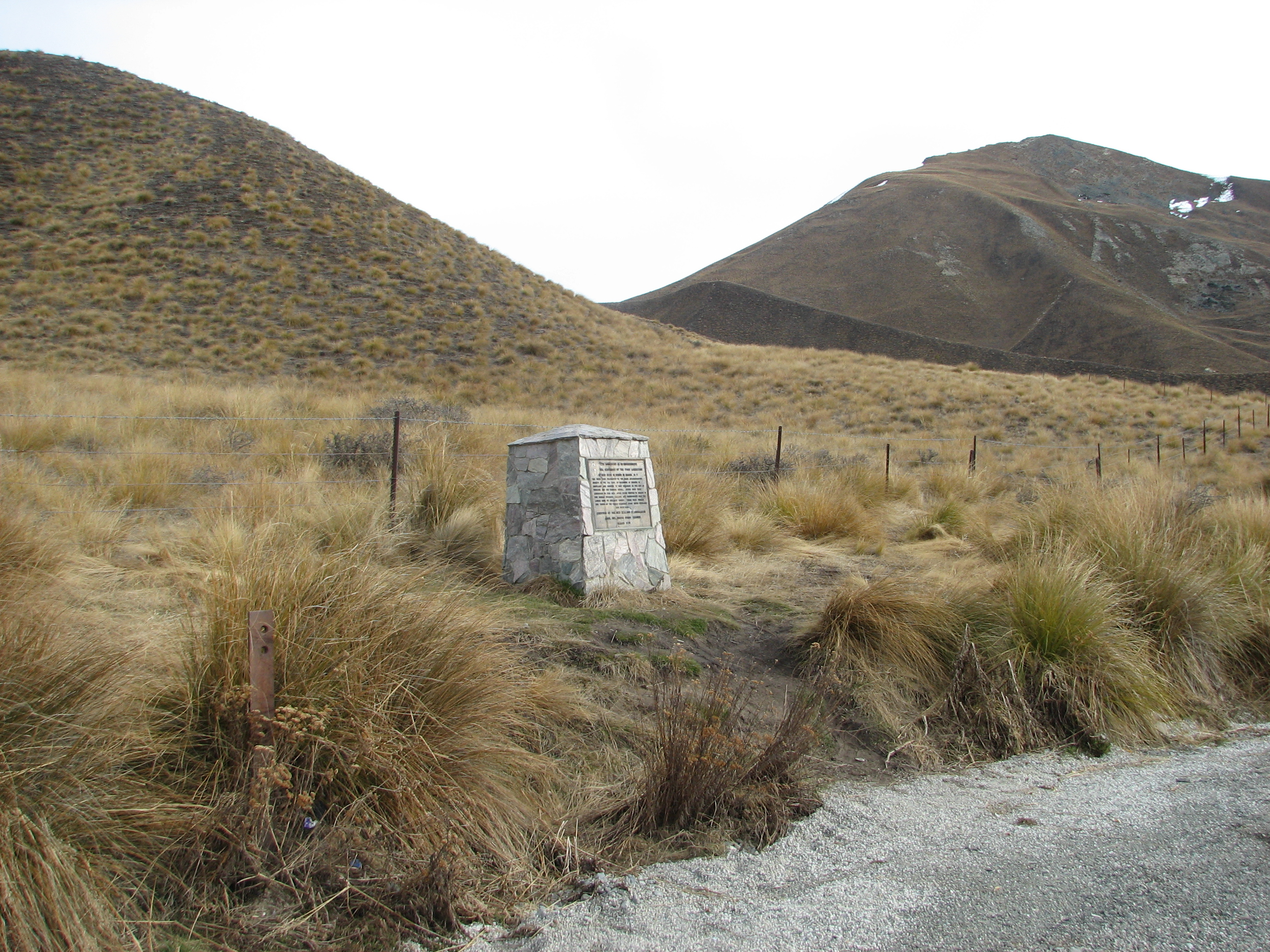
A roadside memorial erected in 1971 commemorating the centenary of the release of red deer by the Otago Acclimatisation Society

Acclimatisation societies to naturalise all kinds of new species —as long as they had no harmful effect— were established in New Zealand by European colonists from the 1860s, with the first likely having been established in Auckland around 1861.

The Otago Acclimatisation Society was operating by 1864. By 1869, it was receiving £500 per year from the Otago provincial government to bring in familiar British species, notably small birds, such as starlings, blackbirds, sparrows, chaffinches, of which populations thrive throughout the country today.

In 1867 the first of a series of Animal Protection Acts was passed to provide protection to many of the introduced animals and formally recognised the Acclimation Societies in New Zealand. Later that year the importation of trout and salmon was enabled by the passing of the Trout and Salmon Act.

Hawke's Bay Acclimatisation Society was formed in 1868, with land purchaser and politician, Donald McLean, as its first president.

Wellington's Acclimatisation Society got under way in May 1871 with 62 members. President A.Ludlam, vice presidents: Archdeacon Stock, Dr Hector, J. C. Crawford. Their first committee was: Hunter, Pearce, Krull, Laing, Bannatyne, Denton, Travers, G. Bennett, W. Levin and Dr Johnston. In October 1884 it was reconstituted under the Animals Protection Act 1880 having extended its membership and reconstituted itself as the Wellington and Wairarapa District Acclimatisation Society. Their annual report for 1885 asked that it be noted it was not responsible for the introduction of rabbits, that deer and hares had become numerous but pheasants and quail had been greatly decreased by the use of poisoned grain, the practice of poaching and the liberation of stoats, weasels and ferrets. The Society's income from shooting licences was much greater than from fishing licences, 16,700 fish had been liberated in the past year and if that continued the area's fishing might soon be the equal of anywhere else in New Zealand. It was also noted that unless settlers became more ready to prevent poaching birds would disappear very rapidly.

The Canterbury acclimatisation society was known for some more unusual introductions including the African Lion. Not only did they import animals, but they also exported them. For example, in 1872 the Whanganui society exported kiwi to Adelaide in exchange for rooks.

They received some financial assistance from government, for example £150 from the provincial government of Canterbury in 1867 and £300 from the national government in 1905.

== Affiliation ==
To "speak to the government with a united voice on any special subject" a formal association of acclimatisation societies was approved at their annual conference in Wellington in the summer of 1903 and given the name New Zealand Acclimatisation Society. The first president was J. B. Fisher of Canterbury.

== Fish and Game New Zealand ==
In 1990 they became regional fish and game councils – together, Fish and Game New Zealand.

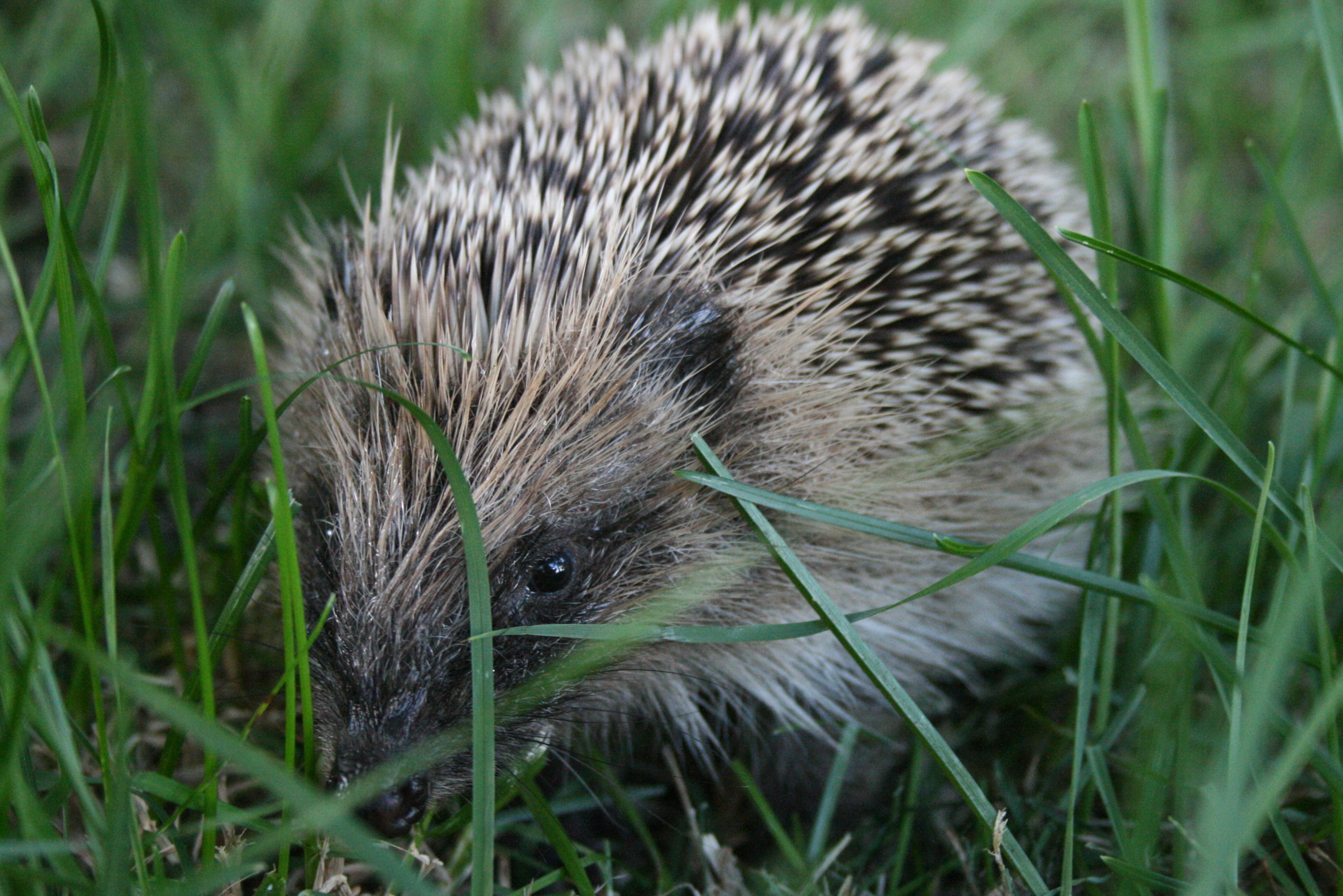
Hedgehog near Wānaka

== Species introductions ==
Introductions to New Zealand — by a variety of people and organisations — Notably include:

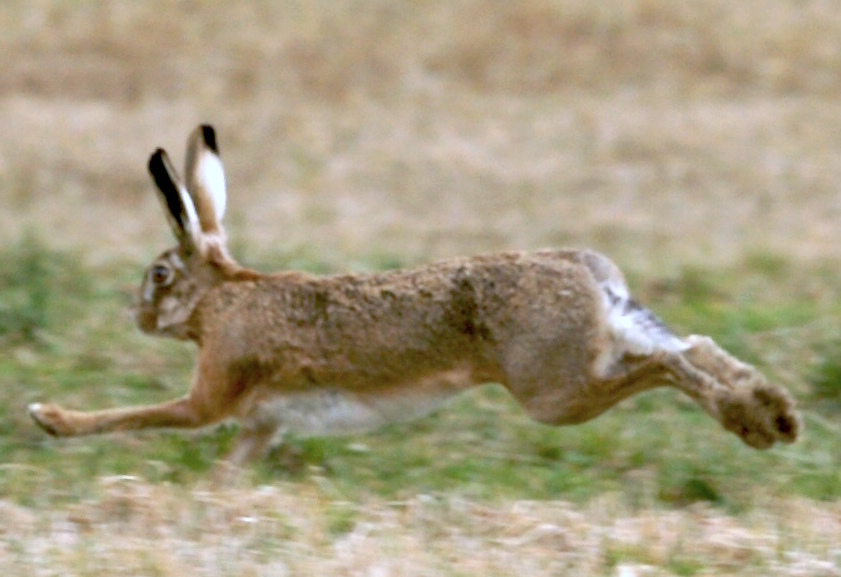
Hare, Lepus europaeus

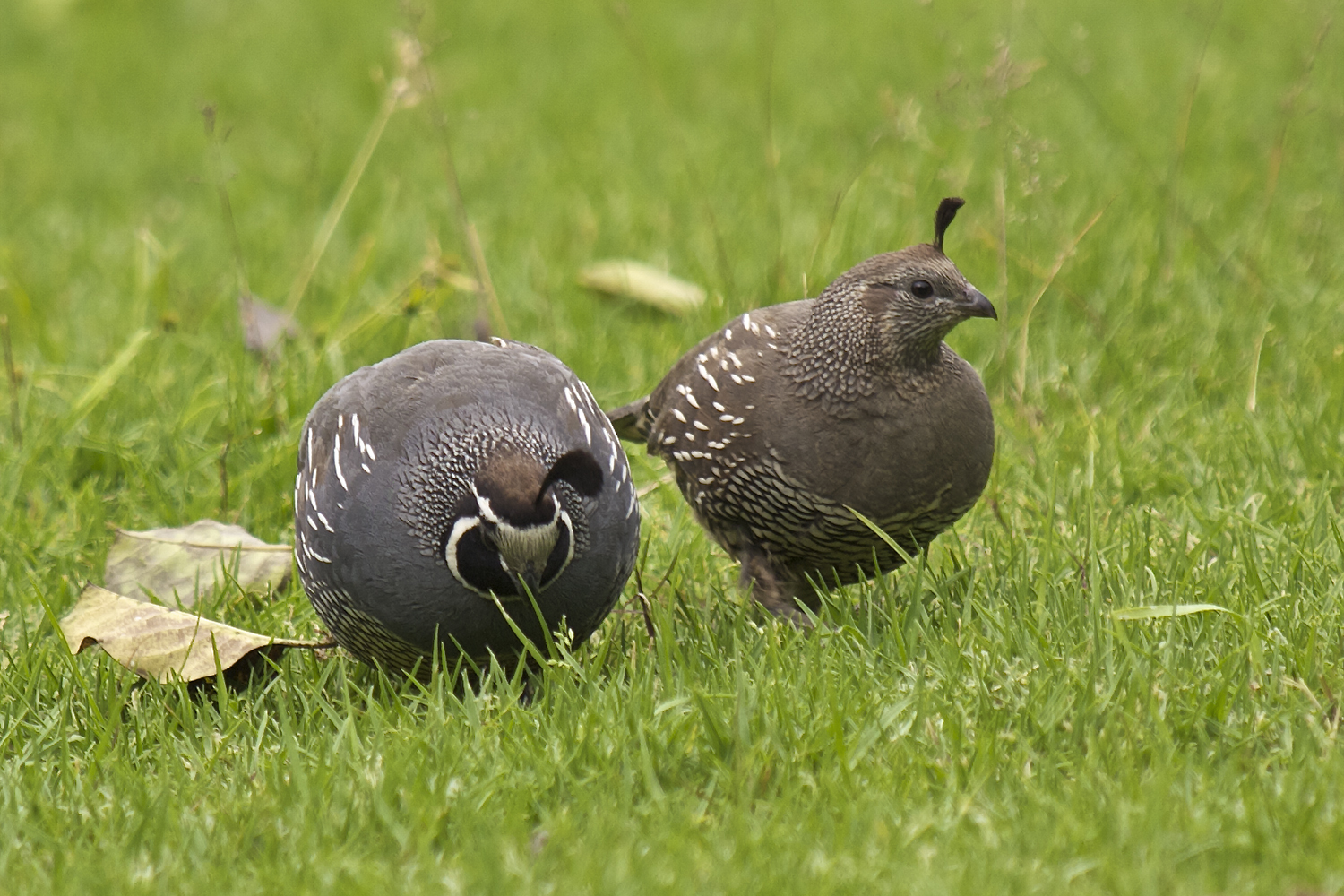
Quail (Callipepla californica)

- Brown trout
- Rainbow trout
- Deer
- Mallard ducks
- Canada geese
- Hare
- Wallaby
- Hedgehogs
- Brushtail Possum introduced beginning 1837 by settlers to start a fur industry
- Rabbit successfully introduced by settlers about 1852.
- Mustelids - Stoats, Ferrets and Weasels government and private imports to try to curb the rabbit menace particularly between 1883 and 1892 Clause 24 of the Rabbit Nuisance Act 1881 allowed "natural enemies of the rabbit" to be protected, which covered stoats, ferrets, weasels and polecats.

== See also ==
- Conservation in New Zealand
- European hedgehog in New Zealand
- Hunting in New Zealand
