= George Denton (naturalist) =

New Zealand settler (1833–1910)

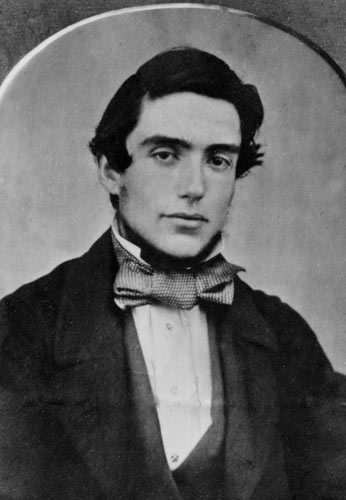
George Denton (year unknown)

George Denton (1833 – 10 August 1910) was a founding councillor of Wellington's Acclimatisation Society in May 1871. He was noted for his interest in Māori lore and friendships with Māori of his own generation.

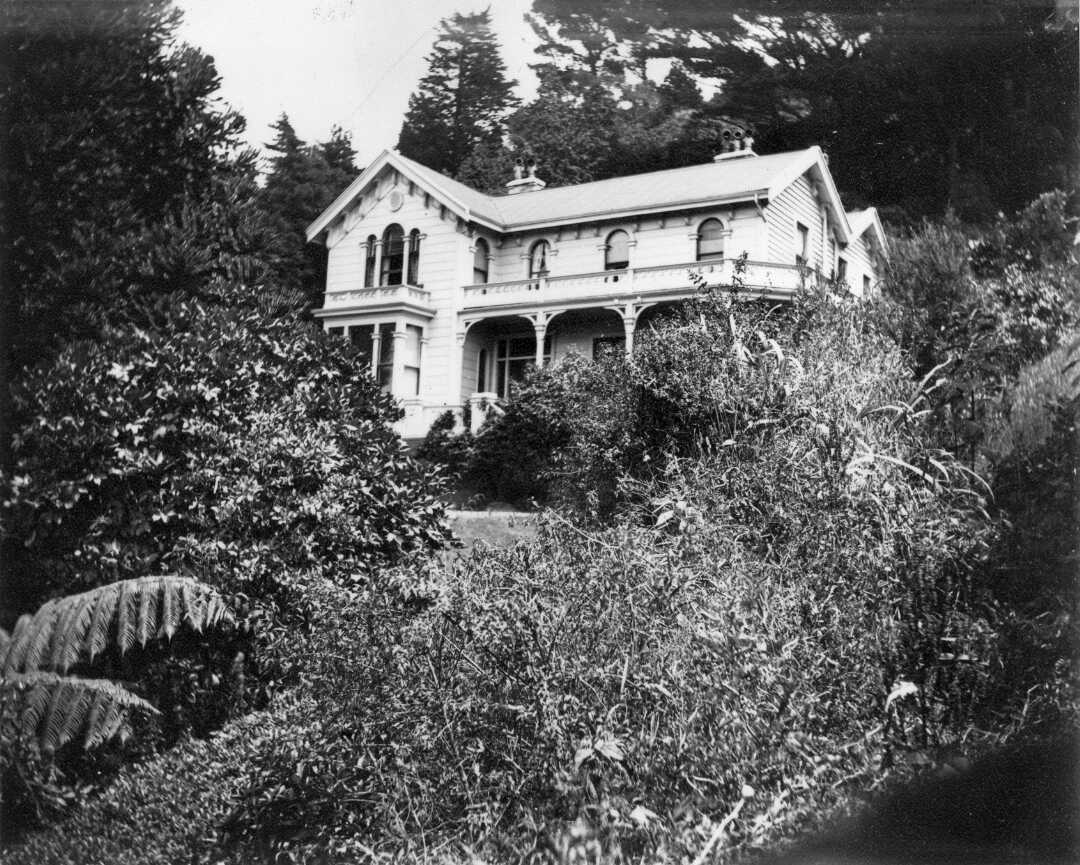
Fernhill seen from The Terrace

== Biography ==
Denton came to Wellington at the beginning of 1856 from Nelson where he had arrived from London on 17 January 1856 on the sailing ship China. His future wife, then Eliza Bennett, had arrived as a child in 1848. Denton sold ironmongery and sports equipment (tennis racquets, cricket bats, firearms, fishing tackle) and provided the services of watchmaker and jeweller from his shop at 58 Willis Street. (Note: Until 1908 it was 33 Willis Street. Re-numbering the city. The Evening Post. 24 September 1908. p.8) Storms at high tides could wash away stock on display in front of father-in-law George Bennett's shop at the junction with Lambton Quay.

George and Elizabeth Denton raised 11 children in their house called Fernhill in Woolcombe Street (324 The Terrace) opposite the top of Ghuznee Street. The 1-acre (0.40 ha) property backed onto the Town Belt. He grew nīkau there and gave away their carefully cultivated seedlings. Denton's hatchery near his house distributed some 5000 to 6000 hatchling trout around the lower North Island each year. A founder and stalwart of the Wellington Acclimatisation Society he also acclimatised and distributed the society's imported birds and maintained any maimed birds all in his own aviary. At the Acclimatisation Society he was assisted by Alexander Rutherfurd (1852–1931), 30 years an assistant and clerk assistant of the House of Representatives, of Masterton and Moroa Station, Alfredton.

Denton avoided involvement in public affairs. He died at his home in Woolcombe Street on 10 August 1910, and was buried in the Bolton Street Cemetery.

== Legacy ==
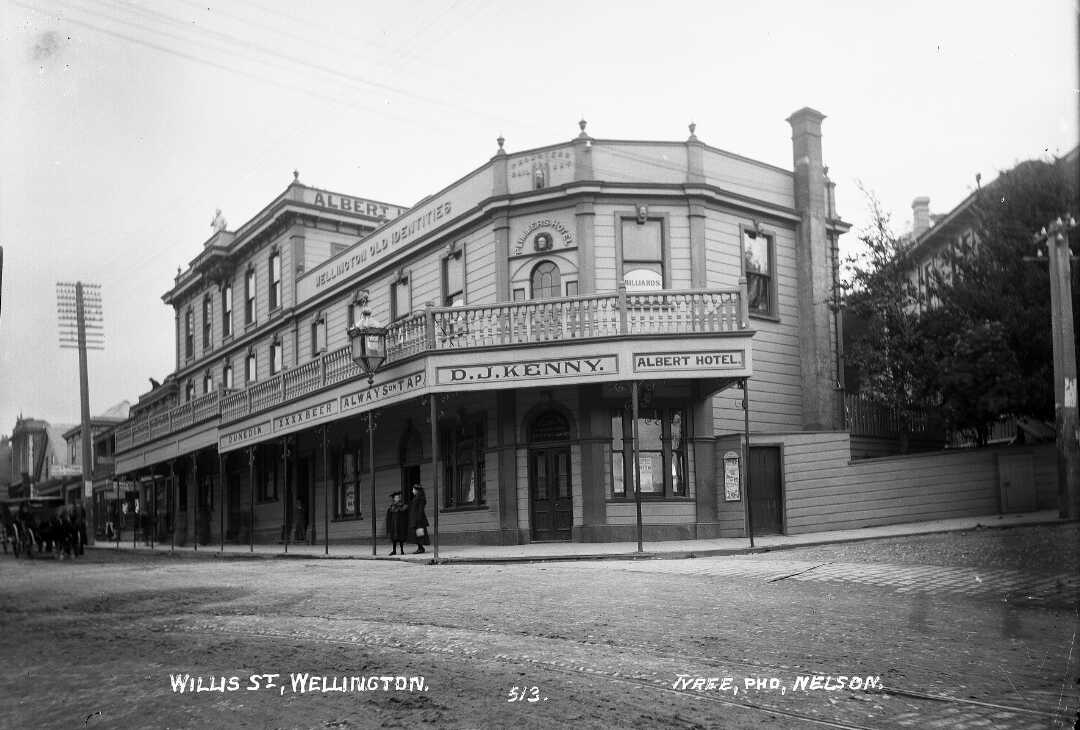
"Old Identities", on the corner of Willis and Boulcott Streets, c. 1900

A carving of Denton's head, made from tōtara, was one of those on the face of John Plimmer's 'Old Identities' hotel (properly named the Albert Hotel) on the corner of Willis Street and Boulcott Street. That building was demolished in 1929 and replaced by the St George. Denton's wooden head is now preserved in the Wellington Museum.

George Denton Park is approximately 37 acres (15 ha) of native bush given to Wellington City in 1951 by William Denton in memory of his parents, George and Eliza Denton. Now a part of Wellington Town Belt, it is sandwiched between Zealandia and Polhill Gully on a high ridge, far behind where the Dentons once lived.
