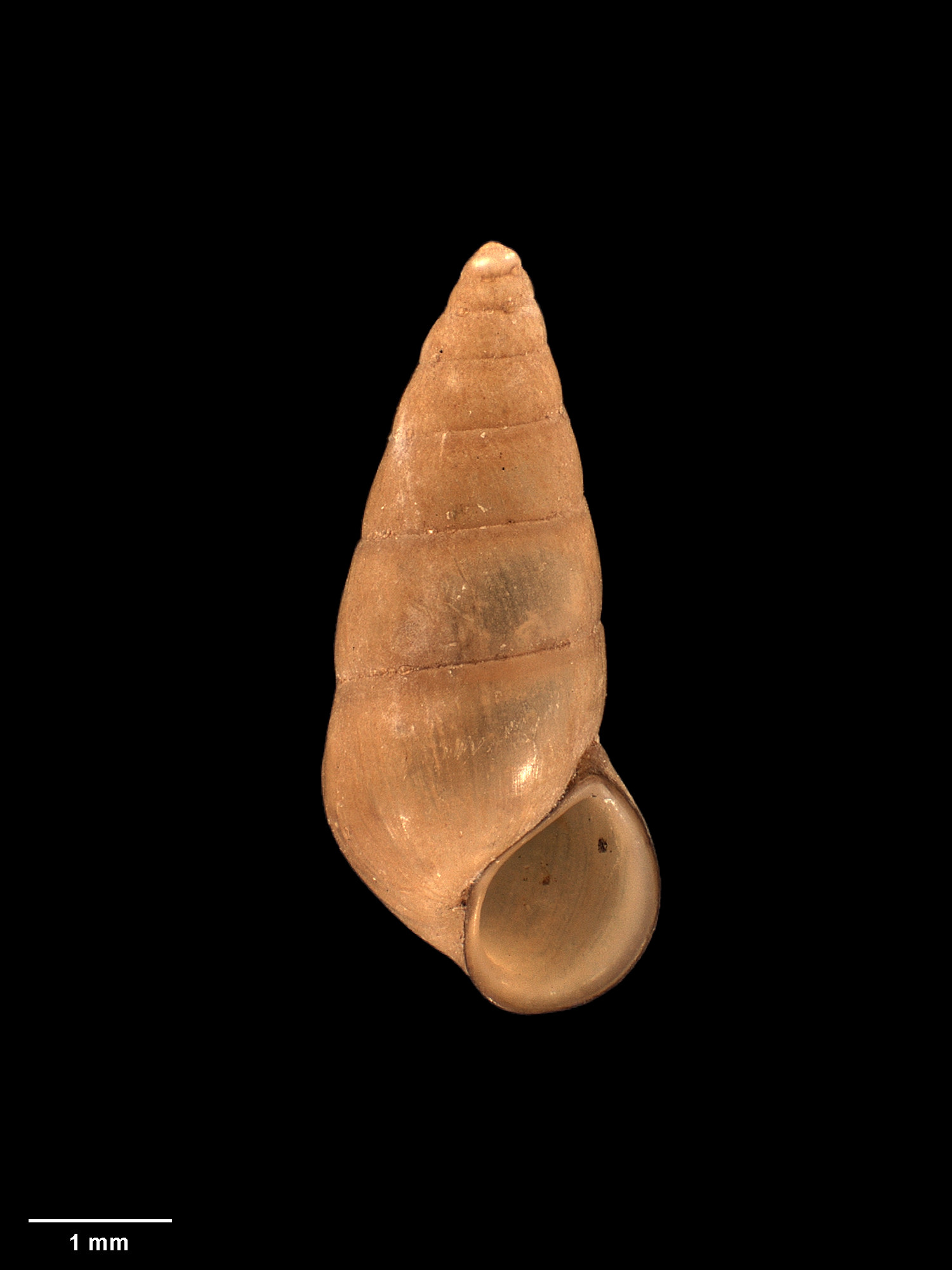
- Type specimen from the collections of Te Papa

Conservation status
- Nationally Critical (NZ TCS)

Scientific classification
- Kingdom: Animalia
- Phylum: Mollusca
- Class: Gastropoda
- Subclass: Caenogastropoda
- Order: Littorinimorpha
- Family: Tateidae
- Genus: Potamopyrgus
- Species: P. acus

Binomial name
- Potamopyrgus acus Martin Haase, 2008

Synonyms
- Hydrobiidae sp. 2 (M.174060)

= Potamopyrgus acus =

Species of gastropod

Potamopyrgus acus is a critically endangered species of fresh water snail native to New Zealand.

== Habitat ==
This snail has been found in only one location in a gully, on a very small and steep limestone bank, at Limestone Downs Station in the Waikato. This snail was first discovered in 1981 but several surveys in 2002 and 2003 has failed to find any further specimens. The area has been cleared for agriculture and is under threat of damage by cattle. It is possible that this snail is extinct.

== Conservation status ==
In November 2018 the Department of Conservation classified Potamopyrgus acus as Nationally Critical under the New Zealand Threat Classification System. The species was judged as meeting the criteria for Nationally Critical threat status as a result of it occupying a total area of less than 1 hectare. It is found only in one location.
