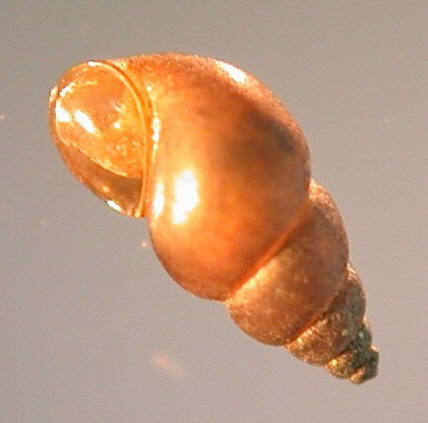
- Potamopyrgus antipodarum

Scientific classification
- Kingdom: Animalia
- Phylum: Mollusca
- Class: Gastropoda
- Subclass: Caenogastropoda
- Order: Littorinimorpha
- Family: Tateidae
- Genus: Potamopyrgus; Stimpson, 1865

Species
- See text

= Potamopyrgus =

Genus of gastropods

Potamopyrgus is a genus of minute freshwater snails with an operculum, aquatic gastropod molluscs or micromolluscs in the family Tateidae.

== Description ==
Stimpson (1865) described the genus as follows: “Shell ovate-conic, imperforate; apex acute; whorls coronated with spines; outer whorl nearly two-thirds the length of the shell; aperture ovate, outer lip acute. Operculum corneous, subspiral. Foot rather short for the length of the shell, broadest in front and strongly auriculated. Tentacles very long, slender, and tapering. Eyes on very prominent tubercles. Rostrum of moderate size.”

== Distribution ==
This genus is endemic to New Zealand and south eastern Australia.

However, one species within this genus, P. antipodarum, has been accidentally introduced in many countries worldwide, especially in Europe and North America, and has become a problematic invasive species.

== Species ==
Species within the genus Potamopyrgus include:

- Potamopyrgus acus Haase, 2008
- Potamopyrgus alexenkoae Anistratenko in Anistratenko & Stadnichenko, 1995
- Potamopyrgus antipodarum J. E. Gray, 1843 - (syn. Potamopyrgus jenkinsi)
- Potamopyrgus ciliatus (Gould, 1850)
- Potamopyrgus corolla (Gould 1852) (Type species)
- Potamopyrgus dawbini Powell, 1955
- Potamopyrgus doci Haase, 2008
- Potamopyrgus estuarinus Winterbourn, 1970
- Potamopyrgus kaitunaparaoa Haase, 2008
- Potamopyrgus melvilli Hedley, 1916
- Potamopyrgus oppidanus Haase, 2008
- Potamopyrgus oscitans Iredale, 1944
- Potamopyrgus polistchuki Anistratenko, 1991
- Potamopyrgus pupoides Hutton, 1882
- Potamopyrgus troglodytes Climo, 1974

Species brought into synonymy

- Potamopyrgus amazonicus Haas, 1949: synonym of Dyris amazonicus (Haas, 1949)
- Potamopyrgus brevior Ancey, 1905: synonym of Fluviopupa brevior (Ancey, 1905)
- Potamopyrgus cresswelli Climo, F. M., 1974: synonym of Rakiurapyrgus cresswelli (Climo, 1974)
- Potamopyrgus gardneri Climo, 1974: synonym of Rakipyrgus gardneri (Climo, 1974)
- Potamopyrgus jenkinsi E. A. Smith, 1889: synonym of Potamopyrgus antipodarum J.E. Gray, 1843
- Potamopyrgus manneringi Climo, 1974: synonym of Leptopyrgus manneringi (Climo, 1974)
- Potamopyrgus ruppiae Hedley, 1912: synonym of Ascorhis victoriae Tenison-Woods, 1878
- Potamopyrgus subterraneus Suter, 1905: synonym of Tongapyrgus subterraneus (Suter, 1905)
