= Wellington Town Belt =

Wilderness space in Wellington, New Zealand

Coordinates: 41.27851°S 174.76793°E

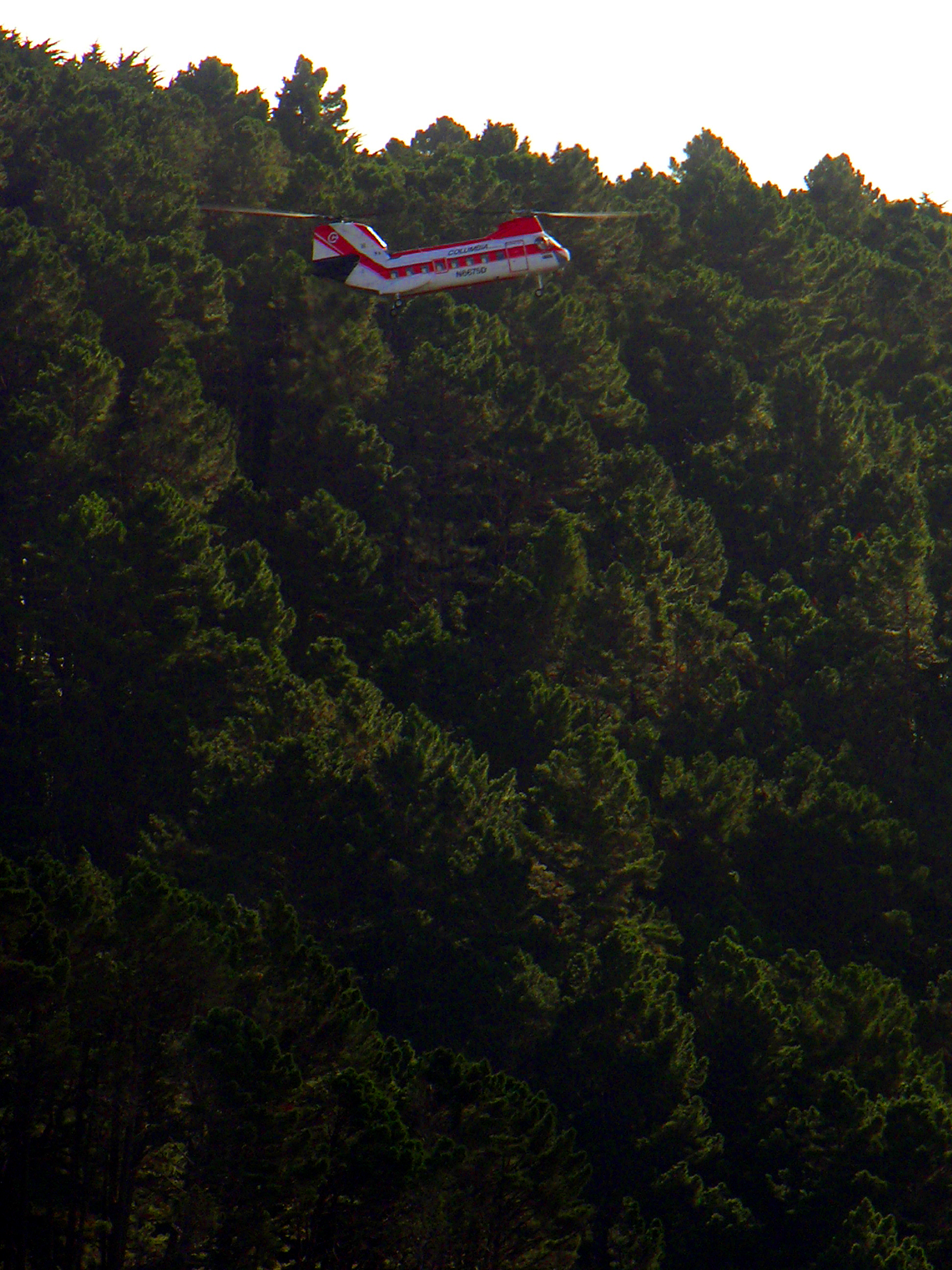
Removing wind-thrown logs Tinakori Hill or Te Ahumairangi Hill

Wellington town belt and Outer green belt is a pair of strips of tree-filled wilderness spaces near and around central Wellington, New Zealand's capital city. The inner strip, the town belt, is an elongated U-shape. It was set aside by the city's founders in 1840. It is now about two-thirds of its original area. Portions have been repurposed for various mostly-public purposes, including Wellington Hospital, Victoria University of Wellington, Government House, Wellington Zoo, Wellington College, the Wellington Botanic Garden, and a range of other parks and recreational areas.

== New Zealand Company ==
At the time of British settlement of Wellington immigrants came from areas with overcrowded cities and it was seen to be important that all citizens should have access to green spaces. The New Zealand Company instructed its surveyor to include "a broad belt of land, which you will declare that the Company intends to be public property, on condition that no buildings ever be erected upon it". The initial space set aside covered 625 hectares but by the year 2000 it had fallen to 425 hectares. It is owned by Wellington City Council.

== Reserves within the inner belt ==
Private gifts:

- Stellin Memorial Park, Northland on Te Ahumairangi Hill
- George Denton Park and playground, Highbury adjoining Zealandia

- Te Ahumairangi Hill, above Thorndon
- Polhill Reserve, Brooklyn adjoining Zealandia
- Tanera Park, Brooklyn
- Central Park, Brooklyn
- Mount Albert, above Melrose
- Mount Alfred, above Hataitai
- Mount Victoria

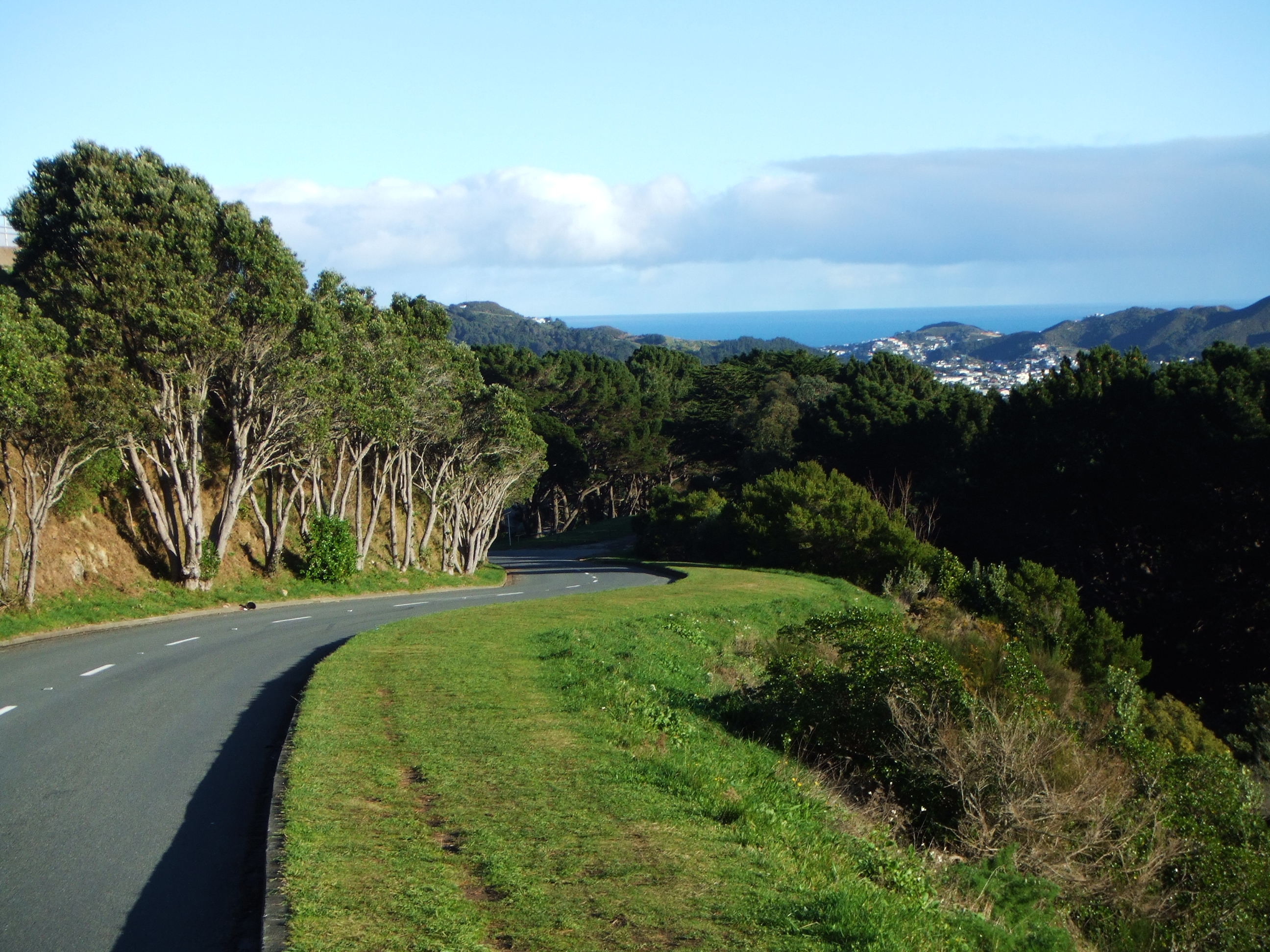
Overview

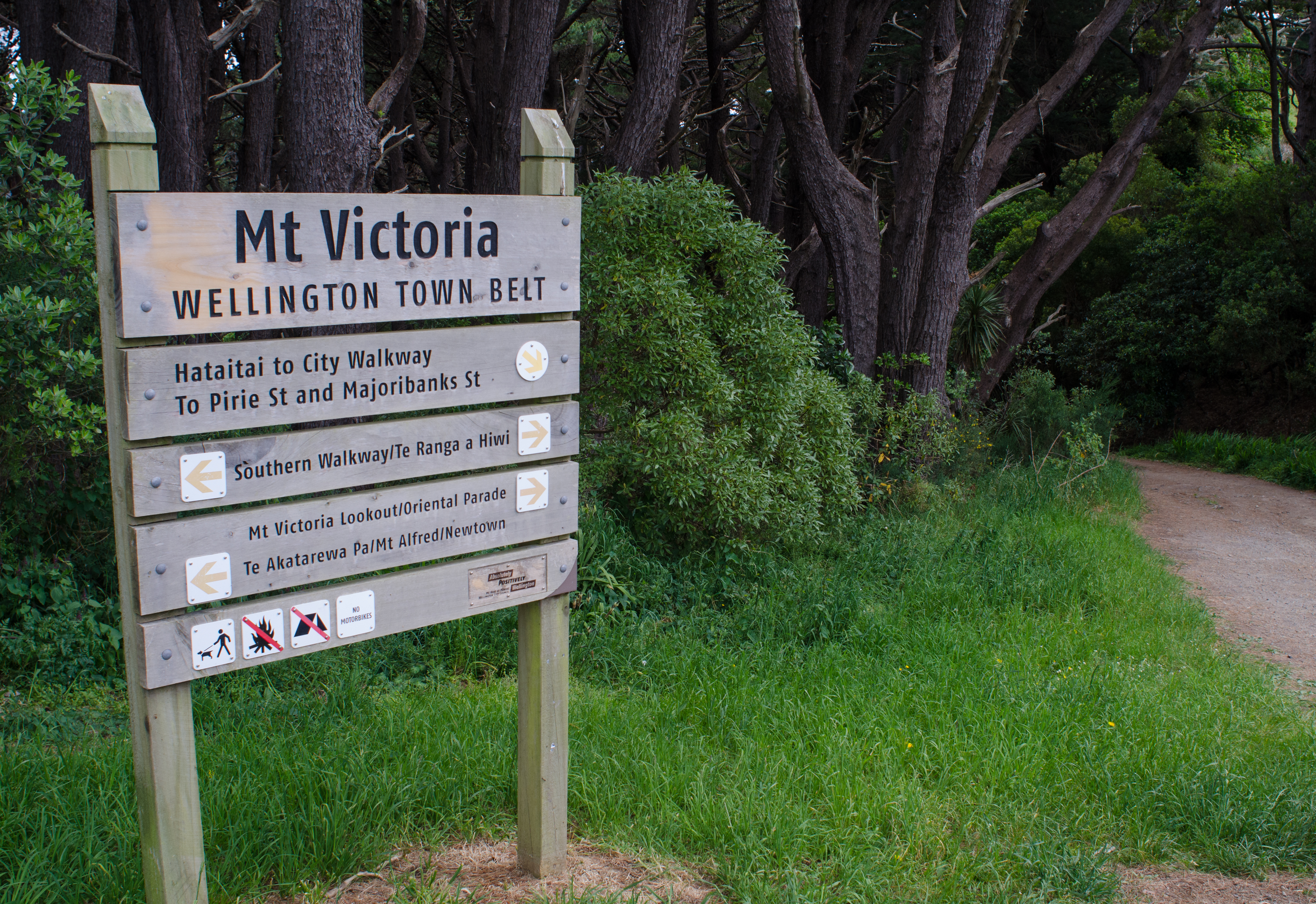
Entrance to a walkway

The strip runs from Mount Victoria south to Mount Albert, which is between Berhampore and Island Bay, and then north to Te Ahumairangi Hill or Tinakori Hill.

== Outer green belt ==
The outer strip of some 5,000 hectares includes some private land. It was first proposed in 1976 to protect the skyline, wildlife and remaining native forest. Some sites included are:

- Wrights Hill Fortress
- Makara Peak Mountain Bike Park
- Mount Kaukau

In 2018, Wellington City Council purchased the 268 Ohariu Valley Rd property adding much of the ridge line overlooking Churton Park to the Outer Green Belt
