= Wi Tako Ngātata =

Te Āti Awa leader, peacemaker, politician (1815–1887)

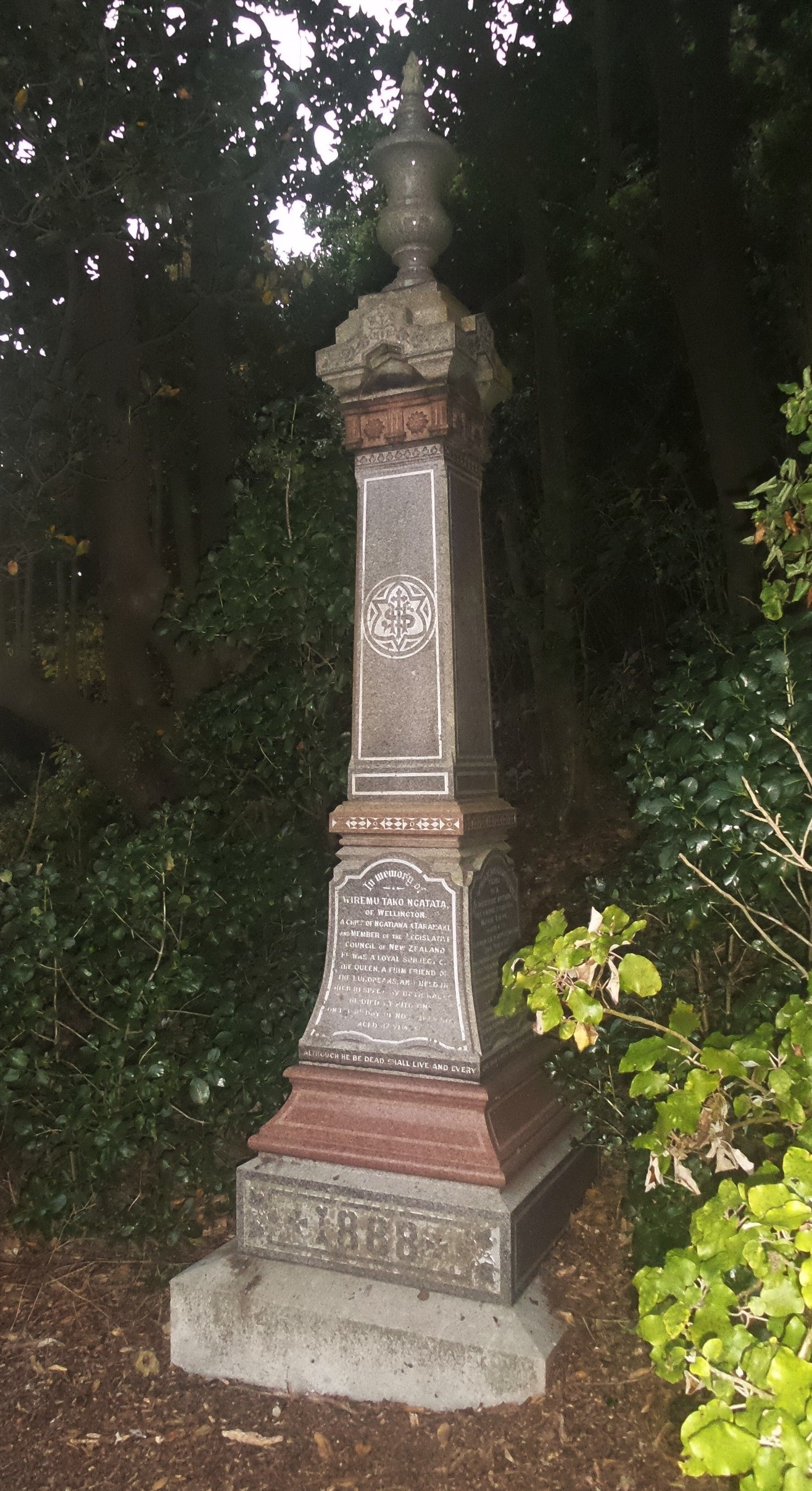
Wi Tako Ngātata memorial at the old Korokoro Cemetery

Wiremu Tako Ngātata (1815 – 8 November 1887) was a New Zealand Te Āti Awa leader, peacemaker and politician.

Wi Tako's father signed the Treaty of Waitangi in April 1840. That decade, Wi Tako was also involved in the early settling of Wellington, making many deals with the New Zealand Company.

He was appointed to the New Zealand Legislative Council on 11 October 1872; he was (with Mōkena Kōhere) one of the first two Māori to become a member. He served on the Legislative Council until his death on 8 November 1887. Later in his life Wi Tako converted to Roman Catholicism.
