= Whitmore Street =

Street in Wellington, New Zealand

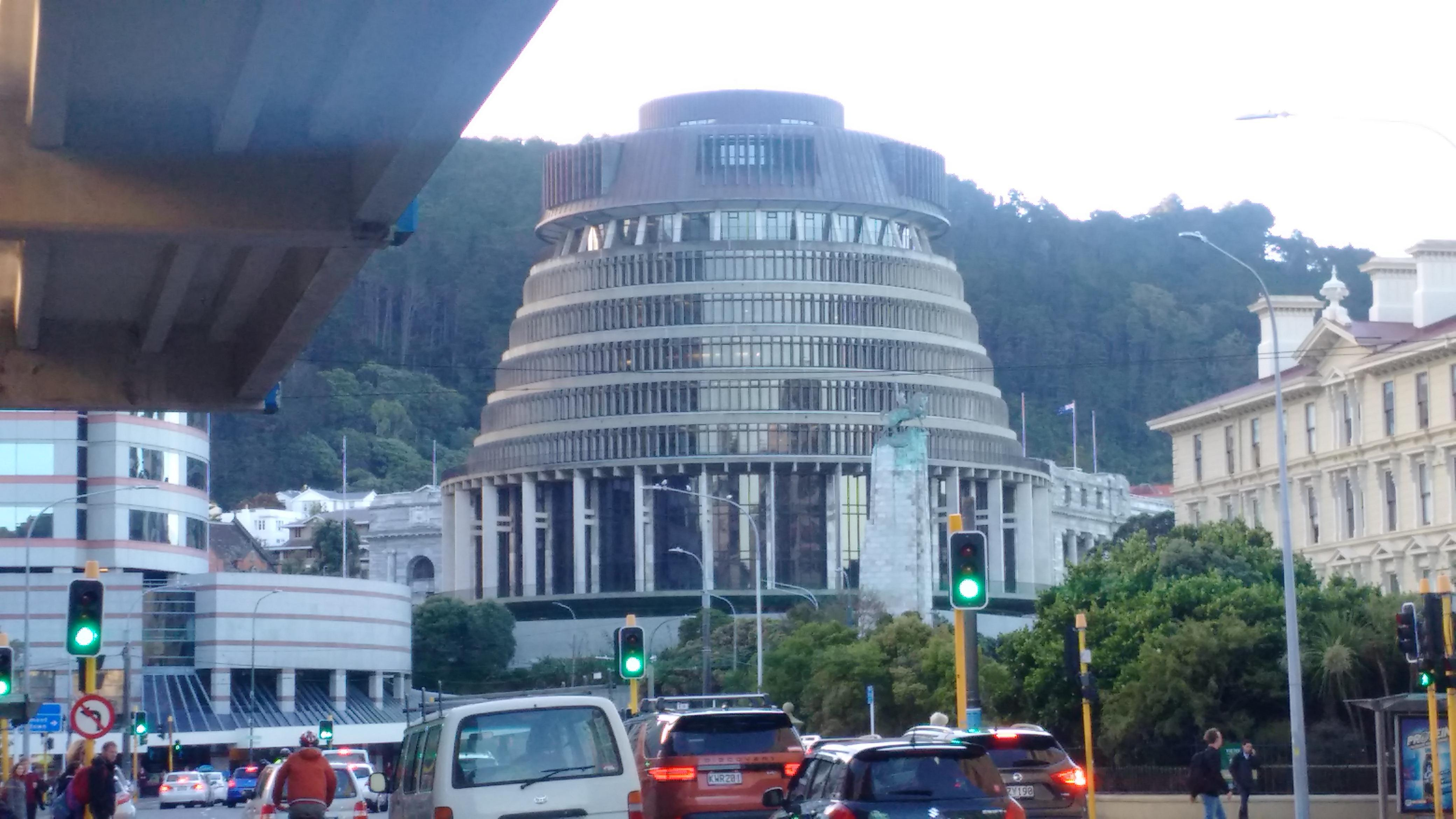
- The Beehive from Whitmore Street. This end of the street was closed from 1918 to 1969.
- Interactive map of Whitmore Street
- Maintained by: Wellington City Council
- Length: 300 m (980 ft)
- Location: Pipitea, Wellington
- Coordinates: 41.2804°S 174.7777°E
- South end: Customhouse/Waterloo Quay
- North end: Lambton Quay

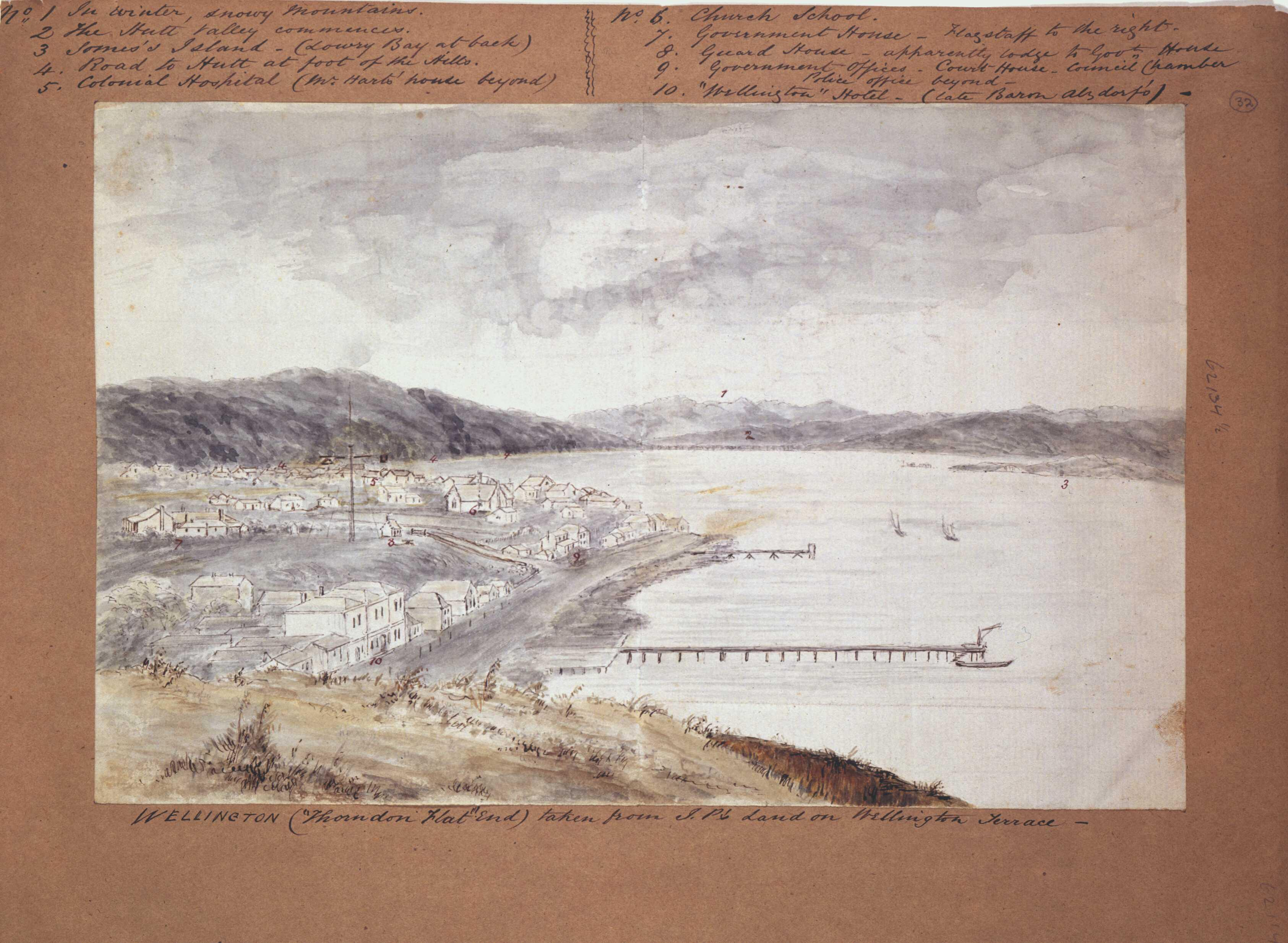
Lambton Quay and Thorndon c.1852 from the Terrace. The wharf in the foreground is believed to run out between present-day Whitmore and Ballance Streets

Whitmore Street is at the boundary of the central business district and the government buildings area of Wellington, New Zealand's capital. The street runs almost north-south and is one of those linking Lambton Quay, Wellington's main shopping street, with Stout Street, Featherston Street and the harbourside at Customhouse/ Waterloo Quay. It is in the suburb of Pipitea.

Most of the buildings do not have their main entrance on Whitmore St and the largest two are in brutalist style, but the northern part of the street is in the Stout St heritage area. Trees were added to the street in 1899 and three pohutukawas are now listed as heritage trees. Asphalt chambers were added in 1897, footpaths in 1904 and the street first had mechanised paving laid in 1939. The view down Whitmore St is protected as a viewshaft.

All the streets in the area, except Customhouse/Waterloo Quay have had a 30 km/h (19 mph) speed limit since 19 July 2020.

In 2017 over 13,000 pedestrians a day were on Whitmore St and up to 41,000 crossed it, mostly to and from the railway station, some 4,180 of them in the morning peak. Average daily traffic was about 17,800 vehicles a day. Between 2012 and 2017 there were 25 crashes, but from 2000 to 2022 there were 47 crashes at the junction with Lambton Quay, 20 at Stout St, 53 at Featherston St and 35 at Waterloo Quay. In 2018 changes were made to remove 7 car parks to improve traffic flow and safety and in 2021 crossing times for pedestrians were improved. In 2016 a light pole fell across the street, possibly due to earthquake damage.

== Name ==
An 1875 map shows the street name as that of the first Speaker of the New Zealand House of Representatives, Clifford. However, by 1878 the street had been named after another politician, the Colonial Secretary, Colonel George Stoddart Whitmore, who was much involved in negotiations about the land. Whitmore was knighted in 1882 for what one newspaper described as, "his gallant conduct in the Maori war". However that conduct was controversial at the time, and Waitangi Tribunal reports suggest that, in retaliation for alleged sheep stealing from his Hawke's Bay station, he led Napier Military District Defence Force to attack Pai Mārire at Omarunui in 1866, killing 21, or 23, wounding about 30 and taking 58 prisoners. He went on to raid Ngāti Hineuru, who had claimed ownership of some of his land. Whitmore represented Wairoa on the Hawke's Bay Provincial Council from 10 April 1867 until 29 May 1869. In July and August 1868 he pursued Te Kooti inland from Poverty Bay and was promoted to colonel on 21 October 1868. He was defeated by Tītokowaru at Moturoa on 7 November, but took Te Kooti's stronghold of Ngātapa on 5 January 1869 with great slaughter. His last campaign was invasion of Te Urewera, from 4 to 18 May. Whitmore was eased out of the army in July 1869. There are other Whitmore Streets in Kihikihi, Gisborne and Christchurch.

Other streets in the area, such as Molesworth, were named after supporters of the New Zealand Company and English politician, William Wolryche-Whitmore, was one of them. However, the nearby streets formed in 1879 were, like Whitmore St, named after contemporary politicians, Ballance, Featherston and Stout.

== History ==
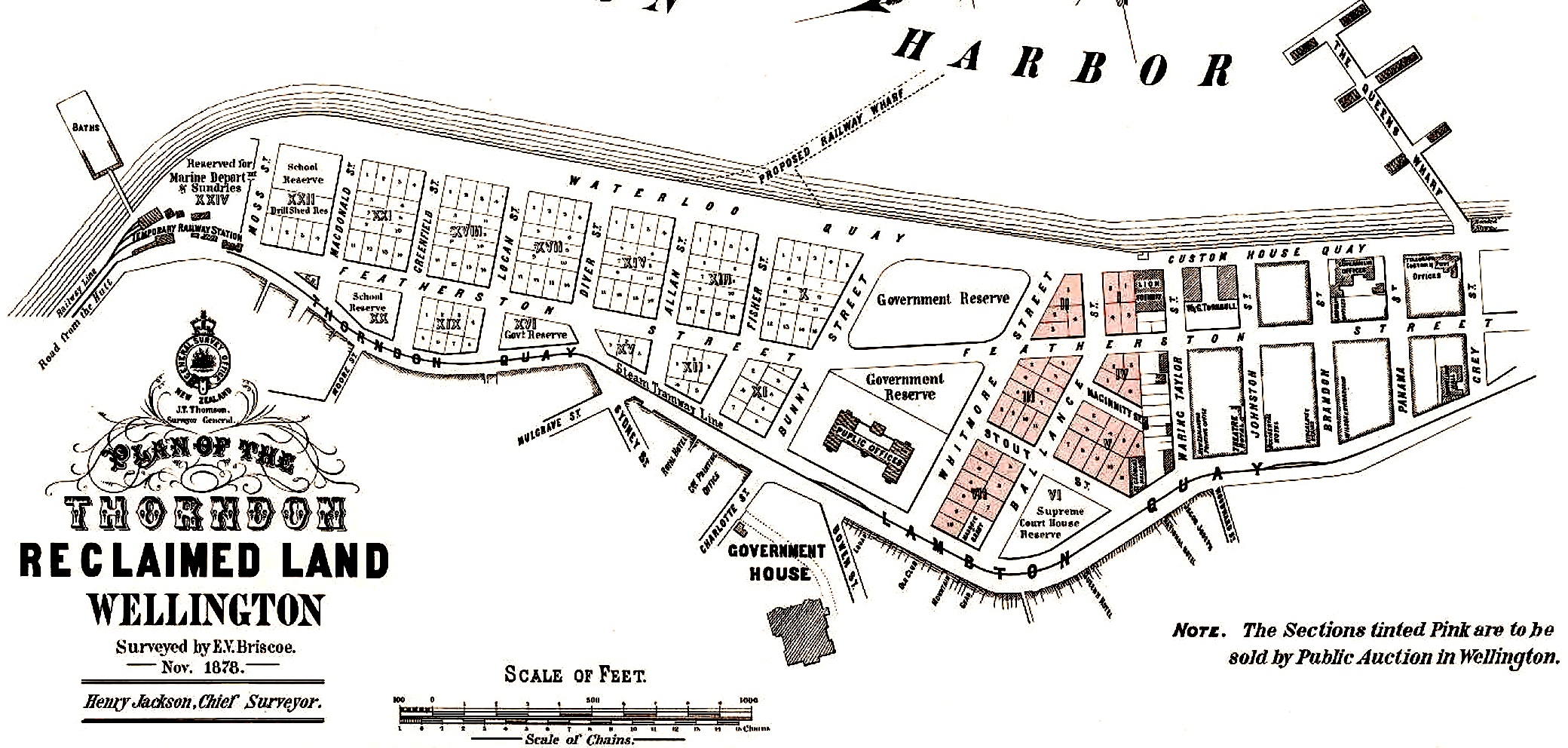
Map of 1875–78 reclamation

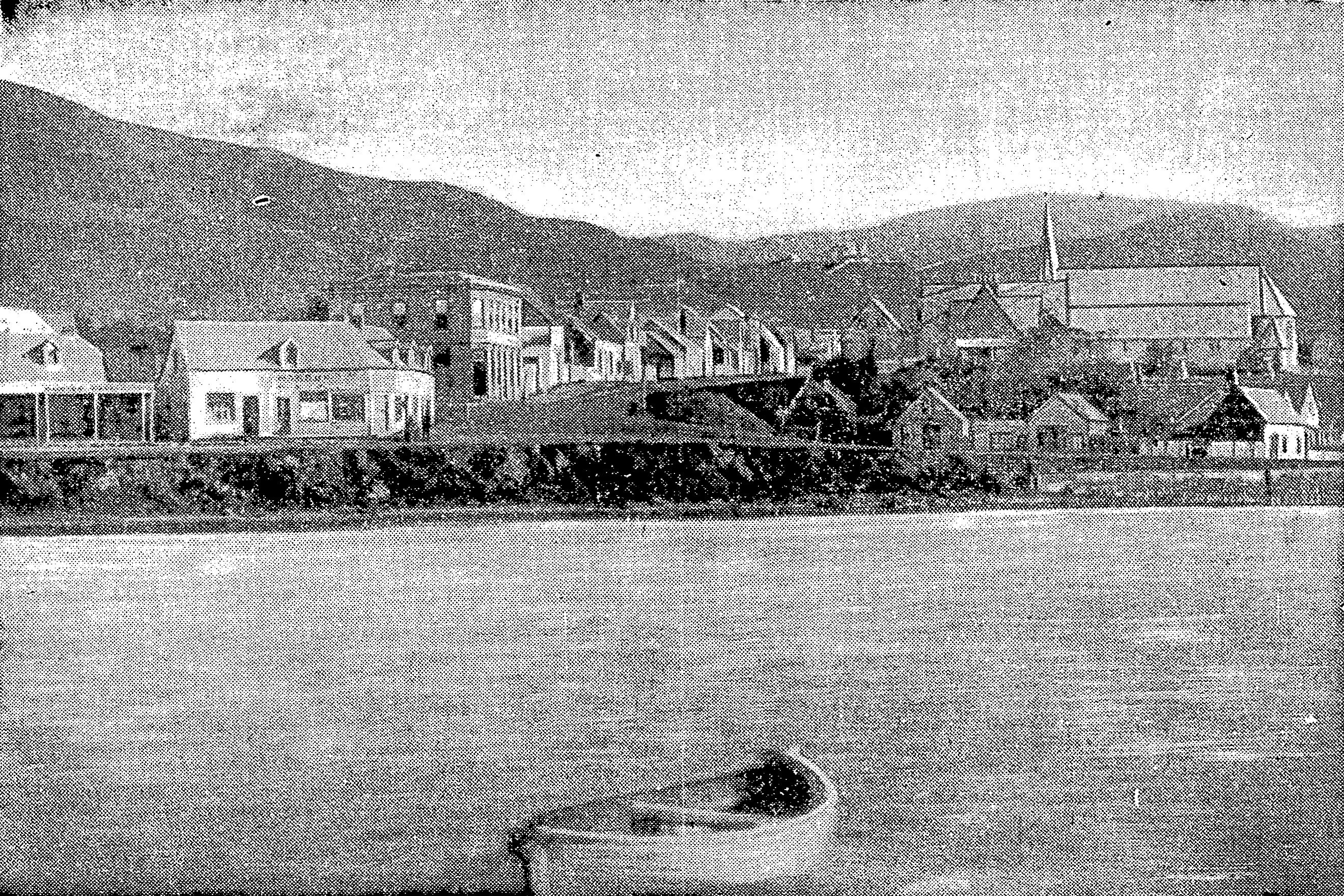
Mulgrave Street in 1866. In the next decade the harbour was filled in.

Whitmore St was part of Wellington Harbour until 1875, it was blocked by a Defence Department building from 1919 to 1969 and has had many other changes. It was close to a busy hub, opposite the entrance to the ferry wharf, which had up to 5,000 passengers a day, as well as having the activity of government administration at the other end.

In 1930 Whitmore Street had tram lines laid between Featherston Street and Customhouse Quay, when the route was diverted from Ballance Street.

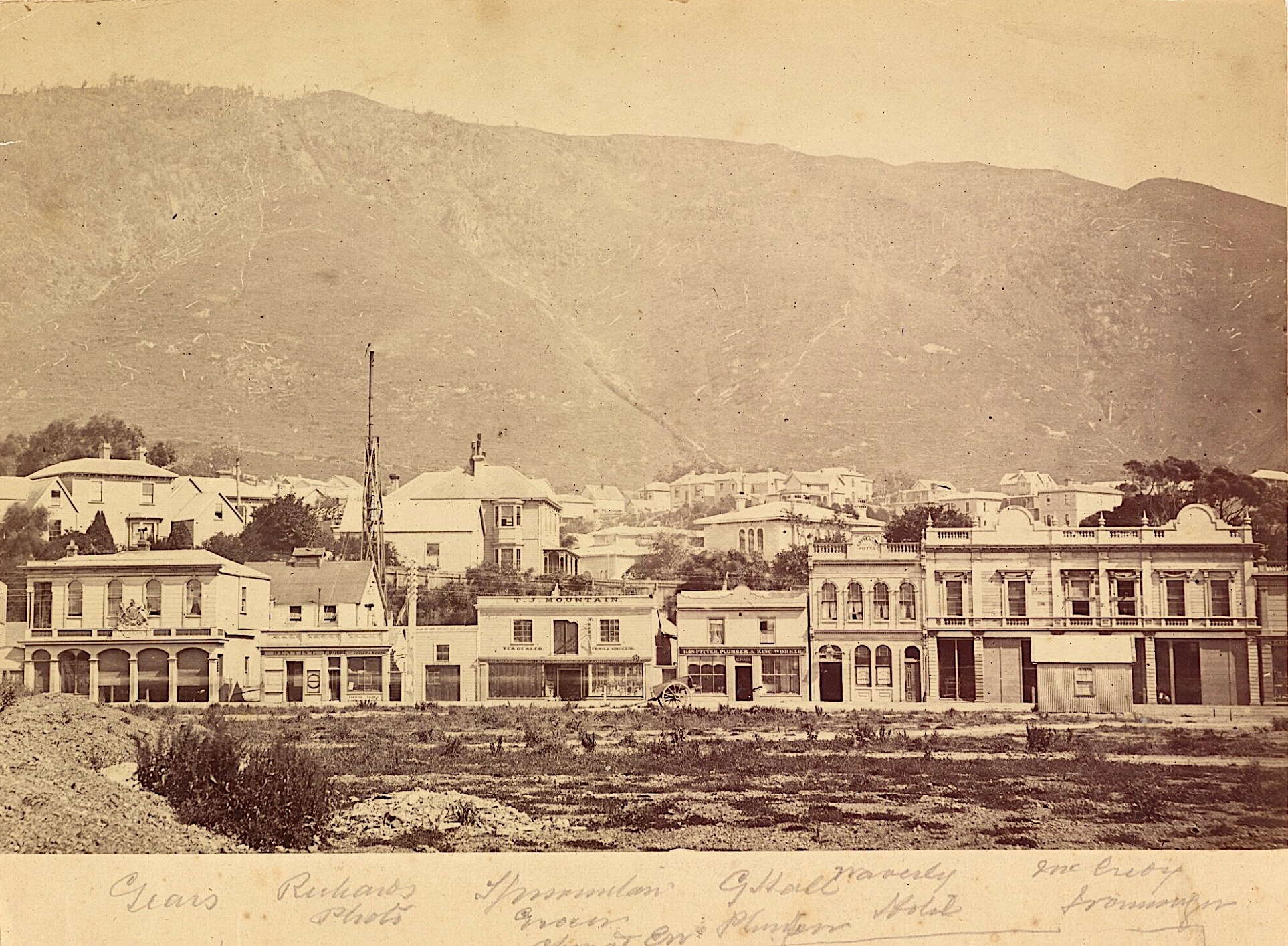
Lambton Quay about 1880, showing the reclamation where Whitmore St was about to be built

=== Thorndon Reclamations ===
The building up of over 155 ha (380 acres) from the harbour bed has been done in several stages, beginning in 1852, when the New Munster province sought tenders and 3 roods 6 1/2 perches (about 3/4 acre (0.30 ha)) were reclaimed, in an area now bounded by Willis St, Chews Lane, Victoria St and Mercer St. Whitmore St was the seventh reclamation, built up from the beach between 1875 and 1878, and some of the reclaimed land, including the west side of Whitmore St, was sold in 1878.

Tenders were called for reclamation of 13 acres (5.3 ha) in 1865. A sea wall was built with Western Australian Jarrah wood and finished early in 1875. Filling started on 2 April 1875, material being brought from nearby hills, especially from a hill by the Hutt road close to Pipitea Point, and by railway from places between Pipitea Point and Kaiwharawhara. The last load of fill was tipped on 6 December 1878. The street was built in 1879. A sale in 1879, for £99,144.16s of 4.25 acres (1.72 ha) on Lambton Quay, Featherston, Ballance, Stout, Maginnity and Whitmore Streets, approximated to the cost of the whole 42 acres (17 ha), or 46 acres (19 ha), of reclamation. The Ministry of Public Works planned to use the profits for railway building.

=== Old Government Buildings ===
Many of the main government institutions are near Whitmore Street. The 1876 Old Government Buildings by William H Clayton are at the north end of the street, on an 1875 reclamation of about 2.5 acres (1.0 ha), and the 1981 Beehive is across Lambton Quay.

=== Courts ===
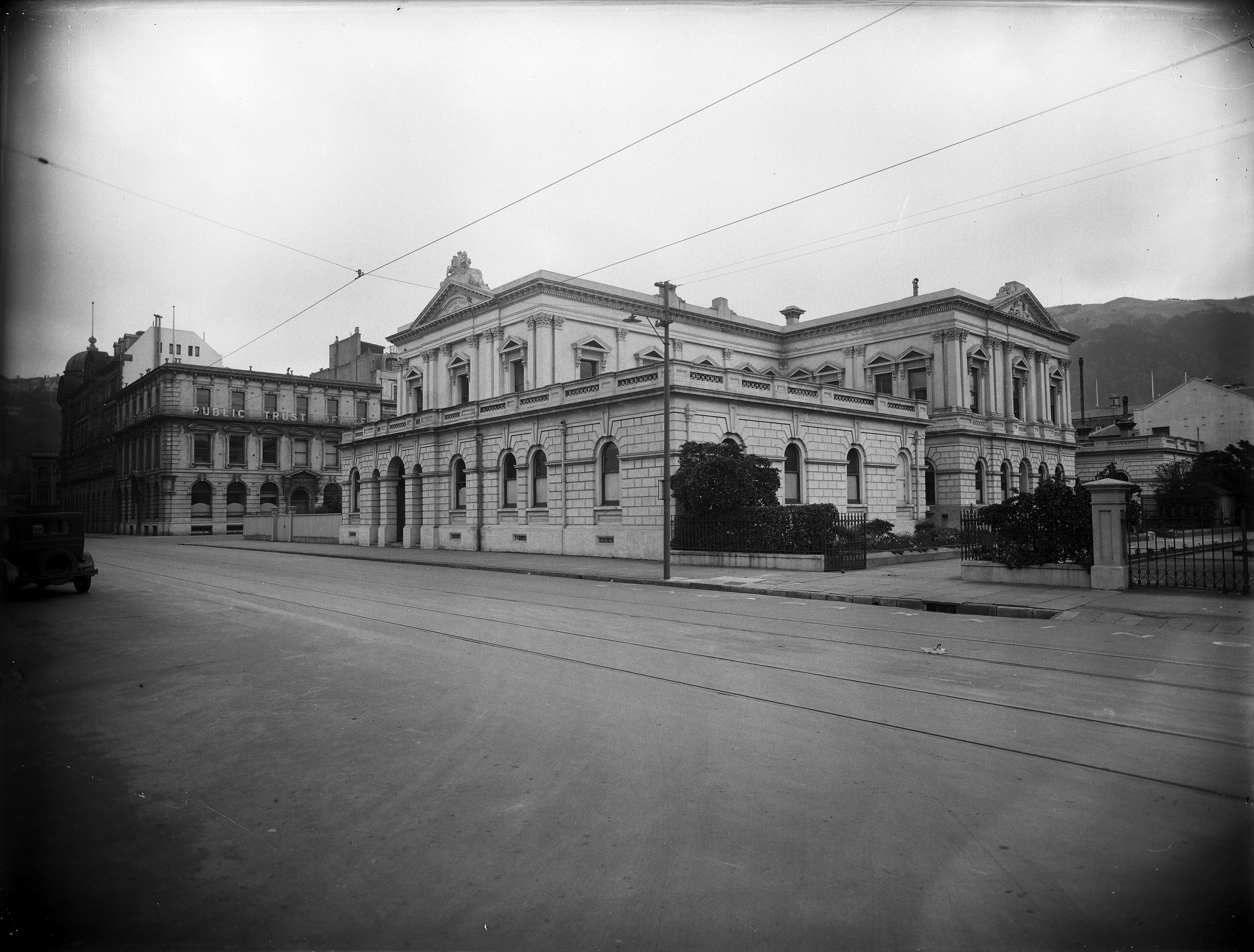
Supreme Court and Public Trust Office, 1920s

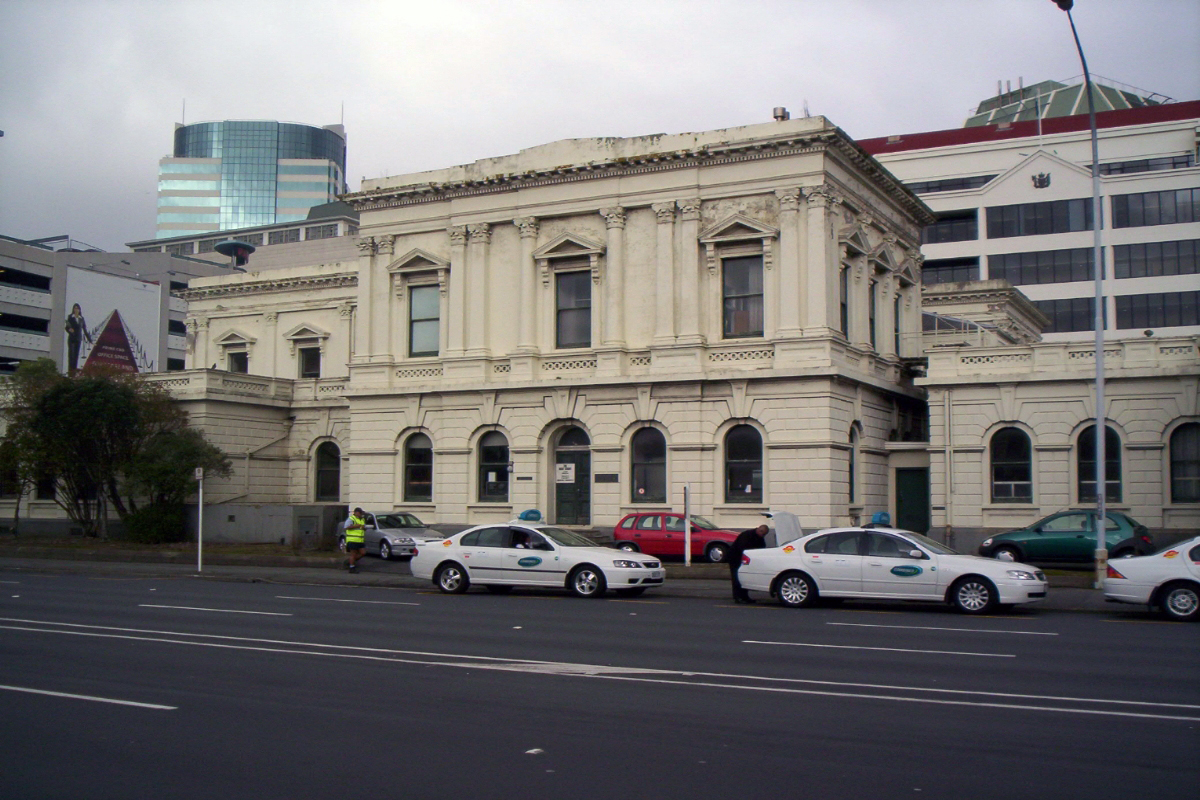
2006 when it was the Old High Court

Across Whitmore St from the Old Government Buildings are the courts. The 2009 Supreme Court by Warren & Mahoney fronts onto Lambton Quay, Whitmore and Ballance Streets. Prince William opened the new Supreme Court on 18 January 2009. It was built on Justice Park, 11 pōhutukawa being moved from there to the new Cog Park. The court is on piles 20 m (66 ft) deep and it is surrounded by a bronze sun-protection screen, with red glass, representing intertwined pōhutukawa and rata.

The 1881 New Zealand High Court, to the south, fronts onto Stout, Whitmore and Ballance Streets. Until 1980 it too was known as the Supreme Court. It was designed by Pierre Finch Martineau Burrows, an English architect, who arrived in 1865 and later became Chief Draughtsman in the Public Works Department. The 1879 tender required the Supreme Court foundations to be sunk down to solid rock. It was Wellington's first public building in masonry. Construction began in 1879 and the foundation stone was laid on 1 December 1879. The Bankruptcy Court used the new building in January 1881 and in March the building was completed. The original plan was to include a Magistrates Court, but the building was shared until a separate structure was completed in 1903 and it was also shared with the Court of Appeal and the Arbitration Court. A 2-storey Arbitration Court building was added in 1927–28, also fronting Stout St and Lambton Quay. The Court of Appeal moved out in the 1950s and the High Court moved to Molesworth Street in 1993, after which the 1881 building fell into decline. It was restored in 2007–2009 as part of the new Supreme Court complex. Isolation bearings with a lead core were added to the foundations of the old Supreme Court during restoration to protect it from earthquakes.

The 2-storey Wellington police station opened in 1880. It was a masonry building in a similar style to the Supreme Court. In 1918 the police moved into a larger building in Waring Taylor Street and the Department of Justice took over.

=== Defence Department ===
Between the courts and the Old Government Buildings was a 2-storey, timber building, started in 1918 and opened in 1919 for the Defence Department. When it was built the north end of Whitmore St was closed and Stout St was extended to meet Featherston St. It had been intended to be temporary, but, after Defence moved out, many other departments used the building, including the Land and Income Tax Department, from 1921 to 1938, the Schools Dentistry Service from 1921, Housing Construction office, the Marine Department's shipping office, the Child Welfare office, the architects' branch of the Public Works Department and part of Lands and Survey Department. A new street design was drawn up in 1963, the building was removed in 1967 and the road reopened in 1969.

=== Mission to Seamen ===
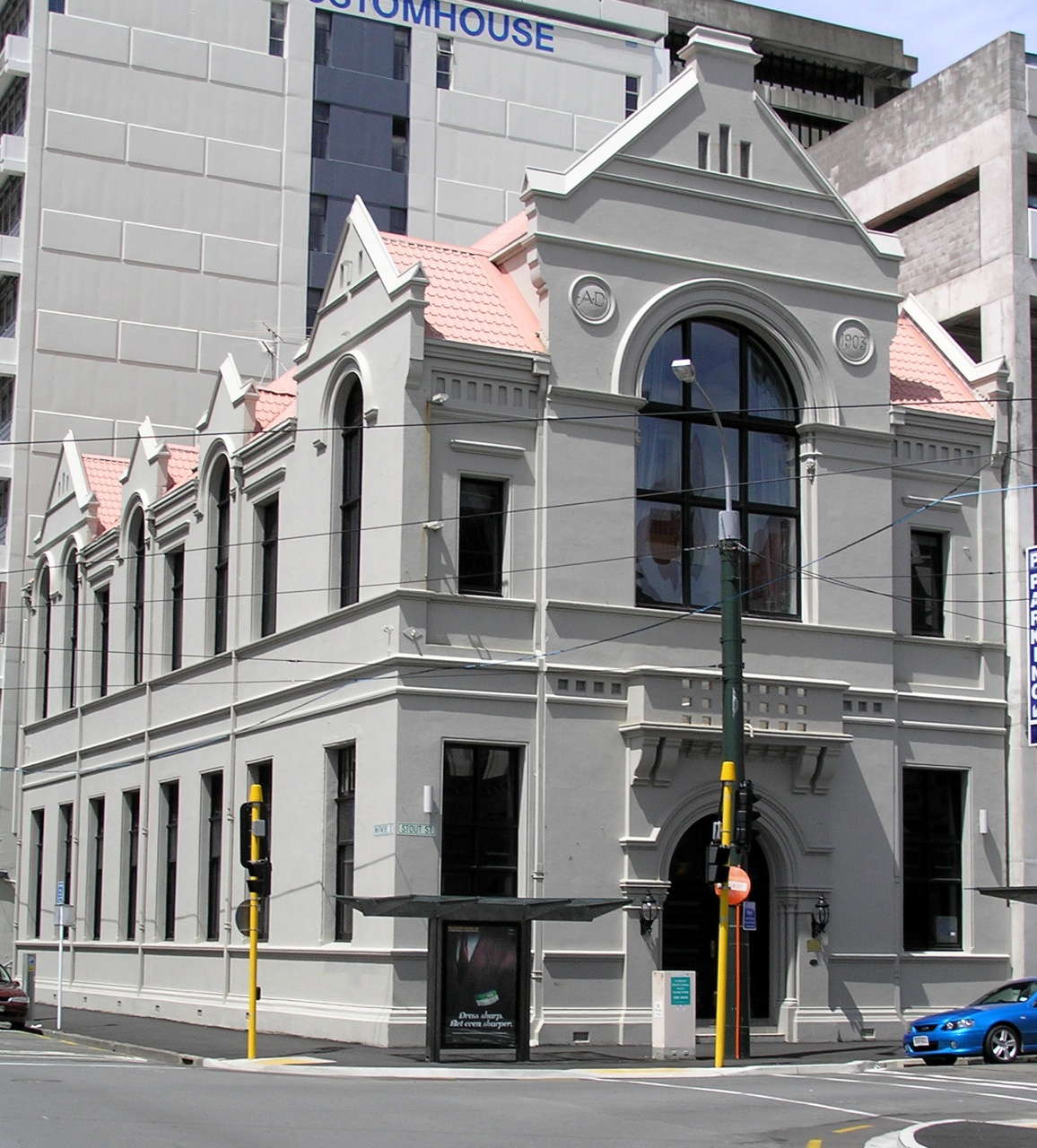
1904 Mission to Seamen

The Mission to Seamen site was bought in 1902 and the Mission was opened by the Governor, Lord Plunket, on 25 August 1904. It closed in 1975. Mary Williams, donated the land as a memorial to her husband, Captain William 'Bully' Williams. The architects, Crichton and McKay, designed the building in an Edwardian style, including two stained glass windows with sea themes. It was claimed to have reduced arrests of drunken sailors in Wellington from 554 in 1902 to 290 in 1909. After a public campaign it was listed as a Grade 1 building by Heritage NZ on 11 July 1986, but much altered internally on conversion to 10 apartments in 1994.

=== Investment House ===
Investment House, opened in 1967, was designed by Gabites and Beard as the 11-storey head office of Public Service Investment Society, now known as the Cooperative Bank. It was on the site of several earlier buildings, including a former Public Trustee office. It has now been renamed Kiwi Wealth House and Customhouse and has many occupants, including the French Embassy, the Law Society, auctioneers, Dunbar Sloane and a 6-floor car park run by Prime Parking.

==== Academy of Fine Arts ====
An exhibition hall was built along Whitmore and Stout Streets in 1885. Across the road, on part of the Investment House site, was the New Zealand Academy of Fine Arts. Its foundation stone was laid by the Governor, the Earl of Glasgow, in 1892 and he opened it on 25 February 1893. There was space for about 400 pictures in its red brick building, which was set back from the street to allow for a decorative entrance. A new front was added in 1916. The gallery was later described as, "a small, modest-looking brick structure, somewhat resembling a spacious bakehouse". It had a corrugated iron roof. From 7 March 1936 its works were moved to the new Dominion Art Gallery on Mount Cook. The 2-storey building was modified in 1939. It was demolished when Investment House was built.

=== Telephone Exchange ===
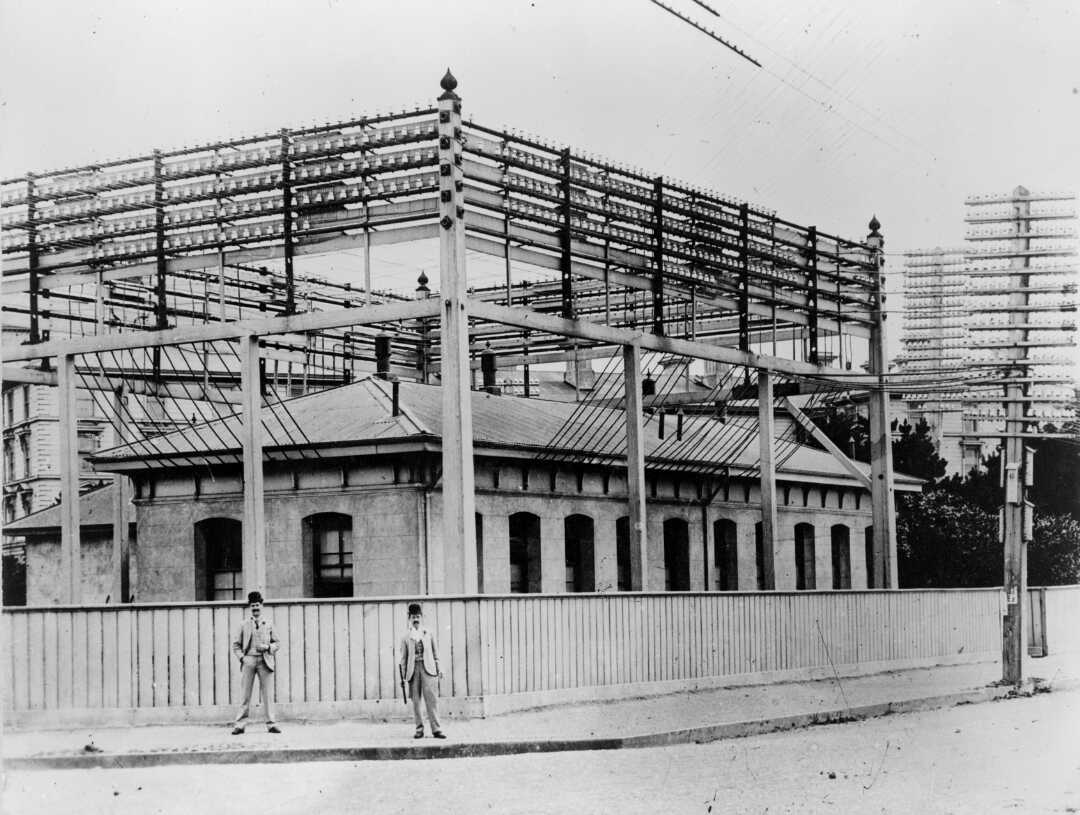
1887–1925 telephone exchange

Spark's 1972 Central Telephone Exchange is on a site bounded by Whitmore, Stout and Featherston St, which was in the grounds of the Parliament Buildings, though cut off from there by the extension of Stout st in 1918, The first exchange on the site opened on 7 July 1887, after being built in 2 months to replace an exchange at the Post Office, which burnt down. It was replaced in 1925. In 1969 work began constructing the current Central Telephone Exchange, which was designed by the Ministry of Works and Development, under John Oien. The building cost $1.4m and its local tandem exchange and toll exchange cost twice as much. The new building was initially beside its 1925 predecessor until it was demolished in the early 1980s to make room for the second stage of the exchange. MOW

=== Rydges Hotel ===
On the corner of Featherston St, the 17-storey, 280 room Rydges Hotel (formerly the Holiday Inn) opened on 25 January 2007. The architects were Studio Pacific and Peddle Thorp. 4 floors cover the whole site, with a tower above that. The development was estimated at $50m, but about $100m had been spent on the hotel, when the developer went into liquidation before the builder, Fletcher Construction, was fully paid. It sold for $100m in 2021, when about $5m was needed for earthquake strengthening.

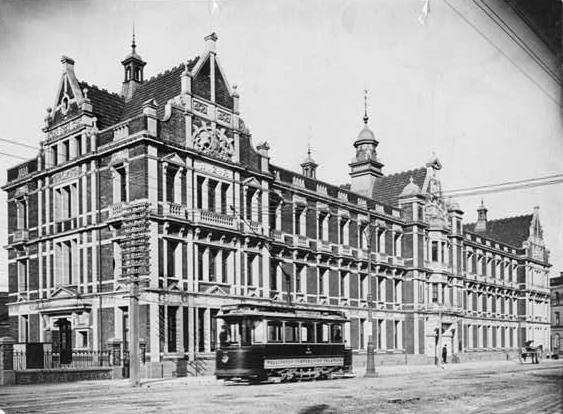
1903–1982 NZR head office

From 1880 to 1885 the hotel site was Wellington's railway station, with a siding running beyond, across the foot of Whitmore St. At that time the street was described as useless and unnecessary, but was said to have been built due to "strong private and personal influence". Te Aro Extension railway crossed Whitmore St to reach Customhouse Quay between 25 March 1893 and 6 May 1917. Despite having a crossing keeper, there were several collisions at the level crossing, including a death in 1906. The rails south of Whitmore St were removed in 1923, but those to the north remained until 1933.

New Zealand Railways head office opened beside the line in 1903. It was in Renaissance style, built of red, pressed, facing bricks, Oamaru stone, Port Chalmers blue stone and red Marseilles roofing tiles. It was 236 ft (72 m) long, 48 ft (15 m) wide and had a 90 ft (27 m) high central tower. The Marine Department's shipping branch moved to the corner of Whitmore Street and Waterloo Quay, in the old railway publicity sheds, in 1933. In 1938 the Defence Department took over the building. By 1940 it had lost its turrets and other decoration, as an earthquake precaution. It was demolished in 1982.

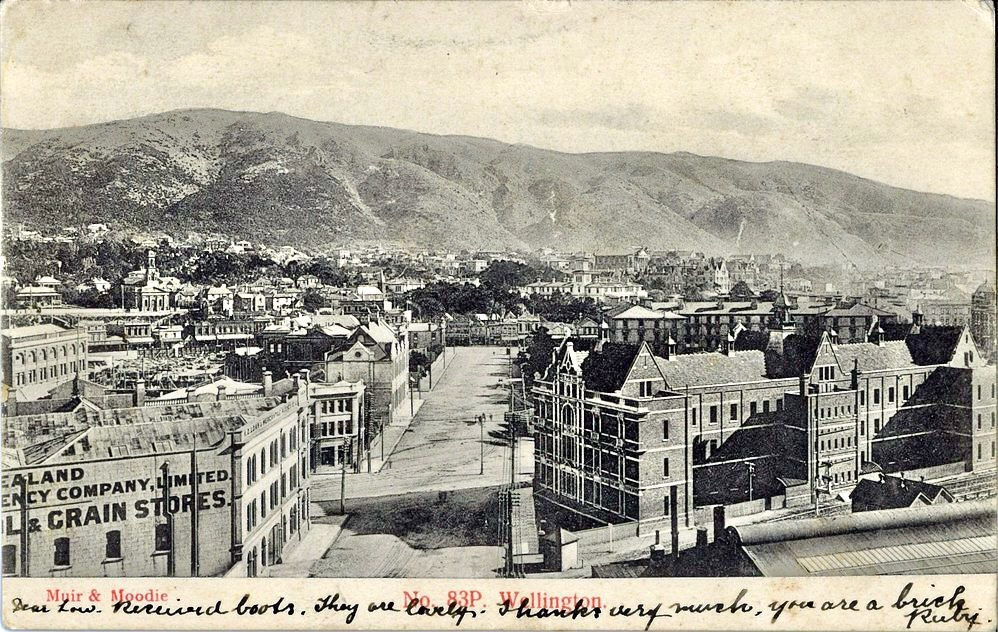
Whitmore Street 1906 showing the Te Aro branch railway, NZR HQ, NZ Loan & Mercantile Agency warehouse and Seamen's Mission

=== Bank of New Zealand ===
A new BNZ headquarters on the Customhouse Quay corner is due to open in 2023. Geological cores taken during its construction included up to 20 cm (7.9 in) of ash from Taupō's Oruanui eruption. It had previously been part of the railway and was then sold for a petrol station in 1926, which the British International Oil Company opened in 1932. It was an expanding, price cutting company, owned by sons of BNZ's general manager, but was sold to Gilmore Oil in 1932.

In 1888 NZ Loan & Mercantile Agency started a 21 year lease of the northern part of the site, where their 3-storey grain and wool warehouse was built in 1889. A 3-storey brick building for plumbers, Jenkins & Mack, was built alongside it in 1904.

=== NZ Post ===
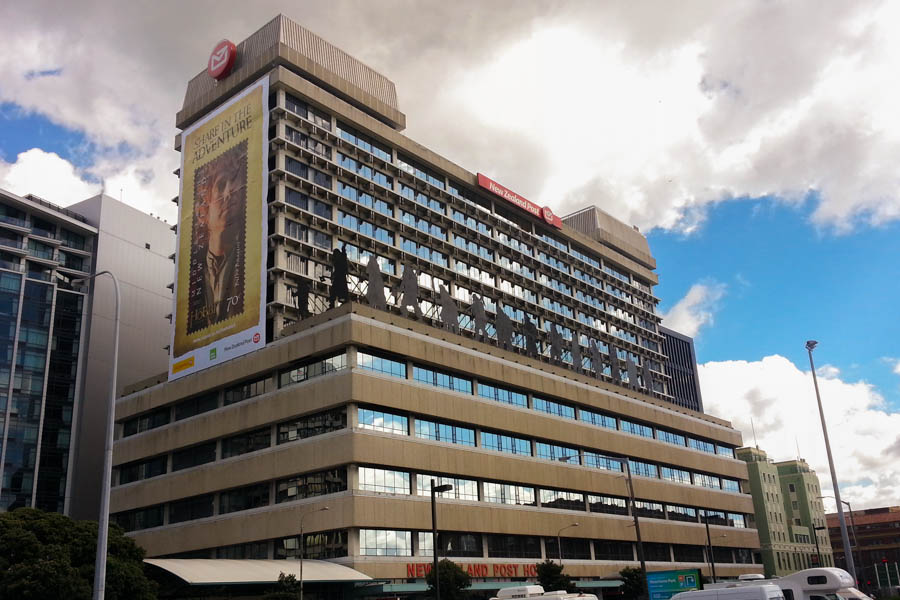
1971 NZ Post building in 2013

On the opposite side of Whitmore St, the 13-storey Post Office building extends along Waterloo Quay. It was opened by Sir Keith Holyoake on 6 July 1971. In 1938 it had been planned to put an 8, or 9-storey building on the site for the Government Printer and work continued in 1940, but stopped in 1941, due to the war, and never resumed. It wasn't until 1966 that a new print building opened in Thorndon, which has been used by Archives New Zealand since 1990. In 1892 part of the site fronting Waterloo Quay was occupied by Lion Foundry.

== Gallery ==
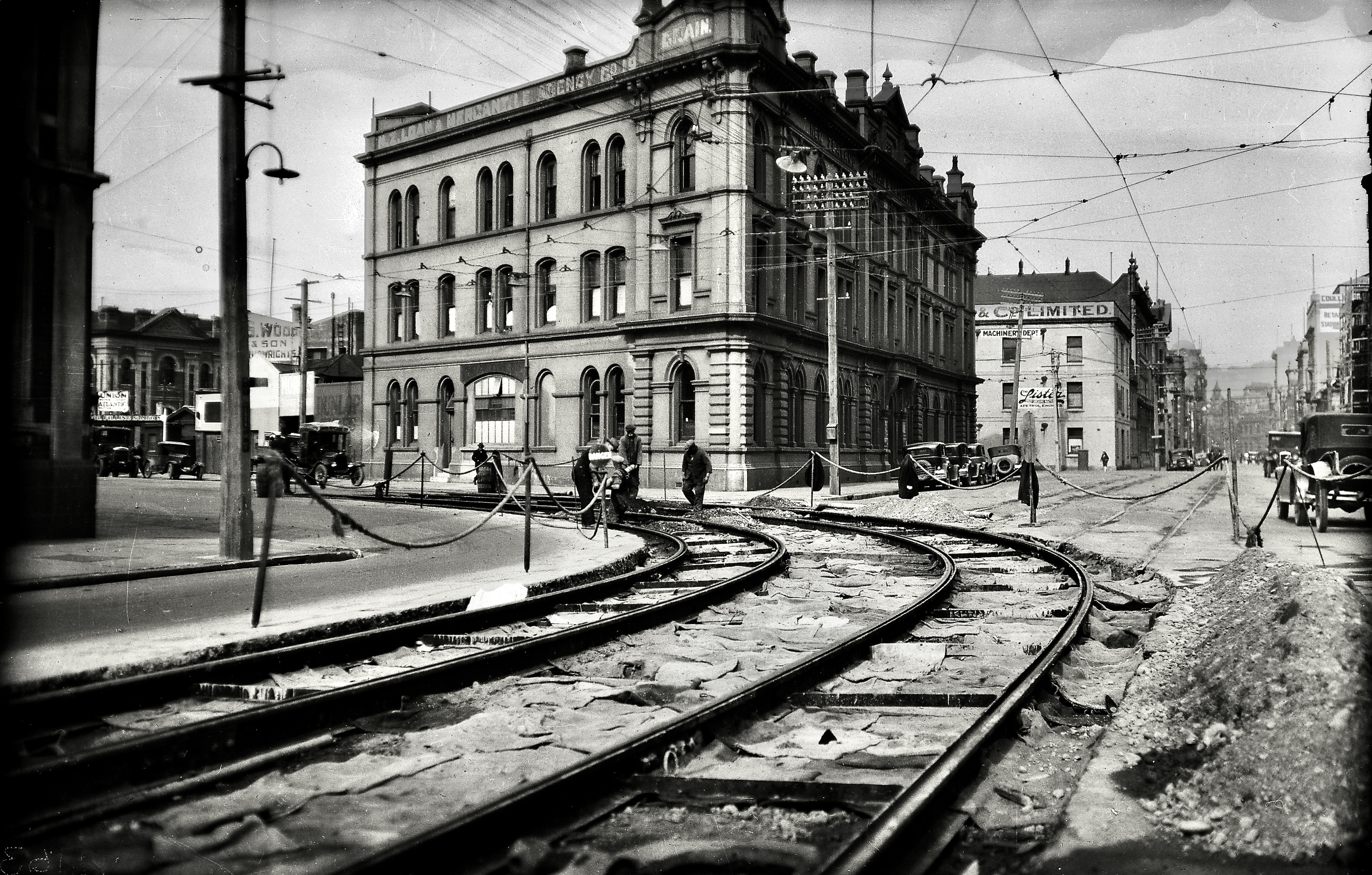
1932 diversion of tram tracks in front of Loan and Mercantile building, Featherston St

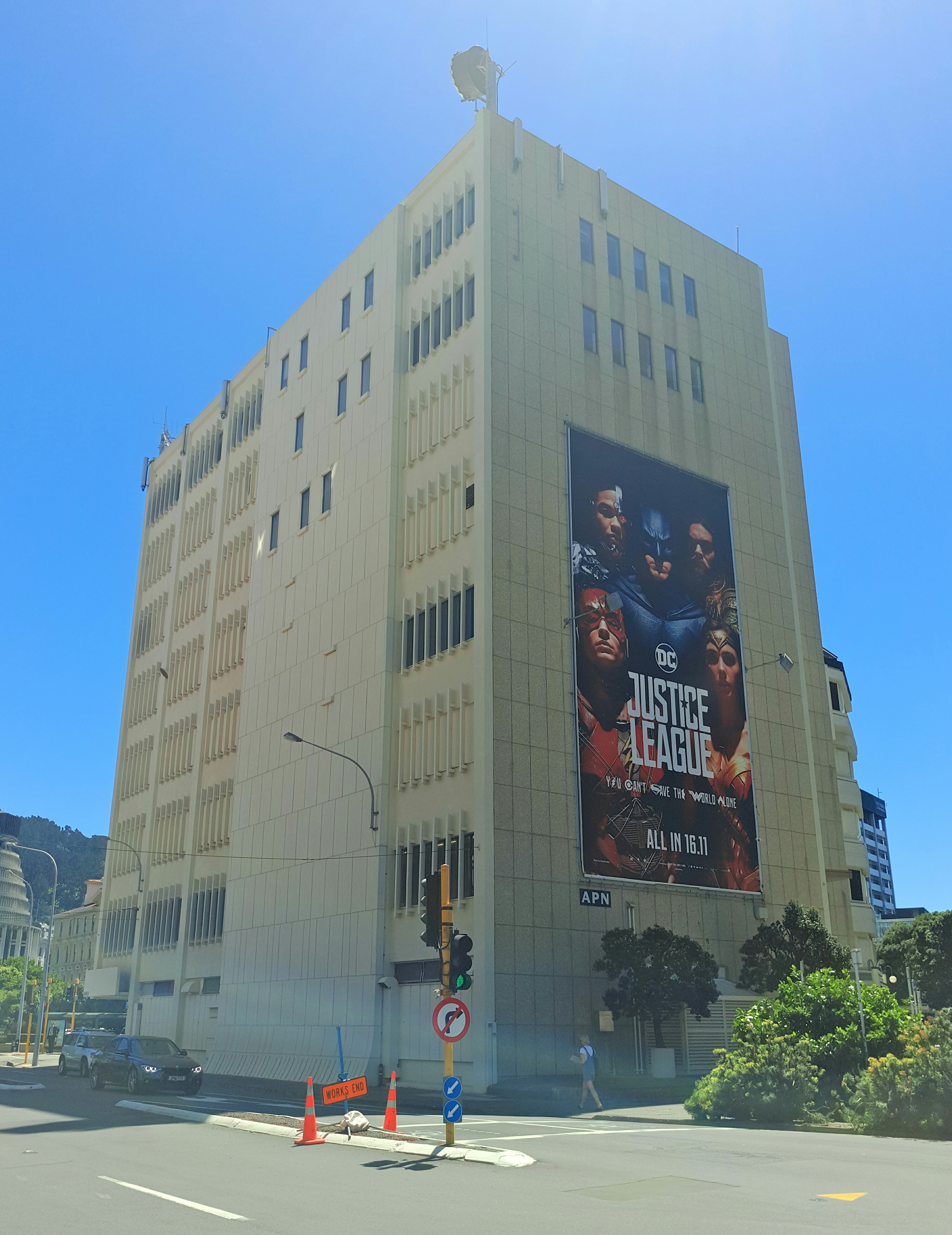
1972 Spark exchange
