= Old Government Buildings, Wellington =

Heritage building in New Zealand

Old Government Buildings
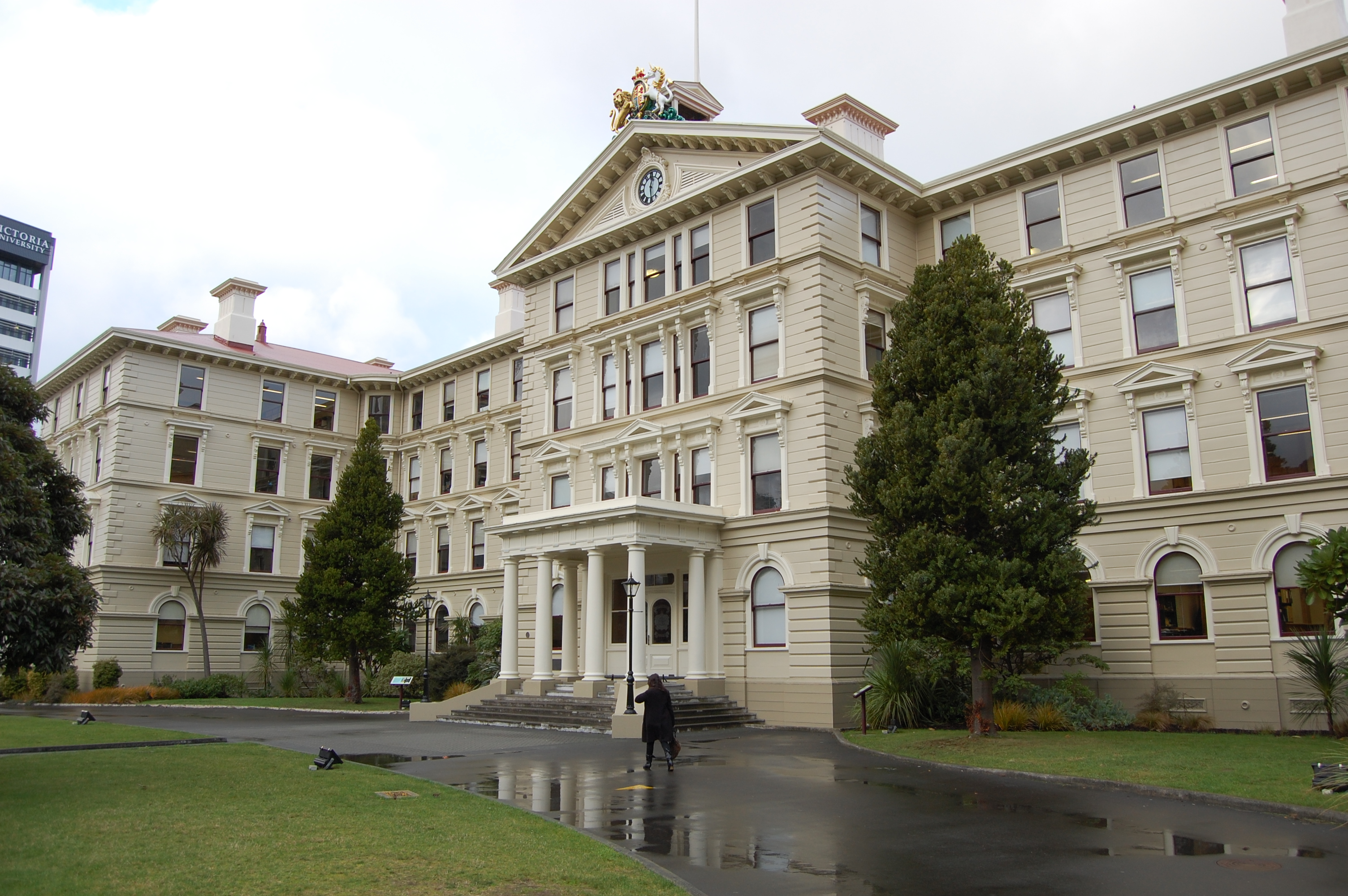
- The Old Government Buildings seen from the front right

General information
- Architectural style: Neo-Renaissance
- Location: 55 Lambton Quay, Wellington, New Zealand
- Coordinates: 41°16′46″S 174°46′41″E
- Current tenants: Victoria University of Wellington Faculty of Law
- Construction started: 1875
- Completed: 1876
- Landlord: Heritage New Zealand

Technical details
- Floor count: 4

Design and construction
- Architect: William Clayton

Heritage New Zealand – Category 1
- Designated: 2 July 1982
- Reference no.: 37

The Old Government Buildings are a 4-storey, 143-room wooden heritage building complex located on the Government Buildings Historic Reserve, on Lambton Quay in central Pipitea, Wellington. It is the largest timber-framed building in the Southern Hemisphere.

The buildings were completed in 1876 on land reclaimed from Wellington Harbour to house the young New Zealand Government and its public service. The building now houses the Law school of Victoria University of Wellington.

Registered as a Category 1 historic building by Heritage New Zealand, the Old Government Buildings are also a popular tourist destination.

== Description ==
The Old Government Buildings is a grand Italianate palazzo-style wooden building located on Lambton Quay in Wellington, New Zealand.

== History ==
=== Construction and style ===
The building was commissioned in the early 1870s by the Fox Ministry, partially in anticipation of the abolition of the provincial governments. It was originally planned to have the building constructed in concrete and timber, but the cost of concrete at the time led to a decision to build in timber alone. The Italianate, Neo-Renaissance style was usually the domain of stone buildings, thus the building is designed to mimic stone. As an important symbol of nationhood, the building was constructed to resemble an Italian stone palace to help convey its strength and stability in the expanding empire. The timber is native kauri, which could not be replicated because New Zealand's remaining public kauri forests are permanently protected. If the building had been constructed out of stone as planned, it may not have survived subsequent earthquakes, as it is situated near a major fault line. The architect was William Clayton and the contractors were Scoular and Archibald.

The building has 143 rooms, 64 toilets, 126 fireplaces and 22 chimneys. When it opened in 1876, after 22 months of construction, and at a cost of £39 000, it was easily the largest building in the country and is now considered to be one of New Zealand's most important historic buildings. The building was built on reclaimed land.

=== Expansion and restoration ===
The building was extended in 1897 and again in 1907, with additions to the wings. It was also surrounded by outbuildings, and the original interior obscured by partitions, linings and paint. Following the departure of the Education Department, the building underwent thorough restoration under the management of the Department of Conservation, which at the time included the Historic Places Trust. Although some early work was done in the 1980s, the bulk of the restoration took place from 1994 to 1996. Many original features were replicated, including fireplaces although these are now purely decorative. The original tōtara piles were replaced with concrete. Over 500 cubic metres of recycled kauri was used during the restoration project, to supplement the original timber. Verandahs, late Victorian and Edwardian water radiators, the original clock and coat of arms, a water-powered hydraulic lift, and the impressive staircases were all restored or preserved.

The piles, originally tōtara, are now concrete. All structural framing is Tasmanian hardwood (now augmented with pinus radiata), while weatherboards, flooring and finishing timbers are kauri. A two-year programme of restoration of the 804 sash windows in the building was completed in 2021.

=== Smokefree policy ===
Over concerns about the threat of fire, smoking was banned within the building from its opening, making it the first building in the world to have a smoke-free policy.

=== Changing uses ===
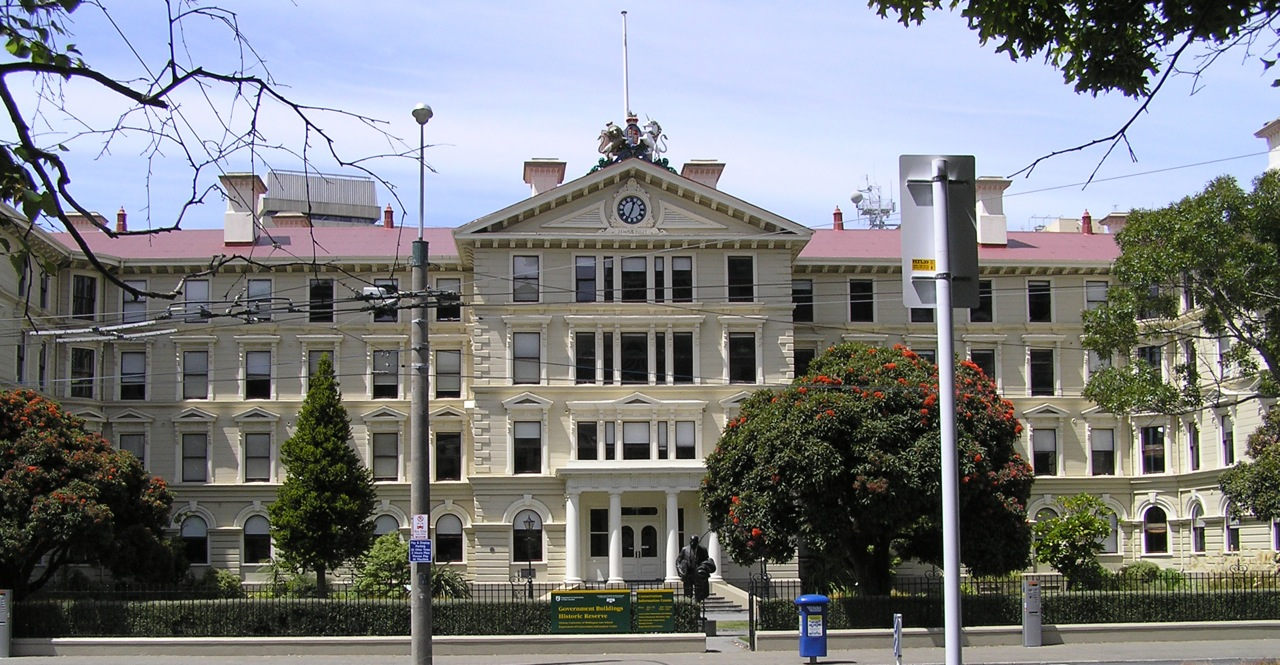
The building is now home to the Victoria University of Wellington Faculty of Law. Pictured in 2005.

The former Government Buildings was an important symbol of nationhood, as it was completed in the same month that provincial government in New Zealand ended and central government 'finally asserted its authority'. The building initially housed the entire Wellington-based civil service as well as the entire New Zealand Cabinet. In addition, the Executive Council met there until 1948. The civil service rapidly expanded beyond the capacity of the building, with the first department leaving shortly after it was opened. By 1975 only the Education Department remained, and by 1990 the building was empty.

After housing government departments for 114 years, Government funding was made available and restoration began in 1994 under the management of the Department of Conservation, which became the building's owners. Wherever possible the building was to be restored to its 1907 appearance, when the north and south wing extensions were completed. The project spanned two years and cost $25 million. The government buildings were formally reopened in January 1996 after the Law Faculty of Victoria University signed a 50-year tenancy that year and became its new occupants. Its restoration is considered a landmark government-initiated heritage conservation project.

In June 2017, the care of the building was transferred from the Department of Conservation to Heritage New Zealand.

== Public admission ==
The building was reopened in January 1996. The grounds are open to the public, and contain examples of rare native New Zealand flora. The public may view the displays on the ground floor and the Cabinet room on the first floor, but the rest of the building is leased to the Victoria University School of Law. Heritage New Zealand operates tourism visits to the site.

== Suspected arson attack ==
In March 2015, the buildings suffered minimal damage in a suspected arson attack.

== See also ==
- Ostankino Palace, third-largest wooden building in the world
