= St Andrew's Kirk, Launceston =

St Andrew's Kirk
- St Andrew's Presbyterian Church
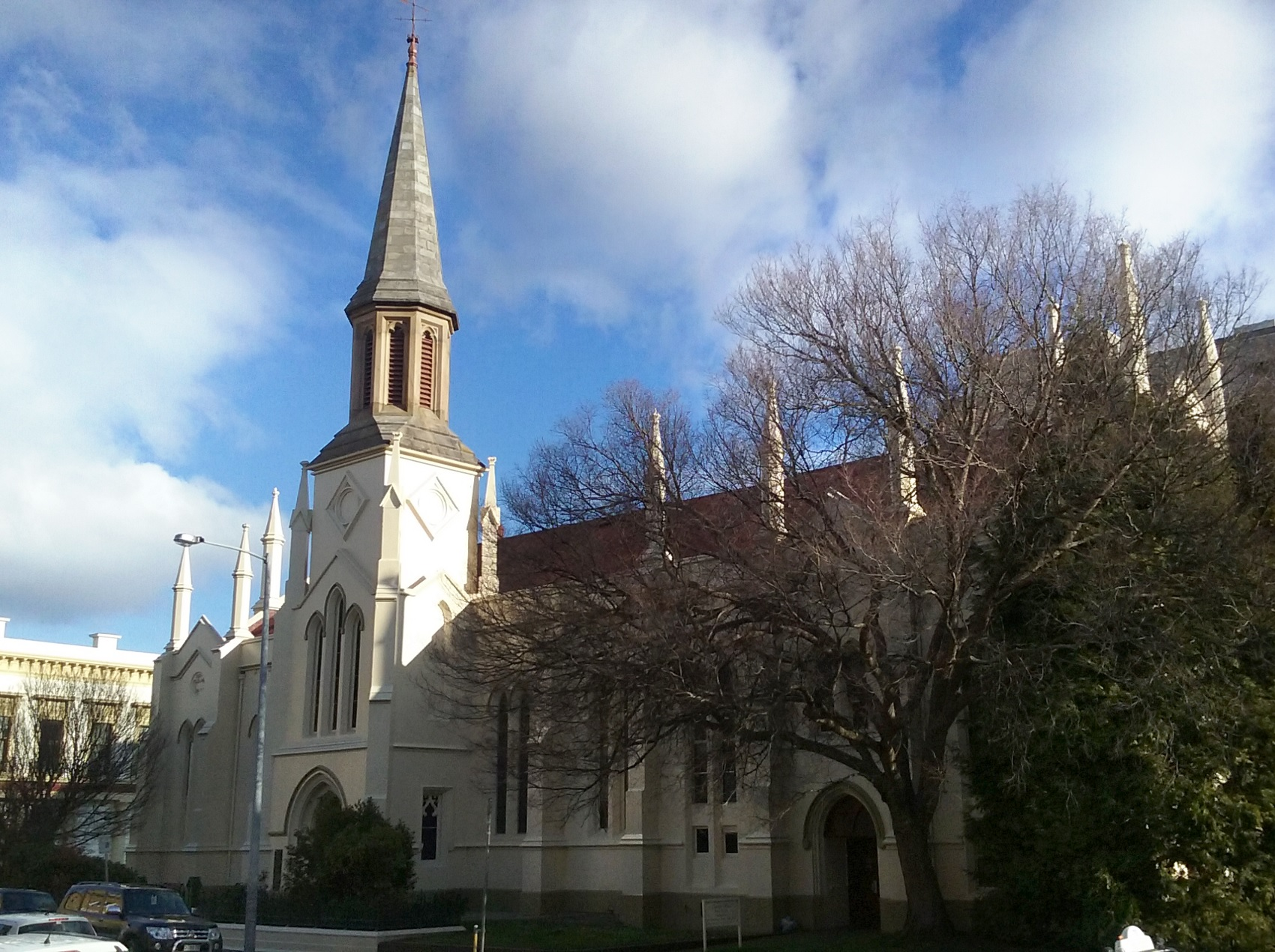
- St Andrew's Kirk from St John Street
- St Andrew's Kirk
- 41°26′10″S 147°08′15″E
- Location: St John Street, Launceston, Tasmania
- Country: Australia
- Denomination: Presbyterian
- Website: launceston.pctas.org.au

History
- Status: Church
- Founded: 16 October 1849
- Founder: Sir William Thomas Denison
- Dedication: Saint Andrew
- Dedicated: 5 December 1850

Architecture
- Functional status: Active
- Architects: William Henry Clayton (1850); William Clennett (1974)
- Architectural type: Church
- Style: Gothic Revival
- Years built: 1850 (main church); 1974 (commercial chambers); 1986 (vestibule)
- Groundbreaking: 1849
- Construction cost: A£3,956

Specifications
- Capacity: 320 people
- Length: 38.4 metres (126 ft)
- Materials: Sandstone, brick, stucco

Administration
- Division: Tasmania
- Parish: Launceston

St Andrew's Kirk, Launceston, is a Presbyterian church located on St John Street in Launceston, Tasmania, Australia, serving the Presbytery of Bass. It was the second Presbyterian church to be built in the city of Launceston following the Scotch National Church on Charles Street (built 1831).

== History ==
=== Background ===
On the 9 April 1831, a meeting of the Scottish community of Launceston met to discuss the idea of erecting a place of worship for the Presbyterian community which resulted in the construction of a chapel, the Scottish National Church, on Charles Street near the port for the cost of £400. The first minister appointed to the church was a former Church of Scotland minister, Reverend John Anderson MA, who arrived in the city earlier the same year. On the 6 November 1835, the Presbytery of Presbytery of Van Diemen's land, the second oldest presbytery in Australia, met for the first time in the chapel. On 6 July 1848, Reverend R. K. Ewing joined Mr Anderson in charge of the church and shortly thereafter it became apparent that a larger church was needed to accommodate the growing congregation.

=== Construction ===
Following calls for a new, larger church, a suitable site was secured closer to the growing business district of Launceston. The land was secured with a petition to Lieutenant-Governor, Sir William Thomas Denison for a lot of land occupied by one of the colony's original watch houses. The Building Committee advertised for plans of a church capable of seating 700 people.

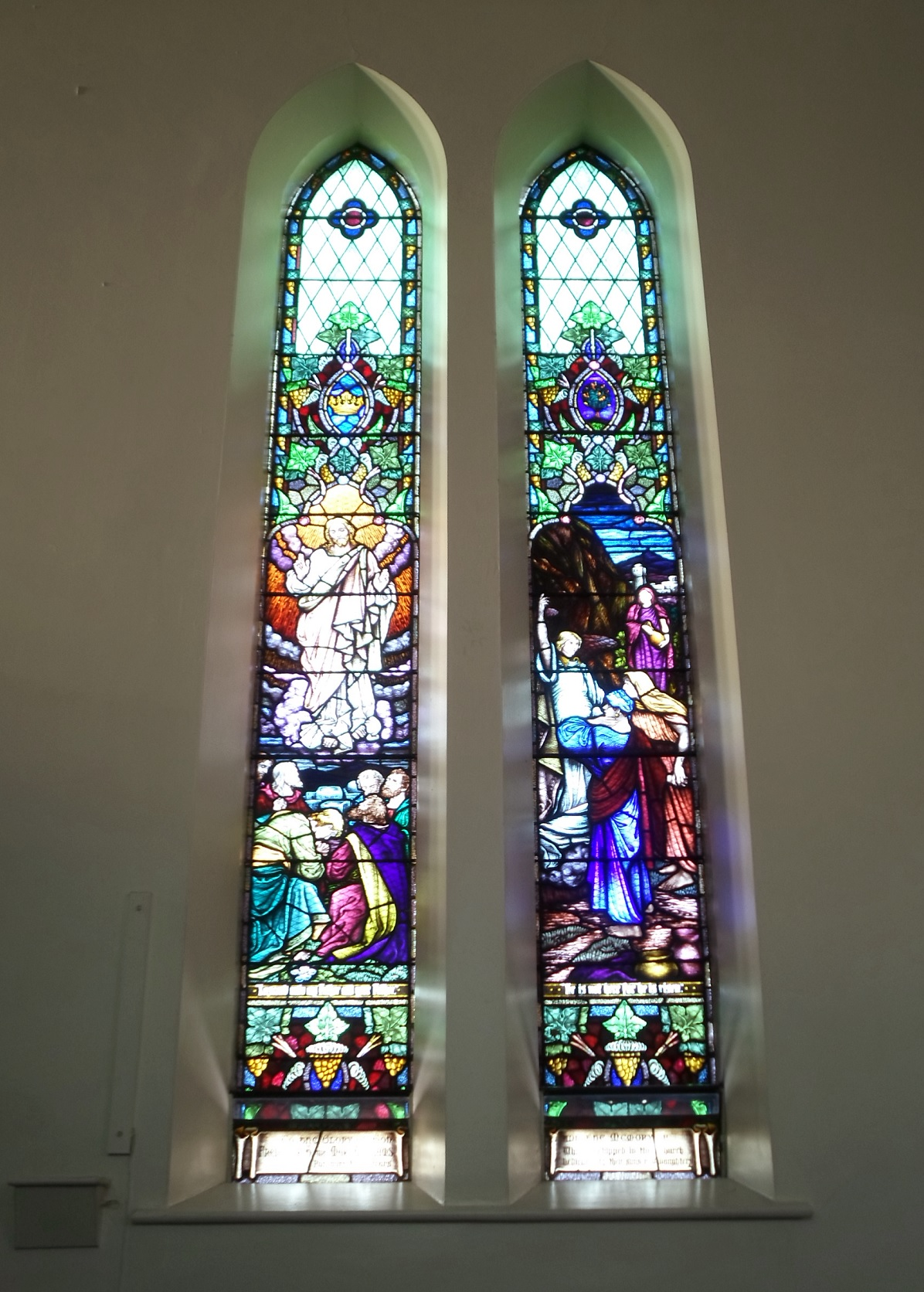
One of the window pairs depicting the story of Christ

A total of 14 designs were submitted by eight competitors with the winning design, though significantly smaller than advertised with a capacity of only 320, was won by William Henry Clayton of Norfolk Plains who later went on to become the Colonial Architect for the New Zealand Government. Clayton's plans called for a simple Gothic-inspired church built from local bricks rendered over in stucco with sandstone decorations and spire with entrances off both Patterson and St John Streets.

On 16 October 1849, the foundation stone for the new church was laid by Lieutenant-Governor Denison. Alongside the foundation stone, a time capsule containing newspapers of the time and various coins including a gold sovereign and a half sovereign was placed. Construction of the church was undertaken by builder William Tyson, himself a member of the congregation, for a cost of A£3,956 which was paid in six instalments coinciding with milestones of completion with a timespan of 15 months for works to be done. The church was officially named and opened to service on 5 December 1850 and within four years was debt free.

=== Extensions ===
As the church continued to grow in use, a series of extensions and alterations were added to the original building. The most significant extension was that of St Andrew's Chambers, a two-story, Gothic Revival building built in a roughly 8.5 meter gap between the original church and the Launceston Mechanics Institute fronting onto St John Street. St Andrew's Chambers housed a number of church utilities including a kitchen, care-takers flat, a Sunday School Hall and commercial chambers. During the construction of Civic Square and subsequent demolition of the mechanics institute building (at the time serving as the Launceston Library) in 1973, the Launceston City Council decided that the then-exposed side walls of St Andrew's Chambers were unsightly and the decision was made to remove the chambers. City Architect William Clennett was appointed by the council to redesign a new, more 'sympathetic' extension to replace the old chambers. The new chambers, continuing but dividing the original profile of the church into 3 levels contained office space, a kindergarten, choir room, church lounge and a Sunday School Hall on the uppermost level. Construction costs escalated to $111,138 but the new chambers were debt free upon opening in October 1974. Later alterations in 1986 included the addition of a new vestibule, additional seating on the internal balcony and glass screens in the foyer. Addition of sound and lighting equipment was installed in 1996.

== Damage ==
Between 1883 and 1885, a series of earth tremors were felt across Tasmania and Victoria which were attributed to the eruption of Krakatoa. One such tremor recorded on 14 July 1884 caused extensive damage in Launceston affecting mostly chimneys and plasterwork of various buildings around the city. This tremor skewed and shifted a number of the masonry pinnacles surrounding the roof of the church, one so much so that it was cast to the ground with considerable force as to indent 6 inches into the dirt, missing a group of children waiting to go into the Sunday School. A few decades later a similar event occurred on 30 December 1929 with another tremor toppling one of the spires from the church.

== Organ ==
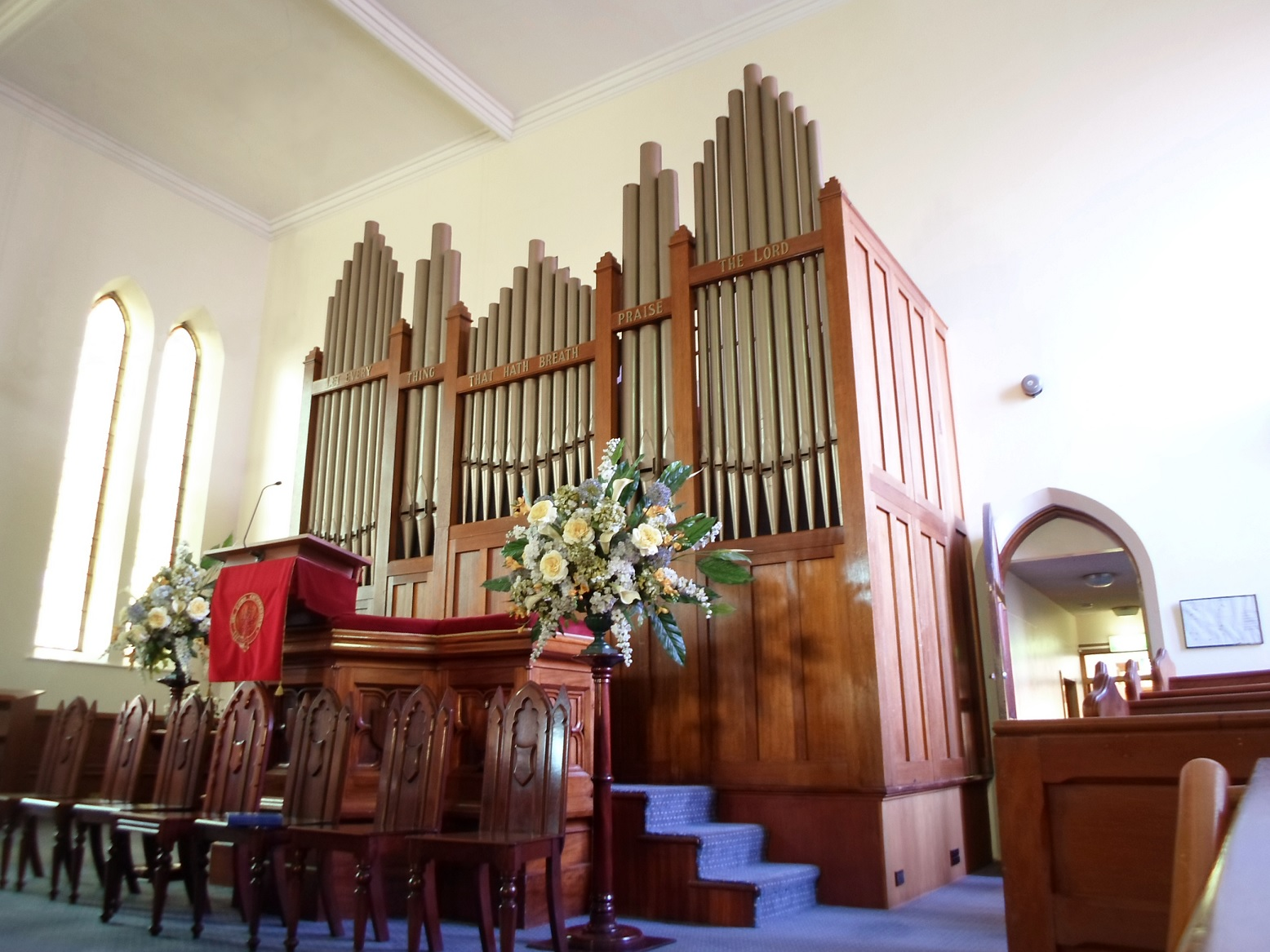
Current organ installed in 1933

In 1933, the original organ was replaced with the present-day organ, originally built in 1860 for Dr. Valentine of Campbell Town. Before being installed in St Andrew's Kirk, the organ was used in the Seaman's Mission in Hobart and St Luke's Church of England in Latrobe. In 1961, the organ was rebuilt and enlarged to its current size by Davis and Laurie followed by a 2005 rebuild of its electro-pneumatic action which was installed in the earlier 1961 rebuild.

== See also ==
- Presbyterian Church of Australia
