= William Clayton (architect) =

Tasmanian-born colonial architect

William Henry Clayton
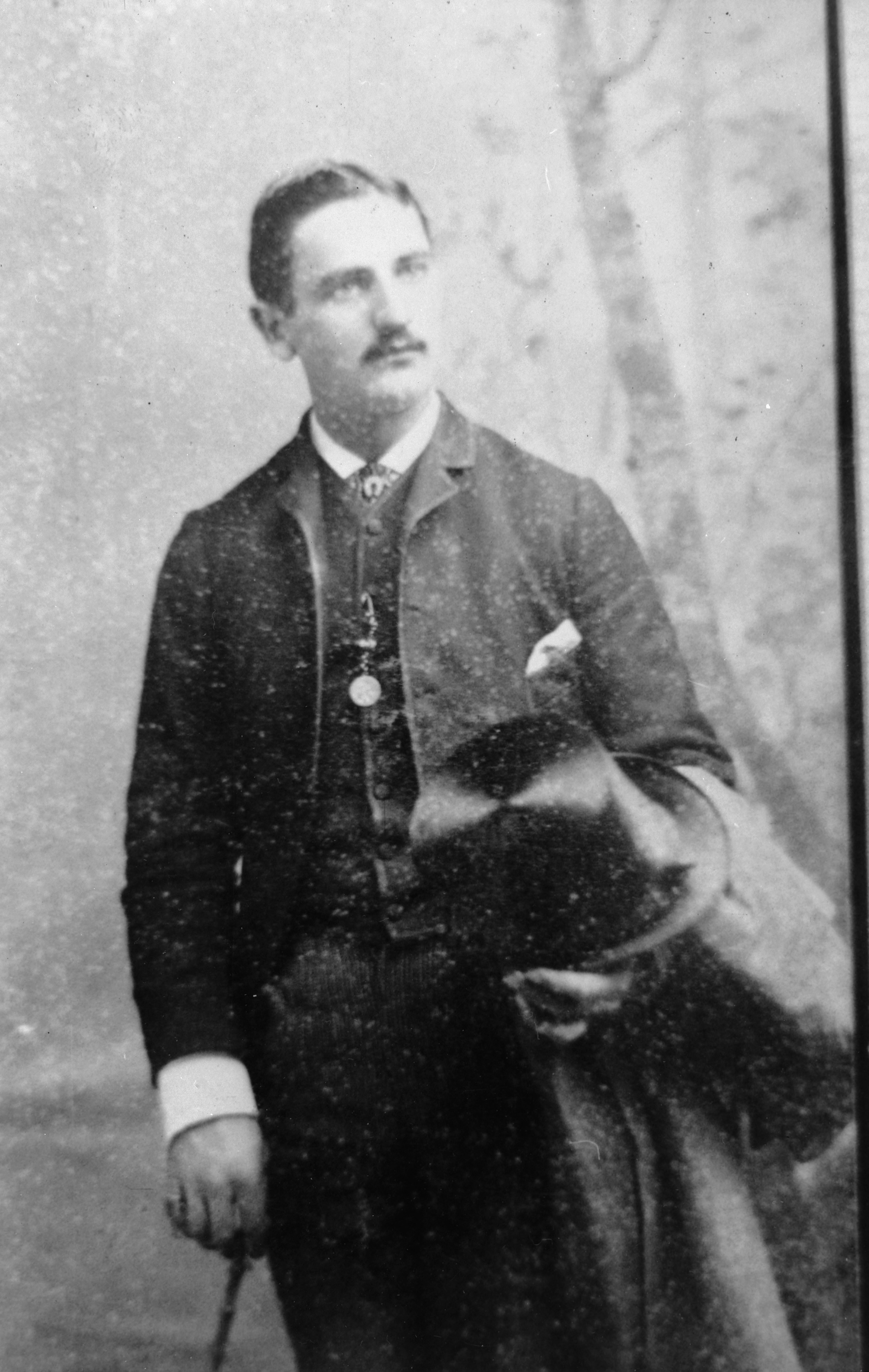
- Born: 17 November 1823; Norfolk Plains, Van Diemen's Land, Colony of New South Wales
- Died: 23 August 1877 (aged 53); Dunedin, New Zealand
- Occupation: Architect
- Spouse: Emily Samson (m. 1847)
- Parent(s): Mary McLaughlan and Henry Clayton
- Buildings: St Andrew's Kirk, Launceston; All Saints' Church, Dunedin; Old Government Buildings, Wellington; Chief Post Office, Christchurch

William Henry Clayton (17 November 1823 – 23 August 1877) was a Tasmanian-born colonial architect who practised initially in Van Diemen's Land (Tasmania) and then in New Zealand. He was New Zealand's first (and only) Colonial Architect (Note: Although other architects served in the office and titled themselves as 'Colonial Architect' Clayton was the only person to officially hold the title), serving in the position from 1869 up until his death. In this role, he and his office were responsible for the design of numerous government buildings.

== Early life and education ==
William was born on 17 November 1823, in a house called Wickford at Norfolk Plains, Van Diemen's Land, Colony of New South Wales, one of the 13 children of Mary (nee McLaughlan) and Henry Clayton. William's grandfather (who bore the same name) had been sentenced in 1802 to transportation for seven years to Australia for the possession of a purportedly stolen sheepskin. His wife Sarah and three-year-old Henry accompanied him on the convict ship Glatton which reached New South Wales in 1803.

At the age of 16 Henry received a land grant Van Diemen's Land, which enabled him to become a prosperous businessman by the time his son William was born. As well as land holdings, by the 1840s Henry also owned several flour mills and owned or chartered ships which he used to export flour from his mills to New Zealand and bring back cargo.

William was educated at the local exclusive Longford Hall Academy, where he won prizes in geography, French, Latin and mathematics. As Henry Clayton wanted his son to have the benefits of higher education, the family moved to England, departing on 28 March 1840 on the Adelaide. William furthered his education by being articled to a prominent architect, and received training in architecture, civil engineering and surveying.

Following his marriage in 1847 in England, Clayton and his wife Emily departed for Van Diemen's Land, arriving on 7 March 1848.

== Van Diemen's Land/Tasmania ==
Upon his return to Van Diemen's Land (Tasmania) Clayton worked in the Government Survey Office from 1851 to 1855 before setting up in private practice in Launceston. Clayton is credited with the design of some 300 structures in Tasmania, including five churches (among them Launceston's St Andrew's Kirk 1850, St Mark's, Deloraine 1860, and Chalmers Church, Launceston 1860), three banks, a theatre, three mills, breweries, mansions, villas, five bridges, and the Launceston Mechanics' Institute (1842).

The Public Building in Launceston (1860), which was constructed of brick with richly-modelled freestone dressings and Italianate classical in style, was the most ambitious and lavish of his secular works.

Clayton was a member of the Royal Victorian Institute of Architects, Melbourne, served as a Launceston Alderman from 1857 to 1863, and was appointed a justice of the peace in 1858.

== New Zealand career ==
With a depression effecting Australia and attracted by the gold rush which had brought new prosperity to Dunedin, Clayton emigrated to New Zealand on the Omeo arriving in Dunedin on 29 April 1863. His wife and six children followed soon after. Initially he practiced on his own account before entering into a partnership in 1864 with existing well-established architect William Mason, practicing under the name of Mason and Clayton. Over the next six years Clayton designed 84 buildings. Among the most prominent buildings were the Oamaru Post Office (1864), the Colonial Museum (1864) in Wellington, All Saints' Church, Dunedin (1865) and Edinburgh House (1865) in Dunedin. Following his election as the first mayor of Dunedin in 1865 Mason reduced his involvement in the practice.

Clayton's first involvement with Wellington was when Mason & Clayton received the commission to design the Colonial Museum. Subsequently, the partnership received the commission in 1865 to design Government House in Wellington. While Mason was involved in the selection of the site it was Clayton who eventually took the lead role with his design being preferred by the Premier, Frederick Weld. However, its construction was postponed when the government was unable to obtain the site that had been chosen for the building. By the late 1860s the gold boom was over in Otago and with work in Dunedin declining Mason and Clayton dissolved their partnership in 1868. While the economy was stagnant there was a large unfulfilled requirement throughout the country for public buildings. Looking around for work, Clayton proposed to the Colonial Secretary in October 1868 that he complete the design and call tenderers for Government House. His offer was accepted. Following delivery of his plans in January 1969 he was hired on 16 February of that same year to supervise construction of the building.

=== Colonial architect ===
In April 1869 agreement was reached for Clayton to take up the post of Colonial Architect and Superintendent of Public Works, reporting to the Colonial Secretary, E. W. Stafford. Based in Wellington, his office was to be called the Colonial Architect's Department. He was to be paid £200 a year to cover all works or contracts up to £200 and a commission of 2.5% on contracts exceeding that amount. Despite the poor compensation for someone of his skills Clayton identified it as an opportunity for him to design a wide range of buildings throughout the country. To both supplement his income and because of his concerns about the insecurity of his position he negotiated the right to maintain a private practice. Following his appointment, Clayton wound up his affairs in Dunedin and together with his family departed from Dunedin for Wellington on 12 May 1869 on board the Airedale.

It was initially envisaged that Clayton's office would be responsible for the design of all new government buildings and overseeing their construction as well as making additions and repairs to existing buildings but later some building-types were later excluded, such as lighthouses, defence structures and railway stations. Generally, he was responsible for Auckland and Wellington government houses, parliament buildings, court houses, customs houses, departmental offices, prisons, police stations, post offices, as well as maintenance of public domains. Clayton's appointment coincided with the start of the extensive public work schemes of his son-in-law Julius Vogel who became colonial treasurer in June 1969 and was Premier from 1873 to 1875. These projects, on top of the existing backlog, created a large workload for Clayton who began working with people only appointed for only short periods to support him in line with fluctuating work demands. To assist in the quick design and construction of smaller public buildings Clayton developed standard designs featuring timber construction, steep roofs with deeply overhanging gables and standard windows.

In his first financial year (1869–70) in the role Clayton reported he earned £1,161.11.0. In 1871 the government forced him to agree to a salary of £700 though Clayton insisted on retaining the right to maintain a private practice. On one occasion he threatened to resign when he received criticism over it. It wasn't until 1876 that he finally relinquished the right to engage in private practice.

In October 1873 Clayton's office was transferred at his urging to the newly established Public Works Department as its Colonial Architect's Branch, with Clayton reporting to the Engineer-in-Chief of the department. The transfer of his office allowed Clayton to appoint his first permanent 'core' staff. Among the appointments were William Beatson (1807–70) and Pierre Finch Martineau Burrows (1842–1920). Following his move to Wellington Clayton designed his own private residence at 53 Hobson Street which, when it was finished in 1874, was the first concrete house in New Zealand and the first house to have hot and cold running water. In carrying out his duties Clayton travelled widely, visiting Auckland, Tauranga, Gisborne, Napier and Nelson in 1875, and undertaking a major tour of the South Island in 1876.

During Clayton's period as Colonial Architect he designed and saw to completion 180 buildings, with 80 of them being post and telegraph offices. He also privately designed 18 buildings, including private residences, butcher shops, a Catholic church and bank branches. He designed many public buildings in Wellington, including the old Government House and Parliament buildings, but he is best known for designing the Old Government Buildings in Wellington, then part of the New Zealand Parliament Buildings and the second-largest wooden building in the world (behind Tōdai-ji in Nara, Japan). An important design in Christchurch is the Chief Post Office in Cathedral Square, a Category I heritage building.

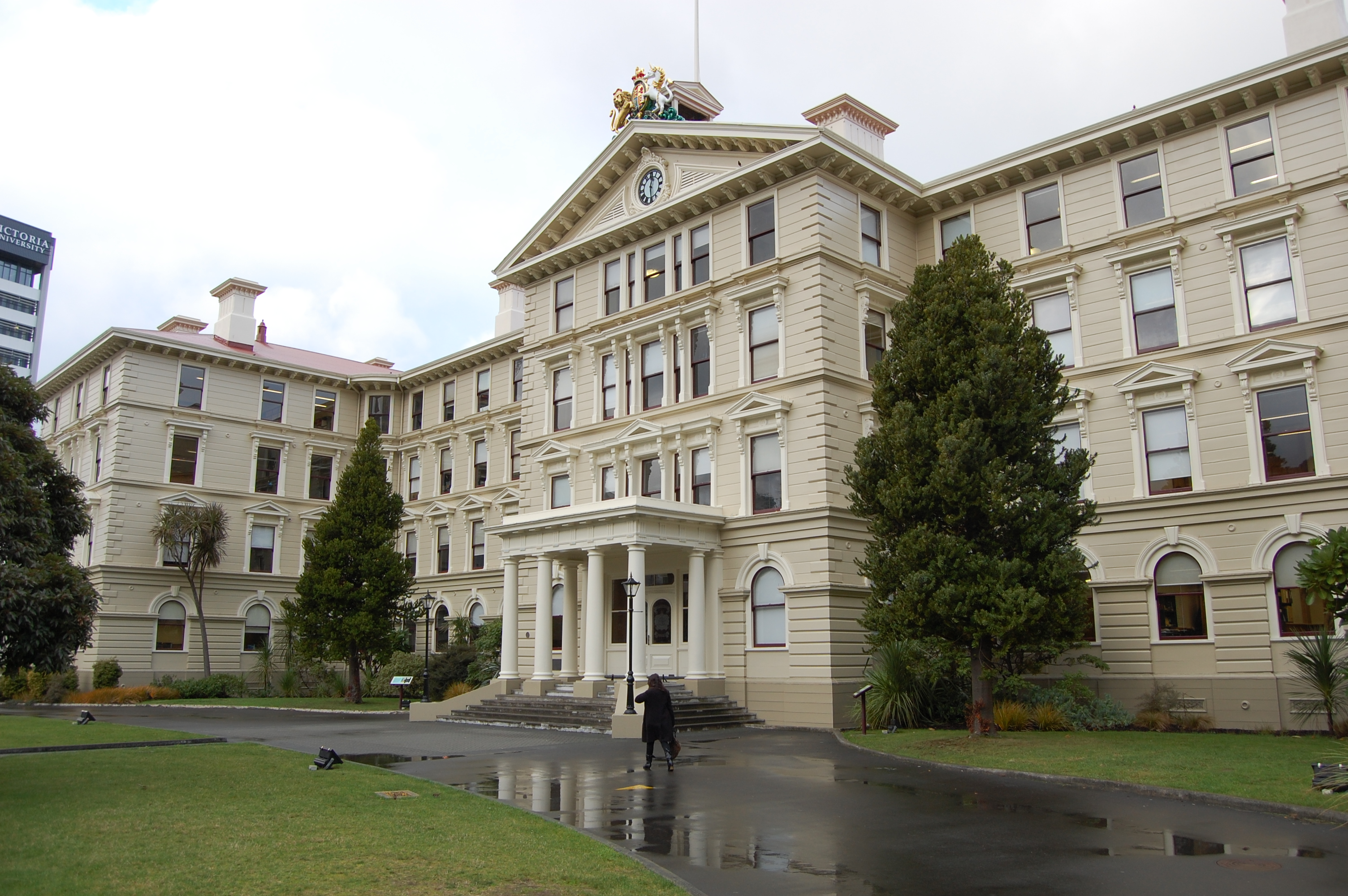
Old Government Buildings, Wellington

== Death ==
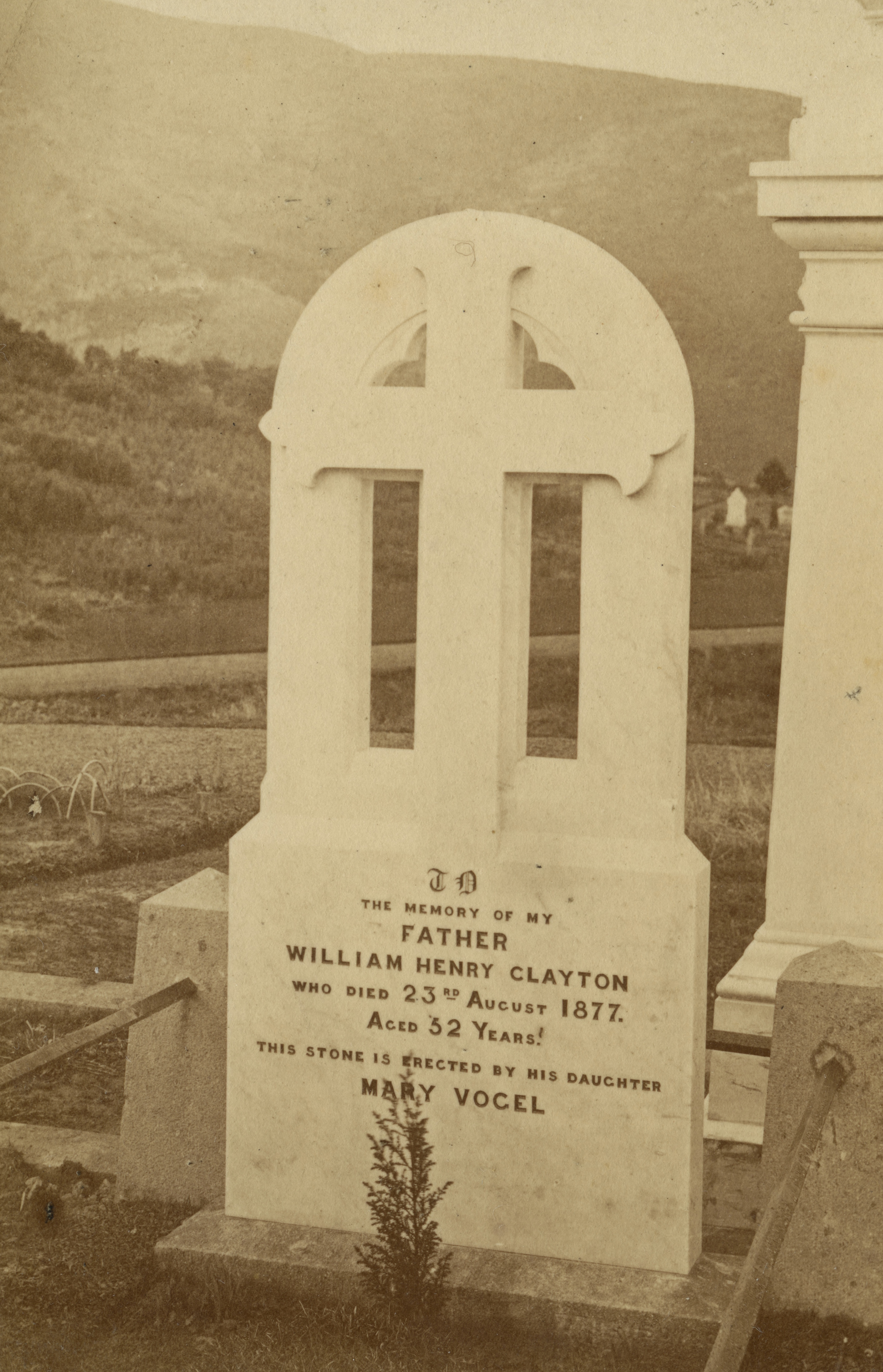
Clayton's headstone

While on a visit to Dunedin in 1865, the horse that was pulling the carriage he was travelling on bolted. While jumping clear he broke two bones in his left ankle and dislocated his right ankle. In 1877, Clayton travelled south to Christchurch and Dunedin to value the buildings of the former old provincial councils. While in Dunedin his old ankle injury gave trouble and an abscess developed which became so infected that Dr Thomas Hocken, who was attending him, strongly advised amputation. Seven days after his foot was amputated Clayton died of exhaustion at 4am on 23 August 1877.

He was buried in block 116 plot 12 in Dunedin's Northern Cemetery the following day. His wife, Emily who was in England visiting their daughter Mary Vogel at the time of his death returned to New Zealand to settle her husband's estate. He hadn't updated his will (which was still held in Tasmania) since 1860 and so it made no mention of his youngest children and situation in New Zealand. It wasn't until the New Zealand Public Trustee was appointed in March 1878 to administer the will that process could be made on settling his affairs.

After her husband affairs had been settled, Emily returned to London where she spent the rest of her life.

Following Clayton's death, his chief draughtsman Pierre Finch Martineau Burrows took over running of the office, though he was never appointed to the position of Colonial Architect.

== Personal life ==
Clayton married Emily Mary Samson on 7 October 1847 in Clapham, Surrey. William and Mary had the following children:

- Mary “Polly” Clayton (18 February 1849 – 12 August 1933). On 19 March 1867 she married her parents' neighbour Julius Vogel.
- Frances Clayton (born in about 1852). Married Montagu Charles Lamb Pym in 1875.
- George Clayton (1853– ).
- William Henry Clayton (17 July 1857– ).
- Kate Emily Clayton (27 January 1860– ). Married Alfred Nathan.
- Leonard Clayton (1862– ).
- Herbert Mason Clayton (5 December 1864– ). Born in Dunedin.

== Memorials ==
The William Clayton Building at 133 Molesworth Street in Wellington was originally named after him. Designed by the Government Architect for the Government Office Accommodation Board, it opened in 1983. It has subsequently been renamed.

== Works ==
Among the buildings which Clayton personally designed, collaborated on or supervised the design of are:

Building	Image	Completed	Location	Notes
St Andrew's Kirk		1850	36 St John Street, Launceston	Designed in 1849 with construction starting that same year.
Belltower, St Andrew's Anglican Church		1859	Westbury	A belltower designed by Clayton was added in 1859 to the existing church.
Chalmers Presbyterian Church		1860	Corner of Frederick and St John Streets, Launceston	
Launceston Mechanics' Institute		1860	Corner of St John and Cameron Streets, Launceston	Designed in 1856, with the foundation stone laid in 1857. The building was demolished in 1971.
Public Buildings		1860	Corner of St John and Cameron Streets, Launceston	Constructed 1859–1860.
St Mark's Anglican Church		1860	Deloraine, Tasmania	Designed by Clayton in the Gothic Revival style, the foundation stone was laid in 1856 and the church was consecrated in 1860.
Lisburn House		1863	15 Lisburn Avenue, Caversham, Dunedin	Clayton designed this townhouse for the Fulton family. It features very steeply gabled roof with multiple rooflines and polychromatic brickwork. It was given Heritage New Zealand historic place Category I status in 1988.
Dunedin Synagogue		1864	29 Moray Place; Tennyson Street, Dunedin	Commissioned in 1863 this was Clayton's first major project in New Zealand. When Clayton became a partner of William Mason, he brought with him this commission. It was given Heritage New Zealand historic place Category I status in 2012.
Oamaru Post Office		1864	12 Thames Street, Oamaru	Constructed of Oamaru limestone. By the early 1880s the building was too small and its duties were transferred to a new larger building in October 1884. It was given Heritage New Zealand historic place Category I status in 1988.
All Saints' Church, Dunedin		1865	776 Cumberland Street, North Dunedin, Dunedin	The nave of this Anglican church was designed by Clayton and built in 1865, while the transepts and chancel which were added in 1873 were designed by William Mason.
Colonial Museum		1865	Museum Street, Wellington	This small wooden building was constructed by September 1865behind the New Zealand Parliament. was built. A wing was subsequently added in 1868 and further additions were made in 1871 and 1873. The Colonial Museum became known as the Dominion Museum in 1907. The museum moved from the building when a new museum was opened on Mt Cook in 1936.
Edinburgh House		1865	Bond Street, Dunedin	This was a bond store, where imported goods were kept prior to the payment of the appropriate duties. The building was demolished in 1983.
Excelsior Hotel		1865	1–33 Dowling Street and 152, 158 Princes Street, Dunedin	It was given Heritage New Zealand historic place Category II status in 1986.
Government House, Wellington		1871	Molesworth Street, Wellington	This large timber mansion designed by Clayton in the Italianate style was lived in by successive Governors until it was taken for use as the Parliamentary Debating Chamber after the 1907 fire that destroyed the neighbouring General Assembly building. After that, the house became the Parliamentary restaurant, Bellamy's, until it was demolished in 1969 to make way for the present Executive Wing of Parliament Buildings, also known as the Beehive.
Mataura Post and Telegraph Office		1870	Mataura	This no longer survives.
Arrowtown Post and Telegraph Office		1871	Arrowtown	This building which used Clayton's generic Gothic government building was subsequently destroyed by fire. It was replaced by a new building in 1915.
Russell Customhouse		1870	37 The Strand, Russell	This two-storey building was constructed largely of kauri. It was given Heritage New Zealand historic place Category I status in 2007.
Foxton Post and Telegraph Office		1871	Main Street, Foxton	
Reefton Courthouse		1872	47 Bridge Street, Reefton	It was given Heritage New Zealand historic place Category I status in 1990.
Burnham Industrial School		1873	Burnham Military Camp	This is now a squash court.
Caversham Immigration Barracks		1873	2, 4, 6, 8 Elbe Street, Mornington, Dunedin	It was given Heritage New Zealand historic place Category I status in 2019.
Finnimore House		1873	Corner of Finnimore Terrace and Dransfield Road, Wellington	This was designed and gifted by Clayton to his draughter Mary and her husband.
Clayton House		1874	53 Hobson Street, Thorndon, Wellington	Clayton bought land from Maori at Pipitea Pa and built his own house, which he constructed of concrete, possibly making it the first concrete dwelling in Wellington. It also had hot and cold running water, another novelty. Following Clayton's death it was sold to Thomas Coldham Williams who transformed it into a grand mansion, complete with Italianate tower. In 1916 it became the home of Scots College and then Queen Margaret College from 1919 onwards. It was given Heritage New Zealand historic place Category II status in 1982.
Premier House		1875	260 Tinakori Road, Thorndon, Wellington	The original privately owned house was purchased in 1865 to become the official residence of the nation's Premier. Clayton designed an addition which is substantially the two storied, late Victorian Italianate style timber building that is seen today. As prime minister Michael Joseph Savage didn't want to live in such grandeur the building was for a time used as a trainee dental clinic. After coming under threat of demolition it was saved and restored in 1990 and is today the official home of the prime minister of New Zealand. It was given Heritage New Zealand historic place Category I status in 1988.
Naseby Courthouse		1875	18 Derwent Street, Naseby	This was based upon Clayton's standard court house design. It was given Heritage New Zealand historic place category 2 status in 2008.
Napier Courthouse		1875	59 Marine Parade, Napier	Following the issue of tenders in November 1873 the building was constructed between 1874 and 1875. The courthouse survived the 1931 Napier earthquake. It was given Heritage New Zealand historic place Category II status in 1990.
Invercargill Post & Telegraph Office		1876	Invercargill	tenderers for its construction were called in January 1875. The Telegraph Office moved into the upper floor of the eastern wing on the 15 July 1876.
Rawene Courthouse		1876	4 Parnell Street, Rawene	Single-storey, gabled shingle roofed kauri timber Italianate styled building. It was given Heritage New Zealand historic place Category II status in 1982.
Government Buildings, Wellington		1876	55 Lambton Quay, Wellington	Considered one of New Zealand's most important historic buildings it was until 1998 the world's second largest timber office building. It was given Heritage New Zealand historic place Category I status in 1982.
Havelock Post Office		1876	61 Main Road, Havelock, Marlborough	This single-storey building was built of kauri with a steeply pitched gabled roof. It was given Heritage New Zealand historic place Category I status in 1983.
Lyttelton Post and Telegraph Office		1877	Corner of Oxford Street and Norwich Quay, Lyttelton	The building was demolished in 2011 due to damage from the 2011 Christchurch earthquake.
Timaru Courthouse		1878	14 North Street, Timaru	Tenders for a new courthouse were called in 1876 and then again in March 1877. It was given Heritage New Zealand historic place Category I status in 2003.
Chief Post Office, Christchurch		1879	31 Cathedral Square, Christchurch	This Italianate style building combining classical and Venetian Gothic elements was designed by William Clayton in conjunction with P.F.M Burrows. The design was completed in January 1877 and the foundation stone was laid three months before Clayton's death. It was given Heritage New Zealand historic place Category I status in 1985.
Dunedin North Post Office		1879	361 Great King Street, North Dunedin, Dunedin	Designed by Clayton and completed following his death. As of 2019 it houses the H. D. Skinner Annex of Otago Museum. It was given Heritage New Zealand historic place Category II status in 2005.
Akaroa Courthouse		1880	69 Rue Lavaud, Akaroa	Designed by Clayton just before his death. It was given Heritage New Zealand historic place Category I status in 1983.
