= Pipitea, New Zealand =

Suburb of Wellington City, New Zealand

Pipitea
- Suburb
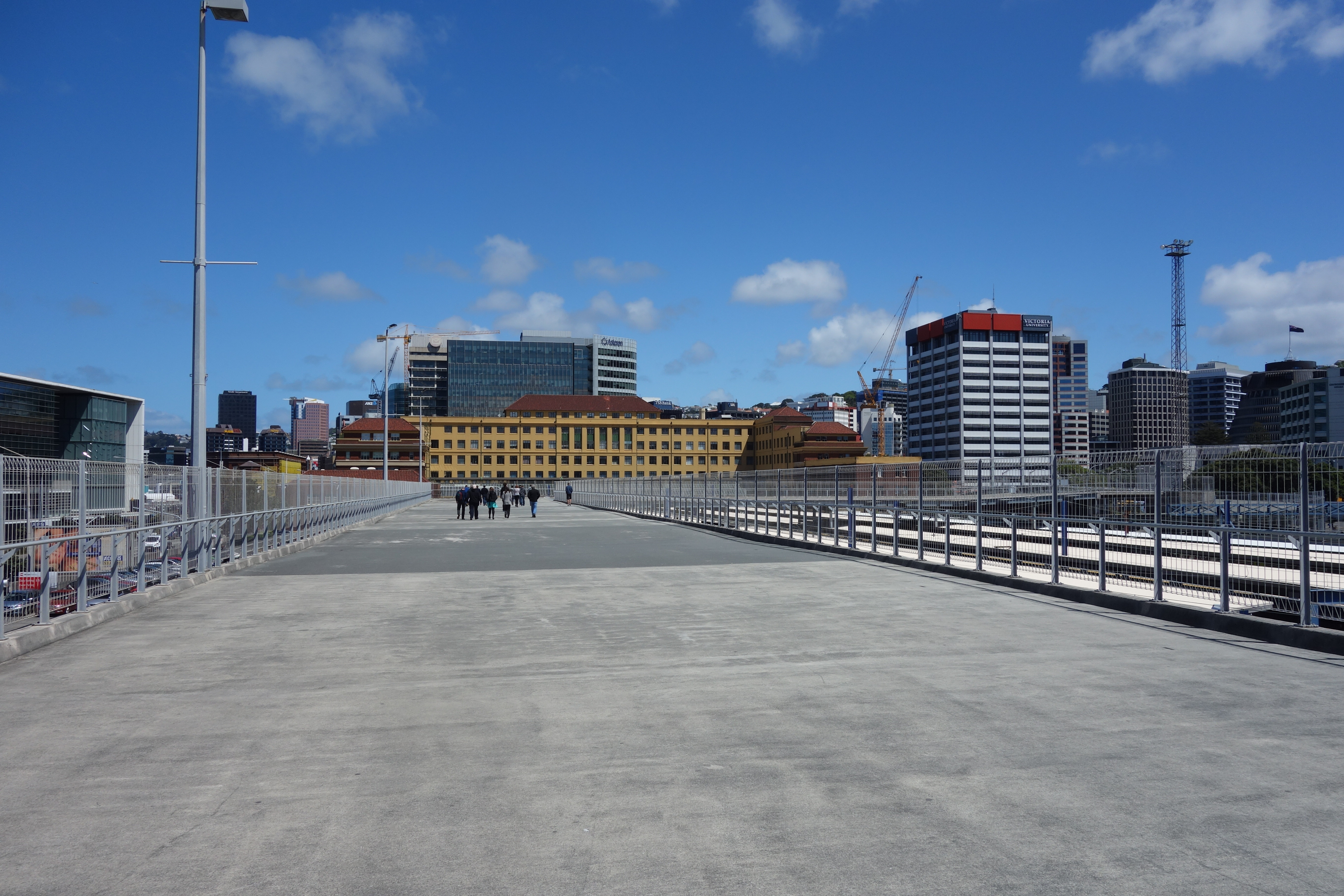
- View of Pipitea from above Wellington railway station
- Interactive map of Pipitea
- Coordinates: 41.274466°S 174.783599°E
- Country: New Zealand
- City: Wellington City
- Local authority: Wellington City Council
- Electoral ward: Pukehīnau/Lambton General Ward; Te Whanganui-a-Tara Māori Ward

Area
  - Land: 140 ha (350 acres)

Population (2023)
  - Total: 567
  - Density: 410/km^{2} (1,000/sq mi)

Wadestown	Kaiwharawhara
Thorndon	Pipitea	(Wellington Harbour)
Wellington Central

Pipitea is a central suburb of Wellington, in the Wellington Region of New Zealand's North Island.

== Geography ==
The new suburb of Pipitea was created and its boundaries were fixed at a meeting of the full Wellington City Council on 20 August 2003. After that time suburb changes must receive the further consent of the New Zealand Geographic Board.

The territory

The territory is the sites of Pipitea Pā and Old St Paul's on the inland side of Thorndon Quay, the reclaimed land east and south of Thorndon Quay and Hutt Road from along the shoreline from Kaiwharawhara to Whitmore Street, and the Government Centre bounded by Kate Sheppard Place (formerly Sydney Street East), Hill Street, Sydney Street West, Bowen Street and the reclaimed land.

== Demographics ==
=== Pipitea ===
Pipitea, comprising the statistical areas of 7021520, 7034858, 7034859 and 7034927, covers 1.40 km^{2} (0.54 sq mi). It is part of the larger Pipitea-Kaiwharawhara statistical area.

Historical population for Pipitea
Year	Pop.	±% p.a.
2006	444	—
2013	630	+5.13%
2018	639	+0.28%
2023	567	−2.36%
The 2006 population is for a smaller area of 1.38 km^{2}. Source:

Pipitea had a population of 567 in the 2023 New Zealand census, a decrease of 72 people (−11.3%) since the 2018 census, and a decrease of 63 people (−10.0%) since the 2013 census. There were 291 males, 270 females, and 9 people of other genders in 288 dwellings. 9.0% of people identified as LGBTIQ+. There were 30 people (5.3%) aged under 15 years, 186 (32.8%) aged 15 to 29, 279 (49.2%) aged 30 to 64, and 66 (11.6%) aged 65 or older.

People could identify as more than one ethnicity. The results were 72.5% European (Pākehā); 10.1% Māori; 4.8% Pasifika; 19.6% Asian; 2.6% Middle Eastern, Latin American and African New Zealanders (MELAA); and 2.1% other, which includes people giving their ethnicity as "New Zealander". English was spoken by 98.4%, Māori by 3.7%, and other languages by 22.8%. No language could be spoken by 0.5% (e.g. too young to talk). The percentage of people born overseas was 34.4, compared with 28.8% nationally.

Religious affiliations were 25.9% Christian, 3.2% Hindu, 1.1% Māori religious beliefs, 1.6% Buddhist, and 2.6% other religions. People who answered that they had no religion were 58.7%, and 5.8% of people did not answer the census question.

Of those at least 15 years old, 273 (50.8%) people had a bachelor's or higher degree, 207 (38.5%) had a post-high school certificate or diploma, and 63 (11.7%) people exclusively held high school qualifications. 153 people (28.5%) earned over $100,000 compared to 12.1% nationally. The employment status of those at least 15 was 387 (72.1%) full-time, 60 (11.2%) part-time, and 12 (2.2%) unemployed.

=== Pipitea-Kaiwharawhara ===
Pipitea-Kaiwharawhara statistical area also includes the largely industrial suburb of Kaiwharawhara and covers 2.22 km^{2} (0.86 sq mi). It had an estimated population of 950 as of June 2025, with a population density of 428 people per km^{2}.

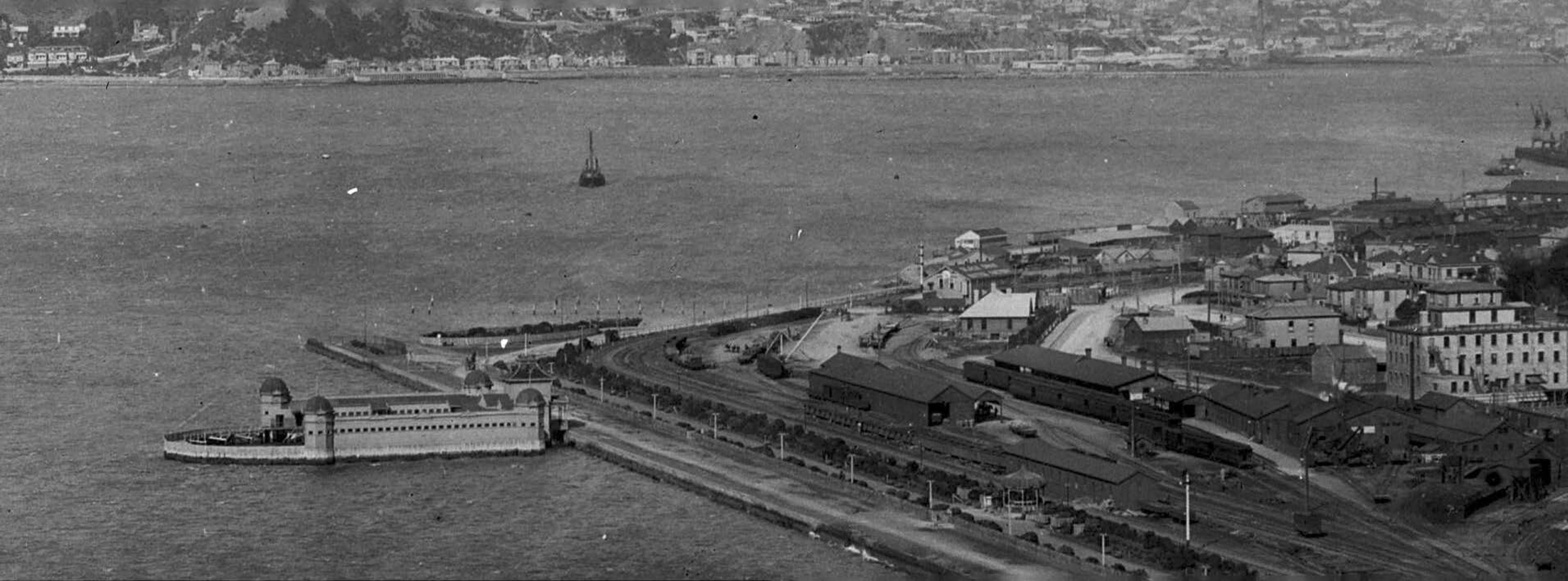
Pipitea Point circa 1905

Historical population for Pipitea-Kaiwharawhara
Year	Pop.	±% p.a.
2006	597	—
2013	849	+5.16%
2018	960	+2.49%
2023	933	−0.57%

Pipitea-Kaiwharawhara had a population of 933 in the 2023 New Zealand census, a decrease of 27 people (−2.8%) since the 2018 census, and an increase of 84 people (9.9%) since the 2013 census. There were 459 males, 459 females, and 18 people of other genders in 411 dwellings. 9.0% of people identified as LGBTIQ+. The median age was 37.2 years (compared with 38.1 years nationally). There were 84 people (9.0%) aged under 15 years, 276 (29.6%) aged 15 to 29, 456 (48.9%) aged 30 to 64, and 117 (12.5%) aged 65 or older.

People could identify as more than one ethnicity. The results were 75.2% European (Pākehā); 12.2% Māori; 3.9% Pasifika; 20.6% Asian; 2.6% Middle Eastern, Latin American and African New Zealanders (MELAA); and 1.9% other, which includes people giving their ethnicity as "New Zealander". English was spoken by 97.7%, Māori by 2.6%, and other languages by 23.5%. No language could be spoken by 1.0% (e.g. too young to talk). New Zealand Sign Language was known by 0.3%. The percentage of people born overseas was 33.4, compared with 28.8% nationally.

Religious affiliations were 26.7% Christian, 5.5% Hindu, 0.6% Islam, 1.0% Māori religious beliefs, 1.3% Buddhist, 0.3% New Age, 0.3% Jewish, and 2.9% other religions. People who answered that they had no religion were 55.6%, and 5.8% of people did not answer the census question.

Of those at least 15 years old, 453 (53.4%) people had a bachelor's or higher degree, 303 (35.7%) had a post-high school certificate or diploma, and 90 (10.6%) people exclusively held high school qualifications. The median income was $75,100, compared with $41,500 nationally. 294 people (34.6%) earned over $100,000 compared to 12.1% nationally. The employment status of those at least 15 was 582 (68.6%) full-time, 96 (11.3%) part-time, and 15 (1.8%) unemployed.

== Economy ==
=== Retail ===
The Capital Gateway Centre shopping precinct has 13 stores, including Freedom Furniture.

Pipitea Marae

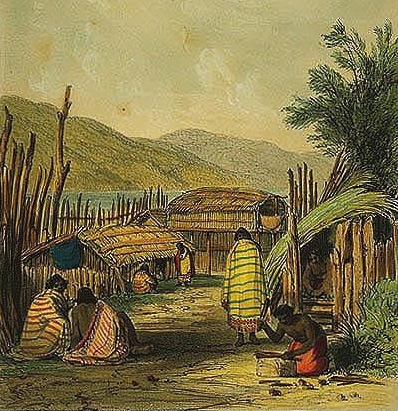
Pipitea Pā

== Pipitea Pā ==
Pipitea Pā was originally built by Ngāti Mutunga in the mid 1820's but from 1835 onwards Te Āti Awa occupied the Pā. The Pā was close to a fresh water source and its occupants cultivated the lands surrounding it.

=== Pipitea Marae ===
Part of the previous pā site opened in 1980 as an urban marae. The site transferred to Te Āti Awa and Taranaki Whānui as part of the local Treaty Settlement in 2009. Pipitea Marae and its meeting house, Te Upoko o te Ika a Māui, is a meeting place for Taranaki Whānui ki te Upoko o te Ika and Te Āti Awa. The marae was built by Ngāti Pōneke.
