= Reclamation of Wellington Harbour =

Land creation in New Zealand

An animation showing the phases of reclamation by year in Wellington Harbour.

Reclamation of Wellington Harbour started in the 1850s, in order to increase the amount of usable land for the then new City of Wellington. Flat land plots in the early city were scarce, with little room for public buildings and parks, as well as inadequate dockside areas for shipping. Reclamation progressively advanced into the harbour throughout the 19th and 20th centuries, providing room for public, commercial and industrial areas for the city. Large reclamations were made in the 1960s and 1970s to meet the demands of container shipping and new cargo handling methods.

For over 100 years, development was largely overseen by the Wellington Harbour Board, formed in 1880. As one of the outcomes of the 1989 local government reforms, an operating company called Port of Wellington (now CentrePort Wellington) was formed. At the time it commenced operation in 1989, it owned approximately 72 ha (180 acres) of Wellington waterfront property including wharves. The remainder of the Wellington waterfront area from Shed 21 to Clyde Quay Wharf, including all the buildings, was transferred to Wellington City Council. Since then, the formerly industrial waterfront has been converted into office space and public areas. Reclamation has added more than 155 hectares to Wellington.

== Establishment of Wellington ==
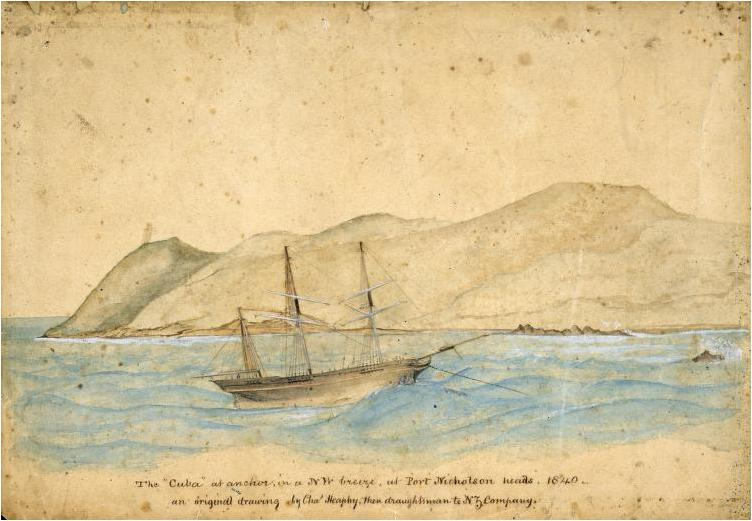
The Cuba anchored in Wellington Harbour by Charles Heaphy.

A plan for the New Zealand Company's new settlement of Britannia at Pito-one (Petone) had been prepared in England by Samuel Cobham. The key elements of his city were a large amount of flat land on the shores of a harbour, traversable by a navigable river. When surveyors arrived in 1840 on the Cuba led by Captain William Mein Smith, it was determined that the Hutt River was not navigable and, due to its tendency to flood, was not appropriate to support a major city. For these reasons the new settlement was relocated to the southern shores of Port Nicholson and renamed Wellington.

Edward Gibbon Wakefield of the New Zealand Company had devised a system of "packages" of land for colonists of one town acre each. Cobham's Britannia consisted of 1100 1-acre (4,000 m^{2}) town sections, which William Mein Smith struggled to fit into the new location. These sections were squeezed into the available space by sacrificing many of the planned amenities such as parks, reserves, ports, libraries and many other public areas identified in the original plan. For this reason, from Wellington's outset, there was a need for extra land.

== 19th century reclamations ==
Map of proposed reclamation of the area on the harbour side of Lambton Quay from 1851

Two men fishing off the reclamations at Te Aro, in the vicinity of Cable Street, Wellington. Photograph taken circa. 1910.

=== Early reclamations ===
While large scale reclamation began in the 1850s, the earliest reclamations in Wellington were conducted by private citizens. A popular story of the first reclamation conducted in Wellington was that done by George Bennet. Bennet had arrived in 1848 on the Berenicia and purchased a hilly section at Windy, or Clay Point (what is now the corner of Lambton Quay and Willis Street). At that time, Windy Point was a precipice with a narrow and often impassible path connecting Willis Street to Beach Road (now Lambton Quay). Bennet commenced, to the amusement of neighbours, with pick-axe, shovel and barrow to move earth from the Point, tossing the spoil onto the path and into the harbour, thus widening the track and performing Wellington's first reclamation.

A programme of systematic reclamation began in 1852, overseen by the provincial government. Charles Carter completed a 360' x 100' extension below Willis Street at a cost of £1,036.

In 1855, the magnitude 8.2 Wairarapa earthquake uplifted the northwestern side of Wellington bay (in some places up to 1.5 metres). This created a tidal swamp, and rendered many of the existing jetties in the harbour unusable. Most of this land was subsequently reclaimed, providing an excellent new rail and road route to the north. Another result of the newly raised land in Wellington was that the shipping basin planned for the city was abandoned and the land then used for a cricket ground, the Basin Reserve.

=== Establishment of the Wellington Harbour Board ===
The Wellington City Council was inaugurated in 1870, and by the end of the 1870s some 70 acres (280,000 m^{2}) of land had been reclaimed using spoil from the hills behind Lambton Quay and from Wadestown Hill.

In 1880, the Wellington Harbour Board was established to manage and develop the harbour and its facilities. From then on reclamation work was divided between the Harbour Board, the Government and the City Council. Among major developments from 1880 to the turn of the century was reclamation north of Pipitea Point for railways land and south of Queens Wharf to Te Aro by the City Council. This removed the last vestiges of private ownership of the foreshore, putting the waterfront under the control of the Harbour Board.

By the end of the 19th century, the original 1840 shoreline was unrecognisable.

== 20th century reclamations ==
Reclamation in Thorndon circa 1925

From 1900 to 1930 further reclamations were made for railways and Harbour Board purposes. Additional wharves and the seawall at Oriental Bay were built, and the boat harbour at Clyde Quay was constructed.

=== Thorndon reclamations ===
An 1875-78 Thorndon Reclamation provided space for streets and government offices.

Another started in January 1924, to provide space for a new railway goods yard, a wider railway approach to the new station, a new road, more shipping berths and a floating dock. A 3,879 ft (1,182 m) concrete sea-wall was built to enclose the area, 8 ft (2.4 m) above low water, and with foundations 27 ft (8.2 m) to 53 ft (16 m) below low water, with a base width of 18 ft 9 in (5.72 m) to 30 ft 6 in (9.30 m). The dredger Whakarire and drag-suction dredge Kaione filled the area with sand, shells and gravel, before a top layer of clay, broken bricks and concrete was added, starting from the north. The area for the floating dock was dredged to 46 ft (14 m) below low water, some of it blasted out. The last part of the reclamation was the Aotea Quay Breastwork, completed in February 1940.

=== 1960s and container shipping ===
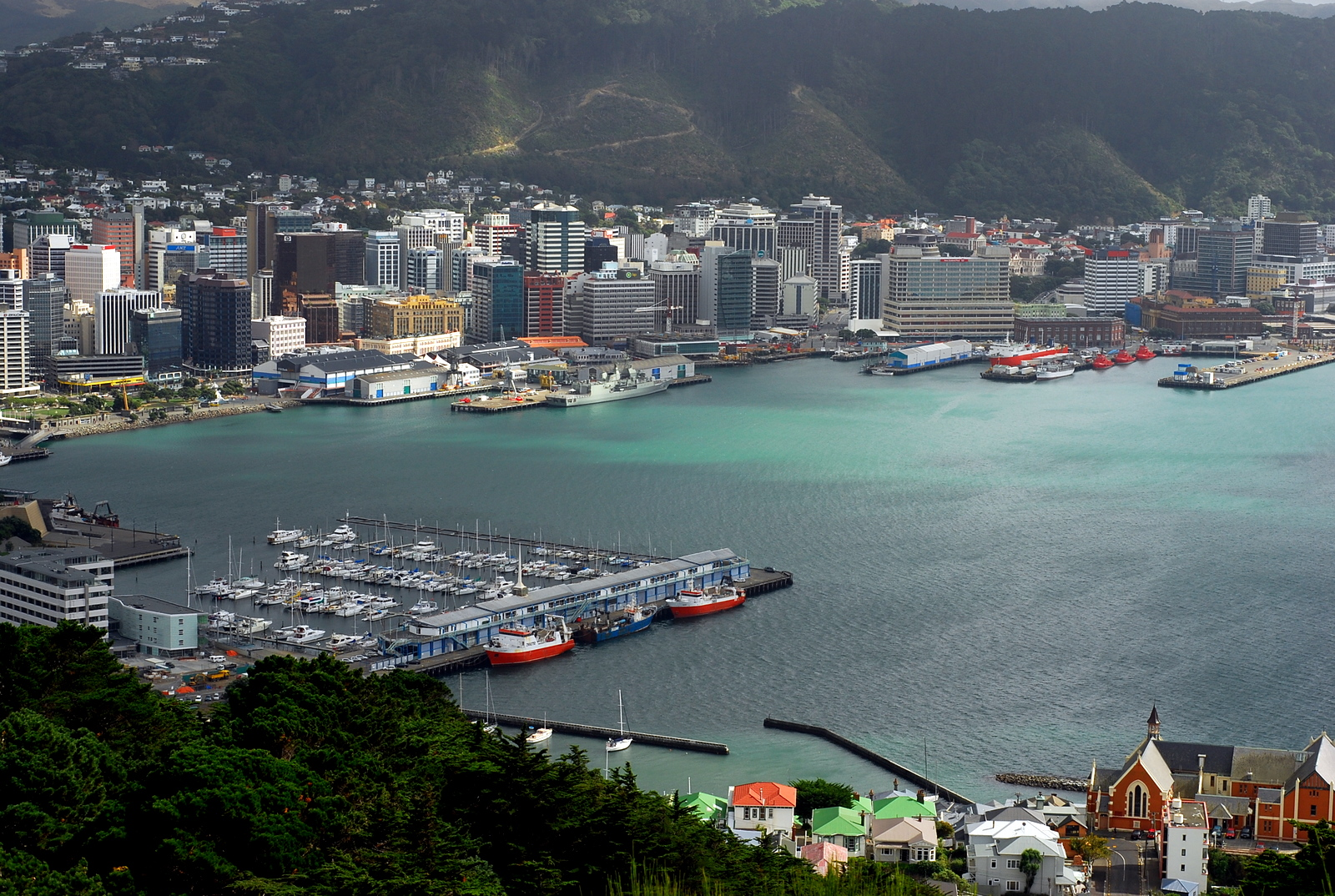
The harbour as it looks today from Mount Victoria

The final phase of reclamation took place in the 1960s and 1970s. A government report in 1967 recommended the adoption of containerisation and that Wellington should be one of the two New Zealand container ports. With containerisation came new roll-on/roll-off cargo handling methods that require more land adjacent to ships' berths. This resulted in the start of an extension to the Aotea Quay reclamation. Reclamation was carried out on both sides of Queens Wharf and the Wellington Harbour Board Container Terminal was created by a large reclamation at Thorndon.

The first container ship berthed on 19 June 1971. The container terminal has 24.3 hectares of back-up space capable of holding 6,284 containers.

=== Evans Bay ===
Land along the western side of Evans Bay, a large bay in Wellington Harbour, was reclaimed from the early 1900s to create what is now Evans Bay Parade, and in 1906 spoil from the lowering of Constable Street and construction of the Hataitai tram tunnel was used to reclaim land from shallow mudflats at the head of Evans Bay. Further reclamation until the 1920s created Kilbirnie Park. Land was also reclaimed at Greta Point. In the 1950s another big reclamation project took place at the head of Evans Bay as part of the works for the new Wellington Airport. Cobham Drive was built on the newly reclaimed land.

== Port reforms ==
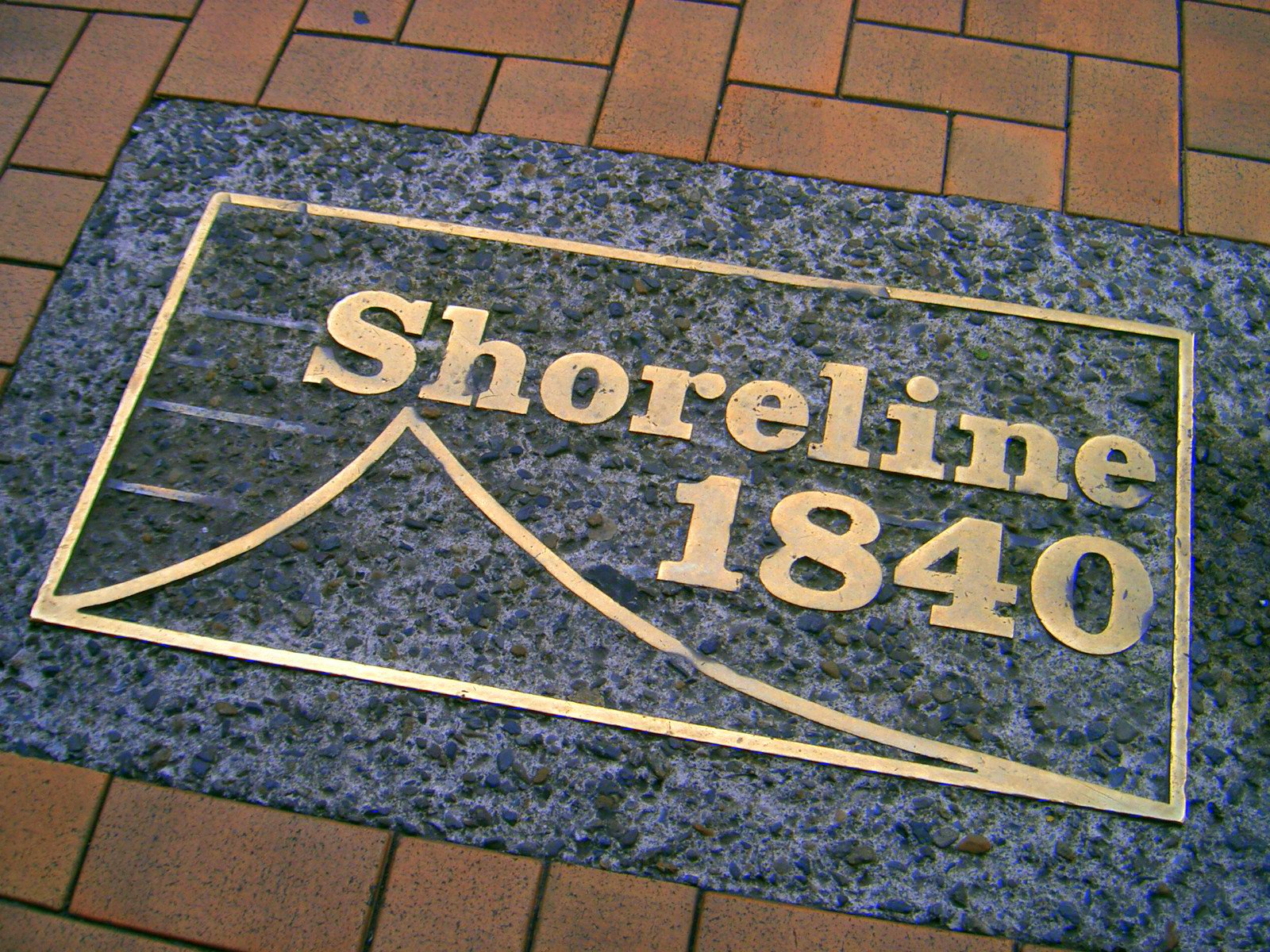
A plaque laid by the Historic Places Trust to mark Wellington's original shoreline

The Wellington Harbour Board was disestablished after the passing of the Port Companies Act 1988 and the Local Government Act 1989, as part of the 1989 local government reforms. Operational port assets were transferred to a new company called Port of Wellington. Ownership of the Port of Wellington company was vested in Greater Wellington Regional Council, and Horizons Regional Council. When the port company was formed, it owned approximately 72 ha (180 acres) of Wellington waterfront property including wharves. The remainder of the Wellington waterfront area, from Shed 21 to Clyde Quay Wharf, including all the buildings, was transferred to Wellington City Council.

Port of Wellington changed its name to Port Wellington in 1997 and then to CentrePort Wellington in May 1999, to emphasise the fact that the port is in the centre of New Zealand and able to serve a large geographical area.

== Marking the original shoreline ==
In 1976, the Historic Places Trust placed 14 plaques along the original shoreline. These plaques run from Pipitea Point, along Lambton Quay, through Mercer Street, lower Cuba Street, Wakefield Street to Oriental Parade at the northern corner of Herd Street.

== Timeline of reclamations ==
From the New Zealand Electronic Text Centre:

Year/s	Location	Area
1852	Willis Street, Mercer Street, Chew's Lane, Bonds	
1857-63	Bank of N.Z., corner Willis Street and Lambton Quay (Noah's Ark site), Harris Street to Grey Street	7 acres (28,000 m^{2})
1859	Oddfellows' Hall site	
1864	Foresters' Lodge site	
1865	Messrs. Jacob Joseph, between Waring Taylor and Stout Streets and Lambton Quay	total of last three, 2 rods
1866–67	Panama, Brandon, Johnston and Waring Taylor Streets, pts. Featherston Street and Customhouse Quay	12 acres (49,000 m^{2})
1875	Government Building site	2 acres (8,100 m^{2})
1876	Government (Lambton) railway station and lines, Featherston Street extension, Ballance, Stout, Bunny and Whitmore Streets, Govt. Printing Office and “Shacks” (this was extended to Pipitea Point)	46 acres (190,000 m^{2})
1882	Manawatu (Thorndon) railway station and lines	29 acres (120,000 m^{2})
1882	Railway Wharf	1 rod
1884	Davis Street Extension	
1886	Hunter Street endowment, Customhouse Quay and Hunter Street	3 rods
1886	Victoria and Wakefield Streets	22 acres (89,000 m^{2})
1889	Jervois Quay	17 acres (69,000 m^{2})
1893	Harbour Board store, and track for Te Aro railway, Customhouse Quay and Jervois Quay	1-acre (4,000 m^{2})
1893–1901	Waterloo Quay and Glasgow wharves	3 acres (12,000 m^{2})
1895	Council's yards, near Oriental Parade	1-acre (4,000 m^{2})
1901–03	From near Queen's Wharf to the Lyttelton Ferry Wharf, and site of Customhouse	2.5 acres (10,000 m^{2})
1901–1914	Barnet, Cable and Chaffers Street	18 acres (73,000 m^{2})
1902–1925	Clyde Quay widening	4 acres (16,000 m^{2})
1904	Hutt Road locality	
1904–1916	Waterloo and near Fryatt Quays, Hinemoa and Cornwall Streets	34 acres (140,000 m^{2})
1906	Waterloo Quay completion	34.5 acres (140,000 m^{2})
1906	Oriental Parade and boat shed sites	1-acre (4,000 m^{2})
1910–1913	Davis Street extension, near Cornwall Street	4 acres (16,000 m^{2})
1924–1927	Thorndon Esplanade and Hutt railway lines areas, vested in the Harbour Board and Railway Department	68.5 acres (27.7 ha)

== See also ==
- Southern Endowment
- Wharves in Wellington Harbour
