= Waimāpihi Stream =

Stream in Wellington, New Zealand

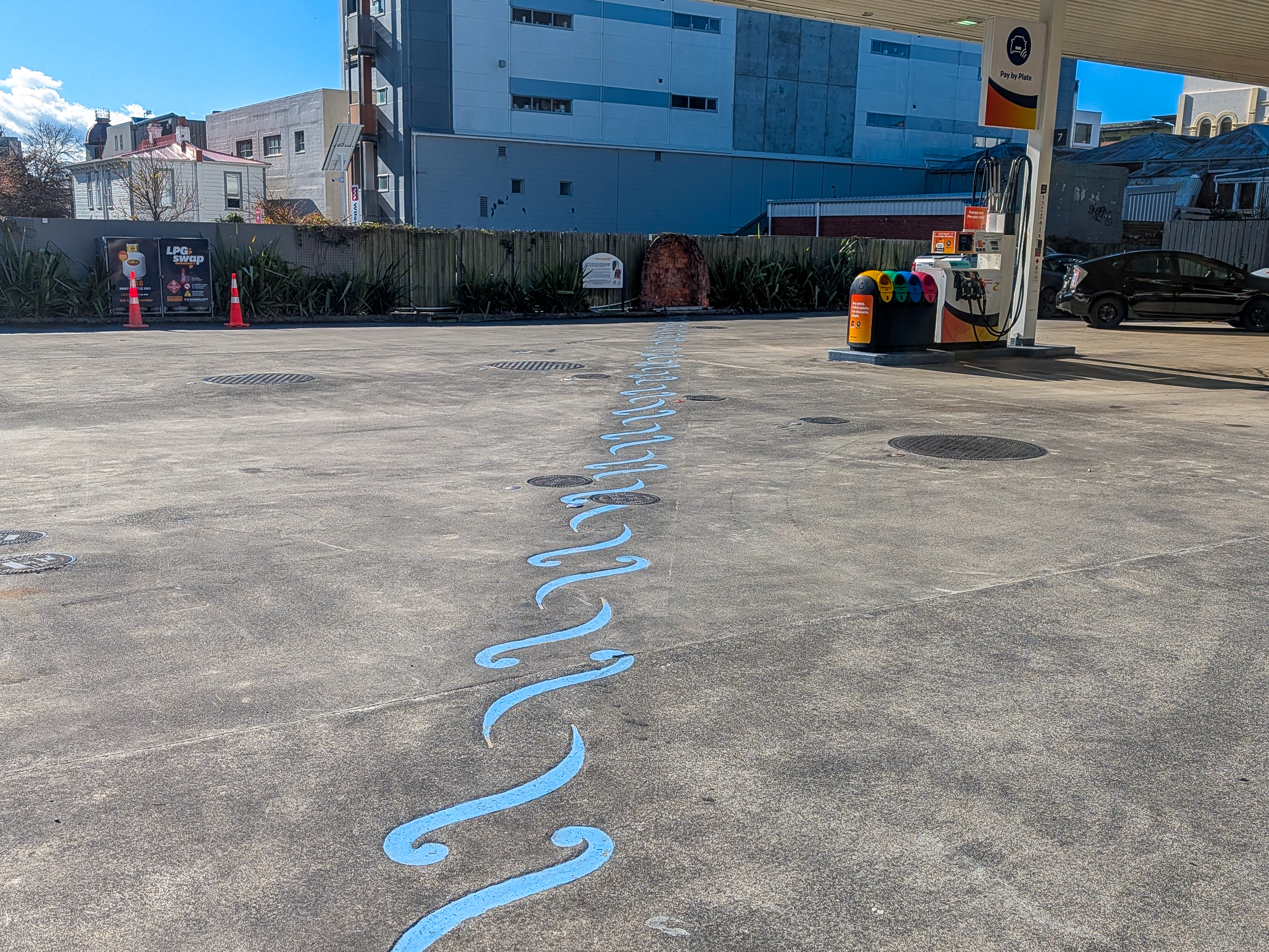
- Route of the Waimāpihi Stream
- Etymology: From the Māori "wai" ('water') + "Māpihi" (a historic rangatira) .
- Native name: Waimāpihi (Māori)

Location
- Country: New Zealand
- Island: North Island
- Region: Wellington
- District: Wellington

Physical characteristics
- Source: Waimāpihi Reserve
  - coordinates: 41.30344°S 174.75154°E
- Mouth: Wellington Harbour
  - location: Taranaki Street Wharf
  - coordinates: 41°17′23″S 174°46′49″E
  - elevation: Sea level

Basin features
- Progression: Waimāpihi Stream → Wellington Harbour → Cook Strait → Pacific Ocean
- Cities: Wellington
- Tributaries
  - right: Polhill Reserve Stream, Durham Street Stream, Tanera Park Stream

Waimāpihi Stream is an urban stream in Wellington, New Zealand. The stream was culverted underground in the 1880s. The stream's headwaters are in the Waimapihi Reserve (formerly Polhill Reserve), before running underground through pipes beneath Aro Valley and Te Aro to its outlet into Wellington Harbour at the Taranaki Street Wharf. It is named after Māpihi, a historic rangatira ('chieftain') who was said to have bathed in its headwaters.

== Route ==
The stream begins in the Waimapihi Reserve (formerly Polhill Reserve), a former rubbish tip between Zealandia and Brooklyn, before entering a culvert at the end of Holloway Road, Mitchelltown. From there, the stream flows underground along Aro Street and Palmer Street, crosses beneath Willis Street, Vivian Street, Ghuznee Street, Cuba Mall, Te Aro Park and the Quays, and enters the Wellington Harbour at the Taranaki Street Wharf.

== History ==
The Waimāpihi was a vital resource to Māori, with archaeological remains showing settlements along the stream dating back 600 years. The stream was considered sacred to the inhabitants of Te Aro Pā, who relied on it for food, drinking water, and irrigation.

Following the arrival of European settlers, the stream was used as a sewer. The spread of diseases from flooding, as well as the need for flatland to build on, lead to settlers culverting Waimāpihi and other streams in Wellington. Construction of the culvert began in 1880, and the majority of the stream had been piped underground by 1890.

In November 2012, the stream and remnants of its 19th-century culvert were discovered during the construction of a Z Energy petrol station on Vivian Street. An archaeological study at the construction site found middens from old Māori settlements dating back to the 15th-century. Blue koru patterns painted across the station's forecourt mark the stream's underground path, and in April 2013 Te Pikonga o Mapihi, a sculpture by Ra Vincent, was unveiled at the station. The sculpture, commemorating the stream, is constructed from red bricks recovered from the discovered culvert.

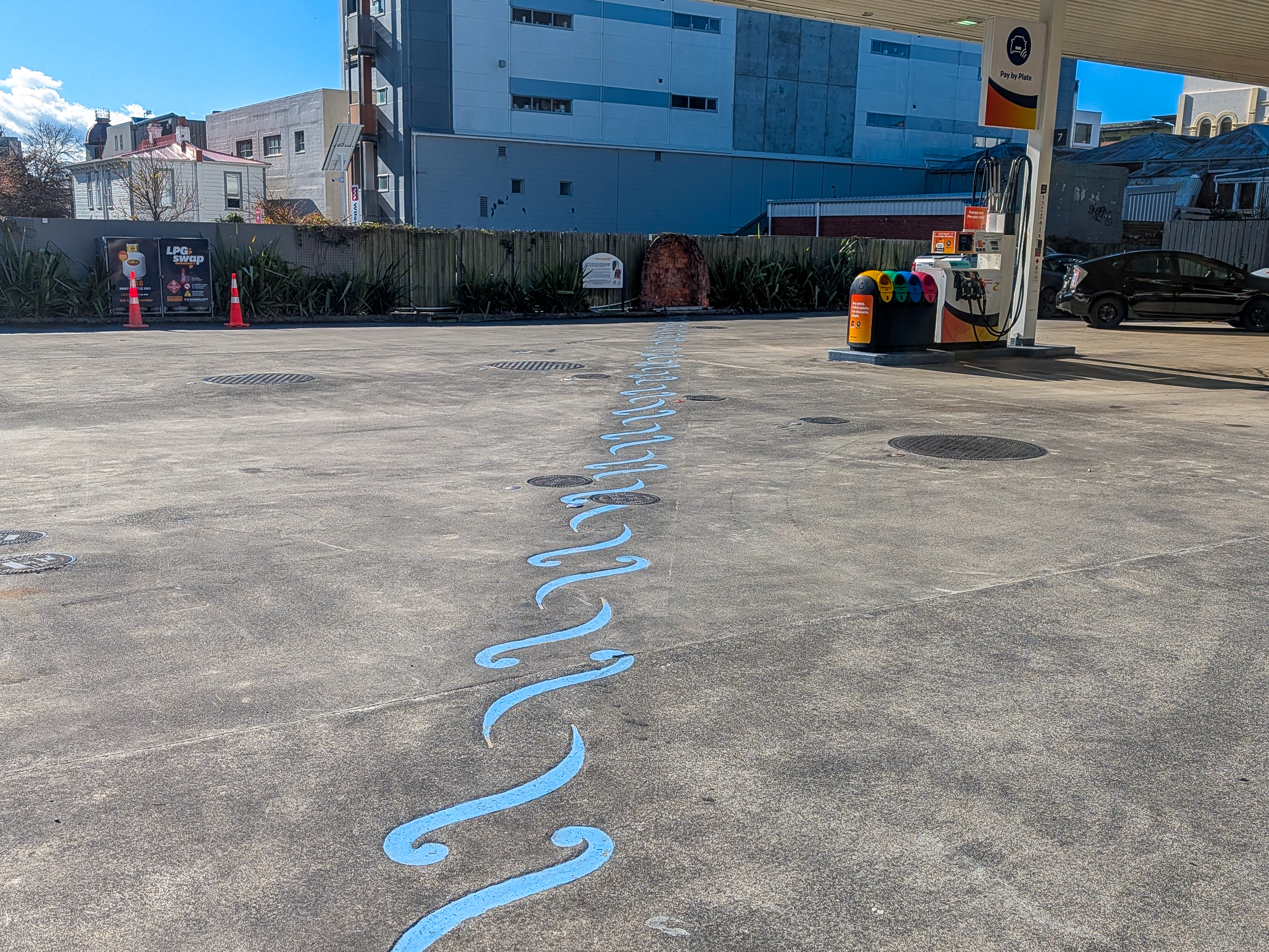
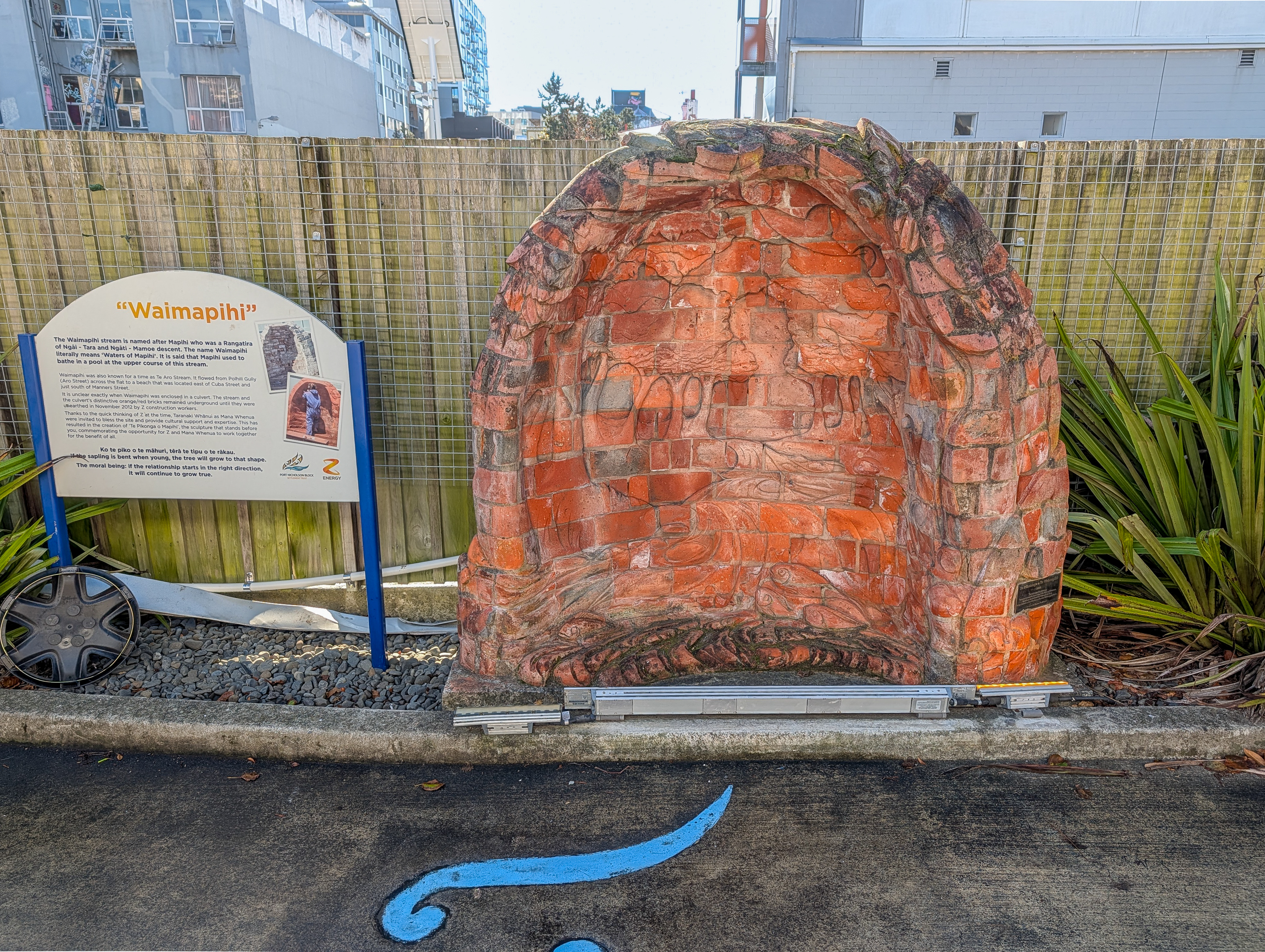
Blue koru on the forecourt of Z Energy Vivian Street mark the path of the stream. The koru lead to Te Pikonga o Mapihi, a sculpture by Ra Vincent constructed from bricks recovered from the culvert during the station's construction.

== Etymology ==
The stream is named after Māpihi, a female rangatira ('chieftain') of Ngāi Tara and Ngāti Mamoe descent who used to bathe in the upper stream. Wai is from the Māori word for 'water'. Separate murals along the stream's path at Aro Valley School and on Garrett Street pay tribute to Māpihi and the stream.

In the 1830s and 1840s, it was known as the "Te Aro River" or "Aro Stream" by European settlers, named after the Te Aro flat through which it ran.

== Ecology ==
Between 2016 and 2019, only two species of native fish were identified in Waimāpihi – banded kōkopu and koaro (climbing galaxias) – as well as native kōura (freshwater crayfish). Based on similar streams, Waimāpihi may once have been inhabited by additional species, including īnanga (common galaxias) and toitoi (common bully).

== See also ==
- List of rivers of Wellington Region
