= Ra Vincent =

New Zealand production designer and set decorator

- Occupations: Production designer Set decorator Sculptor
- Years active: 2001–present
- Website: ravincentworkshop.com

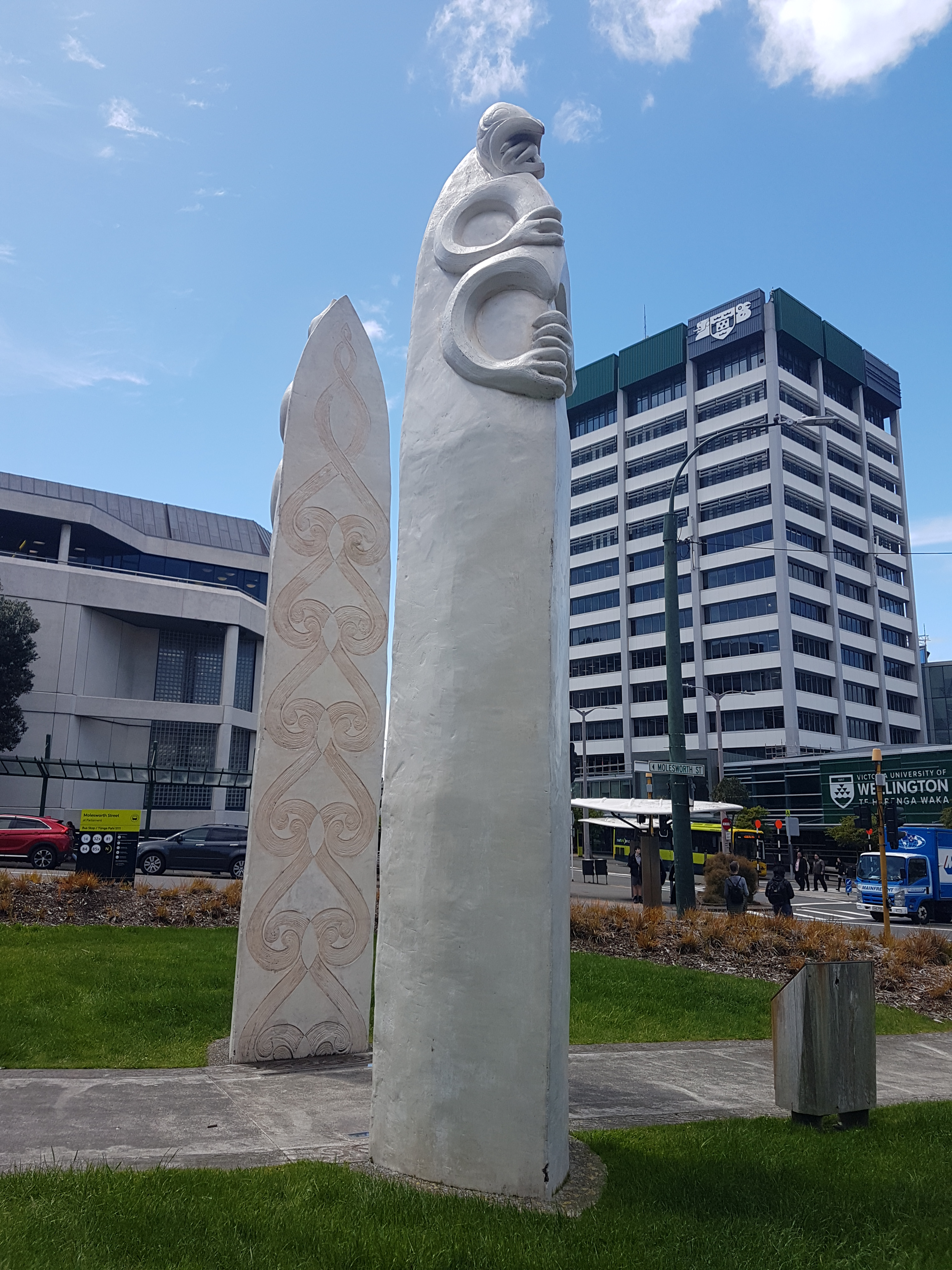
Pou Whenua (2004)

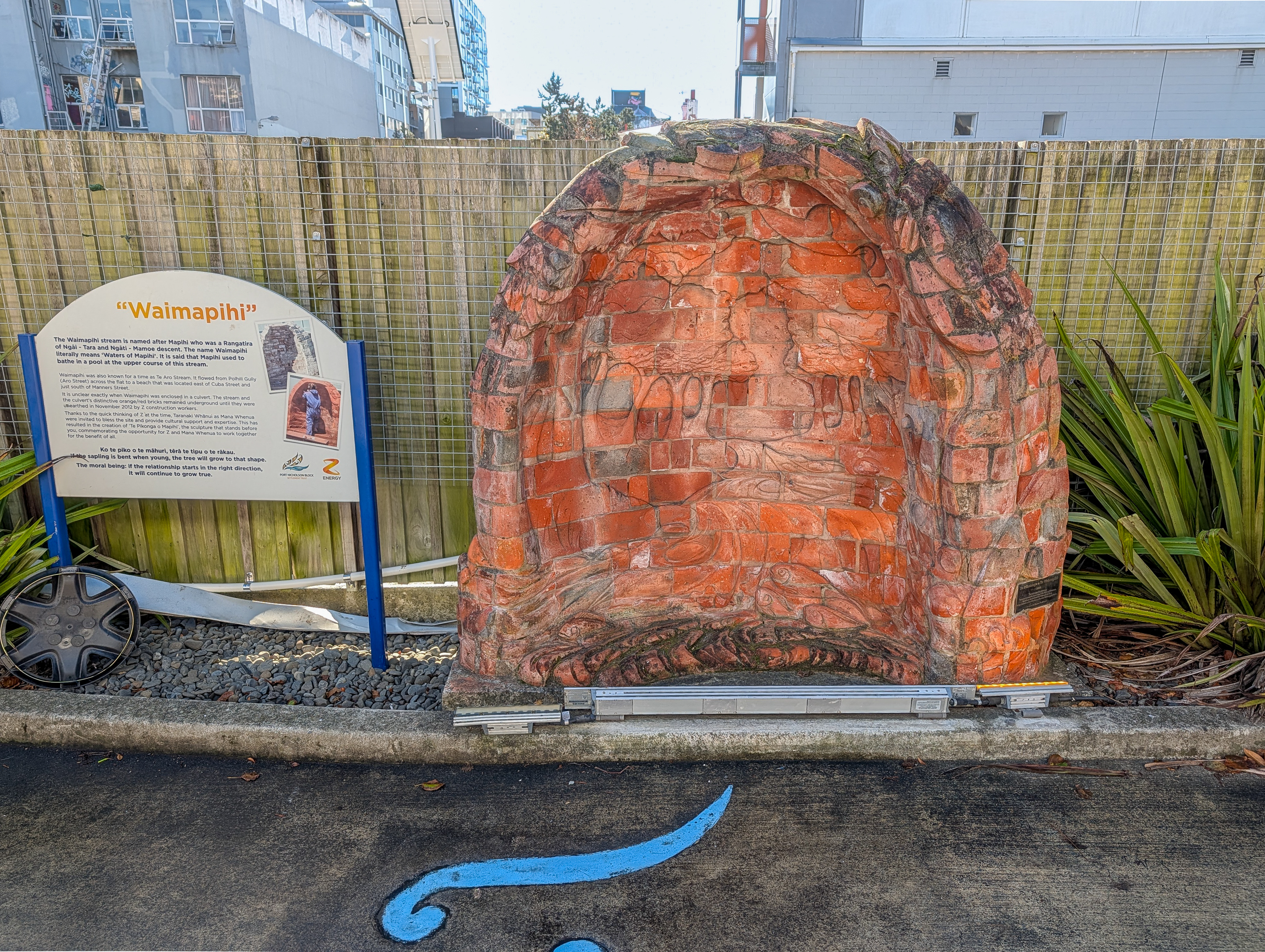
Te Pikonga o Mapihi (2012)

Ra Vincent (born c. 1976) is a New Zealand production designer, set decorator and artist. He is best known for his work on The Hobbit trilogy (2012–2014) and Jojo Rabbit (2019). His accolades include a Hollywood Film Award and a Saturn Award, in addition to nominations for a BAFTA Award, two Academy Awards and two Critics' Choice Movie Awards.

== Biography ==
Vincent is Māori of the iwi Te Atiawa and in addition to his screen work he has produced a number of public sculptures. He started training as an artist in 1997 at the Nelson Marlborough Institute of Technology. His father Bohdi Vincent is also an artist and sculptor and introduced his son to sculpting when he was growing up.

== Public art works ==
- Pou Whenua (2004) at Wai-titi Landing next to the New Zealand government buildings in Thorndon
- Waka Pou (2007) at Waitangi Park commissioned by Wellington Waterfront Ltd and presented by the Tenths Trust
- Anchor Stone (2004), Te Ngākau Civic Square, Wellington
- Kaitiaki – Paraparaumu Library
- Te Pikonga o Mapihi (2012), commemorating the Waimāpihi Stream at Z Energy on Vivian Street, Wellington

== Partial filmography ==
=== As production designer ===
- What We Do in the Shadows (2014)
- Thor: Ragnarok (2017)
- Jojo Rabbit (2019)
- Our Flag Means Death (TV series, 2022)
- Next Goal Wins (2023)
- Predator: Badlands (2025)

=== As set decorator ===
- The Hobbit: An Unexpected Journey (2012)
- The Hobbit: The Desolation of Smaug (2013)
- The Hobbit: The Battle of the Five Armies (2014)
- Alice Through the Looking Glass (2016)
