= Te Aro =

Suburb of Wellington City, New Zealand

- Suburb
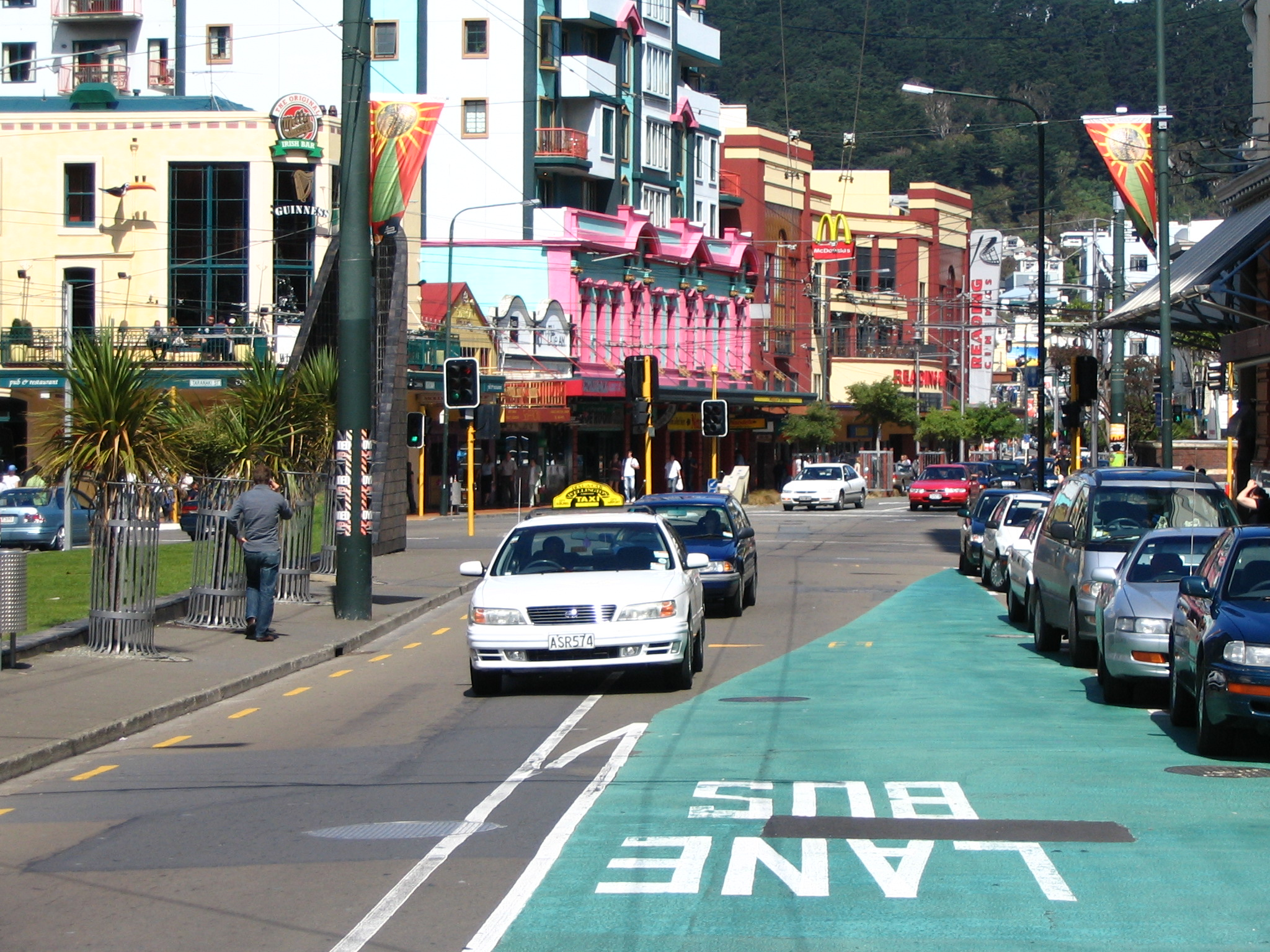
- Dixon Street, looking towards Courtenay Place, in the heart of Te Aro
- Interactive map of Te Aro
- Coordinates: 41.294°S 174.777°E
- Country: New Zealand
- City: Wellington City
- Local authority: Wellington City Council
- Electoral ward: Pukehīnau/Lambton Ward; Te Whanganui-a-Tara Māori Ward

Area
  - Land: 128 ha (320 acres)

Population (June 2025)
  - Total: 11,620
  - Density: 9,080/km^{2} (23,500/sq mi)

Kelburn	Wellington Central
Aro Valley	Te Aro	Oriental Bay
	Mount Cook	Mount Victoria

Te Aro (Māori pronunciation; formerly also known as Te Aro Flat) is an inner-city suburb of Wellington, New Zealand. It comprises the southern part of the central business district including the majority of the city's entertainment district and covers the mostly flat area of city between The Terrace to the west, and Cambridge Terrace at the base of Mount Victoria.

== Geography and history ==
Waimāpihi Stream is now mostly culverted, but formerly ran from the area around Zealandia and down Aro Valley then past what is now the western end of Te Aro Park and on to the sea. The name means "the stream (or bathing place) of Māpihi, a chieftainess of those iwi". Te Aro Pā was east of the stream near what is now lower Taranaki Street.

Waitangi stream flowed from Newtown, past the Basin Reserve and down to the shore at the eastern side of Te Aro, forming a large swamp or lagoon that was used by Māori for food (eels and shellfish) and flax gathering. The stream flooded in heavy rain. Periodically the shingle beach that created the lagoon would collapse, draining the lagoon. This happened in spectacular fashion in March 1853:

On Thursday evening it commenced raining heavily and continued to do so without intermission during the whole of Thursday night and the greater part of yesterday. About four o'clock yesterday afternoon the large additional body of water which had accumulated in the swamp at Te Aro, in consequence of the rain, caused to burst the narrow bank which separated it from the sea with a loud noise which was heard to a considerable distance, and a thick turbid stream of mud poured forth with great rapidity into the harbour. From the head of the swamp, winding through its whole length, a regular channel has been cut of the average width of ten or twelve yards, and during the afternoon masses of earth, and small islands of flax were hurried with amazing swiftness by the stream and force of the current into the harbour, the surface of which was covered to a considerable extent with masses of floating mud and flax. The opening which has been made to the sea by this sudden eruption of the swamp extends over several of the town acres with water frontage at the head of Lambton harbour.

The 1855 Wairarapa earthquake uplifted Te Aro and drained the swamp. The area around the former swampy foreshore was redeveloped and opened in 2006 as Waitangi Park.

The Te Aro Reclamation Act of 1879 made possible reclamation of 40 acres of land on the foreshore as far as what is now Cable Street. Early European settlement in Te Aro was centred on commerce and working-class people, as opposed to Thorndon which was the centre of official business. By the 1880s Te Aro was packed with working-class houses and businesses catering to the workers, and the area had gained a reputation for being poorly-drained, dirty and disease-ridden. Typhoid was prevalent in the city in the early 1890s and most deaths from the disease occurred in the slums of Te Aro. Almost half of Wellington's deaths in the 1918 influenza pandemic occurred in Te Aro. The situation gradually improved as new suburbs such as Newtown, Miramar and Karori opened up and city infrastructure was developed. In 1945 Wellington City Council held a conference to discuss the slums of Te Aro, which led to the widening of Taranaki Street.

=== Te Aro Pā ===
A war party of Te Āti Awa and others migrated from Taranaki to Wellington and established the pā in the 1820s. Members of the New Zealand Company arrived in Wellington in 1839 and laid out a town plan which paid no regard to the several pā in the area. In 1844 six rangatira (chiefs) from the settlement signed the 1844 deed, bringing Te Aro Pā into the New Zealand Company purchase of 1839. William Anson McCleverty was tasked with swapping Māori land around Wellington Harbour for land further away, which resulted in less-convenient food-growing areas.

Around 200 people lived at the pā in the 1840s, but numbers decreased after that. An 1850 survey stated that there were 186 people at Te Aro Pā who were mostly Christian. People lived in traditional "huts" (whare) and there were two "churches or chapels". The people had 26 acres cultivated in potatoes and also grew small amounts of kūmara, wheat and maize. They had seven canoes, 20 horses and two carts, some cattle and tame pigs and had half a ton of flax prepared for export. As a result of losing resources provided by the land they had sold, combined with loss of food- and flax-producing swamp land uplifted by the 1855 earthquake and the return of many people to Taranaki in 1860, the population of Te Aro Pā decreased and by the 1880s almost all had left. Some Māori at the pā had been given Crown Grants to the land which meant they could not sell it, so they leased parcels of land to European settlers. By the 1870s most of the pā's remaining land was sold to Wellington Council who wished to extend Taranaki Street to the waterfront through pā lands.

In 2005 archaeologists discovered the remains of three structures from the pā during redevelopment of a site at 39–43 Taranaki Street.

=== Chinatown ===
Haining Street and Frederick Street are short streets which run between Taranaki Street and Tory Street. This area became the centre of Wellington's Chinese community in the late nineteenth century, after miners migrated to the city from goldfields in the South Island. Haining Street became known by its Chinese residents as Ton Yung Gaai ("Chinese people's street"). Haining Street developed a bad reputation for its gambling houses, brothels and opium dens, and the street's notoriety increased in 1905 when white supremacist Lionel Terry shot dead an elderly Chinese man named Joe Kum Yung. Terry was anti-Asian and told authorities he killed Joe to bring public attention to his views. In 2006 a memorial plaque to Joe Kum Yung was installed on the footpath in Haining Street. Some other reminders of the area's time as Wellington's Chinatown are the Chinese Mission Hall at 40 – 46 Frederick Street, designed by Frederick de Jersey Clere and built in 1905, the Wellington Chinese Masonic Society building at 23 Frederick Street, built in 1925, and the Tung Jung Association building at 2 Frederick Street, built in 1926.

=== Red light district ===
The area around Marion Street, Vivian Street and Cuba Street was the heart of Wellington's red light district for much of the 20th century. Carmen Rupe, a transgender woman prominent in Wellington in the 1970s, ran Carmen's International Coffee House at 86 Vivian Street where sexual services were available. Carmen is remembered with themed traffic lights in Cuba Street. In Marion Street is a trompe-l'oeil mural of a prostitute leaning on a wall. It was painted by Michael Benseman and Michael Ting in 1990, and references the area's history of prostitution. A television documentary produced in 1989 explored the red light district, interviewing prostitutes, strippers and business owners. In 2018 Wellington City Council installed a rainbow-coloured pedestrian crossing at Dixon Street where it bisects Cuba Mall, and in October 2022 two memorial benches were unveiled at the corner of Cuba Street and Vivian Street. The benches commemorate Carmen Rupe and Chrissy Witoko, another transgender businesswoman in the area, and resulted from a collaboration between PrideNZ, the Chrissy Witoko Memorial Trust and the Cultural Heritage team at Wellington City Council.

== Demographics ==
The population of Te Aro roughly doubled between 1991 and 1996 and has increased rapidly since then. The rapid growth rate of population in the area become particularly evident at the beginning of the 21st century as apartment buildings were erected (or converted out of former office buildings) all over the suburb. Particularly characteristic are new rooftop apartments on existing buildings. These can be attributed to the relaxation of city by-laws governing commercial building-zones in the early 1990s. In October 2021 Wellington City Council released its draft District Plan which would allow new buildings in Te Aro to reach 42.5 metres or 12 storeys, to cater for projected population growth in the area. Public feedback following release of the draft plan showed many residents were worried about loss of sunlight and privacy.

Te Aro, comprising the statistical areas of Dixon Street West, Dixon Street East, Vivian West, Courtenay and Vivian East, covers 1.28 km^{2} (0.49 sq mi). It had an estimated population of 11,620 as of June 2025, with a population density of 9,078 people per km^{2}.

Historical population
Year	Pop.	±% p.a.
2006	7,386	—
2013	10,224	+4.75%
2018	11,823	+2.95%
2023	12,369	+0.91%

Te Aro had a population of 12,369 in the 2023 New Zealand census, an increase of 546 people (4.6%) since the 2018 census, and an increase of 2,145 people (21.0%) since the 2013 census. There were 5,913 males, 6,168 females, and 291 people of other genders in 6,039 dwellings. 18.0% of people identified as LGBTIQ+. The median age was 28.8 years (compared with 38.1 years nationally). There were 435 people (3.5%) aged under 15 years, 6,228 (50.4%) aged 15 to 29, 4,992 (40.4%) aged 30 to 64, and 714 (5.8%) aged 65 or older.

People could identify as more than one ethnicity. The results were 69.3% European (Pākehā); 10.1% Māori; 4.3% Pasifika; 24.4% Asian; 3.9% Middle Eastern, Latin American and African New Zealanders (MELAA); and 1.7% other, which includes people giving their ethnicity as "New Zealander". English was spoken by 97.9%, Māori by 2.8%, Samoan by 0.8%, and other languages by 27.6%. No language could be spoken by 0.7% (e.g. too young to talk). New Zealand Sign Language was known by 0.5%. The percentage of people born overseas was 41.7, compared with 28.8% nationally.

Religious affiliations were 18.1% Christian, 3.8% Hindu, 2.2% Islam, 0.6% Māori religious beliefs, 2.2% Buddhist, 0.7% New Age, 0.3% Jewish, and 3.0% other religions. People who answered that they had no religion were 64.6%, and 4.9% of people did not answer the census question.

Of those at least 15 years old, 5,991 (50.2%) people had a bachelor's or higher degree, 4,620 (38.7%) had a post-high school certificate or diploma, and 1,329 (11.1%) people exclusively held high school qualifications. The median income was $51,800, compared with $41,500 nationally. 2,322 people (19.5%) earned over $100,000 compared to 12.1% nationally. The employment status of those at least 15 was 7,329 (61.4%) full-time, 1,656 (13.9%) part-time, and 573 (4.8%) unemployed.

Individual statistical areas
Name	Area (km^{2})	Population	Density (per km^{2})	Dwellings	Median age	Median income
Dixon Street West	0.12	1,275	10.625	405	25.4 years	$26,700
Dixon Street East	0.19	3,420	18,000	1,890	27.7 years	$52,500
Vivian West	0.37	3,240	8,757	1,377	26.8 years	$41,100
Courtenay	0.33	1,743	5,282	912	33.5 years	$64,900
Vivian East	0.29	2,694	9,290	1,452	31.5 years	$63,000
New Zealand					38.1 years	$41,500

== Entertainment and arts ==
Te Aro is New Zealand's largest entertainment district and thrives at night when the business district to the north closes down. Much of the nightlife is in the north of the suburb around Courtenay Place, Dixon Street, and lower Cuba Street. Saturdays are the biggest nights when most bars and clubs stay open to at least 3am.

Movies were historically a popular pastime in Te Aro, but in recent years some cinemas have closed. The Paramount in Courtenay Place opened in 1917 and closed in 2017. The 10-screen Reading complex in Courtenay Place closed in November 2016 after suffering damage in the Kaikōura earthquake. It reopened in March 2017 but closed again in January 2019 after further assessment. The iconic Embassy Theatre, symbolic home of The Lord of the Rings film series, is still open.

Te Aro is home to several small theatres, including Circa, BATS, The Hannah Playhouse and Griffin. Larger venues include The Opera House on Manners Street and the St. James Theatre on Courtenay Place.

There are several galleries and museums in the area. The National Tattoo Museum Of New Zealand opened at 187 Vivian Street in 2011, after moving from other premises.

== Points of interest ==
=== Te Aro Park ===
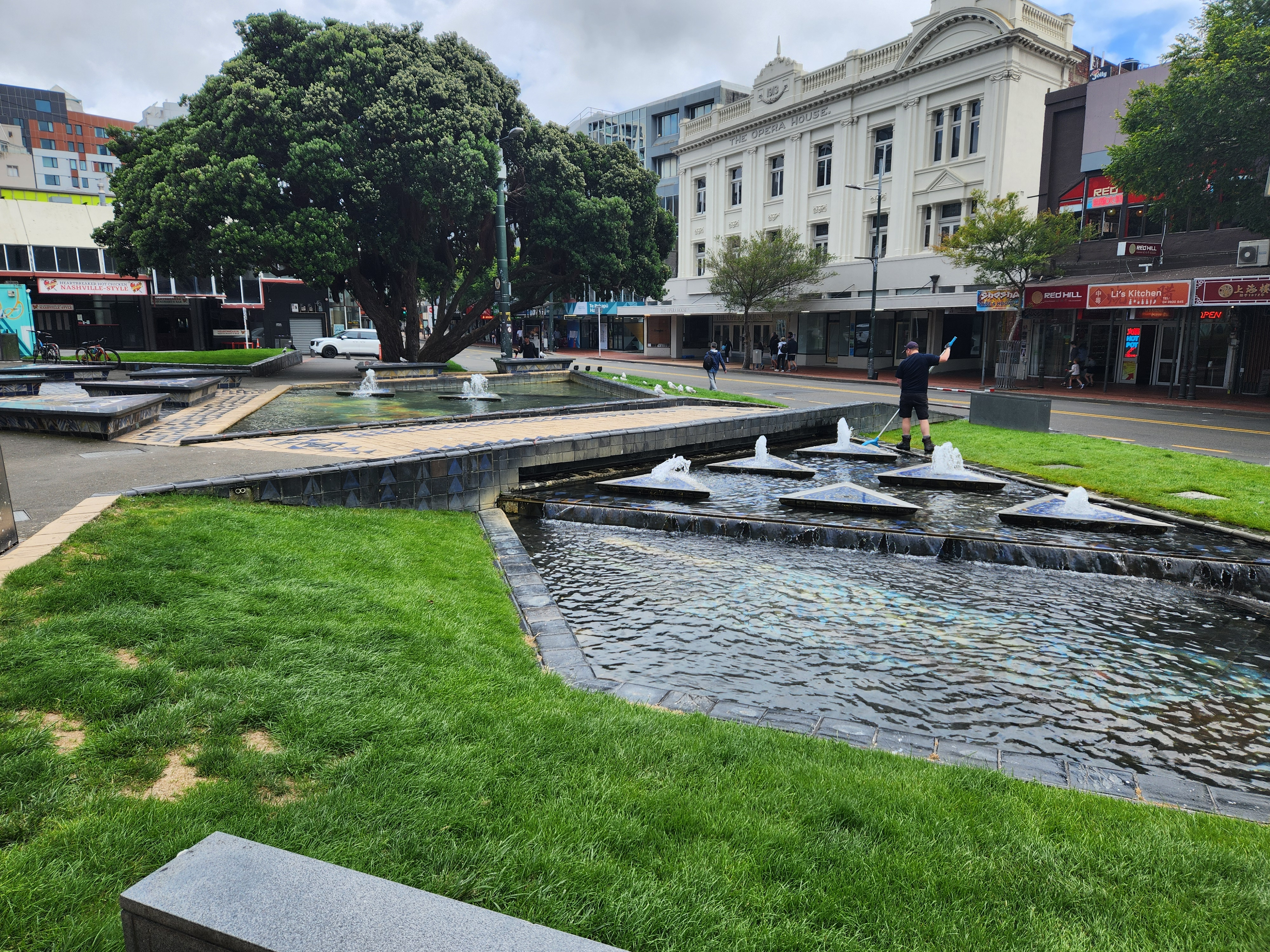
Te Aro Park in 2026

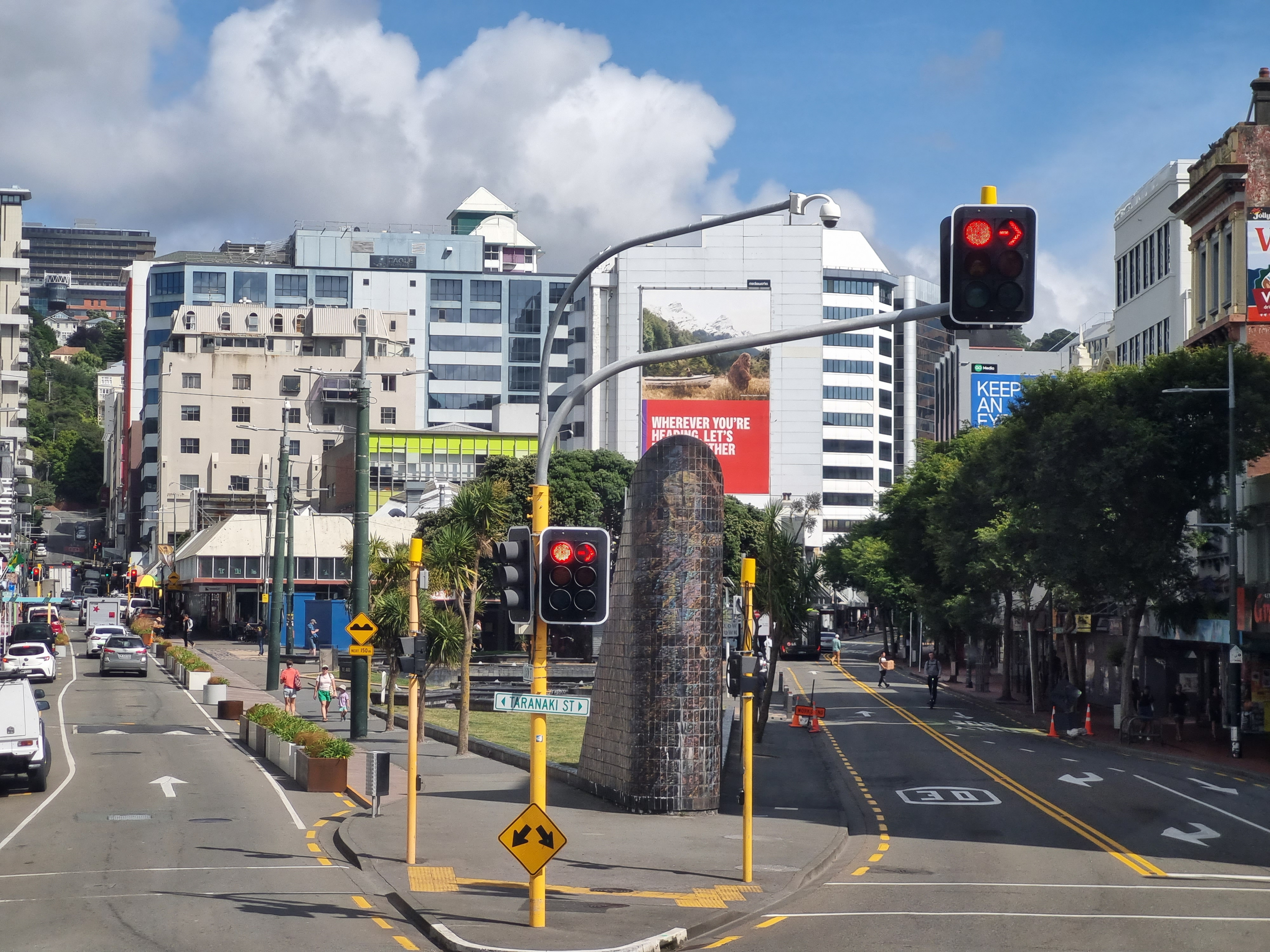
The prow at Te Aro Park, between Dixon Street (left) and Manners Street (right)

Te Aro Park (formerly commonly known as Pigeon Park) is a small public park situated on a triangular piece of land between Manners Street and Dixon Street. Te Aro Pā was close to this location but by the 1880s very few Māori remained at the site. The Council bought the land in the 1870s, and it became known as Market Reserve and then Manners Street Reserve. In 1910 buildings on the site were demolished and a park created, with public toilets at the western end. An electrically operated clock was installed at the eastern end of the park in 1927 by the Tramways Department, but has since been moved further along to a pedestrian area in Courtenay Place. In 1939 a memorial and drinking fountain were installed by Taranaki Street Wesleyan Church to commemorate the centenary of Wesleyan missionaries landing in Wellington and preaching to Māori at Te Aro Pā. The memorial was retained in the redeveloped park.

In 1988 Wellington City Council approved a design by Shona Rapira Davies for redevelopment of the park as a symbolic waka (canoe). The project, named Te Waimapihi, ended up costing over $800,000, more than three times the amount agreed with Davies, and was finished a year later than agreed. A documentary was made about Davies' work on the park and the controversy that surrounded the project. The redeveloped park was opened in May 1992. A tiled upright structure forms the prow of the canoe, and trees planted at intervals along the sides represent paddlers. Paving at the park is formed from 30,000 clay tiles handmade by Davies and imprinted with plants and names. Warning signs had to be installed when it was discovered that the tiles become extremely slippery when wet. Triangular shapes throughout the park evoke Māori weaving, and flowing water in the park's pools represents cleansing and renewal. A piece of pounamu (greenstone) was buried under the prow at the opening ceremony.

From around 2018 anti-social behaviour at the park increased, and in August 2020 a police report on the area was submitted to Wellington City Council for review. The report identified problems including gang members and vulnerable people in nearby emergency housing, easy availability of alcohol from numerous outlets near the park and problems in and around the public toilets at the park. The police report led to publication by the Council of Te Aro Park – Assessing Harm in September 2020. Proposed changes to the park included increased camera surveillance and better sightlines, better lighting, increased patrols by police and Māori wardens and possible removal of the toilet block. The report also identified a need to increase awareness of and mana of the artwork formed by the park's design and tiles. In early 2021 the City Council, in partnership with police and other organisations, launched 'The Pōneke Promise', an initiative to make people feel safer in the inner city. As part of this initiative, in 2022 the City Council removed car parks along one side of Te Aro Park and replaced them with a $600,000 timber boardwalk and planter boxes. The stated aim was to increase visibility around the park, make it look nicer, slow traffic and create more pedestrian space. The changes to the park did not address the issue of problems with people loitering in the park. The Council demolished the public toilets in the park in November 2022, saying this would lead to increased vibrancy in the area. The Council announced that permanent replacement facilities would not be built for over a year, probably in 2024, but that it intended to place some temporary toilets in a nearby street within a few months.

=== Oaks complex ===
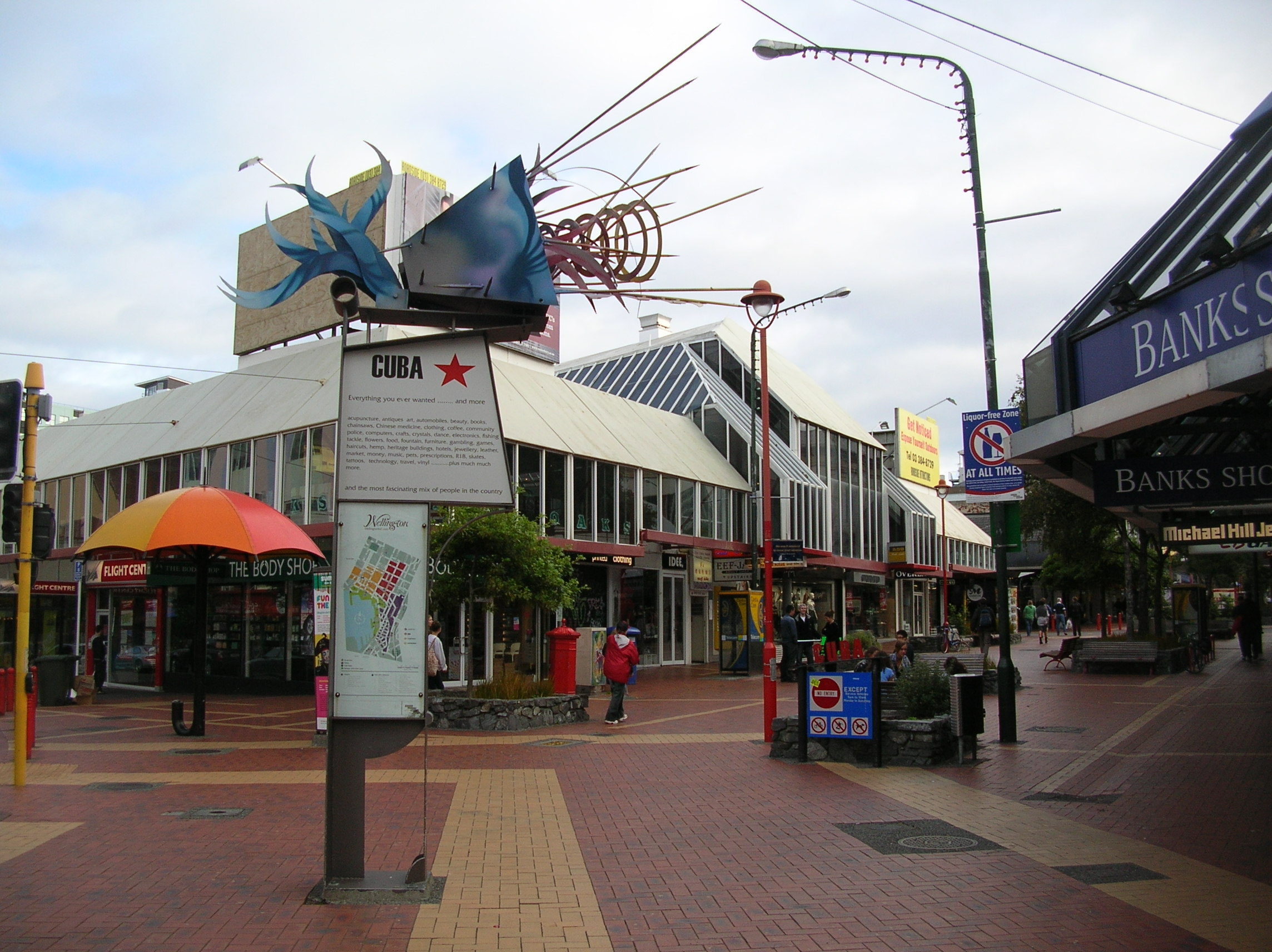
View of the Oaks complex from the intersection of Cuba Mall and Manners Street.

The wide end of the wedge formed by Cuba, Dixon and Manners Streets and adjacent to Te Aro Park was formerly occupied by the Royal Oak Hotel, but this was demolished in 1979 and replaced by the Oaks complex, which was completed in 1981. The building is made of painted steel, glass and tiles and originally had an airy, plant-filled central atrium. Architects Warren and Mahoney won the overall prize in the Steel Awards of 1982 for their attempt "to recreate a contemporary meeting place using the light indoor/outdoor structure". The building was considered a temporary structure. Tenants in the building have included retail shops, cafes, bars and restaurants, and in 2004, an illegal casino.

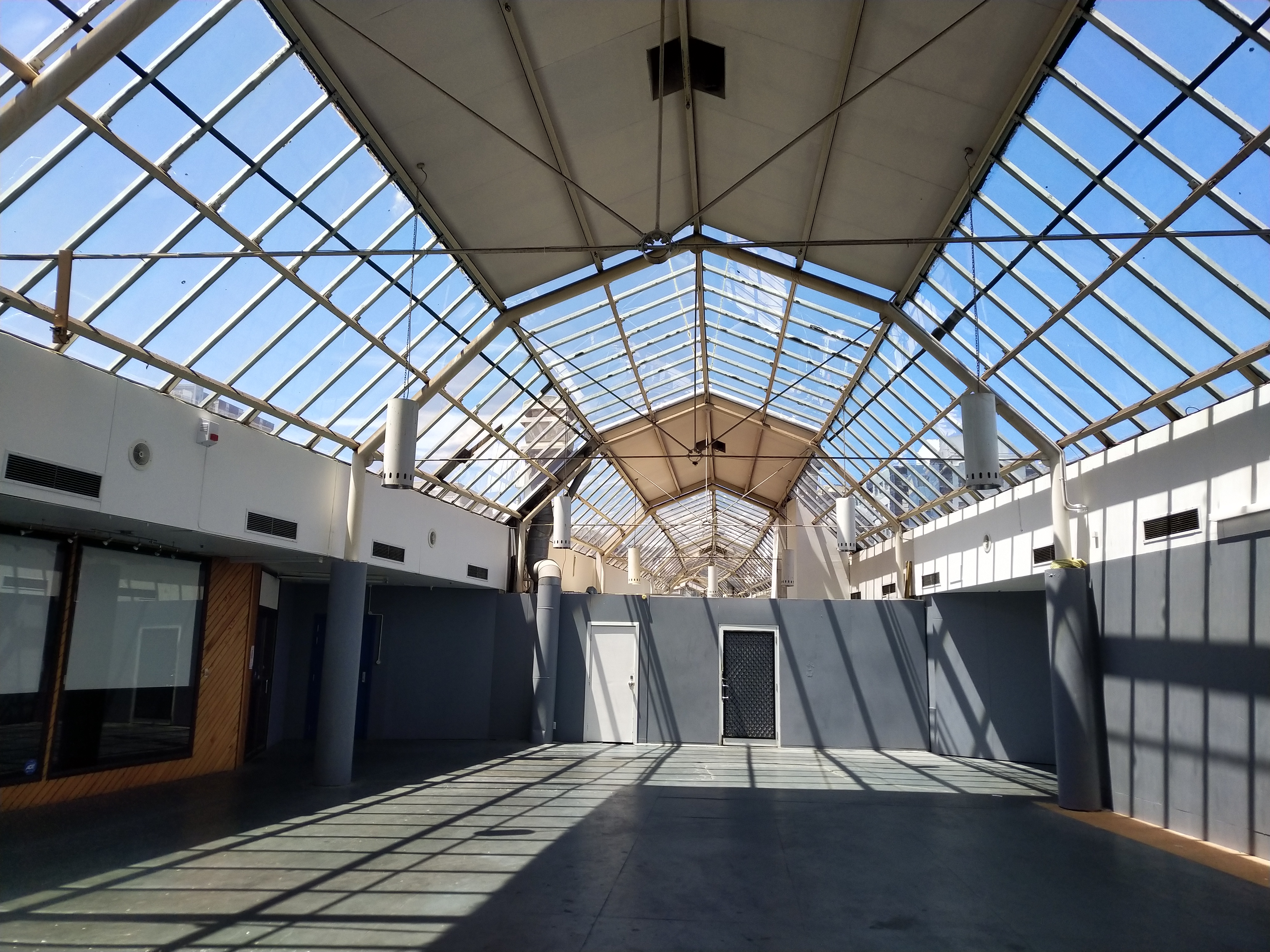
The deserted upper level of the Oaks complex showing where the atrium has been filled in.

In 1996 the central atrium area was filled in. A pedestrian overbridge originally joined the complex to James Smiths department store, but it was removed in the late 1990s. In 2011 Wellington City Council published the Wellington 2040 City Strategy, which among other things suggested that the Oaks could be demolished to make way for a grassed area that would link Te Aro Park to Cuba Mall. The Council's manager for research, strategy, and urban design later clarified that there were no immediate plans to demolish the complex, stating "the land is held by the owner under a lease in perpetuity from the council". In 2015, the Council's Transport and Urban Development Committee chairman Andy Foster suggested that the Oaks could be turned into a covered market. In 2019 the Council released Planning for Growth, a strategic plan for higher density living in the city. Councillor Nicola Young suggested that the Oaks complex was an eyesore that could be demolished to make way for a better building. The Oaks building is owned by Zadimas Properties. Zadimas leases the land under the complex on a 21-year perpetual lease. The rent is updated only every 21 years when the lease comes up for renewal.

=== Cuba Street and Cuba Mall ===
Cuba Street runs north to south through Te Aro, stretching from the Michael Fowler Centre near the harbour to Webb Street, between the Basin Reserve, Mt Cook and Brooklyn areas. Cuba Street is known for its bohemian atmosphere and old architecture. Part of Cuba Street is pedestrianised as Cuba Mall, home of the Bucket Fountain.

=== Courtenay Place ===
Courtenay Place is one of the main streets in Te Aro. It runs east to west from Kent and Cambridge Terraces near the base of Mount Victoria to the intersection of Manners, Dixon and Taranaki Streets at Te Aro Park. Courtenay Place is known as an entertainment and nightlife district and has many theatres, bars and restaurants. Formerly it was also the site of large wholesale fruit and vegetable markets. The warehouses holding the markets have been converted into apartments, offices and entertainment venues.

=== Historic churches ===
St Mary of the Angels (opened 1922) is a Catholic church in Boulcott Street, built in concrete and brick in a Gothic style.

St John's at 176 Willis Street s a Presbyterian church. It is built of wood in a Gothic style, and opened in 1885.

Further along at 211 Willis Street is St Peter's, another wooden church built in a Gothic style. St Peter's was opened in 1879 for the Anglican community. The first church on the site was opened in 1848.

Wesley Methodist Church at 75 Taranaki Street was opened in 1880. It is built of wood and combines Gothic elements with Classical and Romanesque features. Wesley Church is currently used by Pacific Island congregations.

St John's, St Peter's and Wesley Church were all designed by architect Thomas Turnbull.

The Congregational Church on the corner of Cambridge Terrace and Lorne Street (formerly known as 'Ritson's Corner') was designed by William Fielding and opened in 1917. The church is made of brick in a "truncated form of Edwardian Gothic, known in Australia as Federation Gothic". At the rear of the church is an annex used for Sunday School.

=== 'Taj Mahal' ===
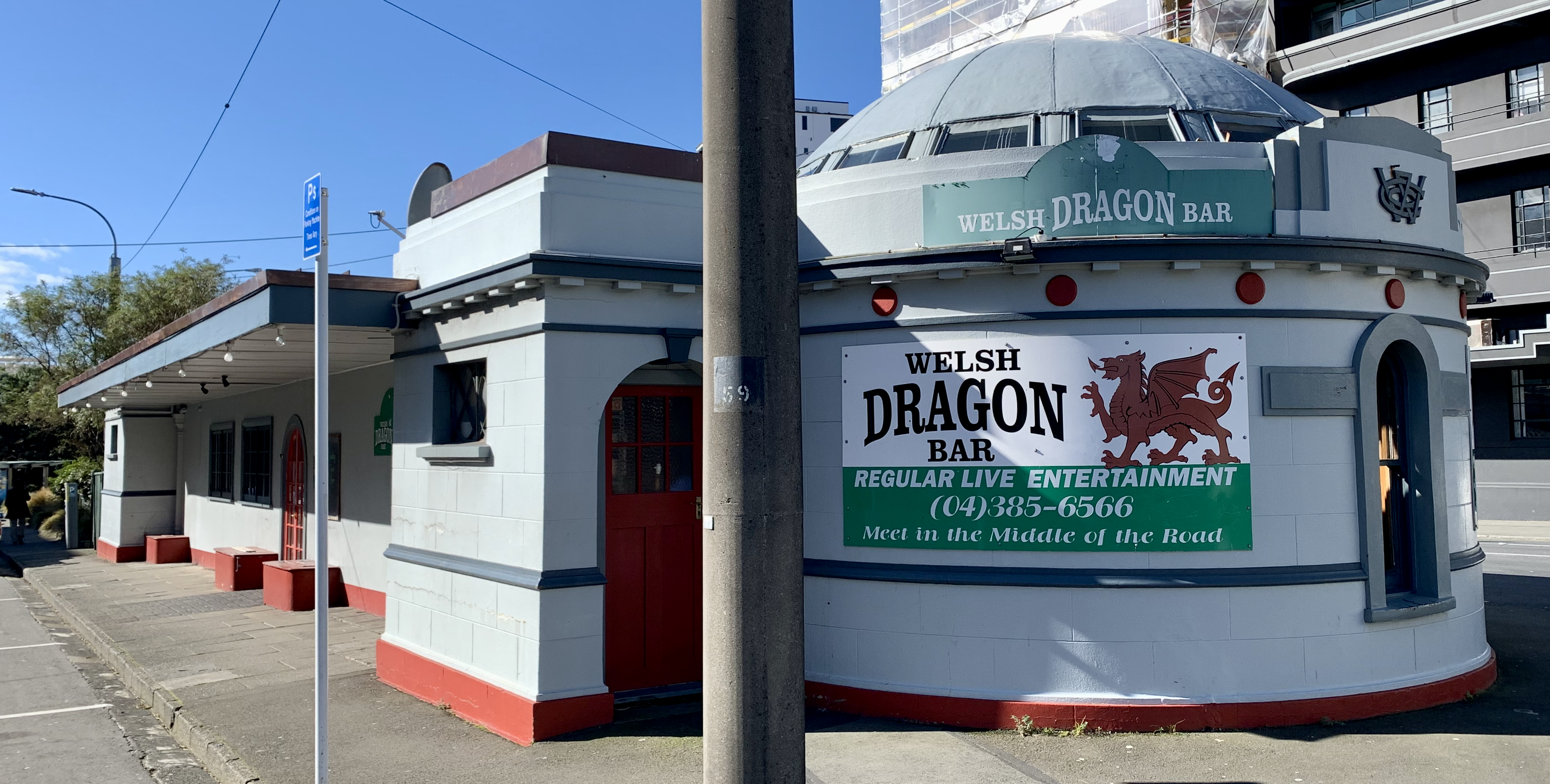
Former public toilets, nicknamed the 'Taj Mahal'.

'Taj Mahal' is the nickname of a building on the median strip between Kent and Cambridge Terraces and Courtenay Place and Wakefield Street. The building was constructed in 1928 and opened in July 1929 as public toilets for tram passengers. With a dome at each end, the building quickly became known as the Taj Mahal. In 1966 the toilets were finally closed due to difficulty of access and lack of use. The building was saved from demolition by public protest, and since then has been used successively as storage for Downstage Theatre, an art gallery, and as home to various bars and restaurants. The Taj was formerly part of the beat for gay men looking for anonymous sex, and students have held capping stunts there. Stephen Oliver wrote a poem called 'The ballad of the Taj Mahal' about the building's varying uses. Since 2004 it has been home to The Welsh Dragon Bar, the first Welsh pub in the Southern Hemisphere.

=== Waterfront ===
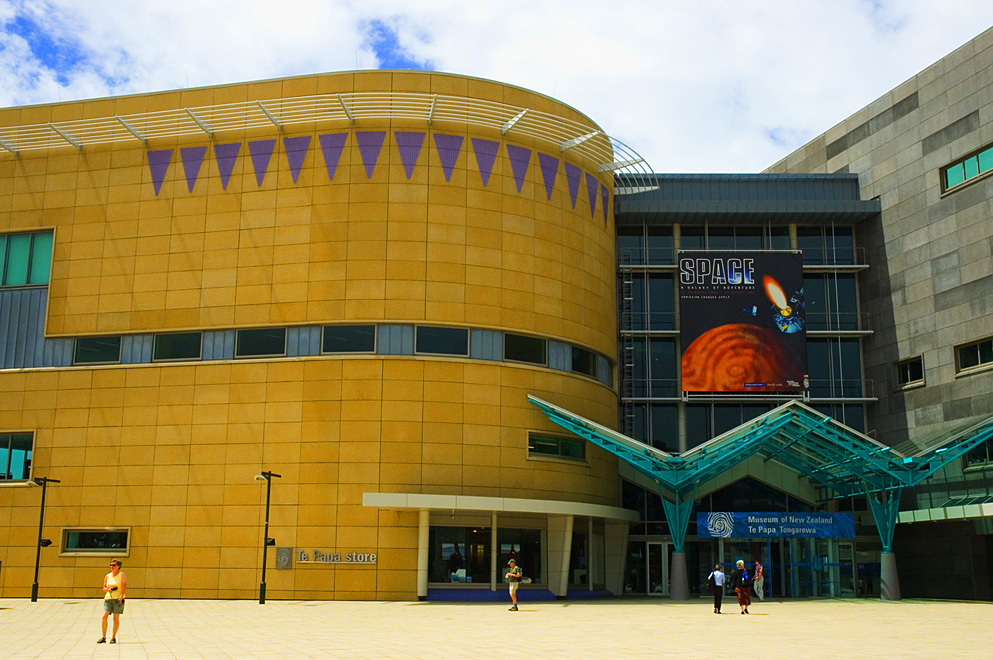
Te Papa, The Museum of New Zealand

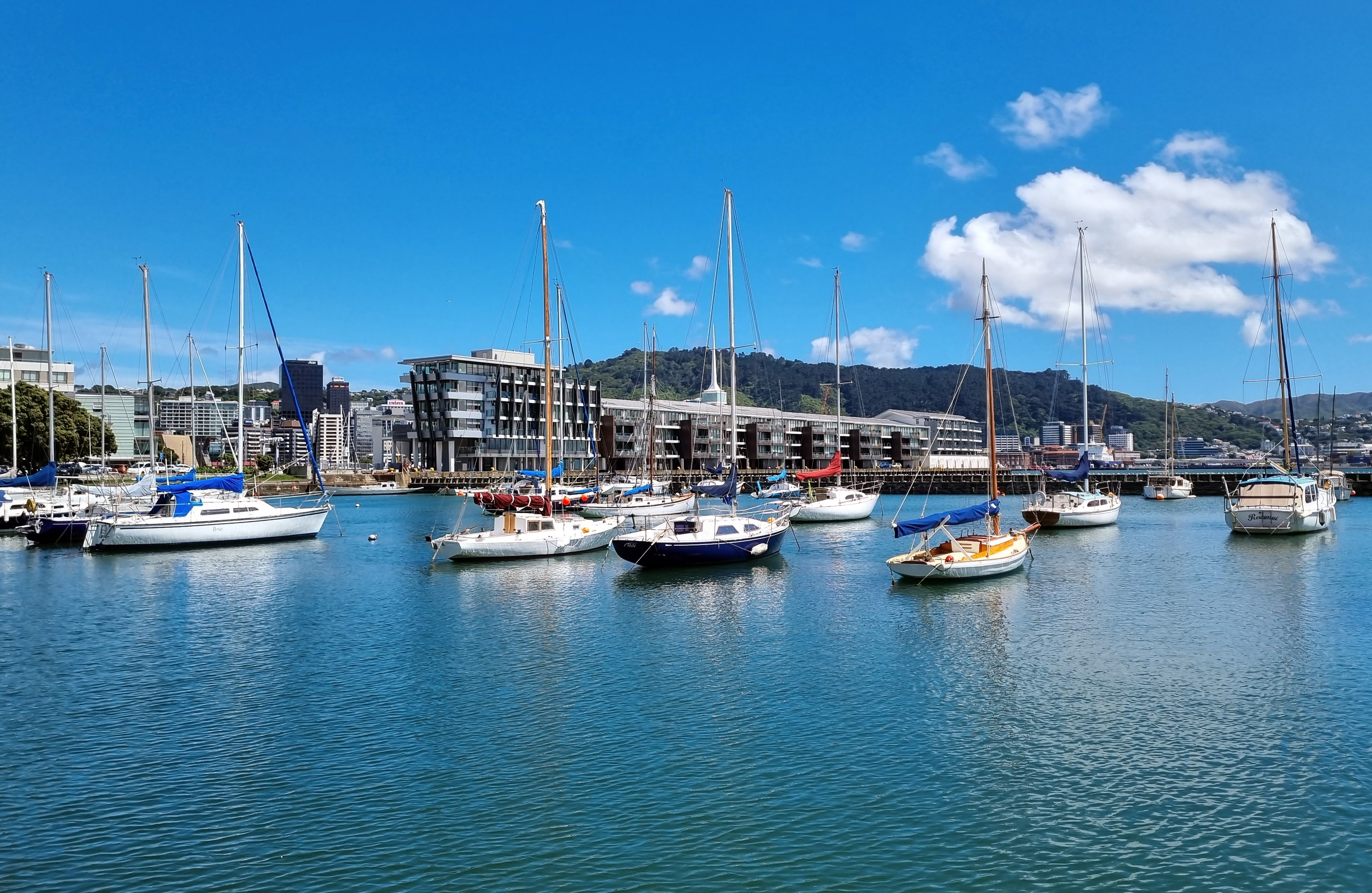
Clyde Quay Wharf apartments seen from Clyde Quay marina

Te Aro is a coastal suburb, and has a popular publicly accessible waterfront area that includes the Museum of New Zealand and Clyde Quay Wharf. Clyde Quay Wharf was completed in 1910 by the Wellington Harbour Board but was never used as much as other wharves in the harbour. In 1961 the wharf was closed. The Overseas Passenger Terminal was built on the wharf by the Wellington Harbour Board, opening in 1964 to cater for an expected increase in passenger shipping which never eventuated. The building was also used as a function venue. The Overseas Passenger Terminal was demolished in 2012 to make way for a new apartment complex called Clyde Quay Wharf, which opened in 2014. It has 75 apartments, but the area at ground level around the wharf has been left accessible to the public. The spire and four wall mosaics from the old building were used in the new one.

A new outdoor recreation area, Waitangi Park, opened in 2006. The Wellington waterfront west of Taranaki Street, including Frank Kitts Park and Civic Square, is part of Wellington Central, not Te Aro.

The popular beach at Oriental Bay is five minutes' walk from the north-eastern edge of Te Aro.

== Politics ==
Te Aro is part of the Wellington Central general electorate and Te Tai Tonga Māori electorate. As the heart of the capital city, Te Aro is a highly politicised suburb. A number of issues in Te Aro have garnered national attention. The long-proposed and much-protested Wellington Inner City Bypass through Te Aro was a news story for decades, but is now accepted.

Former Wellington Mayor Kerry Prendergast was accused of nepotism for allowing high-rise development by her husband to go ahead in the predominantly low-rise area of southern Te Aro.

A statue of Queen Victoria sits on a traffic island between Kent and Cambridge Terraces at the western side of Te Aro. The statue has occasionally featured in protest movements: for example, in 2007 Queen Victoria held a tino rangatiratanga flag, and in 2020 the statue was blindfolded in a protest against colonialism and racism.

== Transport ==
Te Aro is served by buses, which have taken the place of trams. The Wellington tramway system served Te Aro from 1878 to 1964, with a number of routes to other Wellington suburbs. For over two decades, Te Aro was also served by the Te Aro Extension, a railway line from the New Zealand Railway's former Lambton station (not to be confused with the current Wellington station on Bunny Street) to Te Aro station. It opened in 1893; at its peak approximately 30 trains daily used the line, but local businesses complained about the dirt and noise of steam locomotives and the trains caused delays to traffic on important city streets. This led to the line's closure in 1917 and subsequent removal.

Some Wellington City Councillors have proposed re-extending rail services back to Courtenay Place and further, either as light rail or underground.

== Education ==
There are three state primary schools bordering the Te Aro area.

Mount Cook School to the south at 160 Tory Street takes children from year 0–8 and has a school zone that encompasses Te Aro. The school had a roll of 297 as of July 2026.

To the west is Te Aro School, located in Kelburn at 360 The Terrace, and to the east is Clyde Quay School, a year 0–8 school in Elizabeth Street in Mount Victoria. Both of these schools have zones which exclude the Te Aro area.

Central Regional Health School is a school in Wakefield Street for students with high health-care needs.

The nearest state secondary schools are Wellington Girls' College (single-sex – girls) in Thorndon, Wellington College (single sex – boys) and Wellington East Girls' College (single sex – girls) at the Basin Reserve, and Wellington High School (co-ed) in Mount Cook. Wellington Girls' College's enrolment zone excludes Te Aro but the other three schools have zones that include Te Aro.

== Neighbouring suburbs ==
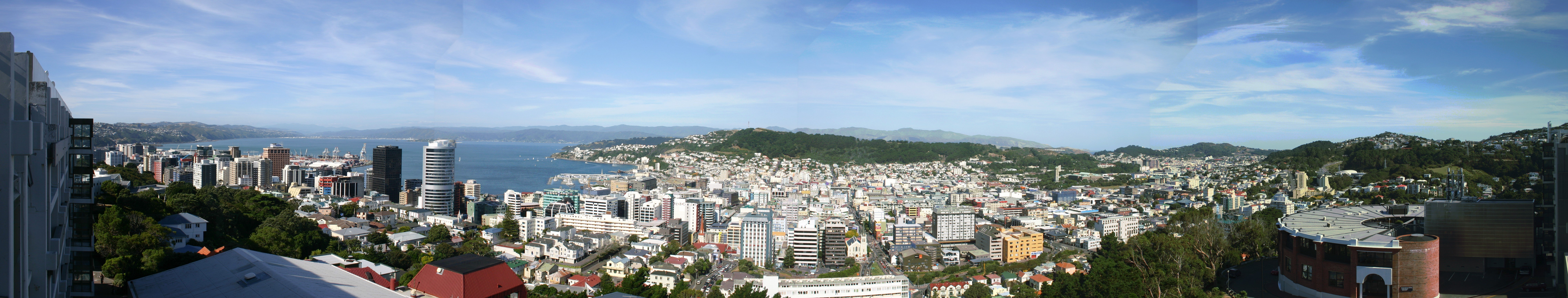
A panorama of Wellington centred on Te Aro, taken from the Kelburn campus of Victoria University. The high-rises on the left are in Wellington Central.

- Wellington Central, the city's high-rise office district, is to the north. The boundary between the two halves of the central business district is at Civic Square where the ridge to the west comes closest to the sea.
- Kelburn is on the hills to the west, accessible via The Terrace and a few streets climbing from it, such as Salamanca Road and Bolton Street, and separated from Te Aro by Victoria University's main (Kelburn) Campus.
- Aro Valley lies beneath Kelburn to the southwest, and the turn into Aro Street marks the transition from Te Aro.
- Mount Cook is the low hill south of Te Aro; it contains the National War Memorial and Carillon, visible from much of southern Te Aro. Te Aro's southern boundary runs along Webb and Buckle Streets.
- Mount Victoria, the suburb on the western slope of the hill of the same name, is divided from Te Aro by the twin roads of Kent Terrace and Cambridge Terrace. The land for these roads was initially planned to be a channel into an inner harbour at the Basin Reserve. The plans were dropped when the 1855 earthquake lifted the land by several metres.
- Oriental Bay is the capital's inner-city beach suburb, accessible from Te Aro via Oriental Parade to the northeast.
