= Aro Valley =

Suburb of Wellington City, New Zealand

- Suburb
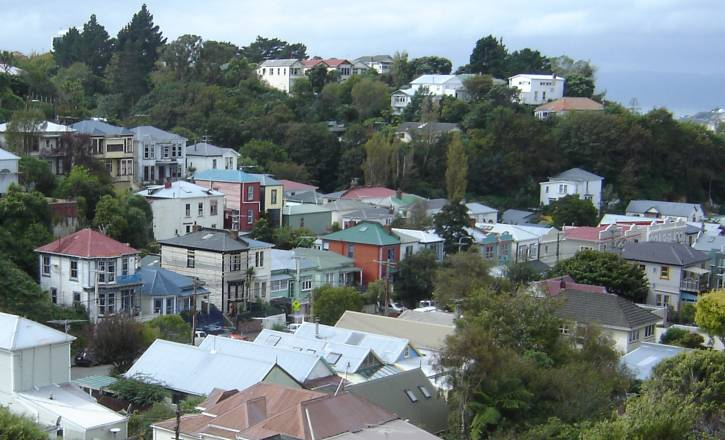
- Houses along Aro St
- Interactive map of Aro Valley
- Coordinates: 41°17′43″S 174°46′3″E
- Country: New Zealand
- City: Wellington
- Local authority: Wellington City Council
- Electoral ward: Pukehīnau/Lambton Ward; Te Whanganui-a-Tara Māori Ward

Area
  - Land: 125 ha (310 acres)

Population (June 2025)
  - Total: 3,710
  - Density: 2,970/km^{2} (7,690/sq mi)

Northland	Kelburn
Mitchelltown, Taitville (also known as Highbury or Mount Pleasant)	Aro Valley	Te Aro city centre
	Brooklyn

The Aro Valley forms a small inner-city suburb of Wellington in New Zealand. It takes its name from the stream which originally flowed where modern Hōniana Te Puni (formerly Epuni) Street is. The stream's Māori name was originally Wai-Māpihi, but it was commonly called Te Aro Stream due to it running through the Te Aro flat.

== Geography ==
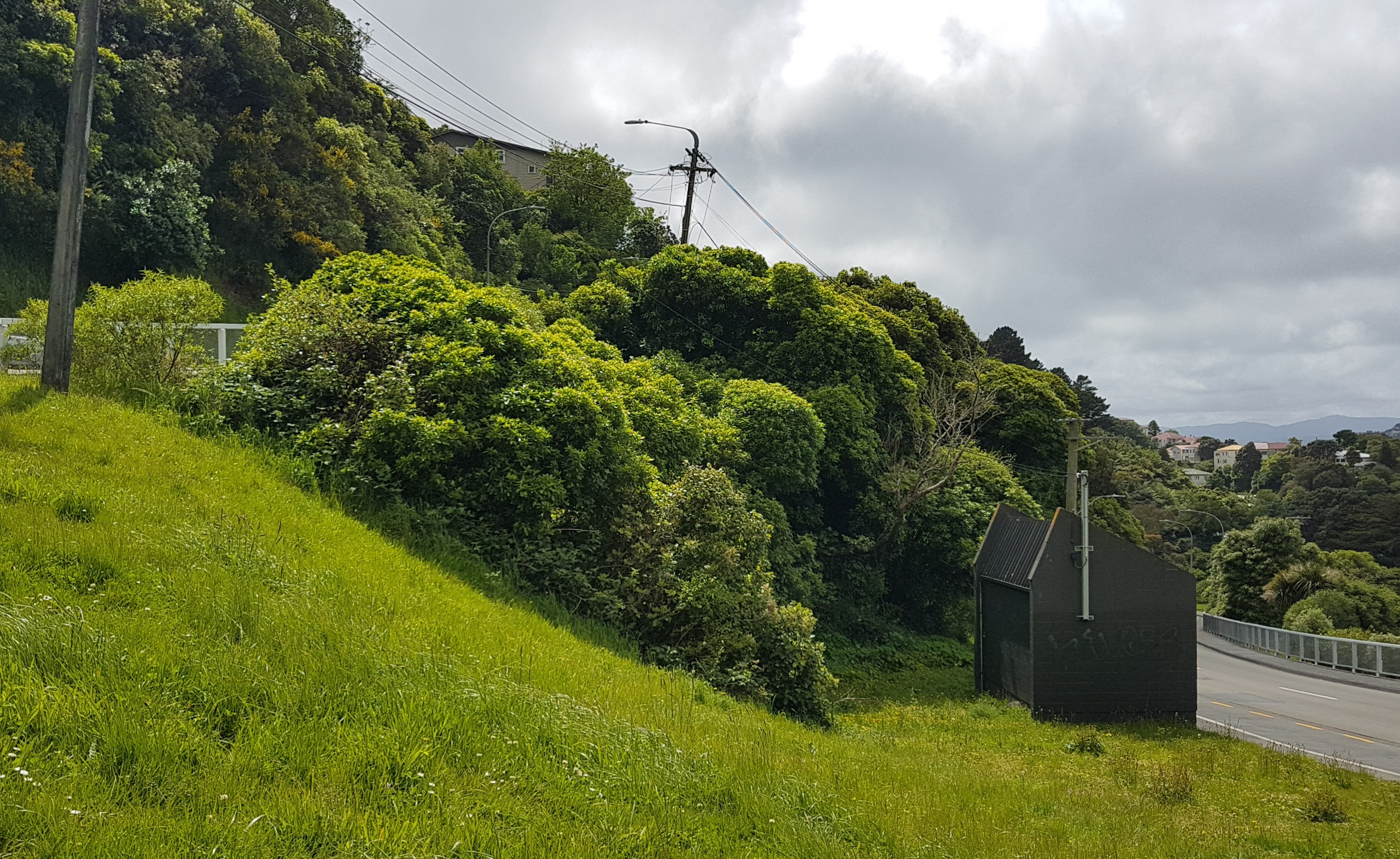
Raroa Road

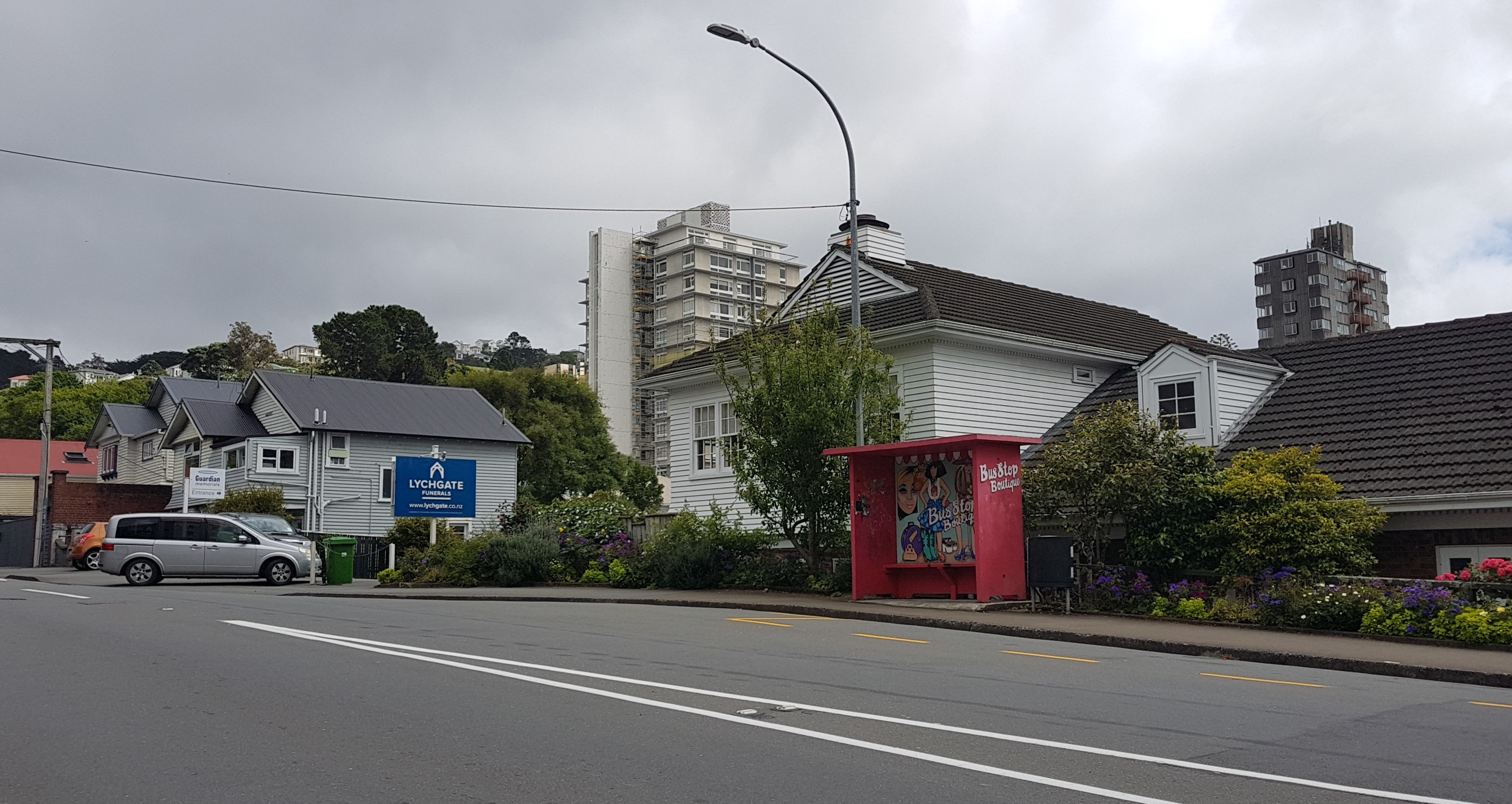
Aro Valley close to the intersection with Willis Street

Aro Valley suburb is 126 hectares running between the hills of Brooklyn to the south, and Kelburn to the north, with the area of Karori to the west and Te Aro, the city centre to the east.

Much of Wellington consists of the remnants of an old peneplain, a flat expanse that rose from the sea about 20 million years ago. This land was heavily dissected by watercourses from that time and today the tops of the hills around Wellington indicate the general height of that eroded peneplain. During this time massive faults appeared that are still active today.

Aro Valley formed from fault activity. One kilometre to the west of Aro Valley is the Wellington Fault running north-east along the foot of the Tinakori Hills and beyond. A series of splinter faults branch off from the Wellington Fault. Activity along these faults over millions of years caused tilting of the land to create valleys, including Aro Valley, south-east of the main fault.

Aro Valley, and its tributary valleys, are well sheltered from the wind and have soil enriched by past alluvial deposits. The valley walls are steep in places and house sites are correspondingly uneven, in typical Wellington fashion.

The valley comprises part of the bed of the Waimāpihi Stream. Aro Street runs through the whole valley, from Willis Street in the east to Raroa Road in the west; major side-streets include Devon Street, Hōniana Te Puni Street, Adams Terrace, Mitchelltown's Holloway Road and Taitville's Norway Street.

== Parks ==
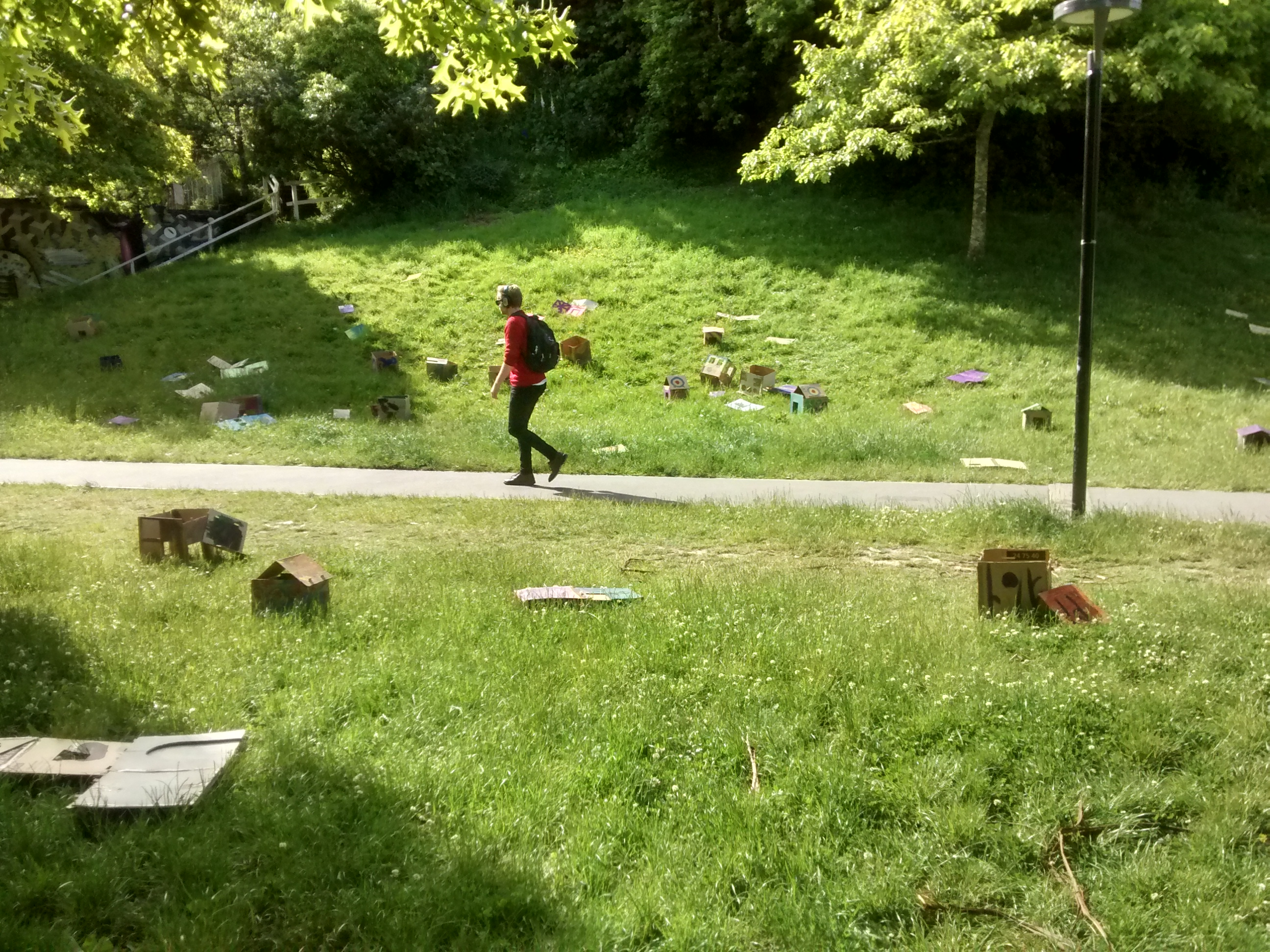
Cardboard houses set up in Aro Valley Park

A prominent feature of Aro Valley is Aro Park, which is the site of the former Matauranga School, which was itself on the site of the original Catholic school – St Mary of the Angels. The park was formerly known as Seed's Hill after an early (1864) land owner, William Seed. The park has been extended and landscaped in recent years and is a focus for community recreation, especially on summer nights and weekends: the Aro Valley Community Centre stands on part of the park.

in 2017 Wellington Council purchased a considerable area of land to the north west border of Aro Park which will form part of the Wellington Town Belt.

Aro Valley is almost surrounded by parkland: the Aro Park to the north, Polhill Gully Recreation Reserve to the north west and Tanera Reserve & Central Park to the south east.

=== Waimapihi Reserve ===
Waimapihi Reserve (formerly Polhill Reserve) – on the western end of Aro Street – was named for the early settler, Baker Polhill. After his arrival in 1841 aboard the Oriental, Polhill started a business selling timber harvested from the gully. Although he did not own the land, it became known as Polhill's Gully. The area was originally a cultivation for Te Aro Māori.

By the 1960s Victoria University was considering Polhill Gully and Holloway Road as potential sites for its own expansion and began buying houses but by the 1970s the plans were being actively challenged by a new generation of Mitchelltown residents who felt the houses and the neighbourhood were worth saving, and by others who envisaged the restoration of Polhill Gully for wildlife habitat and recreational use. Discussion, disagreement and protest went on for years, and the university finally abandoned its plans in the early 1980s. Polhill Gully became a City Council Recreation Reserve in 1989.

In 2021, Wellington City Council changed the name from Polhill Gully to Waimapihi Reserve.

Today the reserve is an attractive amenity used by more than a thousand cyclists, runners and walkers a week. It is also frequented by birds, including—thanks to the proximity of the Zealandia wildlife sanctuary—many tūī and kākā, and the occasional bellbird, grey warbler, North Island robin and saddleback.

== History ==
The Aro Valley today is a largely untouched remnant of old Wellington, with the majority of its dwellings dating from the first two decades of the twentieth century, and a significant number from the nineteenth. Wellington City Council notes: "The Valley projects a strong sense of place due to its geographical separation from other parts of the city, the enclosure of the valley walls and the relative consistency of development within."

=== Nineteenth century ===
Early tribal occupants of the Aro Valley included Ngāti Mutunga, Ngāti Ruanui, Muaūpoko and Ngāti Mamoe. In the 1830s Taranaki iwi Te Āti Awa settled at its western end. The stream itself was an important food source for Māori. It was called Waimapihi – in Māori, "the stream or bathing place" of Mapihi, a local chieftainess of Muaūpoko and Ngāti Mamoe descent. These small communities adapted as best they could to the influx of British settlers that began in 1840, but they took a blow in 1855 when an earthquake raised the low-lying land draining the marshes and cutting off their main source of both food and flax for trading. This misfortune, combined with widespread illness, migration back to Taranaki to settle land disputes, and pressure from settlers for land, gradually saw the Māori population of Te Aro dwindle.

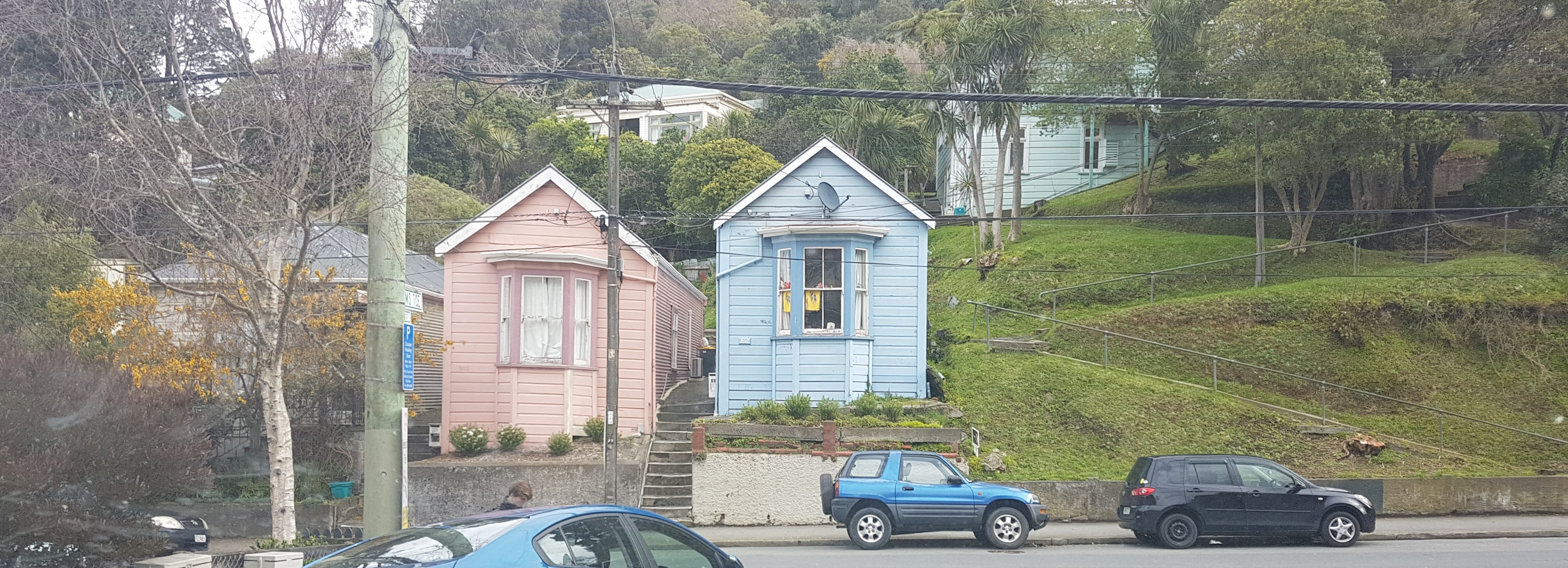
205 & 207 Aro Street. Built by George Baker, circa 1897. Historic Place Category 2

The land was part of the New Zealand Company purchase in 1839. It was first developed by settler Wellingtonians as a working-class residential suburb in around 1860, Aro Valley featured small, narrow sections with closely built wooden or corrugated-iron houses.

In the 1840 Plan of Wellington, Aro Valley consisted of Wordsworth, Aro and Epuni Streets, as well as St John Street, which connected Aro Street and what became known as The Terrace. Of the 13 freehold acres available for European settlers, nine were in Epuni Street. European settlement grew as Māori left the area, including Te Āti Awa who returned to Taranaki in the 1850–60s. The valley increased in prominence with the opening of the Old Bullock Track, which allowed the valley to serve as an additional access route to Karori and which settlers would use when buying or selling goods in Wellington.

Devon Street in the north of Aro Valley was developed by William Adams, who came from the English county of Devon. Adams purchased land here in 1885 and some of the houses built were occupied by his son and daughter-in-law Maxwell and Lila Adams.

=== Twentieth century ===
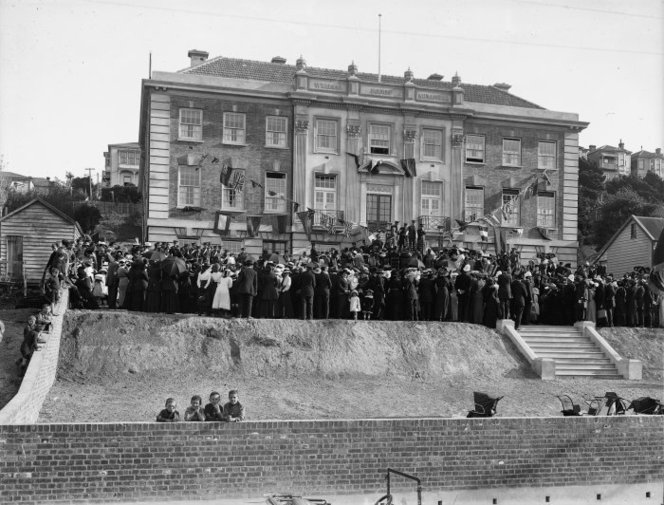
The opening of the William Booth Memorial Training College in 1914 (now Philosophy House).

War memorial in Aro Valley

A route of the Wellington tramway system was opened in 1904, connecting Aro Street to the Wellington railway station via the city centre; it closed in 1957.

In the 1960s, the Evening Post described Holloway Road (a street on the western edge of Aro Valley) as "sagging stairways with most of the tread rotted away", leading to "sagging, open doors and damp, musty rooms where glass from broken windows crunches underfoot".

Matauranga School was a progressive primary school set up by Marie Bell and parents of Aro Valley in 1963 and was a pioneer for the 'free-play' method of pre-schooling within New Zealand. In 1967 it became a full primary school. The school closed in 1982 after teachers Marie Bell and Mike Regan left the school. The site became the current park and community centre in 1983 after residents fought the City Council which had "promise[d] to create community open space in the old asphalt schoolyard known as Matauranga [school]"

Gentrification has been ongoing in Aro Valley from the 1970s, boosted by urban-renewal planning (the Comprehensive Urban Renewal Area or CURA) after the rejection of a proposal to turn the valley into a main arterial road route: it became a desirable suburb, seen as close to the centre of Wellington and boasting notable community spirit. The Aro Valley Community Council was established in 1978 and was followed by the building of the Aro Valley Community Centre.

In 1974, the Aro Street public toilets were the scene of a Russian spy drama, when economist, historian and writer Bill Sutch was caught and charged with attempting to pass classified information to the Soviet Union. Sutch was later acquitted.

Aro Street post office opened in 1901 and closed from 5 February 1988 when Postmaster-General, Richard Prebble, closed or reduced 580 offices. It has been converted to a house at 81 Aro Street.

Aro Valley contains the largest collection of unaltered working-class homes in Wellington, some built by local tradesmen for employees, and many put up by professional builders and developers as speculative investments. Many of the buildings used as shops along Aro Street and a number of houses on Aro Street and Holloway Road are protected by designation on Wellington City Council's Heritage List.

Many of Aro Valley's older houses have serious problems with damp and mould, particularly those on the shadier side of the valley. One study in 2020 found that as many as 40% of Aro Valley houses were damp. Despite this, Aro Valley remains a popular location for students to live due to its proximity to the university.

As of 2021, 59% of homes in Aro Valley were non-owner occupied (rentals) and the median rental price was $631. Between 2017 and 2021 the median sale price for a house in Aro Valley increased from $680,000 to $1.15 million.

== Demographics ==
Aro Valley statistical area, which includes Highbury and Mitchelltown, covers 1.25 km^{2} (0.48 sq mi). It had an estimated population of 3,710 as of June 2025, with a population density of 2,968 people per km^{2}.

Historical population
Year	Pop.	±% p.a.
2006	3,432	—
2013	3,621	+0.77%
2018	3,762	+0.77%
2023	3,582	−0.98%

Aro Valley had a population of 3,582 in the 2023 New Zealand census, a decrease of 180 people (−4.8%) since the 2018 census, and a decrease of 39 people (−1.1%) since the 2013 census. There were 1,686 males, 1,791 females, and 105 people of other genders in 1,452 dwellings. 18.8% of people identified as LGBTIQ+. The median age was 27.7 years (compared with 38.1 years nationally). There were 228 people (6.4%) aged under 15 years, 1,773 (49.5%) aged 15 to 29, 1,275 (35.6%) aged 30 to 64, and 303 (8.5%) aged 65 or older.

People could identify as more than one ethnicity. The results were 84.0% European (Pākehā); 10.8% Māori; 2.8% Pasifika; 11.9% Asian; 3.4% Middle Eastern, Latin American and African New Zealanders (MELAA); and 1.5% other, which includes people giving their ethnicity as "New Zealander". English was spoken by 97.7%, Māori by 2.9%, Samoan by 0.5%, and other languages by 20.1%. No language could be spoken by 0.9% (e.g. too young to talk). New Zealand Sign Language was known by 0.7%. The percentage of people born overseas was 30.9, compared with 28.8% nationally.

Religious affiliations were 14.8% Christian, 1.3% Hindu, 0.6% Islam, 0.4% Māori religious beliefs, 1.1% Buddhist, 1.3% New Age, 0.3% Jewish, and 2.4% other religions. People who answered that they had no religion were 73.4%, and 4.5% of people did not answer the census question.

Of those at least 15 years old, 1,590 (47.4%) people had a bachelor's or higher degree, 1,443 (43.0%) had a post-high school certificate or diploma, and 324 (9.7%) people exclusively held high school qualifications. The median income was $39,500, compared with $41,500 nationally. 567 people (16.9%) earned over $100,000 compared to 12.1% nationally. The employment status of those at least 15 was 1,776 (53.0%) full-time, 720 (21.5%) part-time, and 168 (5.0%) unemployed.

== Sociology ==
Aro Valley also adjoins parts of Victoria University (mainly to the north), and a large number of valley residents study there or at Massey University to the east. Despite the gentrification of the suburb, it keeps its reputation as a home to politico-social radicals. The area has a strong community council campaigning on a variety of issues such as eliminating plastic bag use in local shops.

Alexandra Hollis writes in Salient that "although Aro is this liberal, artsy enclave, it is also very aware of this reputation". Illustrating this artiness, young film-makers based in Wellington in the late 90s and 2000 were dubbed the Aro Valley movement. They made feature-length narrative dramas, which they edited and assembled on computer editing suites.

== Politics ==
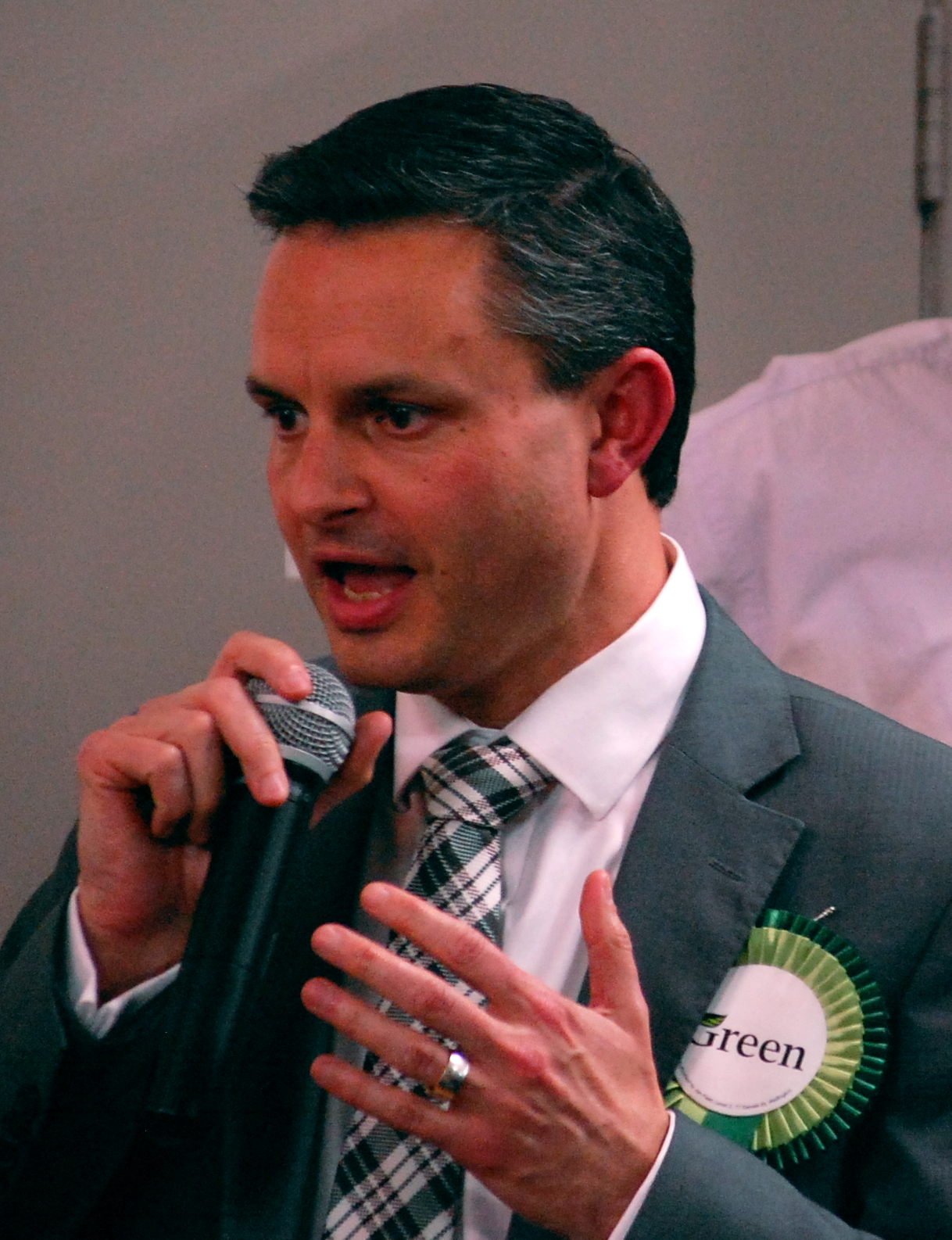
Green MP James Shaw speaking at the 2014 Aro Valley candidates meeting. Shaw also lives in Aro Valley.

Politically, Aro Valley has become a stronghold or "spiritual home" of the Green Party. In the 2011 general election, the Aro Valley Community Centre was the polling station with the most number of ballots for the Green Party in the country (619), and also was amongst the top polling stations in terms of percentage support for the Greens (at 44%).

Before every general election the Aro Valley candidates meeting is held in the Aro Valley community hall. The atmosphere of the meetings can make them intimidating for candidates, who often face heckling from the audience.

== Education ==
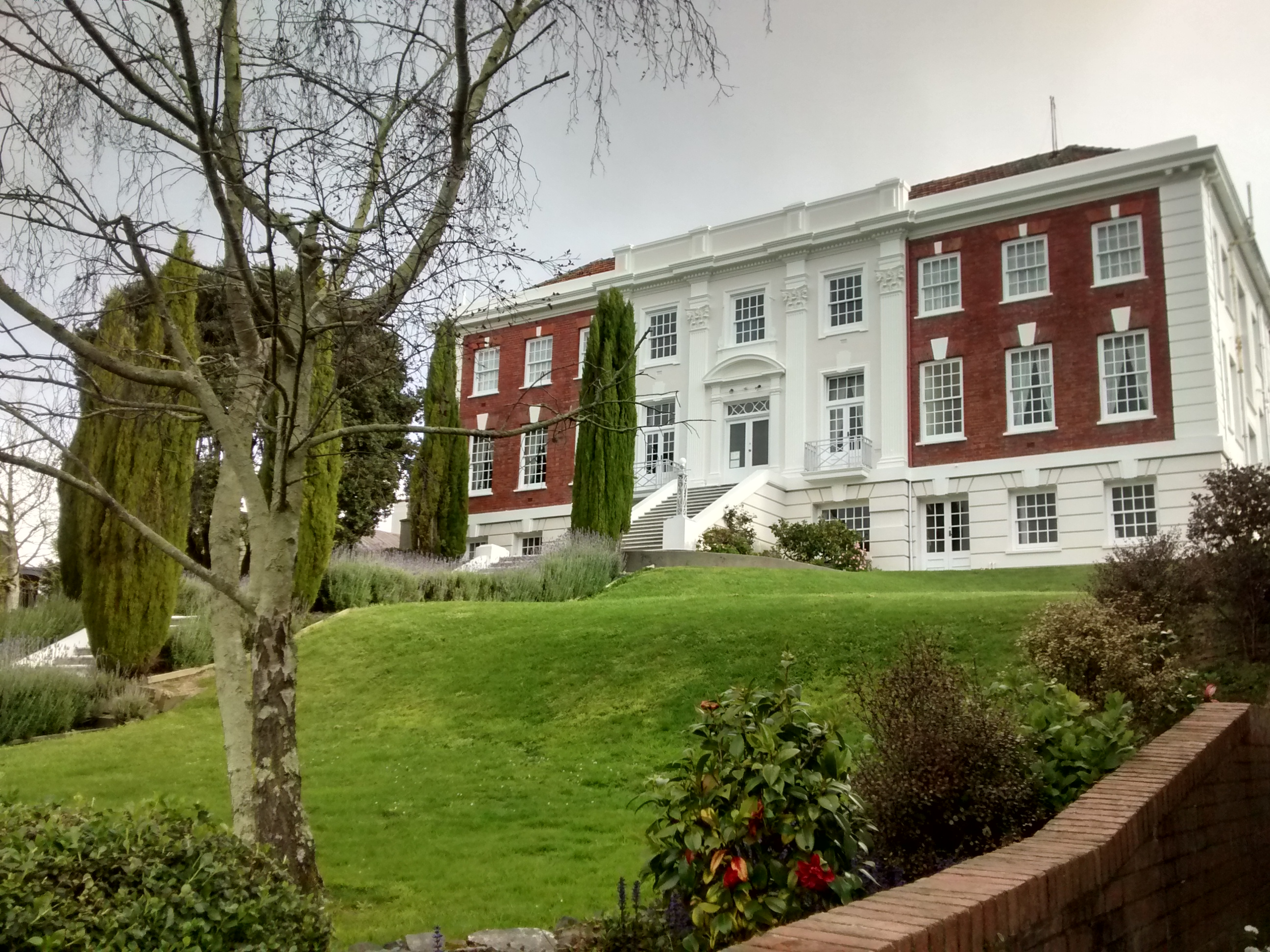
The School of Practical Philosophy on Aro Street

=== School enrolment zone ===
Aro Valley is within the enrolment zones for Wellington College, Wellington Girls' College, Wellington High School, Wellington East Girls' College, St Oran's College and Te Aro School.

=== Aro Valley Pre-School ===
Aro Valley Pre-School is a licensed early childhood education centre in a purpose-built building situated next to the Aro Valley Community Centre and Aro Park. The pre-school caters to children aged three and four years old, with some younger children attending accompanied by their parents. Once a week they also facilitate a parent-led playgroup for children under three.

=== Features of interest ===
- Aro Valley Community Centre (complex with public hall and pre-school; former site of Holy Family School) and the surrounding Aro park is the site of the Annual Aro Valley Fair, Arolympics and other events through the year.
- Wesleyan Methodist Hall built in 1903 (restored in 2019) at western end of Aro Street has had many community uses and is now flats.
- William Booth Memorial Training College (formerly a Salvation Army officer-training establishment, now the School of Practical Philosophy)
- Mickey Mouse Motors featured in the film Goodbye Pork Pie. It ceased trading in 2003, and is now the brewery Garage Project.
- Aro Valley War Memorial (at the beginning of Holloway Road and the western end of Aro Street)
