= William Booth Memorial Training College (Wellington) =

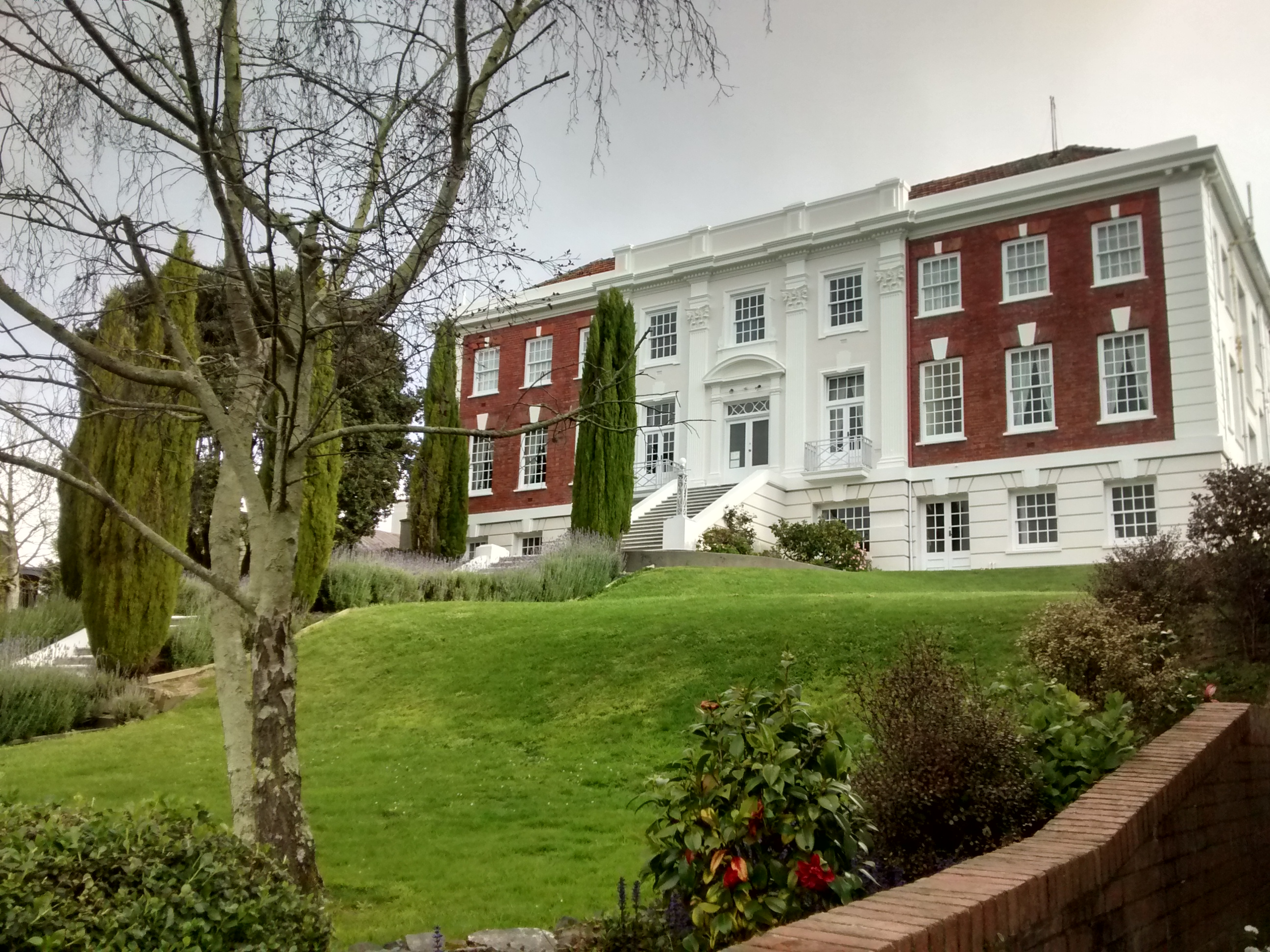
- The building in 2014
- Interactive map of the William Booth Memorial Training College area

General information
- Architectural style: Georgian
- Location: 33 Aro Street, Aro Valley, Wellington, New Zealand
- Coordinates: 41.29622°S 174.76875°E
- Current tenants: School of Practical Philosophy
- Completed: 1913

Design and construction
- Architects: Stanley W Fearn and Austen Quick
- Awards and prizes: NZIA Gold Medal in 1927

The William Booth Memorial Training College is a building on Aro Street, in Aro Valley, Wellington, New Zealand, which currently houses the School of Practical Philosophy and Meditation. It was completed in 1913, and named after one of the founders of the Salvation Army, William Booth.

== Design and construction ==
It was designed by Stanley W Fearn and Austen Quick. It received a gold award from the New Zealand Institute of Architects in 1927.

== Opening ==
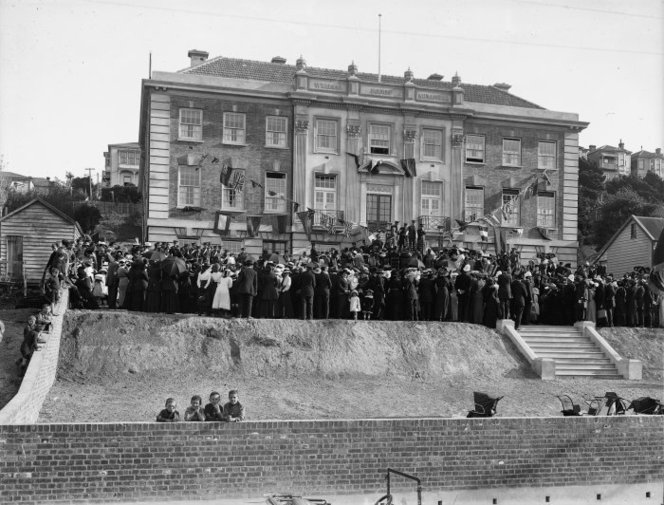
The opening of the Training College in April 1914

It was officially opened on 2 April 1914 by "the Prime Minister, the Minister of Customs, Sir John Findlay, and other prominent public men." Francis Fisher, the Minister of Customs, said:

"We are here to-day to open and dedicate this home to the memory, of the immortal William Booth, founder of this great international Army of Salvation. It was ever the wish and practice of the late General William Booth that every penny controlled by his Army should be spent in the interests of suffering humanity, and to-day, in accordance with the noble spirit inspired by that great man, the Army presents to our citizens a monument to his genius...To General Booth the devoted soldiers of his Army have dedicated the Memorial College. The very atmosphere of the building is hallowed by his spirit."

According to Commissioner Richards, the building cost 13,000 pounds to build, with more expense to be incurred in furnishing the building and improving the grounds yet to come. The building's construction was part of 40,000 pound investment in buildings by the Salvation Army over the preceding 18 months.

According to newspaper reports, Prime Minister William Massey said:

"the Training College was a credit to those who had originated it, to the architect, the builders, and to the Salvation Army. He hoped that within its walls in the years to come there would be trained many officers who would carry on the initiated by William Booth..."

== Operation ==
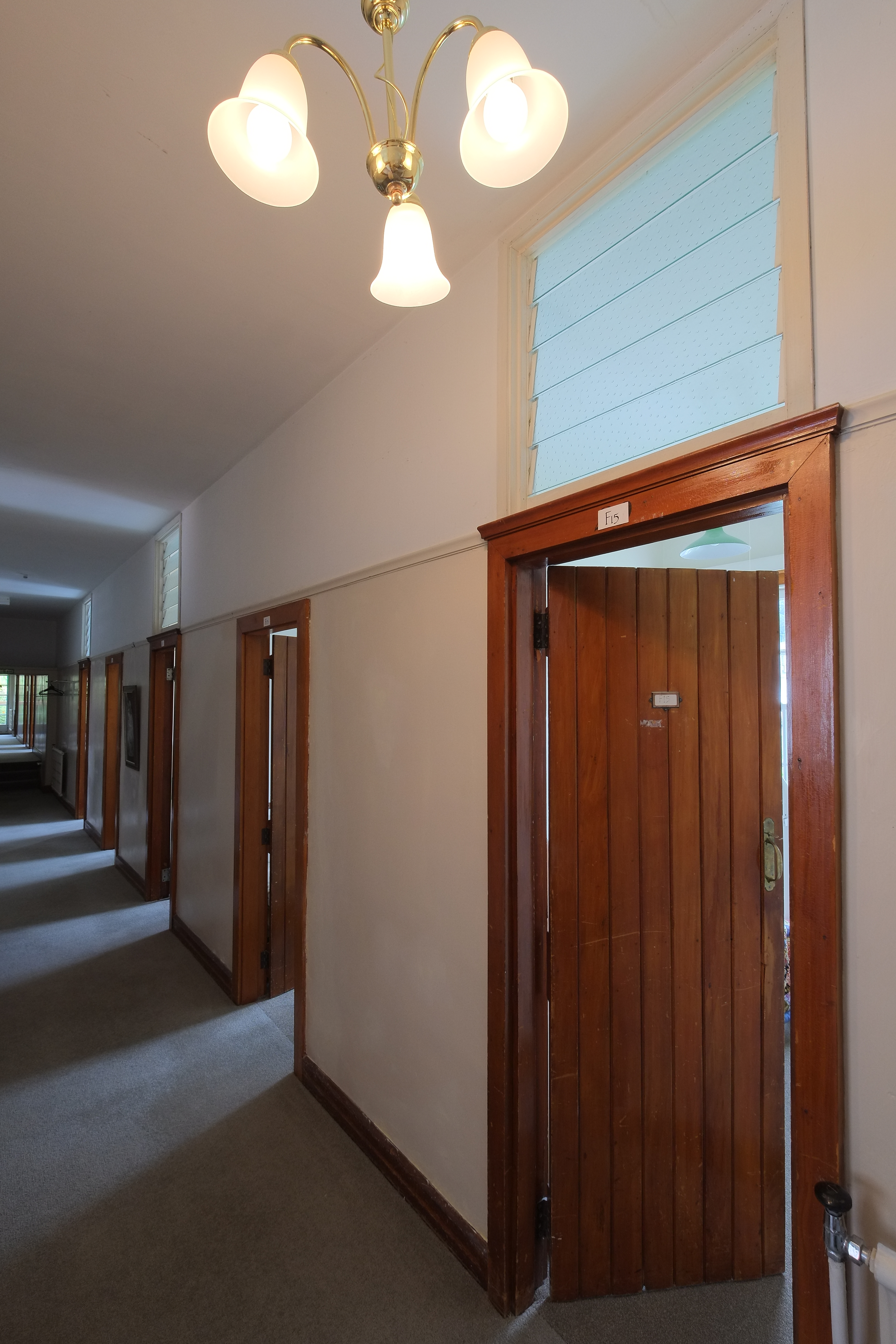
Women's wing

From 1913 to 1982 it was the training site for the Salvation Army, until they shifted to Lower Hutt. In 1933, during the Great Depression, it was closed for a year due to financial reasons.

It now houses the School of Practical Philosophy, a non-profit educational organisation.

The building is individually listed on the Wellington City District Plan as a heritage building, and is listed as earthquake prone.
