= Mitchelltown =

- Suburb
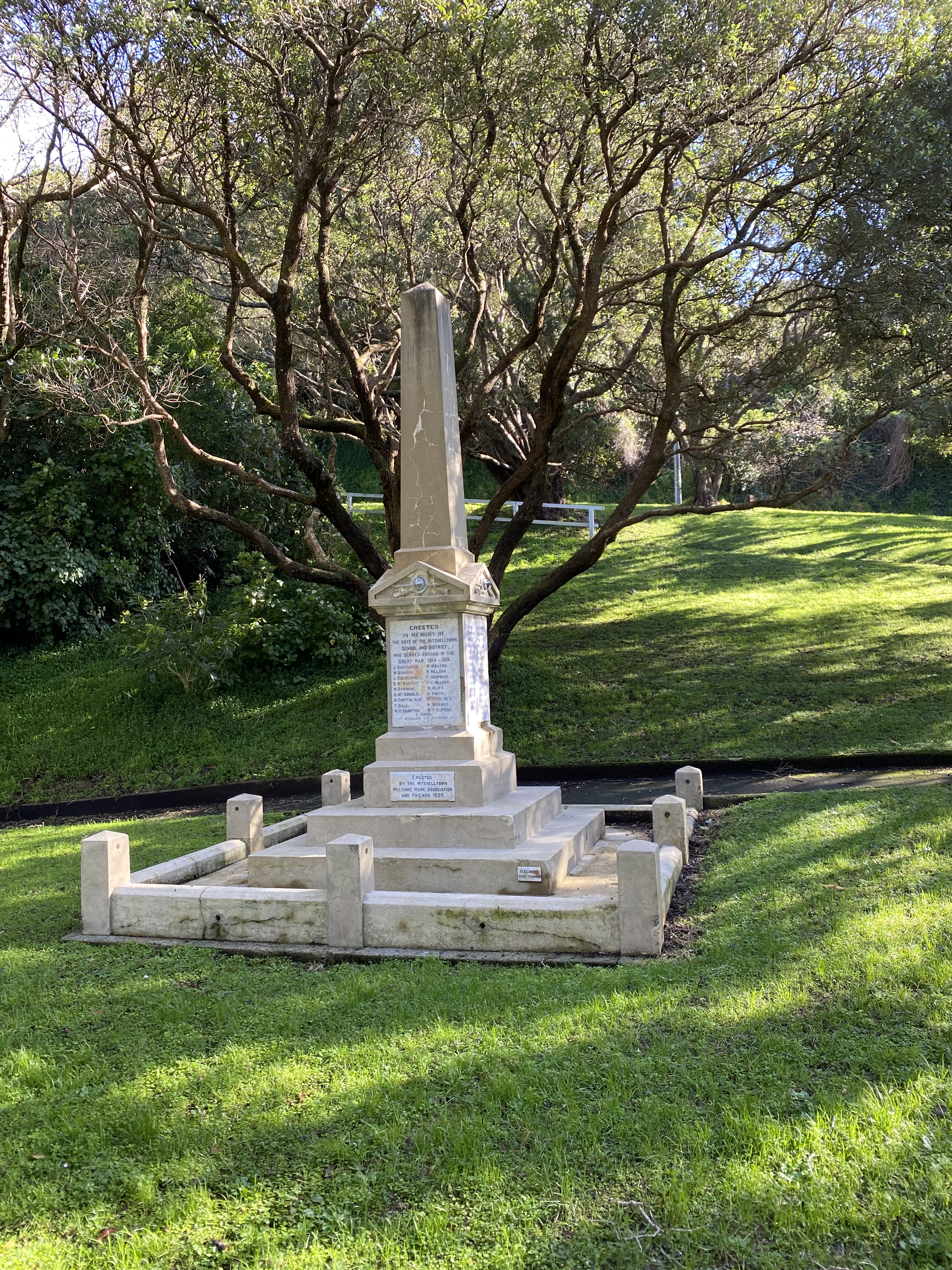
- World War One Memorial, Mitchelltown
- Interactive map of Mitchelltown
- Coordinates: 41°17′49″S 174°45′25″E
- Country: New Zealand
- City: Wellington City
- Local authority: Wellington City Council
- Electoral ward: Pukehīnau/Lambton Ward; Te Whanganui-a-Tara Māori Ward
- Established: 1870s

Area
  - Land: 38 ha (94 acres)

Population (2023 census)
  - Total: 207
  - Density: 540/km^{2} (1,400/sq mi)
- Postcode: 6021

Mitchelltown is a subdivision of the Aro Valley suburb of Wellington, the capital city of New Zealand, under the governance of Wellington City Council. Mitchelltown is located west of Aro Valley.

== History ==
Mitchelltown was founded by Henry Mitchell, who constructed small cottages for unskilled workers in the 1870s. Mitchell arrived in New Zealand as a child from England. He came to New Zealand with his family from Halifax, West Yorkshire. The settlement of Mitchelltown grew up around Holloway Road. The Mitchelltown War Memorial was constructed in 1920. Since the 1990s Mitchelltown started to be gentrified.

== Demographics ==
Mitchelltown covers 0.38 km^{2} (0.15 sq mi). It is part of the Aro Valley statistical area.

Historical population
| Year | Pop. | ±% p.a. |
|---|---|---|
| 2013 | 255 | — |
| 2018 | 213 | −3.54% |
| 2023 | 207 | −0.57% |

Mitchelltown had a population of 207 in the 2023 New Zealand census, a decrease of 6 people (−2.8%) since the 2018 census, and a decrease of 48 people (−18.8%) since the 2013 census. There were 108 males, 90 females, and 12 people of other genders in 75 dwellings. 15.9% of people identified as LGBTIQ+. The median age was 33.1 years (compared with 38.1 years nationally). There were 18 people (8.7%) aged under 15 years, 72 (34.8%) aged 15 to 29, 84 (40.6%) aged 30 to 64, and 33 (15.9%) aged 65 or older.

People could identify as more than one ethnicity. The results were 88.4% European (Pākehā), 8.7% Māori, 2.9% Pasifika, 10.1% Asian, and 5.8% other, which includes people giving their ethnicity as "New Zealander". English was spoken by 95.7%, Māori by 2.9%, and other languages by 21.7%. The percentage of people born overseas was 34.8, compared with 28.8% nationally.

Religious affiliations were 13.0% Christian, 2.9% Hindu, 1.4% Buddhist, 1.4% Jewish, and 1.4% other religions. People who answered that they had no religion were 72.5%, and 7.2% of people did not answer the census question.

Of those at least 15 years old, 93 (49.2%) people had a bachelor's or higher degree, 72 (38.1%) had a post-high school certificate or diploma, and 24 (12.7%) people exclusively held high school qualifications. The median income was $38,300, compared with $41,500 nationally. 42 people (22.2%) earned over $100,000 compared to 12.1% nationally. The employment status of those at least 15 was 96 (50.8%) full-time, 45 (23.8%) part-time, and 12 (6.3%) unemployed.
