= Vivian Street =

Street in Wellington, New Zealand

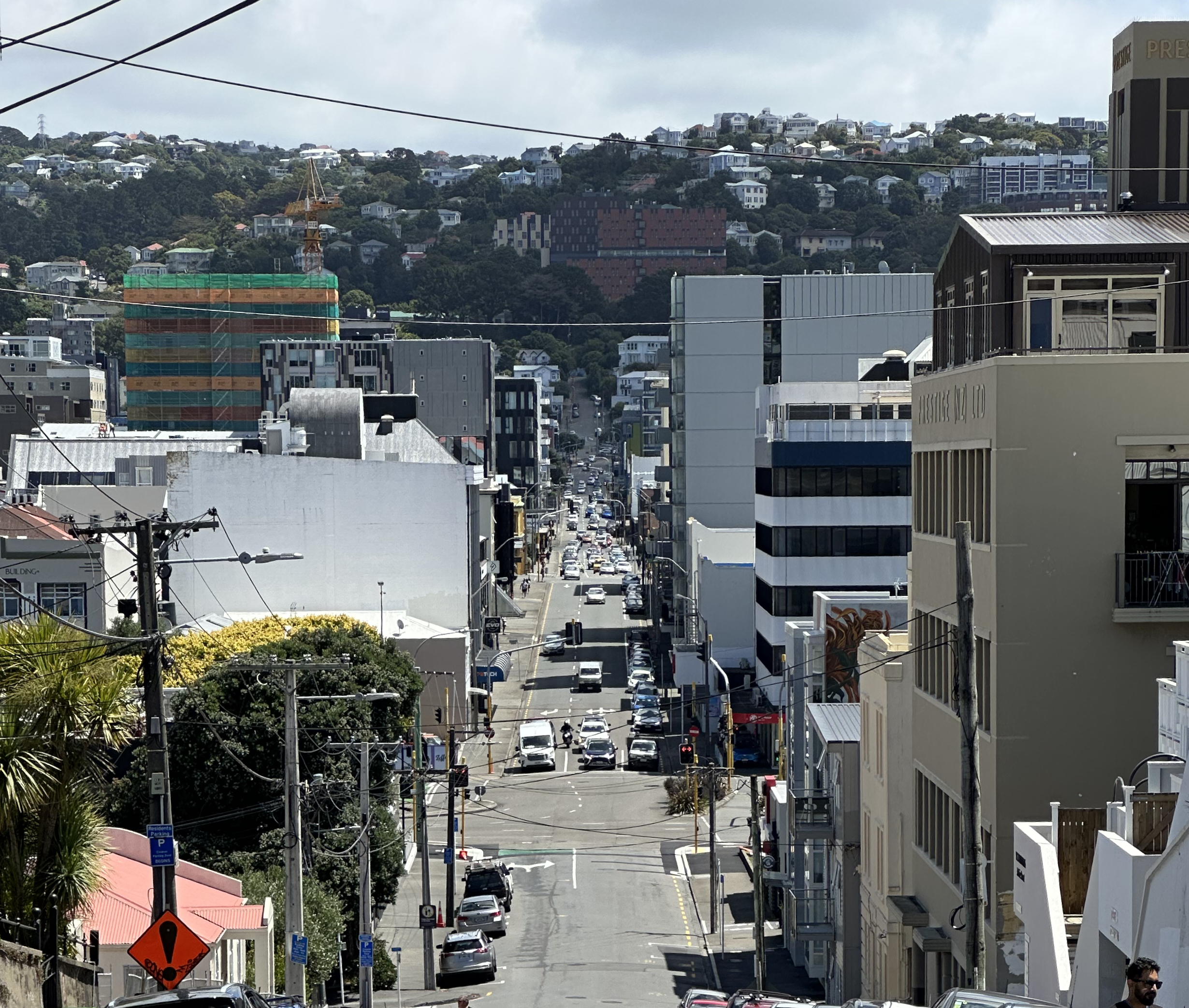
- View from Pirie Street
- Interactive map of Vivian Street
- Location: Wellington, New Zealand
- Coordinates: 41°17′41.23″S 174°46′29.52″E

Vivian Street is a mostly one-way arterial road in central Wellington, New Zealand. It forms a part of the country's State Highway 1 network.

Since March 2007, Vivian Street's one-way direction has flowed east-bound, following the completion of the Wellington Inner City Bypass through Te Aro.

Vivian Street was named after Lord Charles Vivian, a director of the New Zealand Company.

== Red-light district ==
The street was part of Wellington's red-light district, particularly in its western half around the junction of Cuba Street, during most of the 20th century. It contained strip joints, peep shows and illegal brothels. During World War I the area was known as Gallipoli due to the number of soldiers visiting the area. With the decriminalisation of prostitution in the early 21st century, Vivian Street's 'reputation' is undergoing a revival.
