= Spanish Goat Dancer =

EP by HLAH
- Released: 1994
- Genre: Rock music
- Label: Wildside Records

HLAH chronology
13 (1993)	Spanish Goat Dancer (1994)	Flik Y'Self Off Y'Self (1994)

Spanish Goat Dancer is an EP released by New Zealand band, HLAH in 1994 on Wildside Records. Spanish Goat Dancer is off the album Flik Y'Self Off Y'Self. The songs Hitskin and 7 Stripes of the Maumau are covers of Hallelujah Picassos

== Track listing ==
1. "Spanish Goat Dancer
2. "Regular Guy
3. "Hitskin"
4. "Raw Sock"
5. "Stained & Piss Yellow
6. "Pops Pox 'n' Vox"
7. "Velvet Kushion"
8. "Knives in This Tray"
9. "Karaoke Cowboy"
10. "7 Stripes of the Mau Mau"
11. "Cigarette Hell"
12. "Plonk Plonk"
13. "I'm 16 & I Listen to Ozzy"
14. "Radio Shack 301"
15. "The Dog Song"
16. "Roland Goes Nuts"
17. "This Cowboys Outta Hair"
18. "Lost Wisdom Teeth"
19. "Birth"
20. "Rise"
