= Murray Cammick =

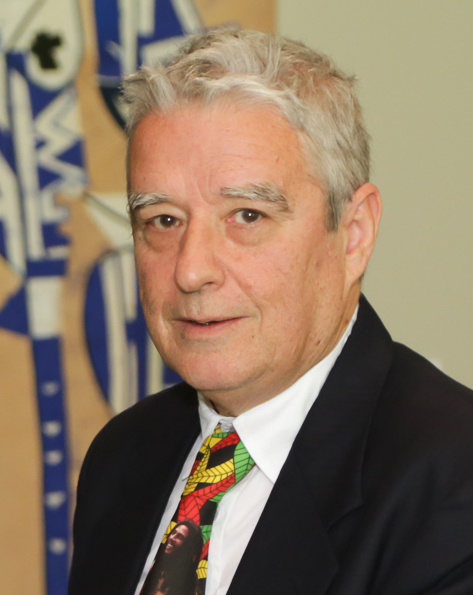
Cammick in 2020

Murray Ernest Cammick ONZM is a New Zealand popular music journalist, photographer and record label founder. He has been a significant figure in New Zealand popular music since the late 1970s.

== Biography ==
Born in Auckland, Cammick, a school teacher and collector of soul music, launched Rip It Up magazine with Alastair Dougal in July 1977 as a free magazine. Initially ignored by the local record industry, the magazine quickly found favour with local bands. It struggled to survive until CBS Records came on board with a commitment to advertise in 1978.

With a staff of one for many years, Cammick operated as editor, publisher, photographer and layout artist as his readership grew. His support for early New Zealand indie labels such as Propeller Records and Flying Nun Records played a huge part in their success.

Extra, a short lived quarterly addition in 1980, did not survive. He launched Cha-Cha, a street style magazine edited by future Academy Awards winner Ngila Dickson, in 1983 and Shake, a pop magazine, in 1986.

Over the years Rip It Up, its magazines and its take-no-prisoners approach to journalism provided a crucial training ground for many New Zealand writers and journalists. Amongst those who received their grounding there are Louise Chunn, Russell Brown, Chris Bourke and Chad Taylor. Tax problems forced Cammick to sell the group in 1994 to publisher Barry Colman (publisher of the National Business Review) but he remained as editor until 1998.

In 1989 he launched the first of his record labels, Southside Records. The label released many of the earliest New Zealand hip hop recordings, including albums by the Upper Hutt Posse, Moana and the Moahunters, MC OJ & Rhythm Slave and the earliest released work of the Fuemana family (as Houseparty).

Wildside Records, a rock music label, was launched in 1991. Wildside's roster included Shihad, Head Like A Hole, Rumblefish, Second Child, Hallelujah Picassos, Dead Flowers and, for a time, Bailter Space. Cammick's financial commitment, drive and belief were crucial to the later success of Shihad. A third label, Felix, was for the more pop acts signed by Cammick.

His radio shows on Radio bFM (Land Of the Good Groove) from 1983 til 1993, and George FM (Soulfinger), have had a large and dedicated following. In November 2012 Land of the Good Groove returned to 95bFM and currently airs there.

In 2016 he was presented with a Scroll of Honour from the Variety Artists Club of New Zealand for services to New Zealand entertainment. In the 2020 New Year Honours, Cammick was appointed an Officer of the New Zealand Order of Merit, for services to the music industry. At the 2020 Taite Music Prize he received the Independent Spirit Award, recognising his lifelong commitment to the local music industry.
