= Double Your Strength, Improve Your Health, & Lengthen Your Life =

Studio album by HLAH
- Released: September 1996
- Recorded: At Sing Sing Studios, Victoria, Australia
- Genre: Rock music
- Label: Wildside Records
- Producer: HLAH

HLAH chronology
| Flik Y'Self Off Y'Self (1994) | Double Your Strength, Improve Your Health, & Lengthen Your Life (1996) | Are You Gonna Kiss It Or Shoot It? (1998) |

Double Your Strength, Improve Your Health, & Lengthen Your Life is the third full-length album released by New Zealand band, HLAH.

== Track listing ==
1. "Keith"
2. "Beige Overalls for the Tradesman"
3. "Jelly Bag"
4. "Alien Wheeler"
5. "Cornbag Rides Again"
6. "Sleazebadge"
7. "A lot of fun"
8. "Quade"
9. "Bixby Blues"
10. "Wayne Cotter"
11. "A Crying Shame"
12. "Hootenanny"
13. "The Zwanzi"
