= Best of Wildside =

Greatest hits album by Wildside Records
- Released: 1999
- Label: Wildside Records

Best of Wildside is a 71 minute New Zealand compilation album featuring artists under the record label, Wildside Records, released in 1999. It appeared in the New Zealand's top ten compilation albums charts for eight weeks between 29 August and 17 October 1999, peaking at #3.

== Track listing ==
1. "La La Land" - Shihad
2. "Wet Rubber" - Head like a Hole
3. "Don't Wanna Know" - Muckhole
4. "Bullet in my Hand" - Slim
5. "Got the Ju" - Weta
6. "Interconnector" - Shihad
7. "Nark" - Pumpkinhead
8. "I Wanna Know" - Dead Flowers
9. "I'm On Fire" - Head Like a Hole
10. "Surf to Hell" - SML
11. "Picasso Core" - Hallelujah Picassos
12. "Cool Guy" - Muckhole
13. "Faster Hooves" - Head Like a Hole
14. "Bitter" - Shihad
15. "Shovel" - Future Stupid
16. "Fish Across Face" - Head Like a Hole
17. "Pave it Over" - The Bilge Festival
18. "Rewind" - Hallelujah Picassos
19. "Plastic" - Dead Flowers
20. "Smiley Hands" - Breathe
21. "Right Now" - Bailterspace
