= The Devil Makes Work for Idle Hands =

Greatest hits album by HLAH
- Released: July 2009
- Genre: Rock music
- Label: Wildside Records

HLAH chronology
Blood On the Honky Tonk Floor (2000)	The Devil Makes; Work for Idle Hands (2009)

The Devil Makes Work for Idle Hands is a greatest hits album released by the New Zealand band Head Like A Hole in 2009 to support their 2009 reunion tour.

== Track listing ==
1. Chalkface
2. Comfortably Shagged
3. Mr Bastard
4. Fish Across Face
5. Sleazebadge
6. Faster Hooves
7. Cornbag
8. Chevrolet
9. Nevermind Today
10. Maharajah
11. I'm On Fire
12. Doctors And Nurses
13. Top Heavy
14. Wallow
15. Spanish Goat Dancer
16. Keith
17. Crying Shame
18. Wet Rubber
19. Hootenanny
20. Air
21. Velvet Kushion
