= Dixon Street =

Street in Wellington, New Zealand

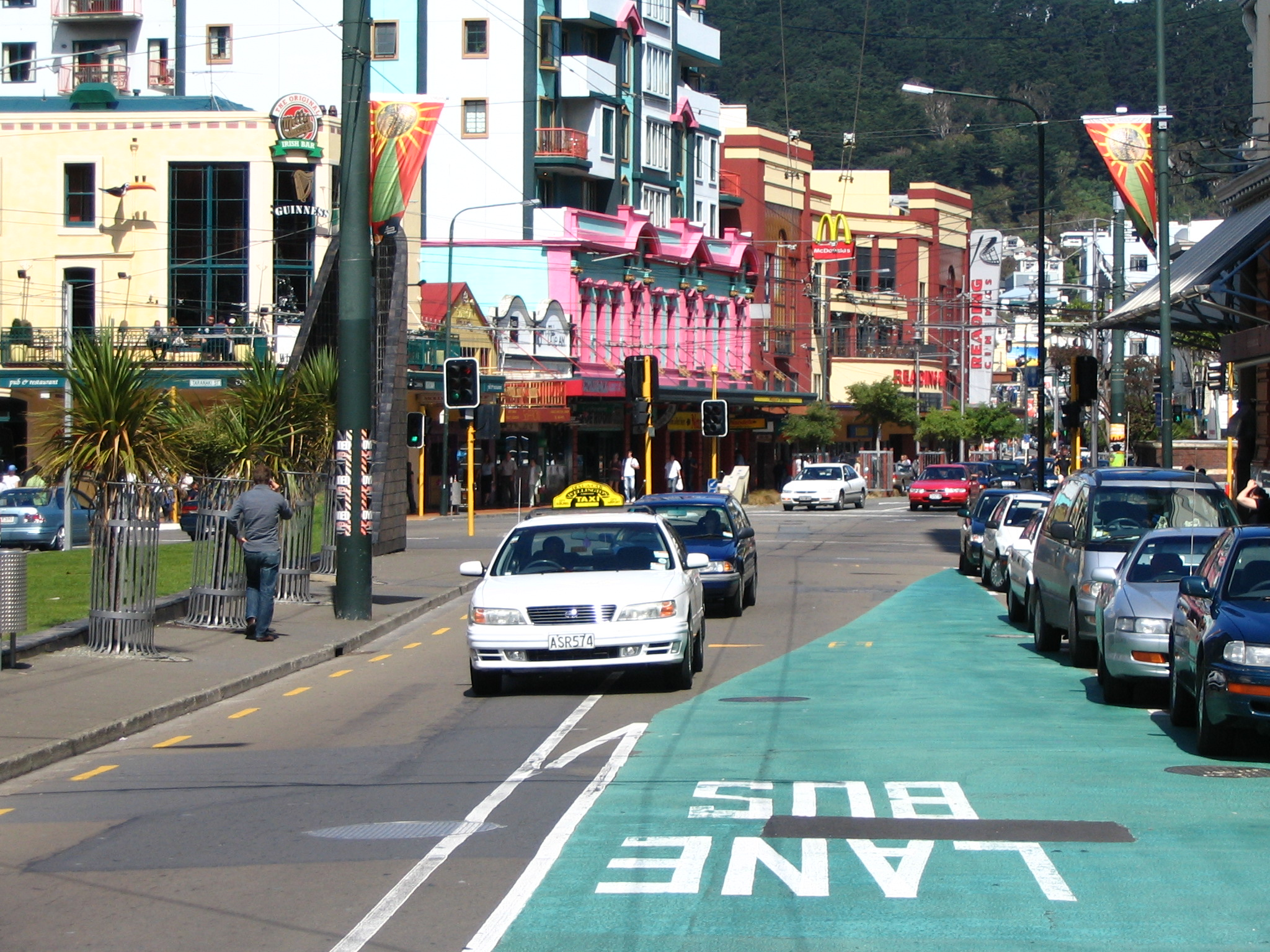
Dixon Street in c. 2006

Dixon Street is a street in the Wellington, New Zealand, suburb of Te Aro. It runs from The Terrace in the west to Taranaki Street in the east. Notable streets that intersect it include Willis Street and Cuba Street, the Cuba Street rainbow crossing being in Dixon Street. Dixon Street is split into two sections, separated by a staircase near Willis Street, as the land there is too steep for vehicles.

== Location ==
Dixon Street is located in the inner-city suburb of Te Aro. The street runs from The Terrace in the west to Taranaki Street in the east. There are two sections of Dixon Street, connected by steps known as the Dixon Street Steps, near Willis Street. The sections are split apart as the land inbetween is too steep for vehicles. Cuba Street and Willis Street intersect Dixon Street.

== History ==
In Wellington's original city plan, the street was spelt Dickson. Despite this, it is believed to be named after John Dixon, a member of the New Zealand Company. In 2018 the Cuba Street rainbow crossing was painted in the intersection between Cuba and Dixon Streets.

In 2021 a transport consultancy firm proposed creating "traffic cells". Vehicles would be able to enter and exit these cells, but would not be able to drive between cells without using a "boundary road". In the proposal, non-boundary streets would give more priority to cyclists and pedestrians. The proposal included modifying Dixon Street to reduce through traffic between The Terrace and Taranaki Street. At the time, councillor Tamatha Paul stated that she was considering suggesting an amendment to the proposal, in which Dixon Street would be pedestrianised between Taranaki Street and Victoria Street. In November 2021 councillors voted 11-3 in favour of the amendment, which also included reducing car traffic in Cuba Street.

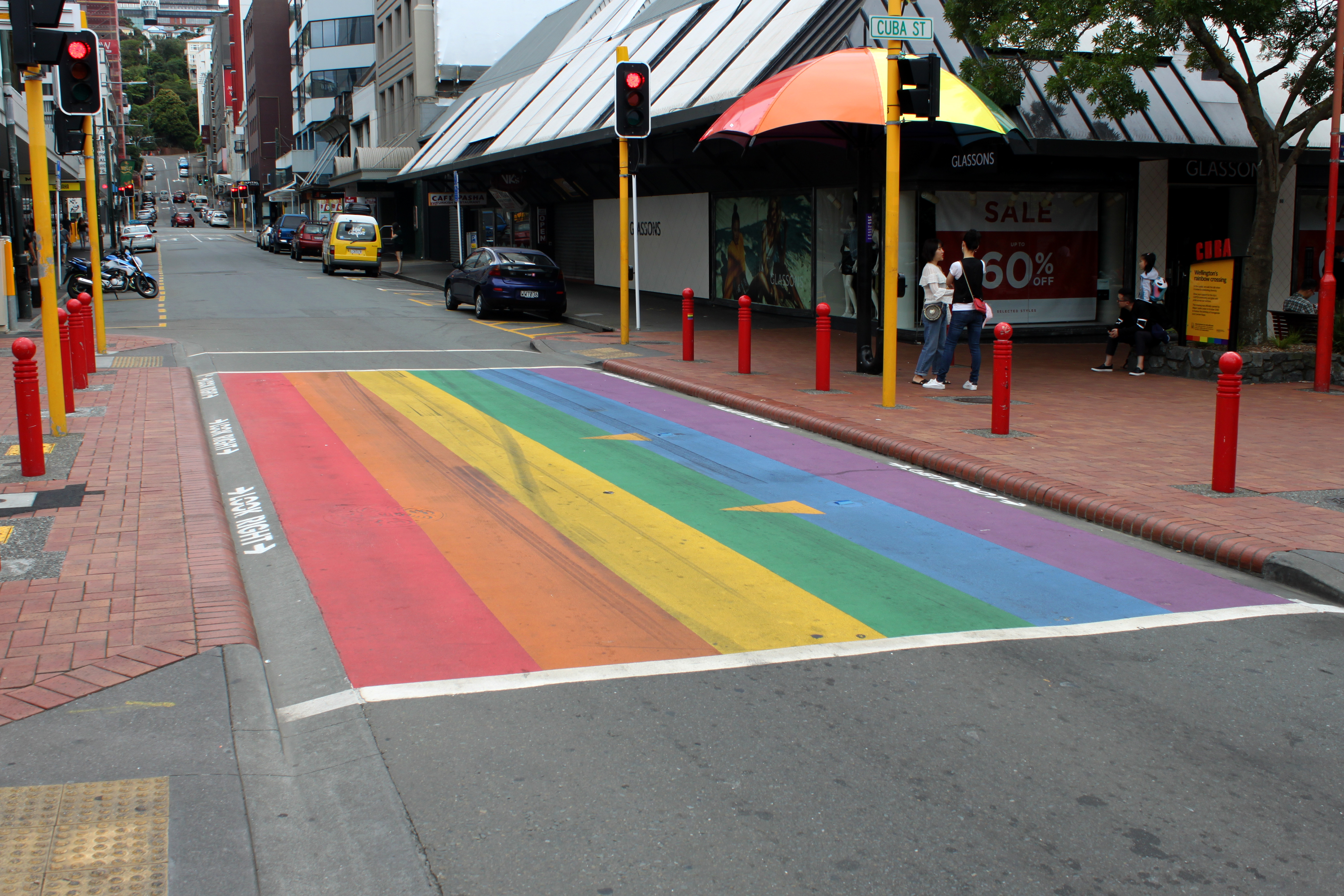
Cuba Street rainbow crossing

In 2021 the Wellington community expressed that they felt unsafe in the area around Te Aro Park and Dixon Street. That year the Wellington City Council, other government organisations and businesses launched the Pōneke Promise, a $7.7 million commitment to reduce crime in the city, including Te Aro Park, Dixon Street, Courtenay Place and Cuba Street. Plans made in the promise involved crime prevention through environmental design. In 2022 the Dixon Street footpaths near Te Aro Park were widened, adding wooden decking. In that area planters were added to slow car traffic and to better separate the vehicle and pedestrian spaces. Parklets were also added to both sides of the street, giving people spaces to eat, and Locky Docks (bicycle lockers) were installed in one parklet. These changes were made by removing 30 of the 41 on-street parking spaces. Two speed cushions were also added in 2022.

== Dixon Street Steps ==
The Dixon Street Steps in 2026

The Dixon Street Steps is a staircase connecting both sections of Dixon Street. It forms a zig-zag shape, in a heavily planted area. The steps are in an area between houses, and several homes directly connect to the steps. According to Wellington City Heritage, the Dixon Street Steps are one of the most frequently used pedestrian shortcuts in the city, and are one of only two sets of steps mentioned in the Wellington district plan, despite there being hundreds of similar shortcuts in the city.

The steps were created in 1879, out of timber, to give Te Aro residents access to The Terrace. Use of the steps increased after the creation of the suburb of Kelburn, and Victoria University. In 1897 it was reported that "the steps are now old, much worn as rotten and broken away and looking to fault in original design they urgently require to be reconstructed". After an unknown amount of time, the steps were paved. Lighting was installed in 1915. The stairs were repaired in 1944 and 1953. In 1955 a handrail was installed. In 1974 the William H. Denton Trust donated $1,600 "for the purpose of beautifying the Dixon Street Steps/Zig-zag area"; a plaque at the bottom of the steps mentions this. In 1988 a memorial bench was placed in the area, for the activist Elizabeth Sewell, who had died that year.

== Te Aro Park ==
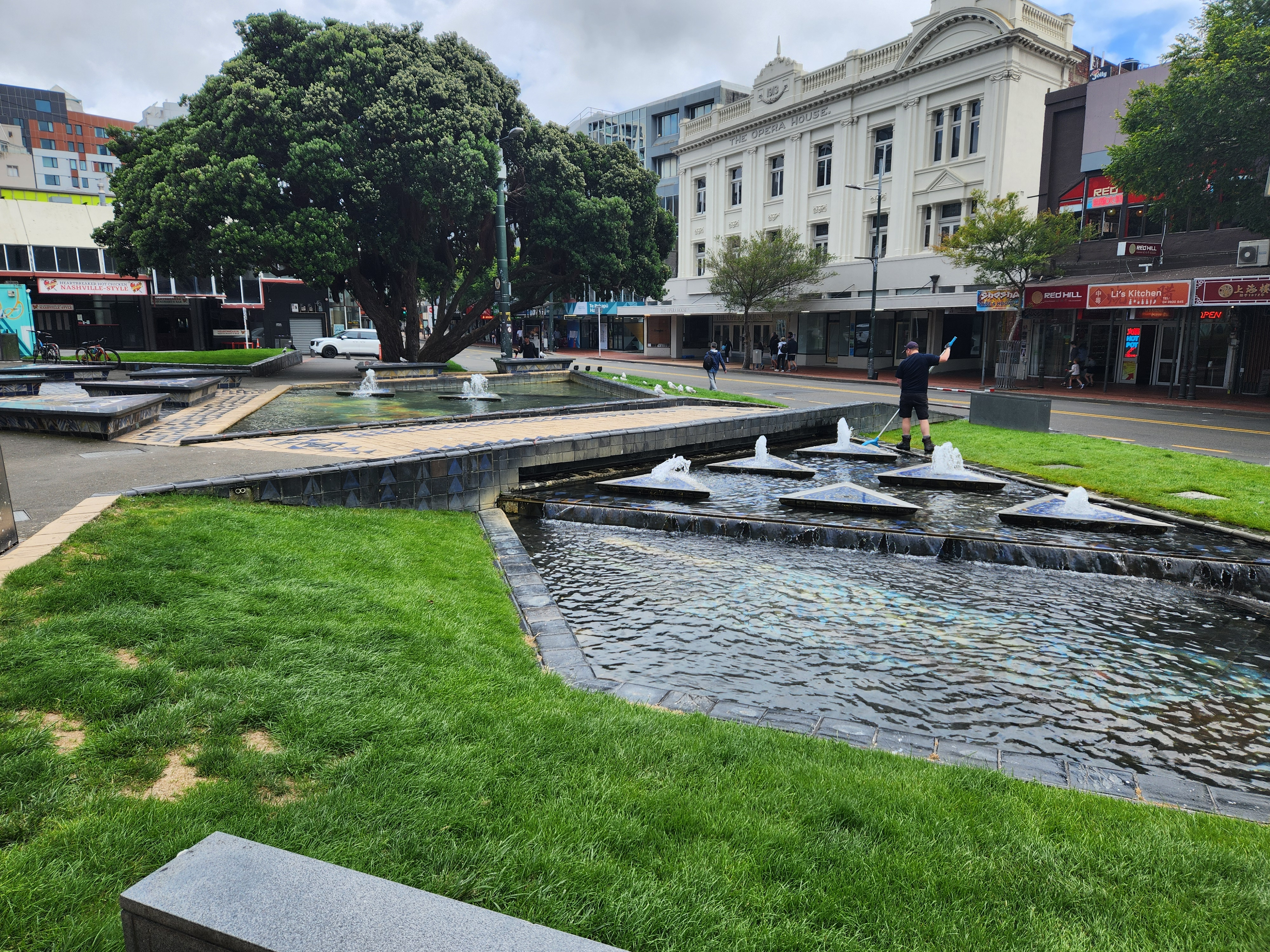
Te Aro Park in 2026

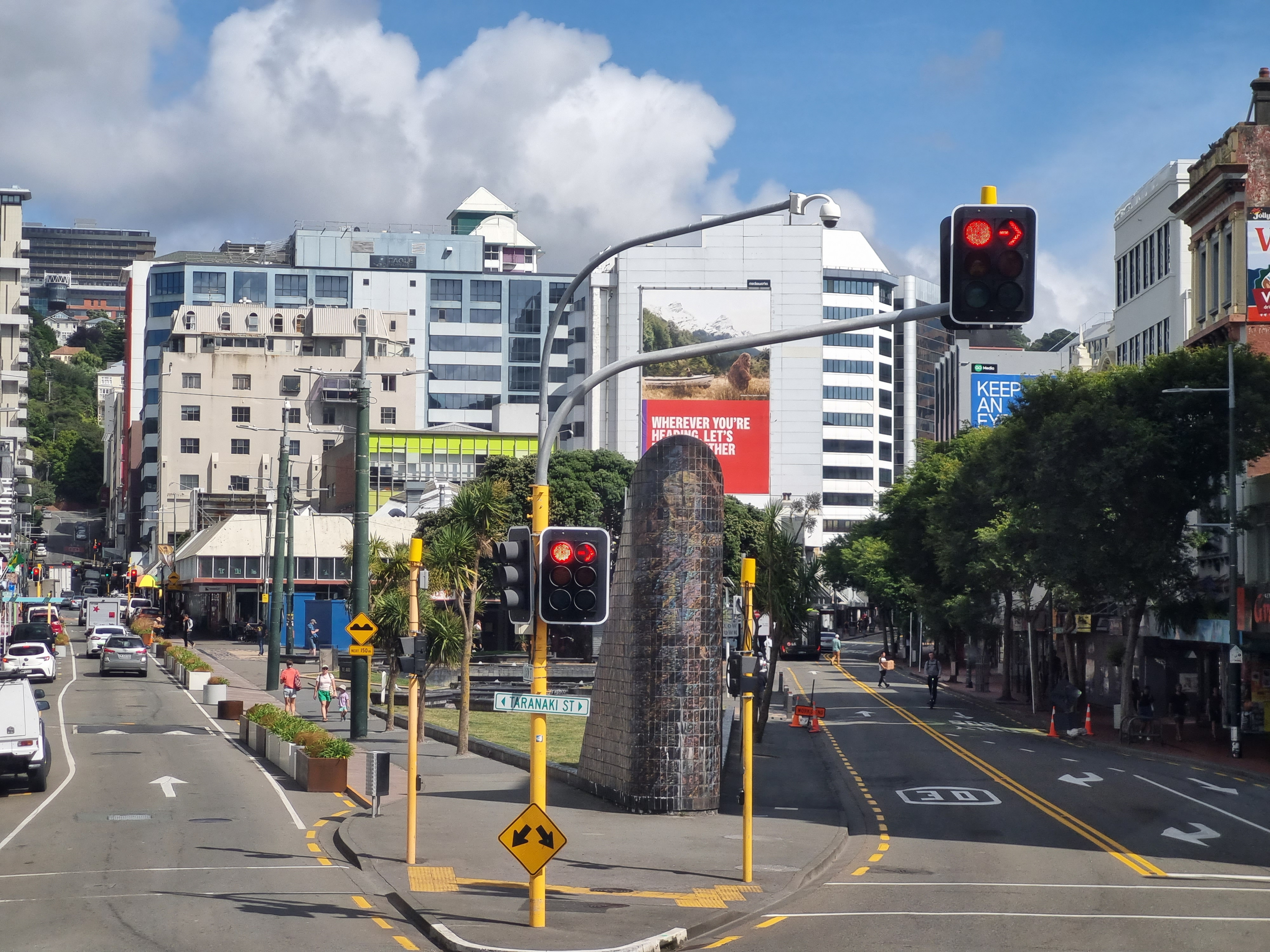
The prow at Te Aro Park, between Dixon Street (left) and Manners Street (right)

Te Aro Park (formerly commonly known as Pigeon Park) is a small public park situated on a triangular piece of land between Manners Street and Dixon Street. Te Aro Pā was close to this location but by the 1880s very few Māori remained at the site. The Council bought the land in the 1870s, and it became known as Market Reserve and then Manners Street Reserve. In 1910 buildings on the site were demolished and a park created, with public toilets at the western end. An electrically operated clock was installed at the eastern end of the park in 1927 by the Tramways Department, but has since been moved further along to a pedestrian area in Courtenay Place. In 1939 a memorial and drinking fountain were installed by Taranaki Street Wesleyan Church to commemorate the centenary of Wesleyan missionaries landing in Wellington and preaching to Māori at Te Aro Pā. The memorial was retained in the redeveloped park.

In 1988 Wellington City Council approved a design by Shona Rapira Davies for redevelopment of the park as a symbolic waka (canoe). The project, named Te Waimapihi, ended up costing over $800,000, more than three times the amount agreed with Davies, and was finished a year later than agreed. A documentary was made about Davies' work on the park and the controversy that surrounded the project. The redeveloped park was opened in May 1992. A tiled upright structure forms the prow of the canoe, and trees planted at intervals along the sides represent paddlers. Paving at the park is formed from 30,000 clay tiles handmade by Davies and imprinted with plants and names. Warning signs had to be installed when it was discovered that the tiles become extremely slippery when wet. Triangular shapes throughout the park evoke Māori weaving, and flowing water in the park's pools represents cleansing and renewal. A piece of pounamu (greenstone) was buried under the prow at the opening ceremony.

From around 2018 anti-social behaviour at the park increased, and in August 2020 a police report on the area was submitted to Wellington City Council for review. The report identified problems including gang members and vulnerable people in nearby emergency housing, easy availability of alcohol from numerous outlets near the park and problems in and around the public toilets at the park. The police report led to publication by the Council of Te Aro Park – Assessing Harm in September 2020. Proposed changes to the park included increased camera surveillance and better sightlines, better lighting, increased patrols by police and Māori wardens and possible removal of the toilet block. The report also identified a need to increase awareness of and mana of the artwork formed by the park's design and tiles. In early 2021 the City Council, in partnership with police and other organisations, launched 'The Pōneke Promise', an initiative to make people feel safer in the inner city. As part of this initiative, in 2022 the City Council removed car parks along one side of Te Aro Park and replaced them with a $600,000 timber boardwalk and planter boxes. The stated aim was to increase visibility around the park, make it look nicer, slow traffic and create more pedestrian space. The changes to the park did not address the issue of problems with people loitering in the park. The Council demolished the public toilets in the park in November 2022, saying this would lead to increased vibrancy in the area. The Council announced that permanent replacement facilities would not be built for over a year, probably in 2024, but that it intended to place some temporary toilets in a nearby street within a few months.

== Dixon Street Flats ==
Dixon Street Flats is a historic building in Wellington, New Zealand, designed by the Housing Division of the Ministry of Works. It is on Dixon Street.
