= Freak the Sheep Vol. 2 =

Freak The Sheep Vol. 2

Compilation album by Flying Nun Records
- Released: 1992
- Label: Flying Nun Records

Flying Nun Records chronology
Freak The Sheep	Freak The Sheep Vol. 2

Freak the Sheep Volume 2 was a New Zealand compilation album organised by the bNet student radio network. It was named after a bFM New Zealand music radio show that has been running since 1987. Unlike the previous Freak the Sheep compilation which focused on Auckland bands, this compilation had bands from around the country. The concept was similar to the 1986 National Student Radio Weird Culture Weird Custom compilation LP, which launched the careers of Cassandra's Ears and the Puddle.

At the time of release it was very difficult for uncommercial bands to release music, and most bands on the compilation had only self-released cassettes that were only available in their own towns. The Cyclops and the Axel Grinders had previous releases on international labels, but this was their first release in their own country. It was the first release from Into The Void, a Christchurch band that performed for several decades.

It was released by the Flying Nun label in 1992 on cassette and CD.

== Track listing ==
1. "Fat Little Man - Head Like a Hole
2. "Swill of the Gods" - Axel Grinders
3. "God" - Blue Marbles
4. "Gettin' My Thing Together" - Gestalt
5. "Made Easy" - Swim Everything
6. "In the Ear" - Tinnitus
7. "Real Swingers" - Leaders of Style
8. "Gash" - Into the Void
9. "Falling Golden Trumpets" - Cyclops
10. "Will Shiver" - Book of Martyrs
11. "Abacus" - Lushburger
12. "Ego" - Queen Meanie Puss
