= Head Like a Hole (band) =

New Zealand band

Head like a Hole
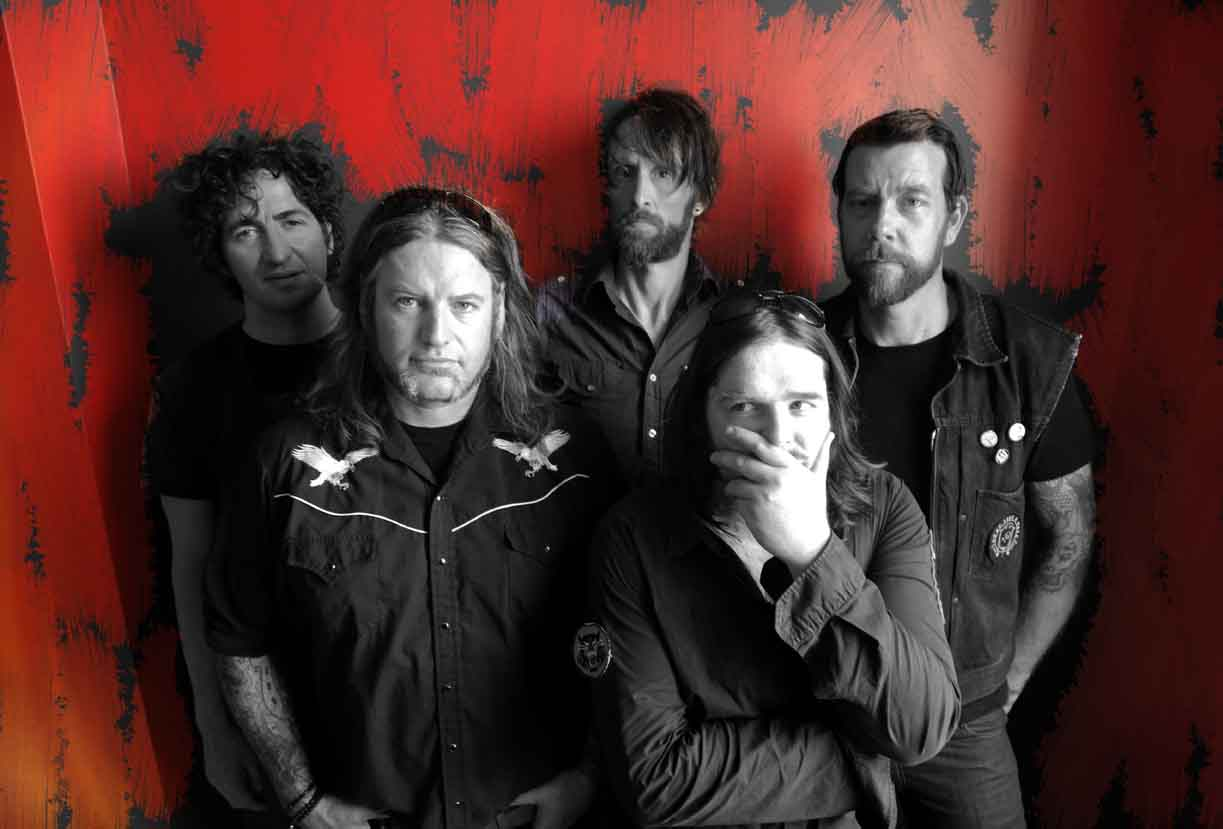
- Head Like a Hole in 2010

Background information
- Origin: Wellington, New Zealand
- Years active: 1990–2000, 2009–present
- Label: Wildside Records
- Members: Booga Beazley; Nigel Regan; Michael Franklin-Browne; Andrew Ashton; Simon Nicholls
- Past members: Mark Hamill; Tom Watson; Andrew Durno

Head Like a Hole (often shortened to HLAH to avoid copyright issues) is a rock band from Wellington, New Zealand. The group is named after the Nine Inch Nails song of the same name.

== History ==
HLAH formed in Wellington, originally comprising Nigel Regan, Mark "Hiddee Beast" Hamill, Nigel "Booga" Beazley and Andrew Durno. Previous to HLAH forming Regan and Hamill played in a covers band playing songs by artists such as early Masters of Reality, Black Sabbath, Faith No More, Nirvana, Butthole Surfers, Mudhoney and Fugazi. "It wasn't a cover band as such that we played gigs and got paid, more an excuse to get together jam and bash out songs we could play" says Regan.

At the end of 1989 Beazley returned to Wellington from art school in Auckland and was roped in as singer (even though he had never sung or been in a band in his life), as Regan and Hamill's latest singer and bass player had left and they wished to form an original band. The three of them went to their practice space at the 'Hopper Street Warehouse' in Wellington and after blasting though a rendition of "War Pigs" by Black Sabbath to see if Beazley could actually sing, the decision was made and the band was born, minus a name and a bass player which was soon rectified by the addition of Andrew 'Tall' Durno who Hamill had met at a party and invited along to a practice.

Not long after the band was fully formed, for a bottle of Whiskey and $100, they recorded their first self-penned songs on an 8 track at (now defunct) Tongue studios in Wellington above the pool hall on Manners Street. This became their first self-released cassette titled Shitnoise. Only 100 copies of this were made and these are now sought after.

Around this time Head Like a Hole shared a run down practice room at the old Empire Spice warehouse on Hopper Street with local act Shihad. After an off the cuff remark from Jon Toogood that HLAH should support Shihad on their up-and-coming Devolve tour Regan rang Gerald Dwyer (Shihad's then manager) and said "Hi, I'm Nigel from Head Like a Hole and we're coming on tour with Shihad" to which Dwyer replied "Is that right?". Toogood had neglected to actually inform Dwyer of this. However, seeing the benefits in it, Dwyer stopped in to see HLAH playing upstairs at the Empire Warehouse and the idea was put into play, and it was on this tour that Regan for lack of a suitable 'rock wardrobe' hit upon the idea of playing naked.

They started off playing small gigs at the Hopper Street warehouse, The Carpark, and Rocky's pub and soon started touring the university circuit. Having taken the name Head Like a Hole the band gained a following with outrageous gigs, performing naked and caked with mud, or with complete face and body paint. With a strong and dedicated following, HLAH got signed to Wildside Records, who at around the same time signed another Wellington act, Shihad.

== 13 ==
In 1992, they recorded their first album, 13, at Writhe Studio. The band produced it themselves with the assistance of Brent McLachlan (Bailter Space, Gordons). One of the singles off the album, Fish Across Face made the New Zealand Top 10, however the video was pulled off air because of a scene where orange juice streamed from Nigel's mouth into Booga's mouth (there happened to be a meningitis outbreak at the time). 13 remains a fan favourite to this day while the band look at it as a learning curve as they were not really ready to record a full-length album and their only previous recording experience was the 4 track cassette Shitnoise. It is a good representation of the band at the time who wore their influences on their sleeve's loudly and proudly.

== Flik Y'Self off Y'Self ==
HLAH continued touring the university orientation circuit and in 1993 returned to the studio to record material for a new album. The new album was recorded and given the title, Flik Y'Self Off Y'Self. It was released in 1994 and supported by two singles as well as The Not Nicomjool EP featuring a remix of the track "Chalkface". "Faster Hooves" was released, along with a video which featured Mark and Booga having a western style shoot out with finger guns. The other single was "Spanish Goat Dancer".

== Double Your Strength, Improve Your Health and Lengthen Your Life ==
HLAH continued touring the country (including playing at the Big Day Out festival) and tragically in early 1996 their manager, Gerald Barry Dwyer (who also managed Shihad) died suddenly. They returned to the studio later in the year, this time at Sing Sing Studios in Australia with producer Robbie Rowlands to record their third album, Double Your Strength, Improve Your Health, & Lengthen Your Life. "Crying Shame" while not having any chart success became a popular song in the band's set which they still perform, often using ring in Trumpeters and/or other brass as Watson who originally played the trumpet is no longer a member of the band.

The first single off the album, "Cornbag" was released in November 1996, and received some limited chart success. This was followed by the release of the album and more singles including "A Crying Shame", "Keith" and "Hootnanny". HLAH performed at the 1997 Big Day Out as the final act after the headliners Soundgarden, and had a huge crowd in The Supertop. HLAH also released a video for their cover of "I'm on Fire", a Bruce Springsteen song.

== Are ya Gonna Kiss It or Shoot It ==
Around this time (1997–98) some confusion over the band's name was created by a record company rep accidentally releasing a statement saying the band had changed their name to HLAH. This was not actually the case as Head Like a Hole had been using the abbreviation HLAH for many years. In November 1998, the band released its final original album, HLAH:IV - Are You Gonna Kiss It Or Shoot It?, along with accompanying singles, "Wet Rubber" and "Juicy Lucy".

== Blood On The Honky Tonk Floor ==
Sometime in 2000, the band disbanded. A 'Best of' album was released in November, entitled Blood On the Honky Tonk Floor. Blood On the Honkey Tonk Floor featured two discs, the first covering the band's best and most recognised songs, while the second included all of the cover songs the band had recorded over their career.

== Reformation ==
In late 2008, HLAH were asked if they would consider reforming for the Vodafone Homegrown music festival in March 2009. As they had previously discussed reforming a couple of years earlier (which never came to fruition) they decided that before making any decisions that they would get together to have a jam and run over some of the old material. After a few hours of playing together they decided immediately that they would play Homegrown and the decision was made to play a couple of low key gigs in small venues to warm up before playing Homegrown. Afterwards as the experience had been enjoyable HLAH decided to embark on a winter tour over June July. Although playing to packed venues (including the largest crowd at the Powerstation since re-opening) up and down the country the tour was not successful financially, however after seeing the crowd reaction and realizing that they actually got on better than when they were together in the nineties the decision was made to head back to the rehearsal rooms and start working on an album for 2011. Although asked if he would like to be a part of the band again Tom Watson declined to participate and Mike Franklin-Browne who took over the drums from Mark Hamill continued as the band's drummer.

== Blood Will Out ==
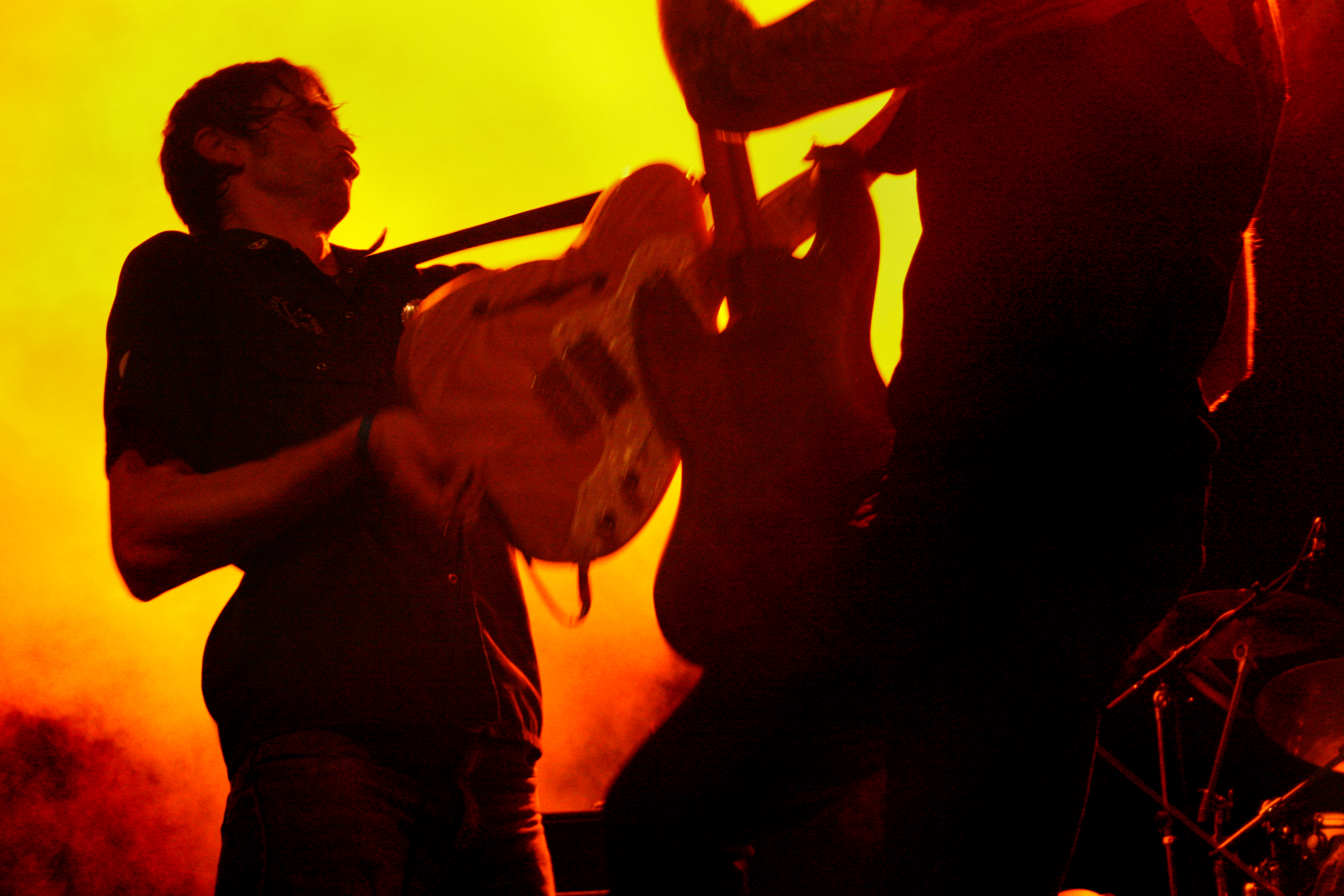
Nigel and Andrew clash guitars at Vodafone Homegrown, Wellington. Photo by Erin Collier

In 2010 Head Like A Hole started working on new material for their first album in a decade. After deciding to work with Andrew Buckton (Midnight youth, The D4) the drum tracks were laid down at York Street Studios with the rest of the tracking done at Studio 203. The first single from the album was 'Swagger of Thieves', released on 5 December 2010. It went to number one the 95bFM charts in December 2010. The second single, "Glory, Glory (Hallelujah)", was released on 29 May 2011 and went to #1 on The Rock. The album, titled Blood Will Out, was released on 4 July 2011, and was accompanied with a New Zealand tour.

== Re-release of 13 (2012–2013) ==
Due to family circumstances, Head Like a Hole did not do many performances in 2012. Instead, the band concentrated on projects such as remastering their debut album 13, planned to be released on its 20th anniversary in 2013. The release was followed by a tour in which the band planned to play the entire album. HLAH also released the track "Sometimes the Wolf", a track that was supposed to be released on Blood Will Out, but it was not completed in time.

== Narcocorrido (2014–2015) ==
With touring not being an option during that time, Nigel Regan, Booga Beazley and Andrew Ashton started working on the follow-up to Blood Will Out. Recording for the band's next studio album took place from 2014-2015. Head Like a Hole's sixth studio album Narcocorrido was self-released on 3 April 2015.

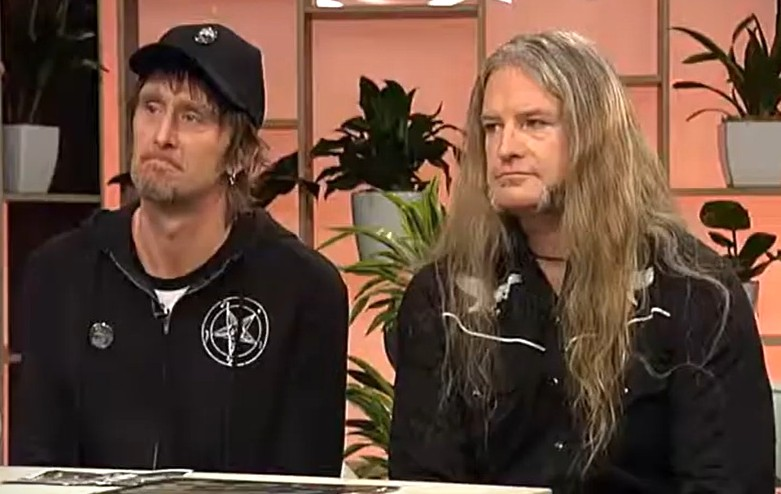
Left to right: Nigel Regan, Andrew Ashton in 2017

== New Music - 2021 ==
Head like a Hole has currently recorded 3 new tracks for release in 2021. Rather than record a new album they are recording in blocks of 3 and were expected to be releasing in 2021. COVID threw a spanner in the works.

== Discography ==
Year	Title	Details	Peak chart positions
Year	Title	Details	NZ
1991	Shitnoise	Released: August 1991; Format: Cassette; Label: Self-released	—
1993	13	Released: 1 March 1992; Label: Wildside Records	17
1994	Spanish Goat Dancer	Released: August 1994; Label: Wildside Records	—
1994	Flik Y'Self Off Y'Self	Released: 1 March 1994; Label: Wildside Records	13
1996	The Berlin Stench	Released: August 1996; Format: Cassette; Label: Self-released	—
1996	Double Your Strength, Improve Your Health, & Lengthen Your Life	Released: 30 September 1996; Label: Wildside Records	33
1998	Are You Gonna Kiss It Or Shoot It?	Released: November 1998; Label: Wildside Records	25
2000	Blood On the Honky Tonk Floor	Released: 26 October 2000; Label: Wildside Records	29
2009	The Devil Makes Work For Idle Hands	Released: 29 June 2009; Format: CD, digital download; Label: Head Like a Hole	—
2011	Blood Will Out	Released: 4 July 2011; Format: CD, digital download; Label: Head Like a Hole	12
2015	Narcocorrido	Released: 3 April 2015; Format: CD, digital download; Label: Head Like a Hole	3
EPs
1995	Happy Families Tour		—
1995	The Not Nicomjool EP	Label: Wildside Records	—
"—" denotes releases that did not chart or were not released in that country.

=== Singles ===
Year	Title	Peak chart positions	Album
Year	Title	NZ	Album
1992	"Fish Across Face"	9	13
1992	"Never Mind Today"	30	13
1994	"Faster Hooves"	23	Flik Y'Self Off Y'Self
1994	"Spanish Goat Dancer"	14	Flik Y'Self Off Y'Self
1994	"Chalkface"	—	Flik Y'Self Off Y'Self
1996	"Cornbag"	—	Double Your Strength, Improve Your Health, & Lengthen Your Life
1997	"A Crying Shame"	—	Double Your Strength, Improve Your Health, & Lengthen Your Life
1997	"Hootenanny"	—	Double Your Strength, Improve Your Health, & Lengthen Your Life
1997	"Keith"	—	Double Your Strength, Improve Your Health, & Lengthen Your Life
1997	"Beatnik"	—	God Save The Clean
1998	"I'm on Fire"	—	Non-album single
1998	"Comfortably Shagged"	—	Are You Gonna Kiss It or Shoot It?
1998	"Wet Rubber"	27	Are You Gonna Kiss It or Shoot It?
1999	"Juicy Lucy"	30	Are You Gonna Kiss It or Shoot It?
1999	"Good Advice"	—	Are You Gonna Kiss It or Shoot It?
1999	"Hot Sexy Lusty"	—	Are You Gonna Kiss It or Shoot It?
1999	"Maharahja"	—	Are You Gonna Kiss It or Shoot It?
2010	"Swagger of Thieves"	—	Blood Will Out
2011	"Glory Glory (Hallelujah)"	—	Blood Will Out
"—" denotes a recording that did not chart or was not released in that territory.

=== Featured appearances ===
The group has appeared on many compilations and soundtracks in New Zealand. The following is a list of these albums that have featured tracks by Head Like a Hole.

- (1992) - Freak the Sheep Vol. 2 (Flying Nun Records) - "Fat Like a Hole".
- (1997) - God Save The Clean (Flying Nun Records) - "Beatnik" (The Clean cover).
- (1998) - Ice TV (Universal Music) - "A Crying Shame".
- (1999) - Best of Wildside (Wildside) - "Wet Rubber", "I'm On Fire", "Faster Hooves" and "Fish Across Face".
- (1999) - IceTV Good (Universal Music) - "Maharajah".
- (1999) - World Famous In New Zealand (Epic Music) - "Comfortably Shagged".
- (2000) - Savage Honeymoon (Mana Music Productions) - "Chevrolet".
- (2000) - Stickmen (Universal Music) - "Devil Went Down to Georgia" and "Comfortably Shagged".

== Filmography ==
Swagger of Thieves is a documentary released in August 2017 in time for the New Zealand International Film Festival. The film follows Nigel "Booga" Beazley and Nigel Regan, as they go on in their daily life, family and band events.
