= Cuba Street rainbow crossing =

Pedestrian crossing in New Zealand

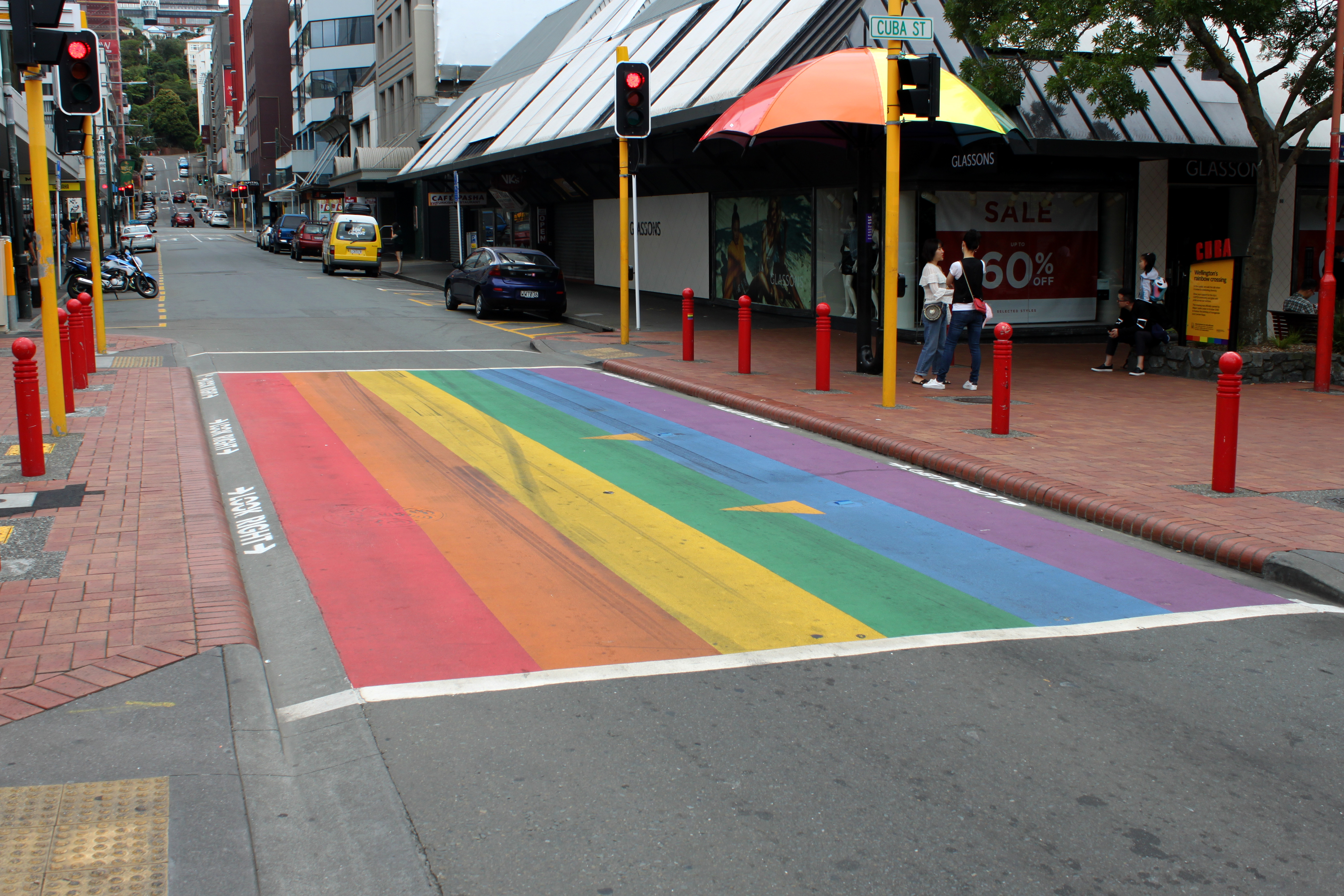
Wellington rainbow crossing

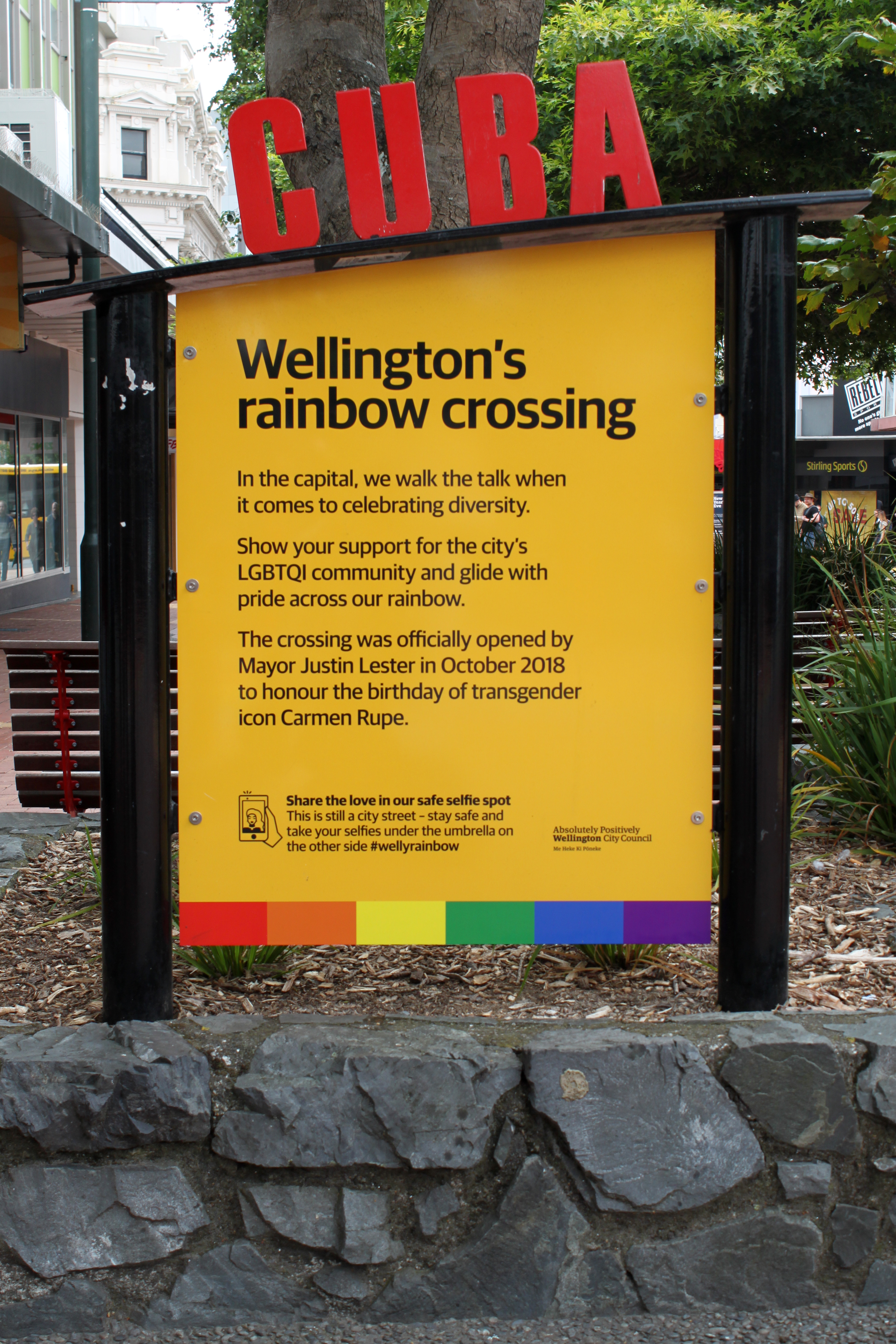
Information panel

The Cuba Street rainbow crossing is New Zealand's second rainbow pedestrian crossing – the first being made in Queenstown in June 2018. The Wellington crossing was installed by Wellington City Council "to show our support for the city's LGBTQI community." It is located at the intersection of Cuba Mall and Dixon Street.

== History ==
Mayor of Wellington Justin Lester participated in painting the crossing, before launching it a few days later on 10 October 2018. The launch date was to coincide with the birthday of the late Carmen Rupe. Within weeks the crossing was defaced with tyre skid marks. The crossing is often damaged by skid marks. In 2022, it was repainted at a cost of NZ$17,500.

Prior to its installation, the NZ Transport Agency opposed the crossing. It found that it breached Land Transport Rules, writing "there is a high risk of confusion and a dazzling and distracting effect." The New Zealand Police also raised safety concerns, writing that the crossing posed "risks of death and serious injury for road users – pedestrians in particular." Later, Justin Lester told media "I'm glad that we didn't have to get the police involved, I'm glad that I wasn't arrested out there painting the rainbow crossing."

The City Council said it was important to note that the crossing was not an official zebra crossing – "It is an art installation placed on the street between two formal signal controlled crossing points which have not been changed." In 2025, the crossing was challenged in the High Court of New Zealand by a citizen's group who argued that it was a safety risk that distracted drivers and violated an amended Land Transport Rule. The court ruled that the crossing was legal under the Land Transport Rule at the time of installation and any subsequent amendments were not retrospective.

== See also ==
- Rainbow crossing
- LGBTQ people in New Zealand
- Te Aro red light district
