= 13 (HLAH album) =

Studio album by Head Like a Hole
- Released: July 1992
- Recorded: Writhe Studio, Wellington, New Zealand
- Genre: Alternative metal, funk metal, crossover thrash
- Label: Wildside Records
- Producer: Head Like a Hole, Brent McLaughlin

Head Like a Hole chronology
13 (1992)	Flik Y'Self Off Y'Self (1994)

13 is the debut studio album by New Zealand rock band Head Like a Hole. The album peaked at #17 on the New Zealand albums chart.

== Track listing ==
1. "Hole"
2. "Life's A Joke"
3. "Never Mind Today"
4. "Afro Surprise"
5. "Wrapped To Death"
6. "Fish Across Face"
7. "Fat Little Man"
8. "Penut"
9. "Big Mouth"
10. "Narcotics, Noise & Nakedness"
11. "Ritual Groovemeister"
12. "12"
