= Locky Dock =

Bicycle locking and charging stations

Locky Docks at Dixon Street, Wellington

Locky Docks are a type of bicycle and e-scooter locking and charging stations in New Zealand. They are manufactured in Estonia and imported by the New Zealand company Big Street Bikers. The stations are free to use, but users must bring their own charging adapters. Revenue comes from advertising. They were first launched in 2020, in Christchurch.

Locky Docks at Paraparaumu railway station

== Locking stations ==
Locky Docks are manufactured in Estonia and imported by the New Zealand company Big Street Bikers. The lockers are activated and de-activated using an app, or a Locky Dock card, or most RFID cards. The stations have chargers; Mercury Energy provides the electricity for free. Users must bring their own adapters. Locky Docks support both bicycles and scooters. The stations are free to use (including both locking and charging), with revenue coming from advertisements. Locky Docks are made of galvanised steel. For security, CCTV cameras operate at the stations.

== History ==
Locky Docks were first demonstrated in 2018 at an event in Auckland. The first station was installed in Christchurch in May 2020 in Montreal Street outside the Arts Centre. As part of the initial rollout in Christchurch, ten sets of Locky Docks were installed. with $50,000 in funding from the Christchurch City Council. That year it was suggested that a modified version of Locky Docks be used in Wellington to store rideshare e-scooters without locking them, so they would not clutter the city's footpaths. Auckland's first Locky Docks were installed in 2021 and Wellington's first were installed in 2021. In 2023 Big Street Bikers partnered with the outdoor advertising company oOh!media to install more Locky Docks.

By 2025 Locky Docks had been used a total of 100,000 times. In May 2026 there were 95 Locky Dock stations nationwide. The company reported a 36% increase in Locky Docks during the 2026 Iran war fuel crisis. In 2026 Locky Docks were installed for the Great Taste Trail in the Tasman District. In 2026 Locky Docks were installed in Napier and Hastings.

== See also ==
- Cycling in New Zealand
