= Rip It Up (New Zealand) =

New Zealand music magazine

- Categories: Music magazine
- Frequency: Bi-monthly
- Founded: 1977
- First issue: June 1977
- Final issue: 2015
- Country: New Zealand
- Based in: Auckland
- Language: English
- ISSN: 0114-0876

Rip It Up was a bi-monthly New Zealand music magazine that was published from 1977 to 2015.

== History and profile ==
Started in June 1977 as a free monthly giveaway, it grew rapidly, with its monthly print run reaching 30,000 copies by the mid-1980s. The new magazine arrived at an opportune moment, with the musical revolutions of punk rock and new wave arriving in New Zealand in the first few years of its existence - two genres which the new magazine was to champion, alongside local music trends such as the Dunedin sound. For many years it was unequalled as a New Zealand source of information on rock music. The magazine's back-catalogue also provides an unrivalled reference for information about the history of New Zealand's rock music.

The brainchild of Murray Cammick and Alistair Dougal, Rip It Up was circulated free via record shops for fourteen years as a music rag produced on a meagre budget. In 1991 the physical quality of the publication improved, making the transition from newsprint to a gloss medium, a direct result of the NZ$2 charge.

== Editors ==
Murray Cammick was the first editor of the magazine and ran it virtually single-handedly for several years. Other editors have included David Long, now a sports journalist at Fairfax Media, Scott Kara, who later worked for the New Zealand Herald, Martyn Bradbury (radio and television host), who left Rip it Up in 2005, and Phil Bell (AKA DJ Sir-Vere), who left in August 2011 to become the programme director for popular urban radio station Mai FM.

Rip It Up ceased publication in 2015. The archives and the name are owned by Simon Grigg.

In 2019, digitized issues of Rip It Up from 1977 to 1985 were made available through the National Library of New Zealand's Papers Past website. Issues from 1986 to 1998 were added to Papers Past in 2023.
