= Manners Street =

Street in Wellington, New Zealand

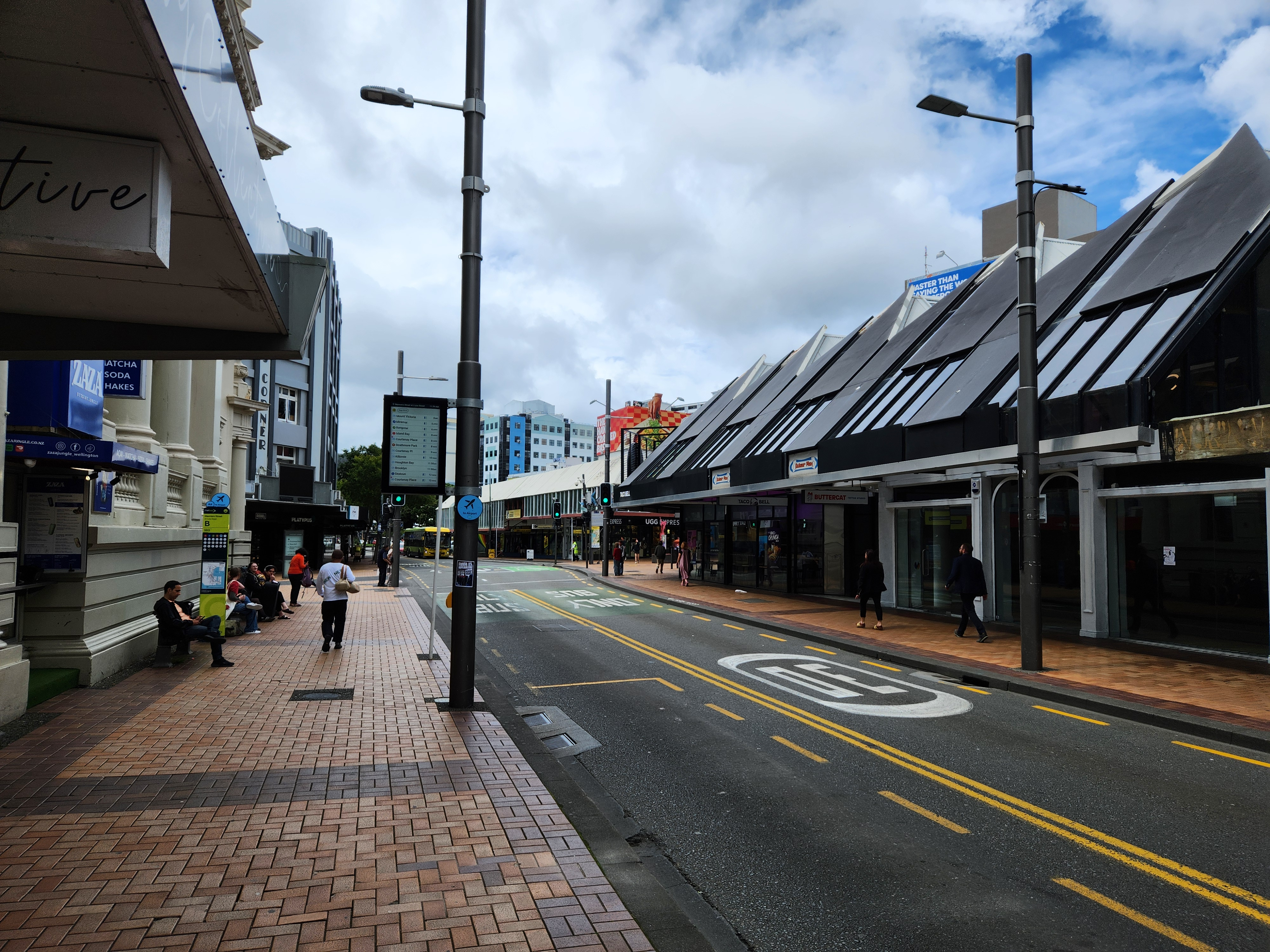
- Manners Street in January 2026
- Interactive map of Manners Street
- Location: Te Aro, Wellington, New Zealand
- Coordinates: 41.29122°S 174.77688°E
- East end: Taranaki Street / Courtenay Place
- West end: Willis Street / Boulcott Street

Manners Street is a street in the Wellington, New Zealand, suburb of Te Aro. It runs from the intersection of Courtenay Place and Taranaki Street in the east to the intersection with Willis Street and Boulcott Street in the west. Cuba Street crosses Manners Street. Lambton Quay, Willis Street, Manners Street and Courtenay Place form what is known locally as the 'Golden Mile', which is where most of the city's retail and commercial activities are located.

== Toponymy ==
What Manners Street was named after is not known. There have been suggestions that it was named after Charles Manners-Sutton, 1st Viscount Canterbury, who was a speaker of the British House of Commons. Another possibility is Frederick Tollemache, the son of Sir William Manners.

== History ==
=== 19th and early 20th centuries ===
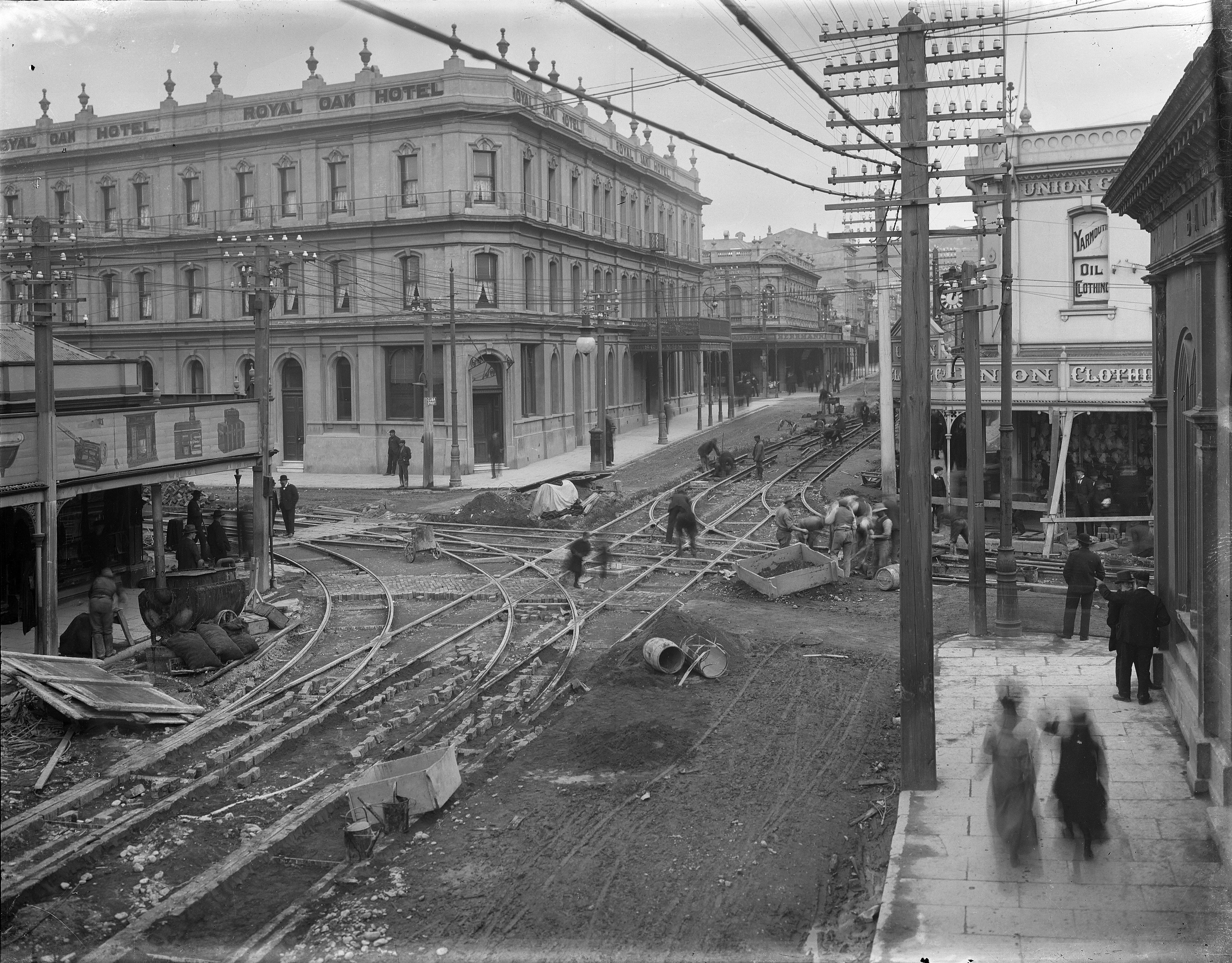
Men working on tram lines at the corner of Manners and Cuba Streets, 1903

In the 1850s Manners Street was much closer to the waterfront than it is now because of a lack of land reclamation at this point in time—Wakefield Street and Jervois Quay did not yet exist. An 1858 image of the street shows that at that point the street was muddy and unfriendly to pedestrians. Travel through the street was often done on foot or by horse. Cattle, chickens and sheep were a common sight on the road.

A tram line was installed in Manners Street in 1878, the same year that the Wellington tramway system opened. In December that year steam trams at Manners Street were reported to run at speeds of approximately 4 miles per hour (6.4 km/h).

After one of the 1942 Wairarapa earthquakes, Manners Street was closed off to pedestrians for several days due to concerns about hazardous buildings.

=== Battle of Manners Street ===
On 3 April 1943, during the Second World War, a riot between American and New Zealand servicemen erupted at the Allied Service's Club in Manners Street. The battle may have started after some southern American servicemen prohibited Māori servicemen from drinking at the club. Fighting on the street ensued, and spread elsewhere, such as to the A.N.A club in Willis Street and in Cuba Street. Two Americans were rumoured to have been killed in the riot, and numerous others were injured. Over 1,000 servicemen from both countries fought in the battle, along with a few hundred civilians. The riot was not reported on by local newspapers at the time due to wartime censorship, which may have contributed to the battle becoming mythologised. Details surrounding the event, which is notorious in New Zealand, are not well known.

=== Manners Mall ===
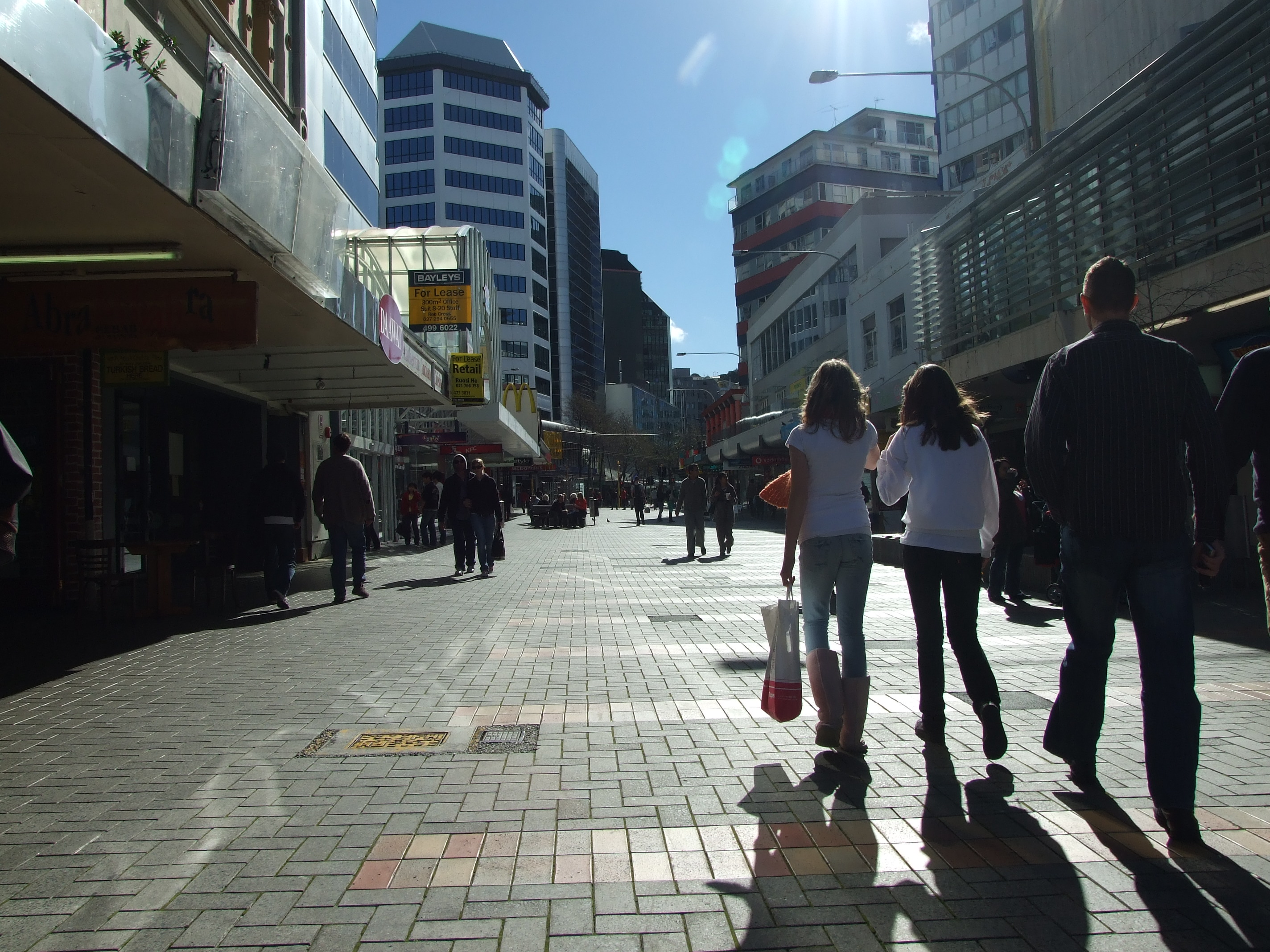
Manners Mall in 2007

The section of Manners Street between Cuba Street and Victoria Street was pedestrianised in 1979 and was known as Manners Mall. A fountain was placed in the area at some point between 1979 and 1989. It had an orange sculpture which was removed in 1997 after being vandalised and the rest of the fountain was removed in 2001. With the intention of increasing bus reliability and reducing bus travel times, in 2010 a bus-only roadway was opened through what had been Manners Mall, after five months of construction. This move, which was controversial, ended the pedestrian-only nature of the area. In 2012 ViaStrada reported a decrease in travel times.

=== 21st century ===
In 2012, Wellington city councillor Leonie Gill proposed placing nautical-style rope barriers across the road to discourage jaywalking, as at that time there had been eight known cases of pedestrians colliding with buses since the bus route was introduced.

In March 2025 rainbow colours were painted onto the shelter of bus stop 5515 to celebrate Pride Month, which is held in March in Wellington.

== Notable buildings ==
=== Wellington Opera House ===
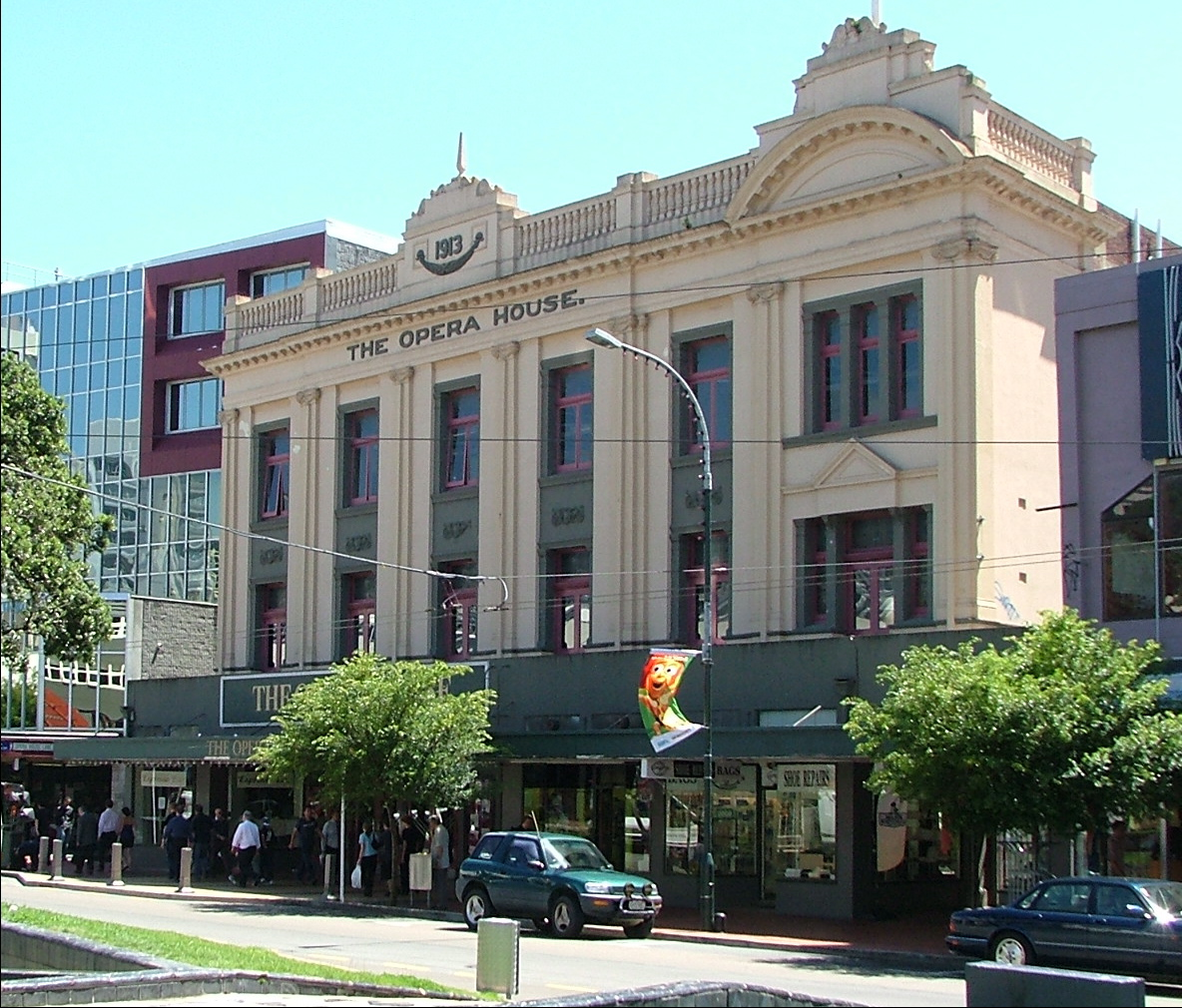
The Wellington Opera House in 2008

The Wellington Opera House is located at 109-117 Manners Street and has approximately 16,500 square metres (178,000 sq ft) of floor space. It was opened in 1914 after work began on designing and constructing it in 1911. Since 1985 the building has been listed by Heritage New Zealand as a category 1 historic place.

=== Bank of New Zealand Te Aro branch building ===
The Bank of New Zealand Te Aro branch building is a historic building on the corner of Manners and Cuba Street, Wellington, New Zealand.

The building, designed by William Turnbull (son of Thomas Turnbull), is one of Wellington's earliest reinforced concrete and steel structures. It features Corinthian columns and ornate projecting cornices. It was refurbished in the early 1980s.

The building, classified as a Category 1 Historic Place (places of "special or outstanding historical or cultural heritage significance or value") by Heritage New Zealand, housed a Burger King restaurant until April 2020.

=== James Smith's building ===
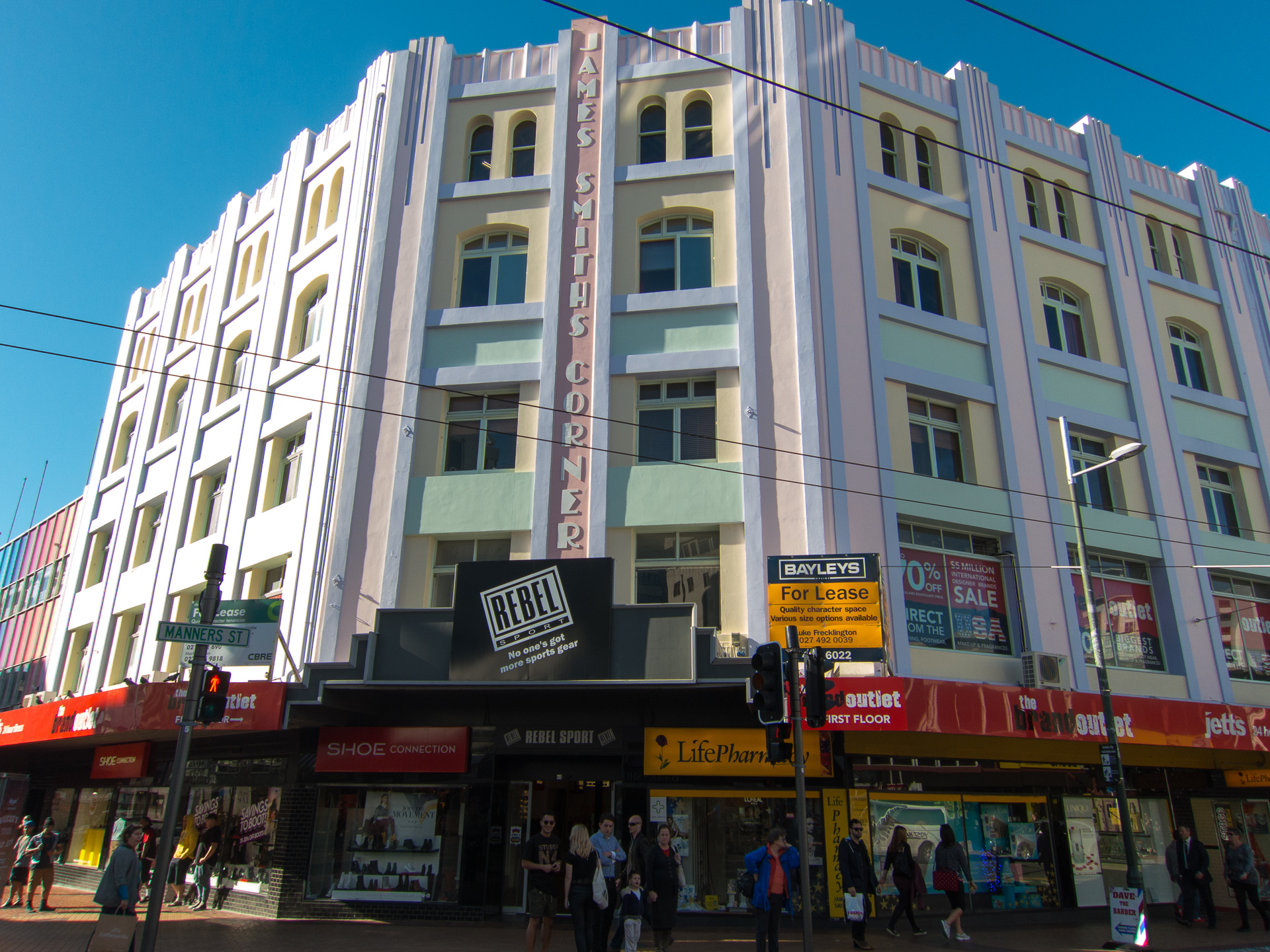
The James Smith building in 2014

The building of the former James Smith Ltd department store is located on the corner of Manners and Cuba Streets. It was built in 1907 with an Edwardian façade for George Winder, an ironmongery importer. The building has had several redesigns over the years, such as a remodelling of the façade in 1932 which changed the style to Art Deco. In 1934 the building was extended which required the demolition of its eastern corner. The building was used by James Smith Ltd as a department store until 1993. As of 2022 the lower floors of the building are used as retail space and a gym, and the upper floors are used as office space. Since 1991 the building has been listed by Heritage New Zealand as a category 2 historic place.

=== Methodist Church ===
After a church at Manners Street was destroyed by the 1848 Marlborough earthquake, a Methodist church and parsonage was built at the same location in 1850. After two decades the building was replaced due to an increase in the size of the congregation. The church and several buildings neighbouring it were destroyed by the Great Fire of 1879. A replacement church was built at 75 Taranaki Street.

== Perrett's Corner ==
The corner of Manners and Willis Streets is known by many as Perrett's Corner. By 1878 it was the location of a surgery. After about three decades the building was bought by the brothers Claude and Edwin Perrett, from France, who used it to run a chemist shop and a mail order business. This business was disestablished in 1964 and in 1971 the building was demolished. In 2012 there was a café in the area named Perrett's Corner.

== Te Aro Park ==
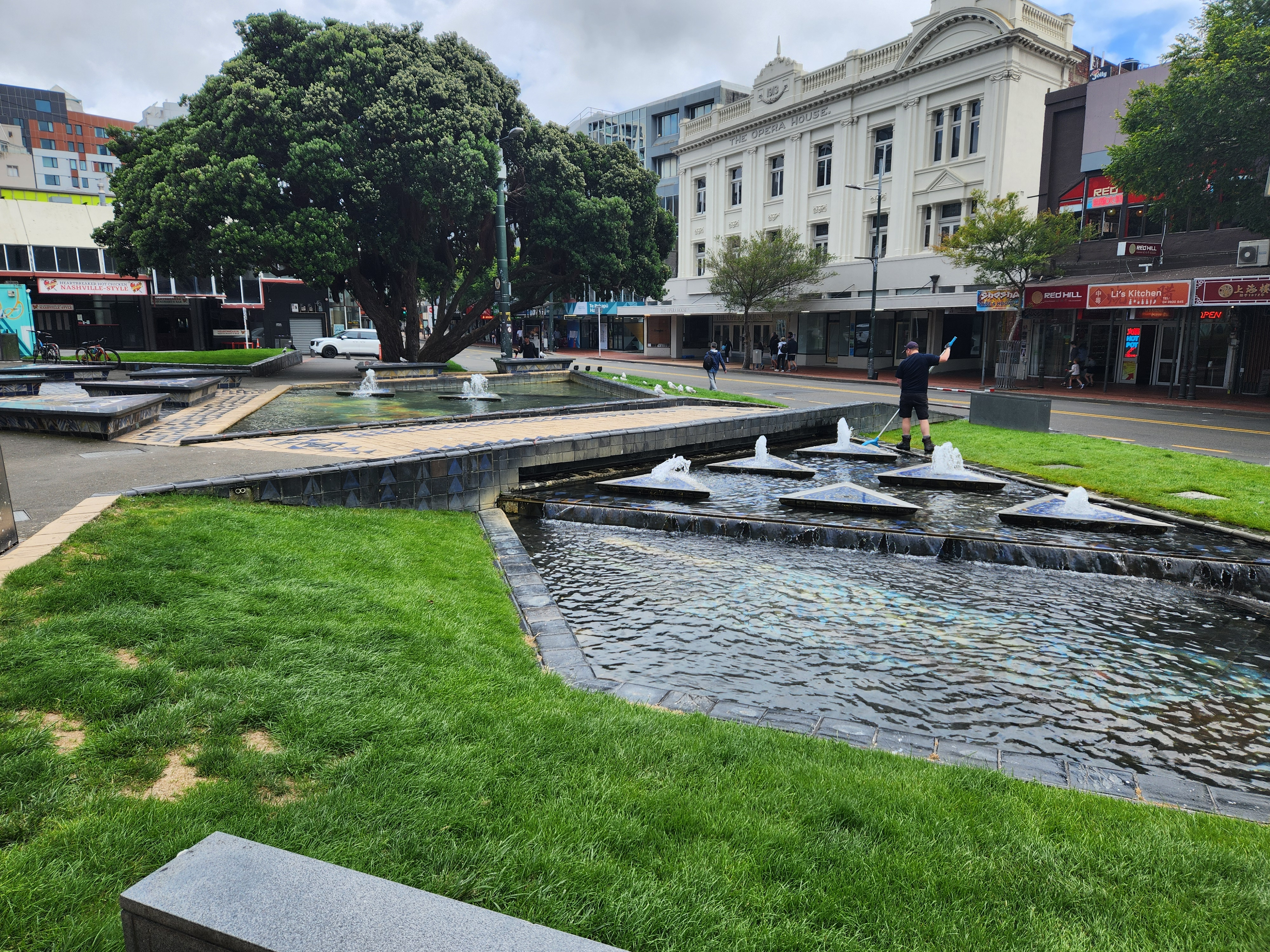
Te Aro Park in 2026

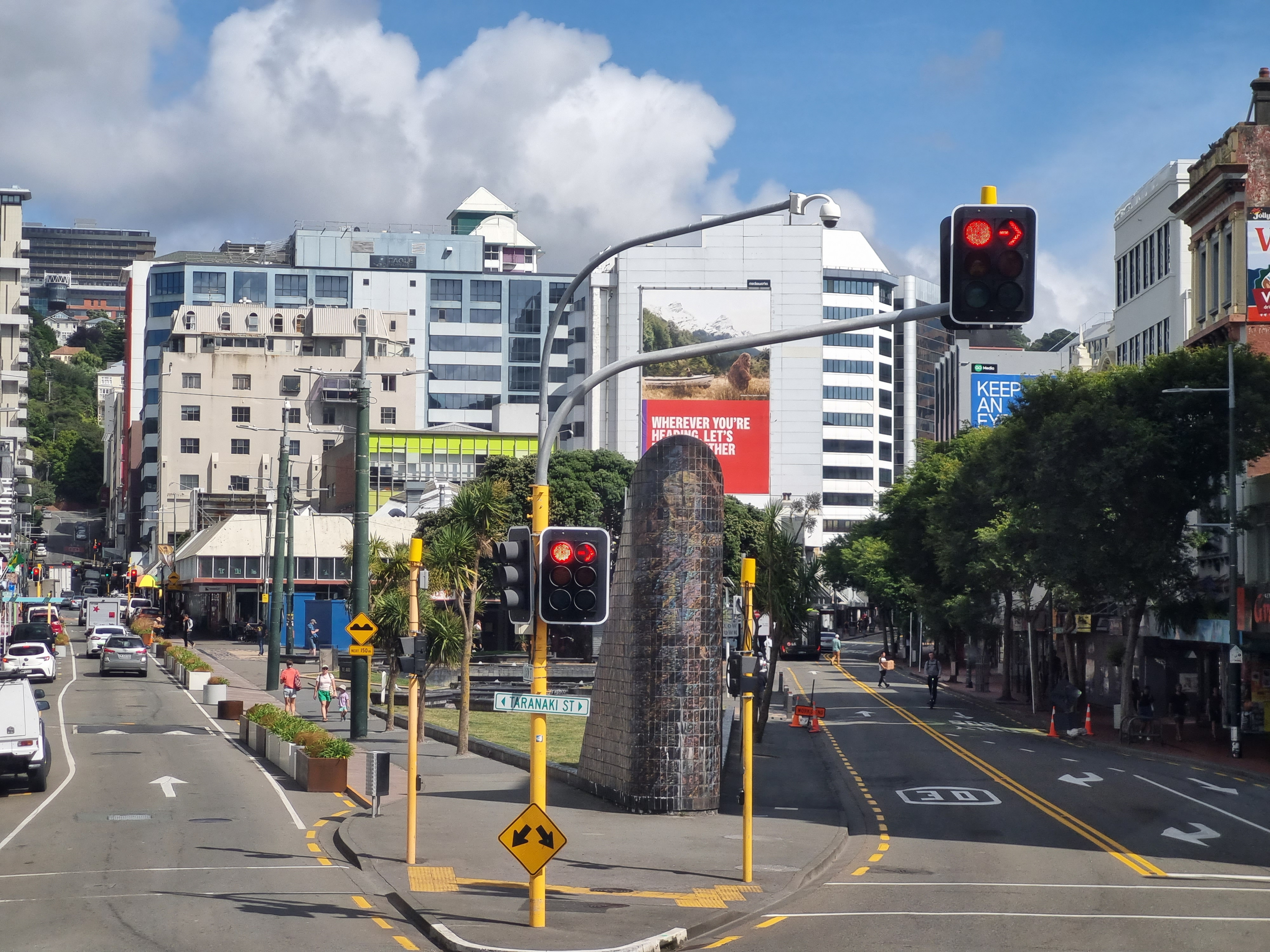
The prow at Te Aro Park, between Dixon Street (left) and Manners Street (right)

Te Aro Park (formerly commonly known as Pigeon Park) is a small public park situated on a triangular piece of land between Manners Street and Dixon Street. Te Aro Pā was close to this location but by the 1880s very few Māori remained at the site. The Council bought the land in the 1870s, and it became known as Market Reserve and then Manners Street Reserve. In 1910 buildings on the site were demolished and a park created, with public toilets at the western end. An electrically operated clock was installed at the eastern end of the park in 1927 by the Tramways Department, but has since been moved further along to a pedestrian area in Courtenay Place. In 1939 a memorial and drinking fountain were installed by Taranaki Street Wesleyan Church to commemorate the centenary of Wesleyan missionaries landing in Wellington and preaching to Māori at Te Aro Pā. The memorial was retained in the redeveloped park.

In 1988 Wellington City Council approved a design by Shona Rapira Davies for redevelopment of the park as a symbolic waka (canoe). The project, named Te Waimapihi, ended up costing over $800,000, more than three times the amount agreed with Davies, and was finished a year later than agreed. A documentary was made about Davies' work on the park and the controversy that surrounded the project. The redeveloped park was opened in May 1992. A tiled upright structure forms the prow of the canoe, and trees planted at intervals along the sides represent paddlers. Paving at the park is formed from 30,000 clay tiles handmade by Davies and imprinted with plants and names. Warning signs had to be installed when it was discovered that the tiles become extremely slippery when wet. Triangular shapes throughout the park evoke Māori weaving, and flowing water in the park's pools represents cleansing and renewal. A piece of pounamu (greenstone) was buried under the prow at the opening ceremony.

From around 2018 anti-social behaviour at the park increased, and in August 2020 a police report on the area was submitted to Wellington City Council for review. The report identified problems including gang members and vulnerable people in nearby emergency housing, easy availability of alcohol from numerous outlets near the park and problems in and around the public toilets at the park. The police report led to publication by the Council of Te Aro Park – Assessing Harm in September 2020. Proposed changes to the park included increased camera surveillance and better sightlines, better lighting, increased patrols by police and Māori wardens and possible removal of the toilet block. The report also identified a need to increase awareness of and mana of the artwork formed by the park's design and tiles. In early 2021 the City Council, in partnership with police and other organisations, launched 'The Pōneke Promise', an initiative to make people feel safer in the inner city. As part of this initiative, in 2022 the City Council removed car parks along one side of Te Aro Park and replaced them with a $600,000 timber boardwalk and planter boxes. The stated aim was to increase visibility around the park, make it look nicer, slow traffic and create more pedestrian space. The changes to the park did not address the issue of problems with people loitering in the park. The Council demolished the public toilets in the park in November 2022, saying this would lead to increased vibrancy in the area. The Council announced that permanent replacement facilities would not be built for over a year, probably in 2024, but that it intended to place some temporary toilets in a nearby street within a few months.
