= Hallelujah Picassos =

Band from Auckland, New Zealand

- Origin: Auckland, New Zealand
- Genres: reggae, rap, ska, thrash, jazz, pop
- Label: Wildside Records
- Members: Roland Rorschach; Peter McLennan; Darryn Harkness; Drew McCormack
- Past members: Tony de Raad; Patrick Brunton; Mat Rew; Gavin Downie; Shamus Obrien; Johnnie Pain; Bobbylon
- Website: picassocore.blogspot.co.nz

Hallelujah Picassos were/are a reggae, rap, ska, thrash, jazz, pop crossover band from Auckland, New Zealand. They started life in 1988 as a garage punk band The Rattlesnakes, changing their name to Hallelujah Picassos in 1989. They were released on Pagan Records for their first official single No More, following several self-released cassettes, then with the Wildside label for subsequent releases.

New Zealand publication Rip It Up described their music as a mix and match: "The Picassos mix and match musical styles to keep themselves, as much as their audience, interested. A reggae bassline appears in a thrash number, which breaks to a pop jazz ditty before thrashing back into something with a hardcore bassline which is finished off with a reggae outro." (Rip It Up, May 1992)

Hallelujah Picassos are particularly notable for their association with other bands from Supergroove, Urban Disturbance, Love's Ugly Children, Second Child, musician Greg Johnson and The Managers, to Dub Asylum and new punk bands including City Newton Bombers, and also for their association with cult New Zealand figures such as Martin Emond who provided artwork for several of their releases. In 2002 New Zealand Musician called Hallelujah Picassos "one of this country's seminal reggae/rock fusion outfits."

In 1991 they were the support act for Screamin' Jay Hawkins on his two NZ shows. They also played support for Soundgarden, Faith No More, the Violent Femmes, Primus, Beastie Boys, Ice T and Body Count, Asian Dub Foundation, African Head Charge and more. They played at the 1995 Big Day Out, after being overlooked for a slot for the first Big Day Out in NZ the previous year.

In early 1994 they added a fifth member, Gavin Downie, formerly of Colony. After they toured in support of "The Gospel of the DNA Demon" EP in late 1995, Johnnie Pain and Peter McLennan left the band, reportedly for 'spiritual reasons'. After recruiting new members, the band officially broke up in 1996 and occasionally reunited to play live gigs, such as Radio 95BFM's 30th Birthday, in 1999.

Although they had limited commercial success – Rewind was "the only single that ever made a dent in the charts" – the band retains a cult status in the New Zealand music scene among fans who recall their incendiary live shows. They were featured in the book Kiwi Rock, published in 1996.

The band reunited to play live shows in 2013, following the remaster/reissue of their back catalogue on the compilation Rewind The Hateman (2011) and Picasso Core Jukebox (2012), featuring their collected cover versions. The band added Darryn Harkness on bass, with John Pain moving to keyboards. They released some new recordings on a four-song digital EP, Bullet That Breaks The Key, in September 2014 Their drummer Bobbylon died on May 25, 2018.

== Members ==
- Roland Rorschach
- Peter McLennan
- Darryn Harkness
- Drew McCormack

Former members include Bobbylon, Johnnie Pain, Gavin Downie, Tony de Raad, Patrick Brunton, Matt Rew.

== Discography ==
=== Albums ===
- Hateman in Love (1992)
- Drinking With Judas (1993)
- Rewind the Hateman (2011)
- Picasso Core Jukebox (2012)
- Voices of Exhuberant Hellhounds (2019)

=== Singles and EPs ===
- Taxi Driver (cassette mini album 1989)
- Peanut Butter (cassette EP 1991)
- "No More" (1991)
- "Lovers +" (1992)
- "U + I" (1993)
- "Rewind" (1994) Peaked number 50 on NZ Chart for one week
- Gospel of the DNA Demon (EP) (1995)
- "Salvadore (Miles Away From You)" digital single (2014)
- Bullet That Breaks The Key digital EP (2014)
- "Voices of One" / "Black Spade Picasso Core" 7" single (2018)
- "Glorious Hallelujah (a Hymn for a Secular Congregation)" digital single (2022)
- "Brothers and Sisters (There’s more than blood that binds us)" digital single (2022)
- "Jelly Inna Jar" digital single (2023)
- "Tax The Rich" digital single (2023)
- "Kiss The Smiling Electric Buddha" digital single (2024)
- "Bring The Joy" digital single (2024)
