= Wildside Records =

Independent New Zealand record label

Wildside Records was an independent New Zealand record label of the 1990s and early 2000s, owned and run by former Rip It Up magazine editor, Murray Cammick. Its signings included Shihad, Head Like a Hole, Slim, Pumpkinhead, Hallelujah Picassos, Bailterspace, Breathe, Rumblefish and Dead Flowers.

== See also ==
- Best of Wildside, a compilation album
- Lists of record labels
