= Martin Wilson (environmentalist) =

New Zealand environmentalist (1959–2022)

Martin James Wilson (1 August 1959 – 11 August 2022) was an environmentalist and community leader from Wellington, New Zealand. In the 1980s he initiated and ran several Cuba Street Carnivals, started the Birdman competitions on the Wellington waterfront and initiated festivals and craft markets though several suburbs over decades. He raised awareness of food waste via setting up and running guerrilla gardening composting in his local suburb of Aro Valley.

== Early years ==
Wilson's parents were Diana Wilson and architect Derek Wilson. His father published two environmental and anti-nuclear books. Wilson was the youngest of three boys, and was born in Wellington, New Zealand. He went to high school at the liberal Onslow College then to study several disciplines from anthropology to politics, development studies to international relations, psychology to geography, environment studies to public policy, economics and commercial law at Victoria University.

He was part of the central city, Cuba Street and Aro Valley scene from the 1980s which led him to playing in bands and then creating and running the original Cuba Street Carnival

=== 1980s and '90s ===
The Upper Cuba Street Carnivals were antecedent to two more privately run Carnivals in the middle of Cuba Street in 1991 and 1993. Wilson ran another in 1995. The City Council funded them from 1998–2009 as a biennial event. Since 2015 Council have run the Cuba Dupa festival

With his company Capital Productions Ltd., Wilson created the craft market in civic square and several annual, community, village festivals in Karori, Newtown, Aro Valley, Khandallah, Kilbirnie and elsewhere.

Wilson ran multiple annual Birdman Festivals which included an event where competitors jump into the harbour often in elaborate costume. They were held on the Wellington waterfront.

=== 2000s ===
Wilson became an elected member of the Aro Valley Community Council and was well known for his determined and often challenging beliefs particularly around environmental matters. He wrote in the Valley's newsletter on local urban farming group Kai o Te Aro and composting. He created two community guerrilla gardening worm farms and composting systems. The first farm in 2018 was removed by the Wellington City Council and the second, the "Hotel de Worm" at the northern entrance to Holloway Road, was also threatened with removal, but following the intervention of Green councilor Iona Pannett the community composting worm farm was saved.

As an avid Ultimate Frisbee player and coach he introduced the sport into Wellington schools, coached and became president of the Victoria University Flying Disc Club which recently created a specific award for fairness and sports-person-ship in his name.

In 2013 Wilson stood, unsuccessfully, for council in the Onslow-Western Ward.

Wilson organised Birdman Festivals in 2015 and 2017.

== Music ==
Wilson played guitar in and managed several bands. He also ran raves in warehouses through the 1990s.

== Personal life ==
He had two sons with Patrice Diamantis and one daughter with Laila Faisal. Martin lived in the Aro Valley's Holloway Road where he and his public guerrilla gardening composting initiative were well known.

Wilson died in Wellington on 11 August 2022 of prostate cancer, aged 63.
