= Former National Bank of New Zealand Building =

Historic building on the corner of Cuba Street and Vivian Street, Wellington

National Bank of New Zealand Building
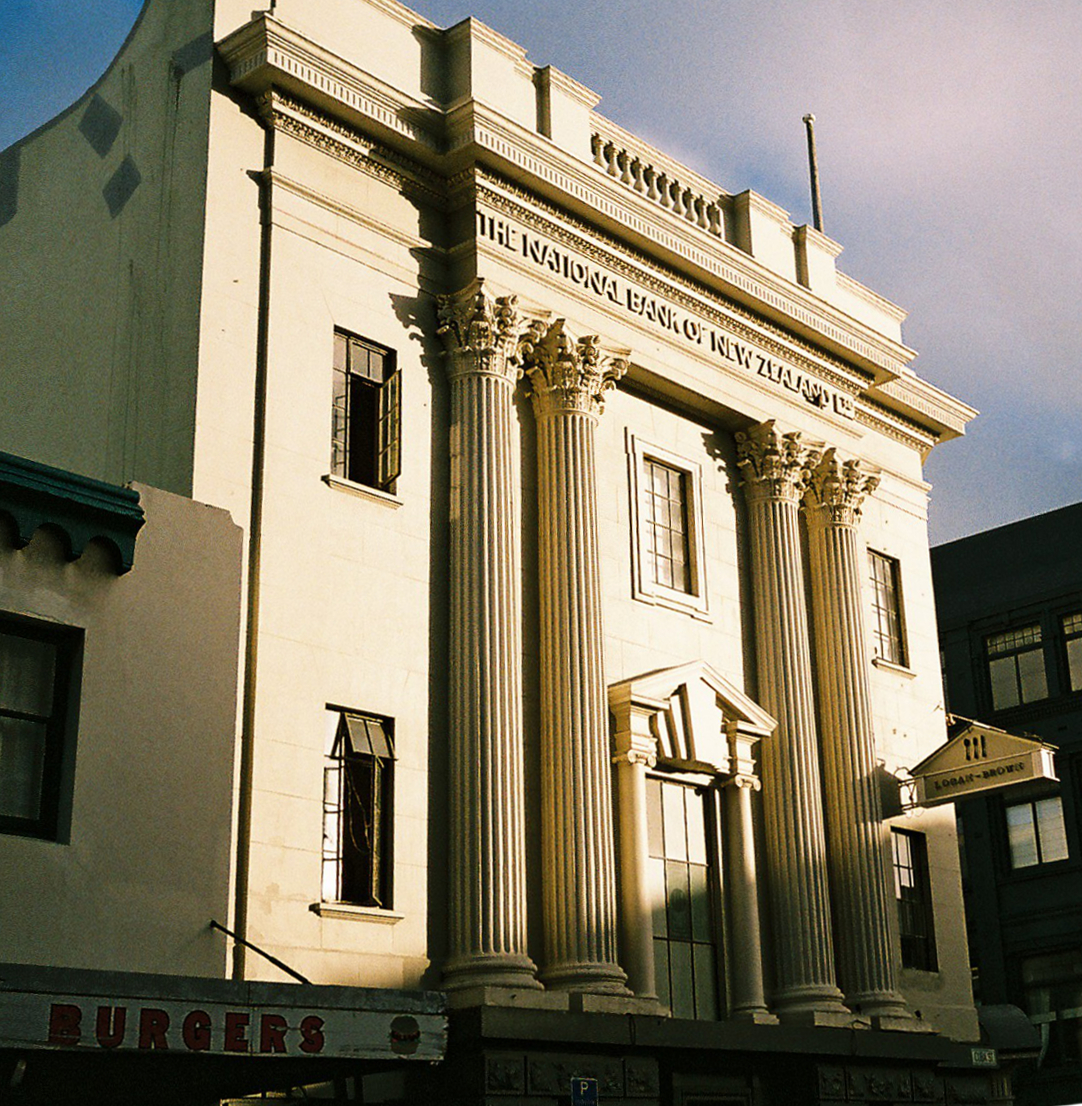
- Interactive map of the National Bank of New Zealand Building area

General information
- Location: 192–194 Cuba Street, Wellington, New Zealand
- Coordinates: 41.2948°S 174.7746°E
- Current tenants: Logan Brown Restaurant
- Completed: 1917–1923

Design and construction
- Architects: Plummer-Jones, Claude

Heritage New Zealand – Category 1
- Official name: National Bank Building, Te Aro, Branch Building
- Designated: 19 March 1986
- Reference no.: 3634

The National Bank of New Zealand Building is a historic building on the corner of Cuba Street and Vivian Street, Wellington, New Zealand. It is now occupied by Logan Brown Restaurant.

The building, designed by Claude Plummer-Jones, contains an exceptionally fine main banking space. Built by day labour, the structure is of concrete, faced externally with Malmesbury stone for the rusticated base with sandstone for the levels above. The building is Classical in style. The two storeys above the ground floor have attached Corinthian columns that extend through both storeys and are surmounted by an entablature and a balustraded parapet. Inside, the ground floor contains the (former) banking hall and some ancillary office space. Octagonal in shape, the paired Corinthian column theme of the exterior is repeated internally to form, with arches between each pair, an open arcade. Above, a 6-metre diameter glazed dome further enhances the quality of the space. The banking hall as a whole offers one of Wellington's finer interior architectural experiences.

The building is classified as a Category 1 Historic Place by Heritage New Zealand.
