= Bucket Fountain =

Kinetic sculpture in Wellington, New Zealand

Coordinates: 41.292258°S 174.776293°E

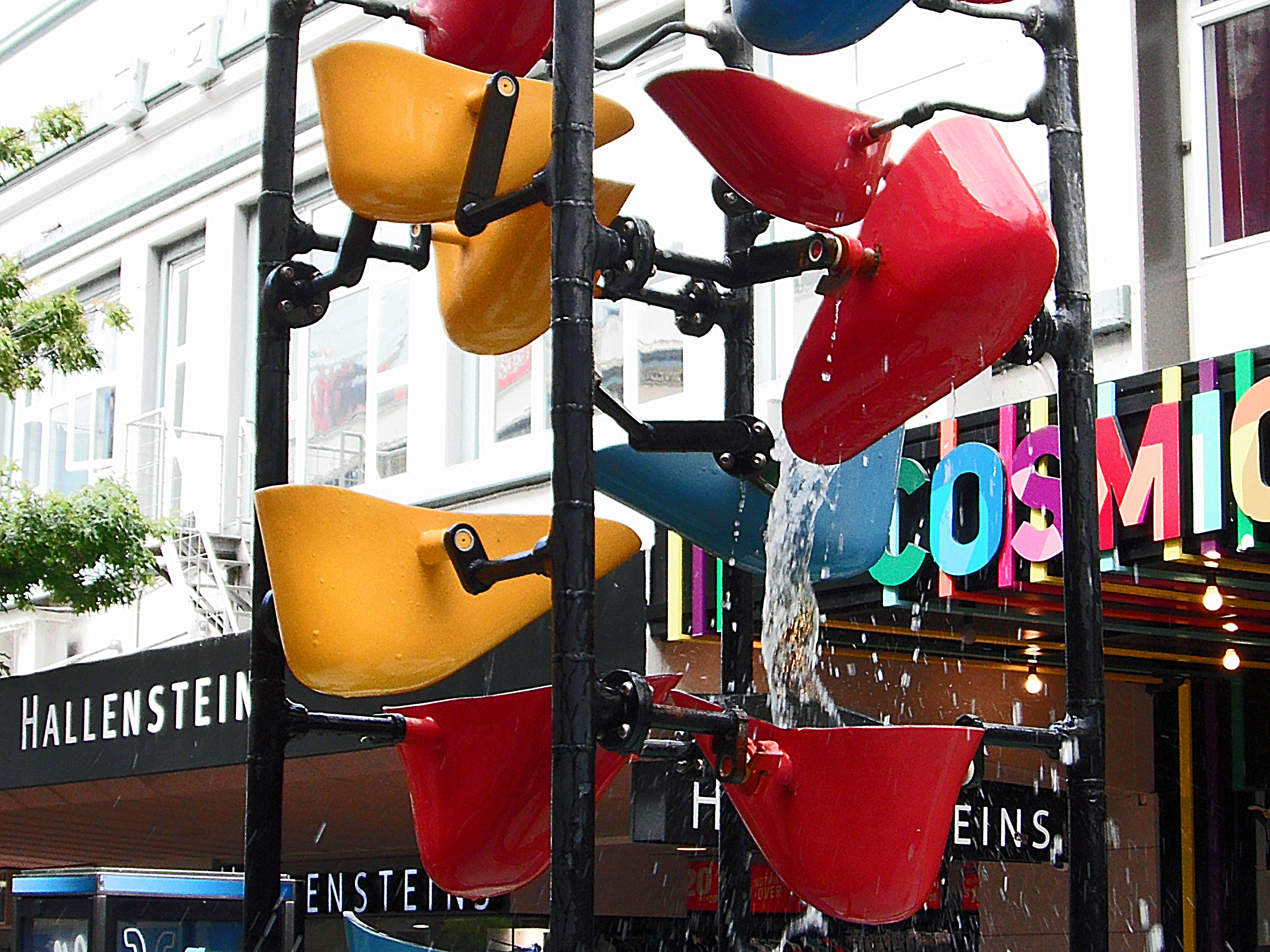
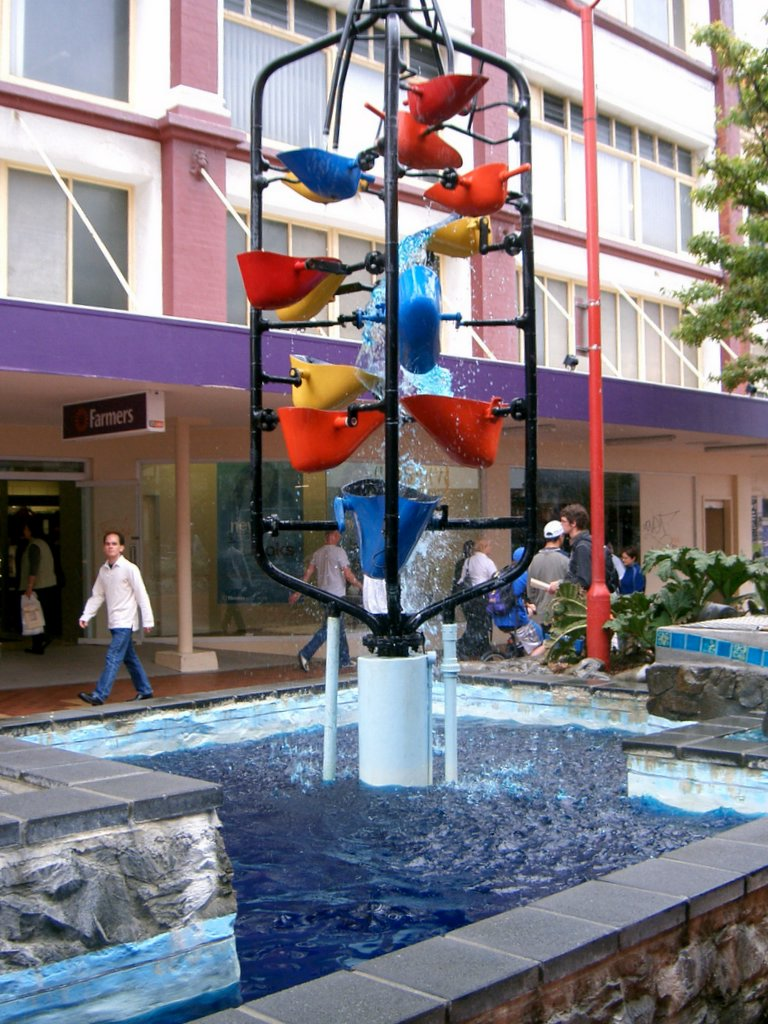
The Bucket Fountain in Wellington's Cuba Mall

The Bucket Fountain is an iconic kinetic sculpture in Wellington, the capital city of New Zealand. It is located in Cuba Mall, which is part of Cuba Street. It consists of a series of "buckets" that fill with water until they tip, spilling their load into the buckets and pool below. The fountain was designed by Graham Allardice of Burren and Keen and erected in 1969.

Much of the water does not reach the buckets below, but instead splashes onto pedestrians and onlookers. On windy days (common in Wellington) water is carried several metres from the fountain.

People sometimes add dishwashing detergent to the water, which spreads bubbles all over the mall.

== History ==
The sculpture, initially called the 'Water Mobile', was designed by Graham Allardice of Burran and Keen for the pedestrianisation of Cuba Street. Allardice was told to create something with "a water motif which could be illuminated at night for visual enjoyment”. The fountain is very similar to one designed by Richard Huws that was erected in Liverpool in 1967. The sculpture was constructed out of steel, aluminium, and fibreglass at a cost of $2000. It was controversial after its opening in 1969, with critics describing it as an "engineering joke" and "monstrosity", as well as being a target for vandalism.

In 1981 the fountain was described as being in a "sorry state of repair". It was fixed and repainted by the manager of Cuba Mall at the time. Wellington City Council upgraded the fountain in 2003, cleaning, sandblasting and repainting the buckets, as well as making them more likely to splash. Additionally, the colour of the buckets was modified at some stage; they were initially all yellow.

=== Incidents ===
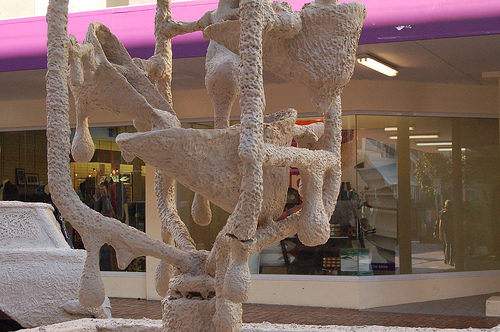
The fountain coated in mud-like substance, March 2006

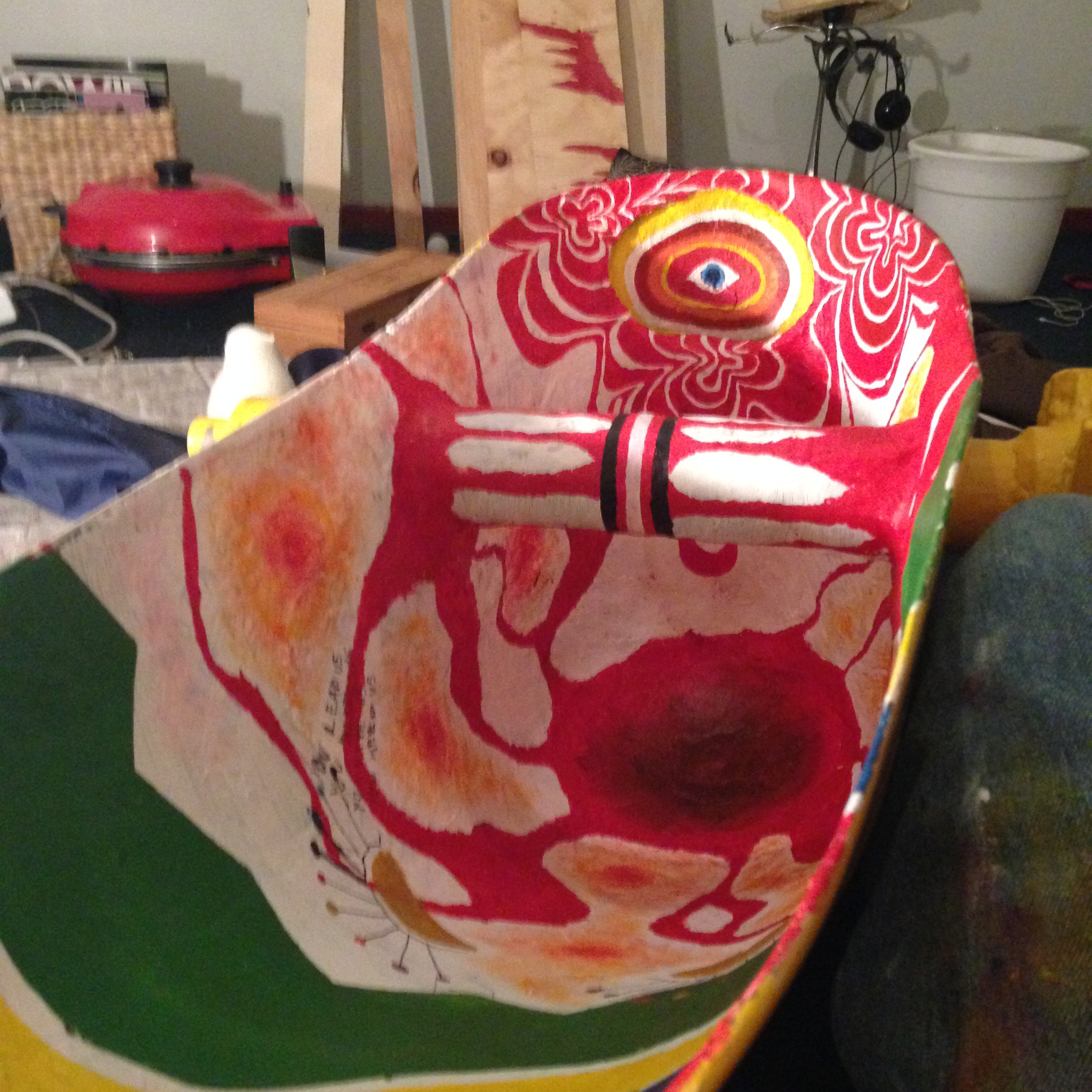
The lower yellow bucket with upgraded paint job, February 2016

Elijah Wood, who played Frodo in Peter Jackson's The Lord of the Rings films, climbed on and drunkenly urinated in the fountain while in New Zealand filming the movies. This was confirmed by the actor during an interview with Jay Leno.

In March 2006, the fountain was coated in a mud-like substance by New Zealand artist John Radford.

In January 2014 the bucket fountain was victim of a simulated oil spill with the water turned black. The protest was "to illustrate the threat which deep sea drilling poses to Wellington coasts, local businesses, the environment and the people."

In February 2016, one of the larger yellow buckets located near the bottom of the fountain was stolen in the night. After a plea by the Wellington City Council to have the bucket returned, the missing bucket was left in the pool at the base of the fountain. The returned bucket was found to have been painted with an intricate and psychedelic pattern. On 17 March, the bucket was reinstalled on the fountain. Wellington Mayor Celia Wade-Brown, when approached on the issue, said "I'm unequivocally blissful they brought it back unscathed and apparently enhanced, from what I've seen. We consider it an utterly appealing small paint job."

In October 2021 one of the larger buckets was reported stolen from the fountain. It was retrieved in December 2021 after a member of the public spotted a picture of the bucket on social media and reported it to the Wellington City Council. The thief had painted the bucket gold and drawn a dragon on it. By the time the bucket was found the Council was in the process of creating a replacement bucket which would cost $2000.

== In popular culture ==
The fountain appeared in the first episode of television show Wellington Paranormal, where it doubled as an inter-dimensional portal. It has also appeared in a music video by Bic Runga.
