= Cuba Street =

Street in Wellington, New Zealand

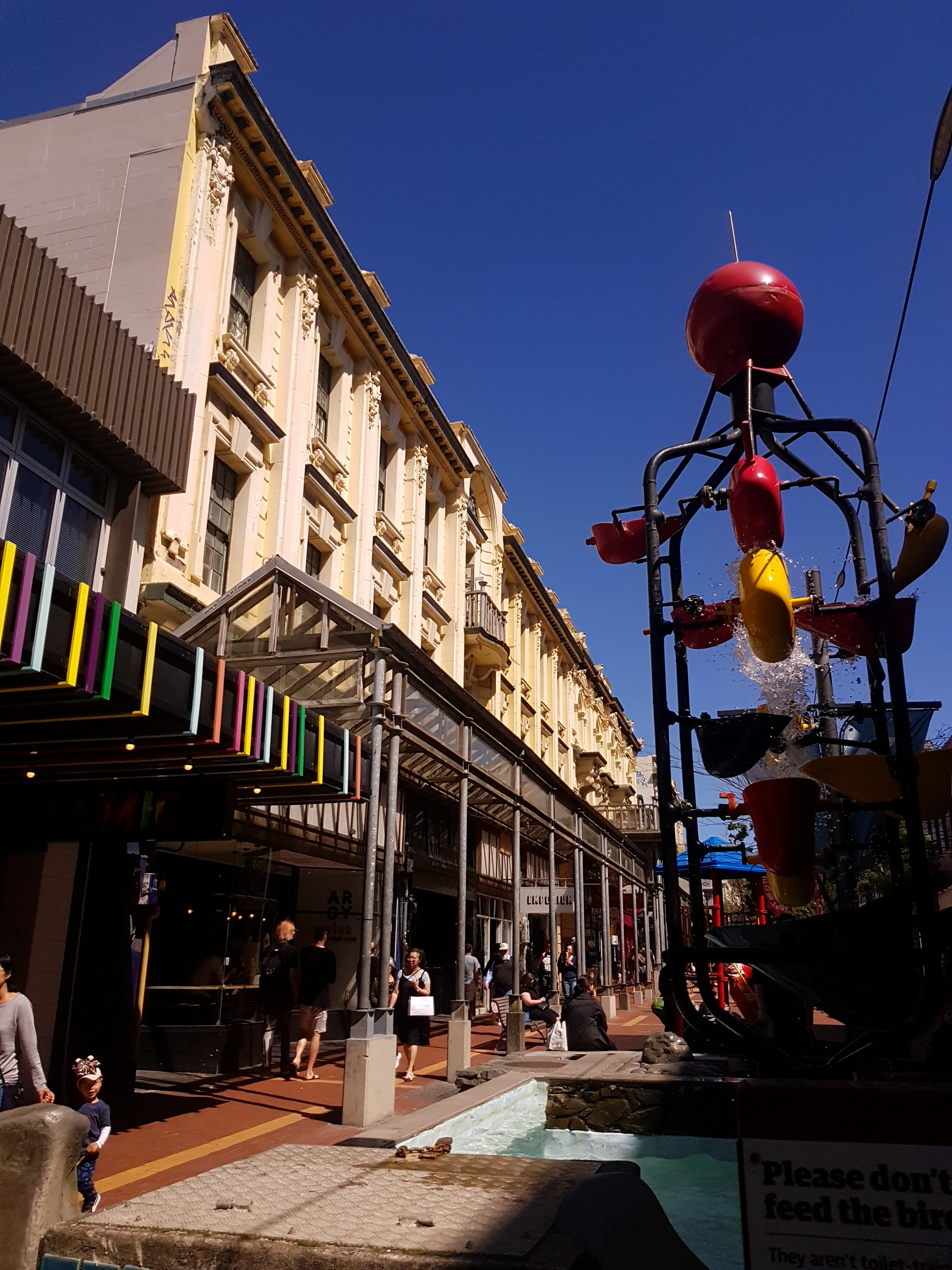
- Cuba Street and the Bucket Fountain, 2020
- Interactive map of Cuba Street
- Length: 0.925 km (0.575 mi)
- Location: Te Aro, Wellington
- Postal code: 5012
- Coordinates: 41.2935°S 174.7756°E
- Upper end: Mount Cook
- Lower end: Te Ngākau Civic Square

Other
- Known for: Contributions to New Zealand's culture

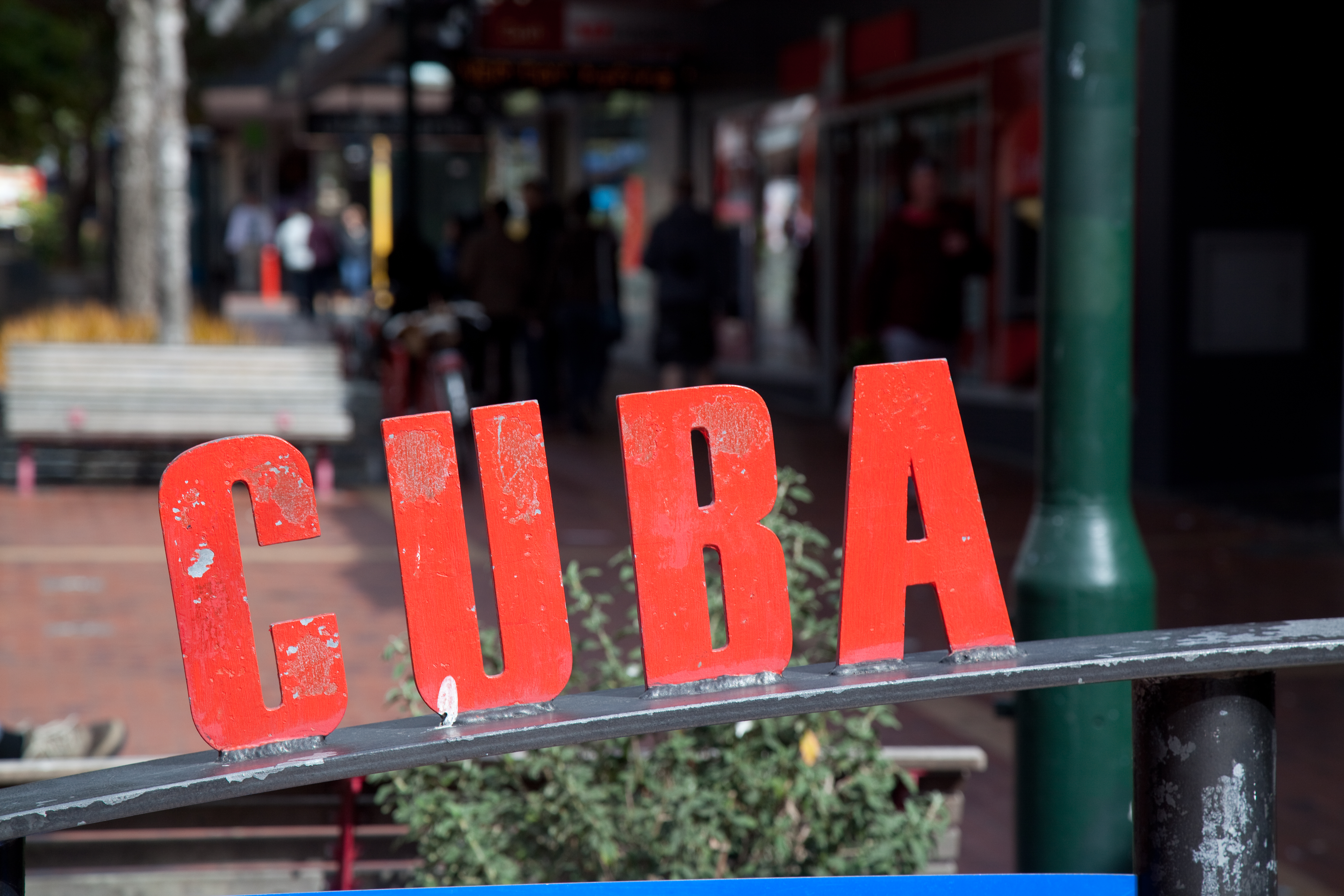
Cuba Street sign

Cuba Street is a city street in Wellington, New Zealand, known for its bohemian nature. One of the best known and most popular streets in the city, Cuba Street and the area around it have been labelled Wellington's cultural centre and the city's "creative heart". Cuba Street (and the surrounding area known as the Cuba Street Precinct) is known for its cafés, op-shops, music venues, restaurants, record shops, bookshops, heritage architecture of various styles, and a general "quirkiness" that has made the street one of the city's most popular tourist destinations. A youth-driven location, the partly pedestrianised Cuba Street is frequented by shoppers and diners year round.

== Toponymy ==
Contrary to assumptions that the street is named after Cuba, the street was named by the first Surveyor General Captain William Mein Smith after the Cuba, an early New Zealand Company settler ship which arrived in Wellington Harbour on 3 January 1840. Some coffee shops and restaurants take this misinterpretation in their stride, having names and colours that reference the island nation of Cuba.

== Location ==
Cuba Street is 925 m (3,035 ft) long and slopes very gently uphill south from Wellington's central business district near the waterfront. The street falls into distinct sections—lower, central and upper Cuba—that have different architectural styles and atmospheres. Facing the north or bottom end of Cuba Street is the Michael Fowler Centre, and the southern or upper end terminates at Webb Street, close to Aro Valley and at the base of the Mt Cook and Brooklyn hills. The middle section of Cuba Street between Dixon Street and Ghuznee Street is a pedestrian mall with chain stores such as Whitcoulls and Glassons, while the southern end (known as the 'top' of Cuba Street, or upper Cuba) is more eclectic or boutique, with smaller independent shops.

Upper Cuba Street is crossed by Vivian Street, which forms the east-bound stretch of State Highway 1, and Karo Drive, the west-bound lanes of State Highway 1 that carry traffic towards the Terrace Tunnel.

== History ==
Developed on Te Āti Awa land in 1842, Cuba Street was originally full of single-storey wooden homes. To the west of Cuba Street lay Te Aro Pā and the swampy ground of Te Aro Flat, and to the east at Thorndon, Lambton Quay and the Terrace was the political and business area of the town. One of the first colonial families to buy land around upper Cuba Street was the Tonks family in the 1840s. William Tonks established a brickworks at Webb Street at the top of Cuba Street in 1847, and the family built houses nearby for themselves and brickworks workers. Streets in the area were named after the Tonks family including Tonks Ave, Arthur Street, and Frederick Street.

A tram service along the street began in 1878, and Cuba Street became a major thoroughfare from the harbour to Mount Cook. By the early 1900s the street contained banks, shops (particularly drapers and clothing shops), restaurants and several large hotels. The original Royal Oak Hotel was built in 1868 on the corner of Cuba Street and Manners Street. It burned down and was replaced, then replaced again with a "colossal" building in 1899. The third Royal Oak Hotel on this site was demolished in 1979 and replaced by the Oaks shopping complex. In 1906 the Wellington Workingmen's Club and Literary Institute moved to a new building at 101-117 Cuba Street, and in 1908 the Salvation Army opened the People's Palace at 207-219 Cuba Street. This was a large hotel offering affordable alcohol-free accommodation for working-class travellers.

James Smiths department store opened in 1907, followed by Woolworths in 1951 and Farmers in 1960 (occupying premises built as a draper's business in 1914). Banks built imposing branches on the street, and from 1935 until 1993 the Municpal Electricity Department had its headquarters and showroom in lower Cuba Street.

Cuba Street thrived until the 1940s but declined after World War 2 as inner-city residents moved to the suburbs and transients moved in. The creation of Cuba Mall in 1969 helped business pick up. Cubacade was a modernist covered shopping arcade opened in 1970 at 104 - 114 Cuba Street in the mall. Although the arcade was replaced in 1999 by the Left Bank apartment and retail complex, the name 'Cubacade' can still be seen on the front of the building.

There was no incentive to develop Upper Cuba Street at this period because there were plans for a motorway bypass across the area, which wasn't completed until 2007. The historic area of upper Cuba Street near Tonks Ave and Arthur Street was re-formed during construction of the bypass: nineteen 19th- and early 20th-century shops and cottages in the path of the bypass were restored and relocated to around the intersection of Cuba St and the new Karo Drive.

Cuba Street was revitalised in the 1990s with the advent of 'coffee culture' and changes in liquor licensing which saw many bars and cafes open up. Construction of apartments led to a population increase.

In 2012, Roger Young of Fidel's café became the unofficial "mayor" of upper Cuba Street, replacing Nelson Nunns of Ellmers lawnmower shop. As of 2023 Young was still "mayor".

=== Former red light district ===
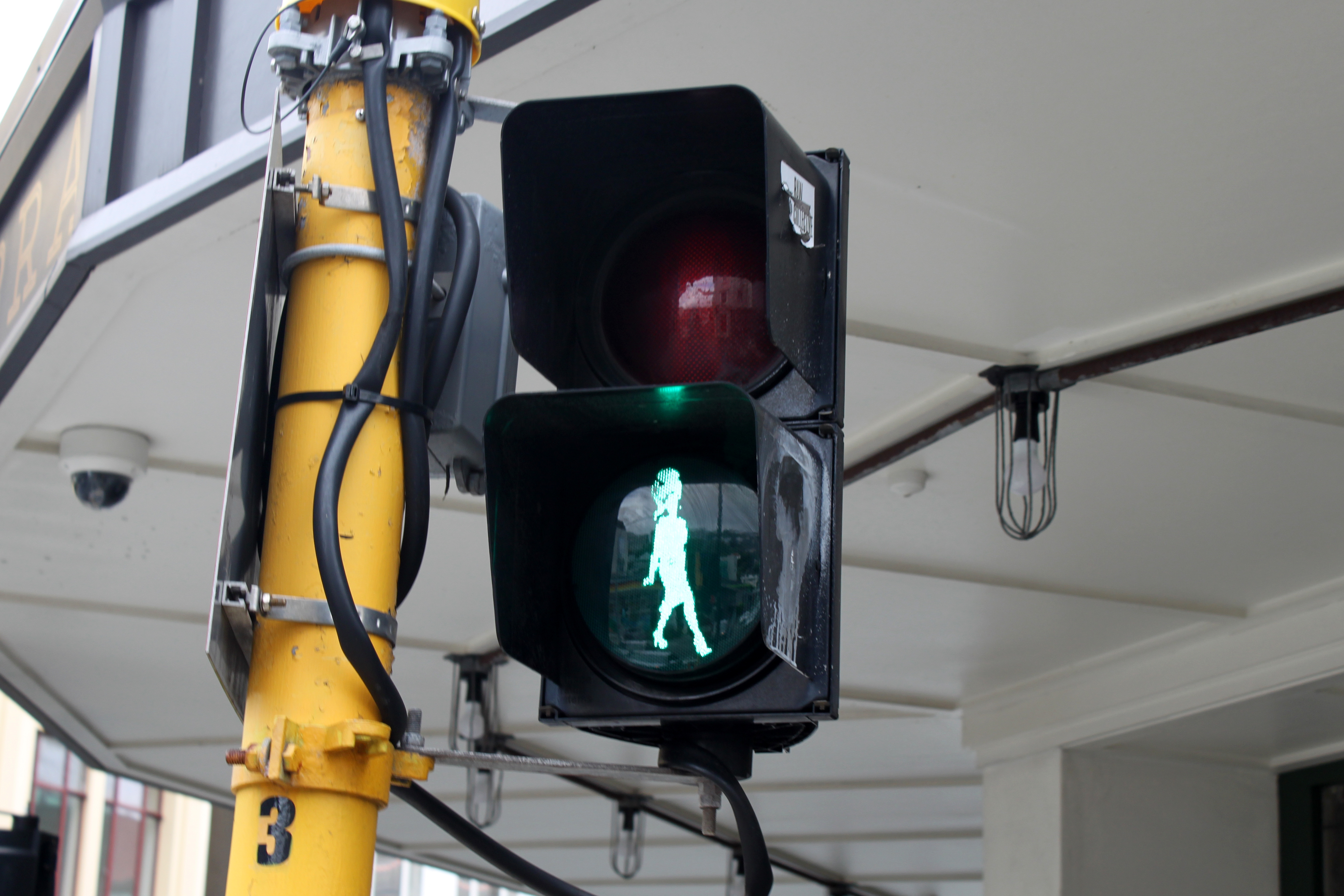
Traffic light with silhouette of Carmen

The area around Marion Street, Vivian Street and the top of Cuba Street was the heart of Wellington's red light district for much of the 20th century. Carmen Rupe, a transgender woman prominent in Wellington in the 1970s, ran Carmen's International Coffee House at 86 Vivian Street where sexual services were available. Carmen is remembered with themed traffic lights in Cuba Street, installed in 2016 to coincide with the 30-year anniversary of the Homosexual Law Reform Bill coming into effect. In 2018 Wellington City Council installed a rainbow-coloured pedestrian crossing at Dixon Street where it bisects Cuba Mall, and in October 2022 two memorial benches were unveiled at the corner of Cuba Street and Vivian Street. The benches commemorate Carmen Rupe and Chrissy Witoko, another transgender businesswoman in the area.

=== Coffee culture ===
From 1926 until the 1970s, Faggs Coffee at 56-60 Cuba Street was one of only a few places in Wellington to buy freshly roasted coffee beans. One of modern Wellington's earliest continental-style coffee houses, the Matterhorn, opened in Cuba Street in 1963. It was run by two Swiss brothers and offered a menu that included strong coffee, stroganoff, sausages and sauerkraut, and Swiss pastries. By the mid-1990s the once-celebrated Matterhorn had a lower profile, but in 1997 it was transformed into a chic lounge bar and music venue, becoming "a Wellington institution". In 2008, Matterhorn was named Cuisine magazine's restaurant of the year. Matterhorn closed in 2017 because the neighbouring Farmers building required earthquake strengthening after the 2016 Kaikōura earthquake and the restaurant could not stay open during the repairs. Various celebrities had frequented the Matterhorn over the years, including Louis Armstrong and the cast of the Lord of the Rings. Elijah Wood had his 21st birthday at the bar.

Other coffee houses followed the Matterhorn, but by 1970 there was less demand for night-time venues due to the introduction of television to New Zealand from 1960 and the end of the 'six o'clock swill' in 1967, which meant that hotels and restaurants could serve food and alcohol until 10 pm in competition with coffee houses.

A revival of 'coffee culture' began in the 1980s. In 1989, Midnight Espresso opened at 178 Cuba Street. It was inspired by the coffee culture in Vancouver and aimed to be an alternative to crowded bars and clubs, an alcohol-free venue where people could hang out until late and talk. Havana Coffee Works was established at Midnight Espresso in 1989 as the owners wanted a better quality bean and flavour than was then available.

Many other coffee bars sprang up along Cuba Street in the 1990s. Krazy Lounge opened at 132 Cuba Street in 1995, in the former premises of a long-running second-hand shop called Krazy Rick's. The café supported the Krazy Knights, a gay rugby team. The Krazy Lounge closed in 2006 and other food premises have since occupied the space. Fidel's café at 234 Cuba Street opened in 1997 and was still operating in 2025, when it had to move temporarily because the building needed earthquake strengthening. Olive at 170 Cuba Street opened in 1997 and closed at the end of 2024 following a downturn in business.

== Historic architecture ==
Cuba street features a range of building styles spanning weatherboard buildings, Victorian, Edwardian, and Art Deco styles constructed during the 19th–20th centuries, and particularly during the street's heyday in the first half of the 20th century. Cuba Street escaped the massive rebuilding that took place in other parts of the Wellington business district from the 1960s to the 1980s, when high rise buildings were constructed on The Terrace, Lambton Quay and surrounding streets. Since 1995 Cuba Street has been a registered Historic Area under the Historic Places Act 1993, with over 40 buildings of historic significance including the Bank of New Zealand building and National Bank Building. Heritage New Zealand notes that the street "has the most complete collection of Victorian and Edwardian commercial architecture in Wellington", with buildings dating from the 1890's to the 1930's featuring architectural influences from Classical through to Art Deco. Many of the older buildings in upper Cuba Street have decorative tiled shop entrances, which is unusual as this feature was usually restricted to grander buildings.

Architectural styles in Cuba Street (lower to upper Cuba)

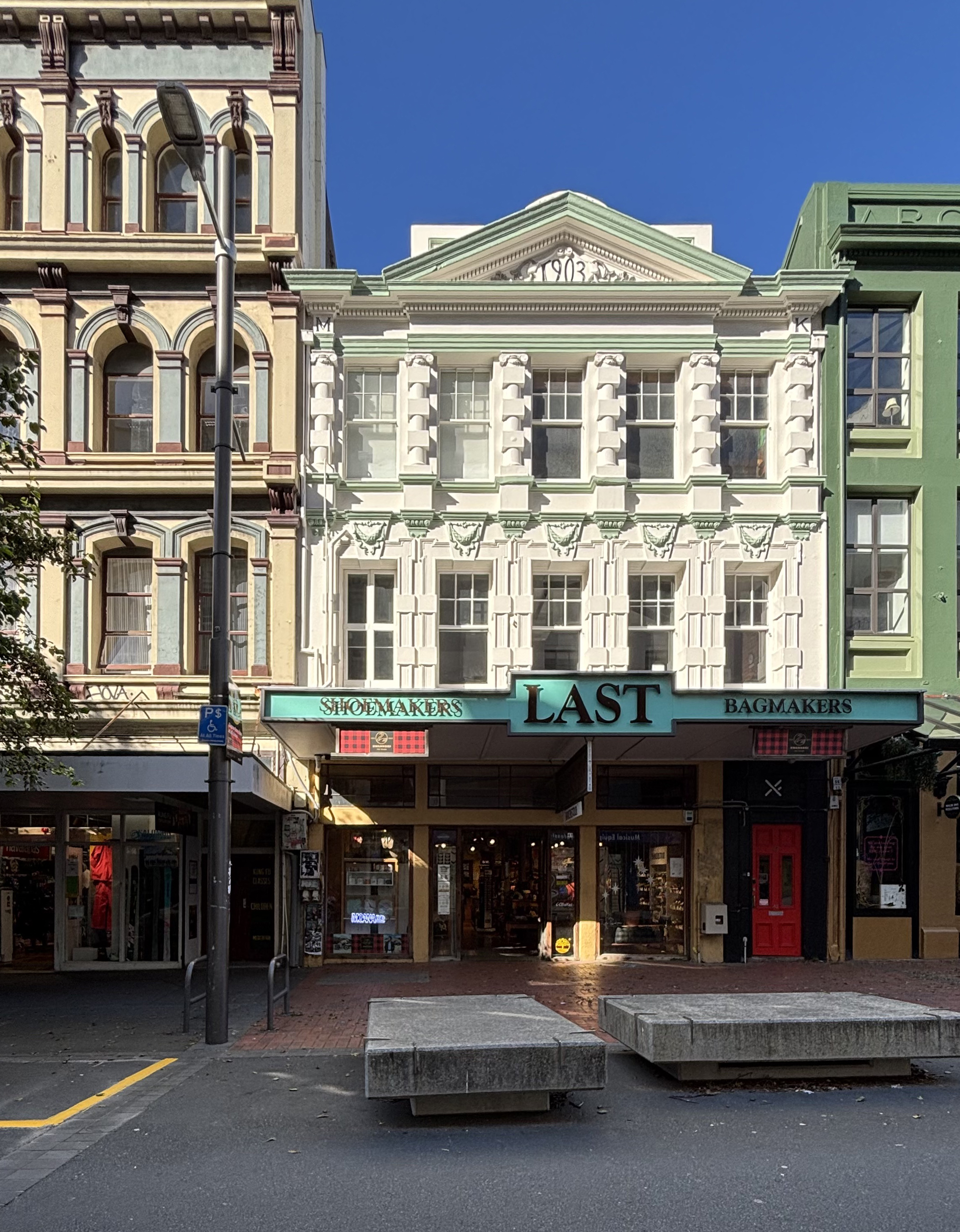
41 Cuba Street

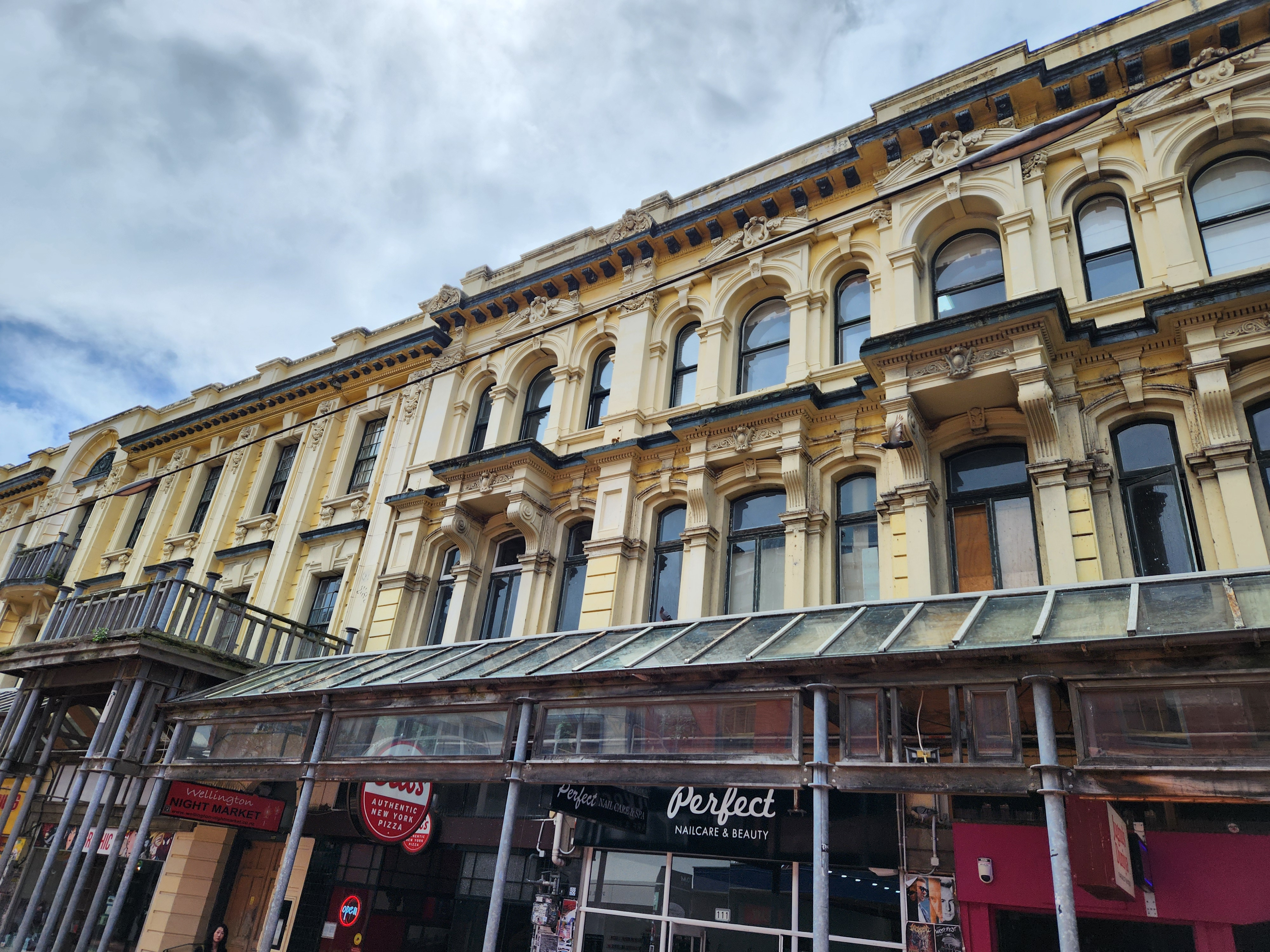
109 Cuba St

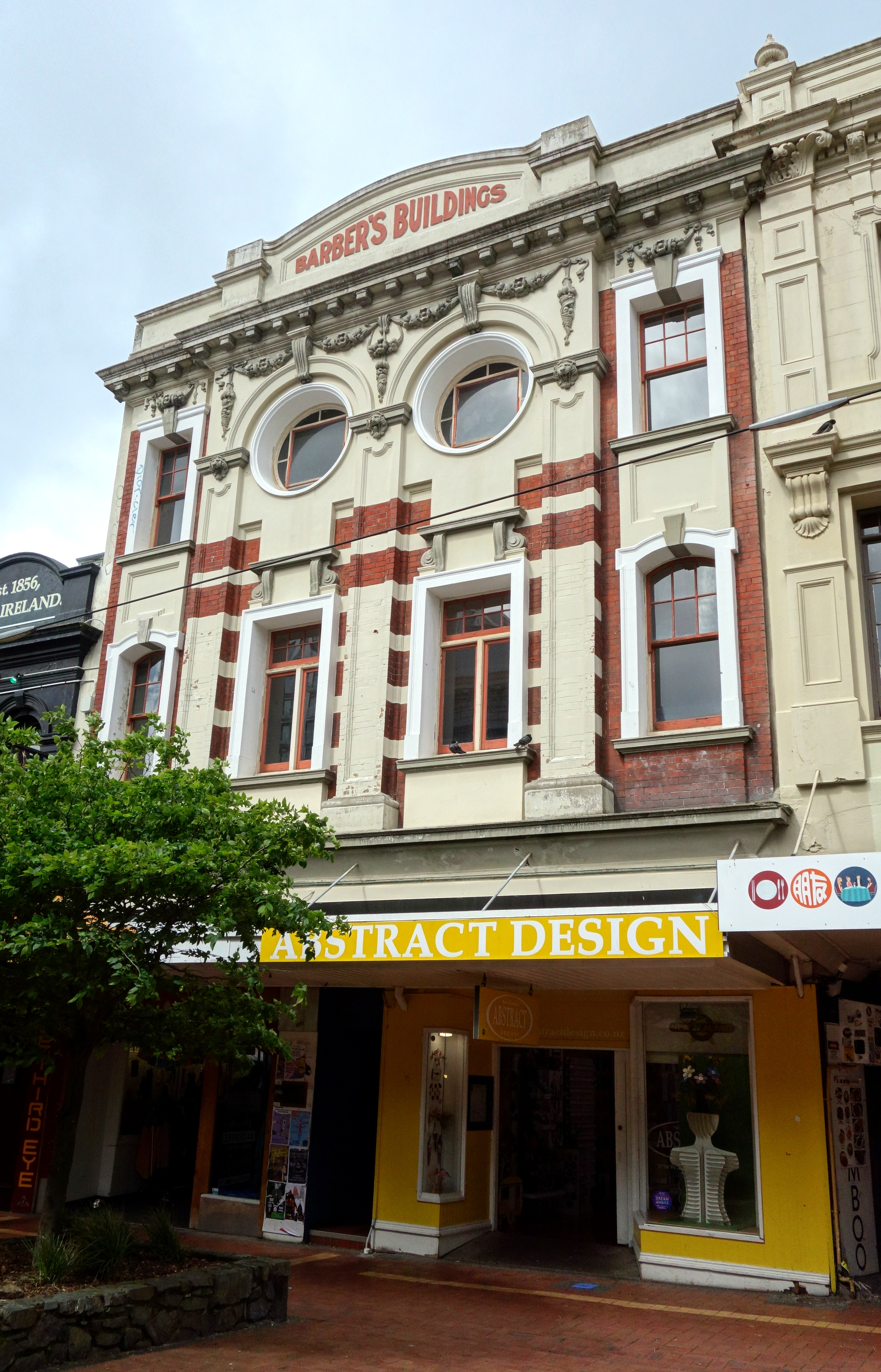
123 Cuba Street

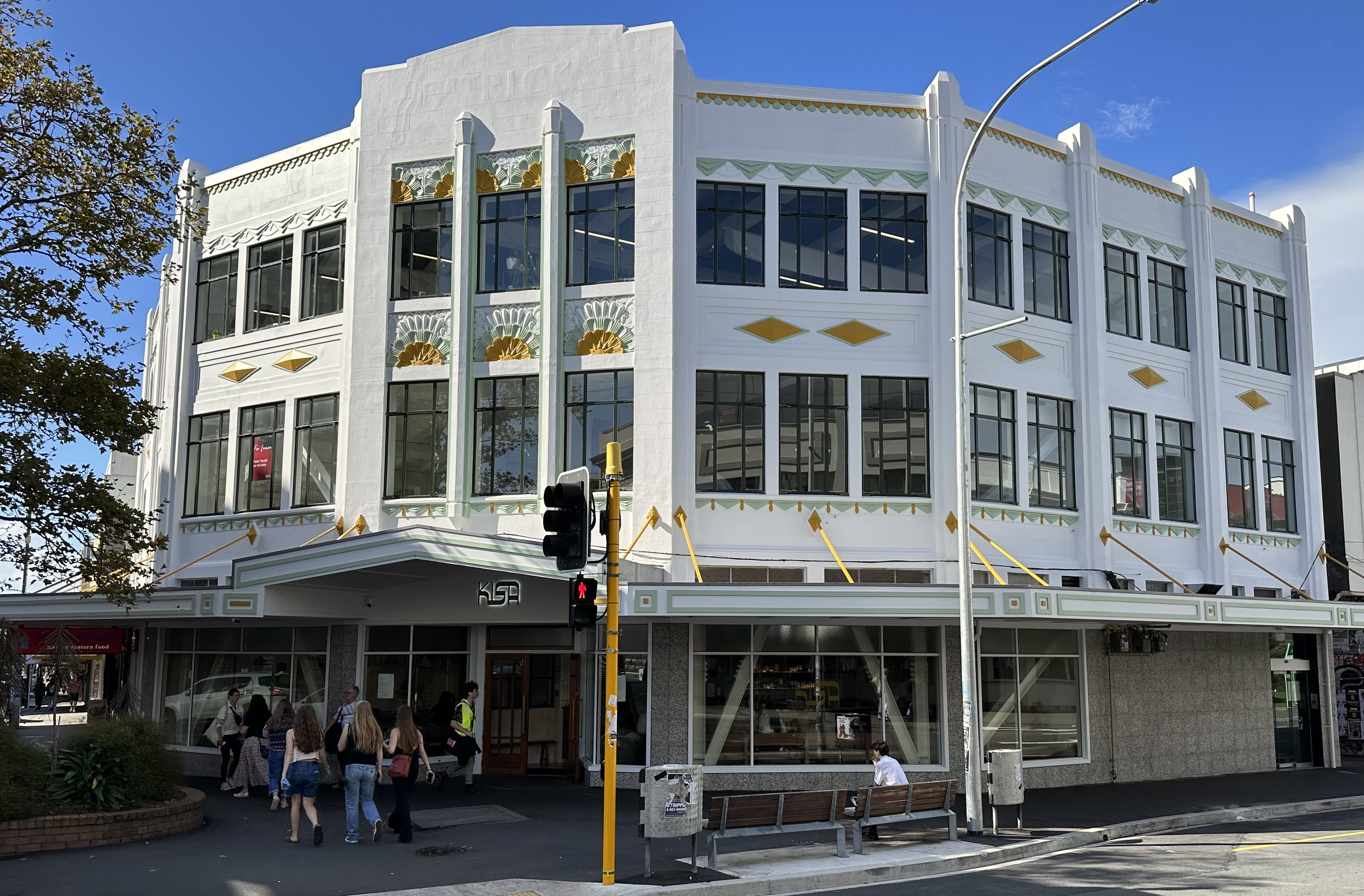
191 Cuba Street

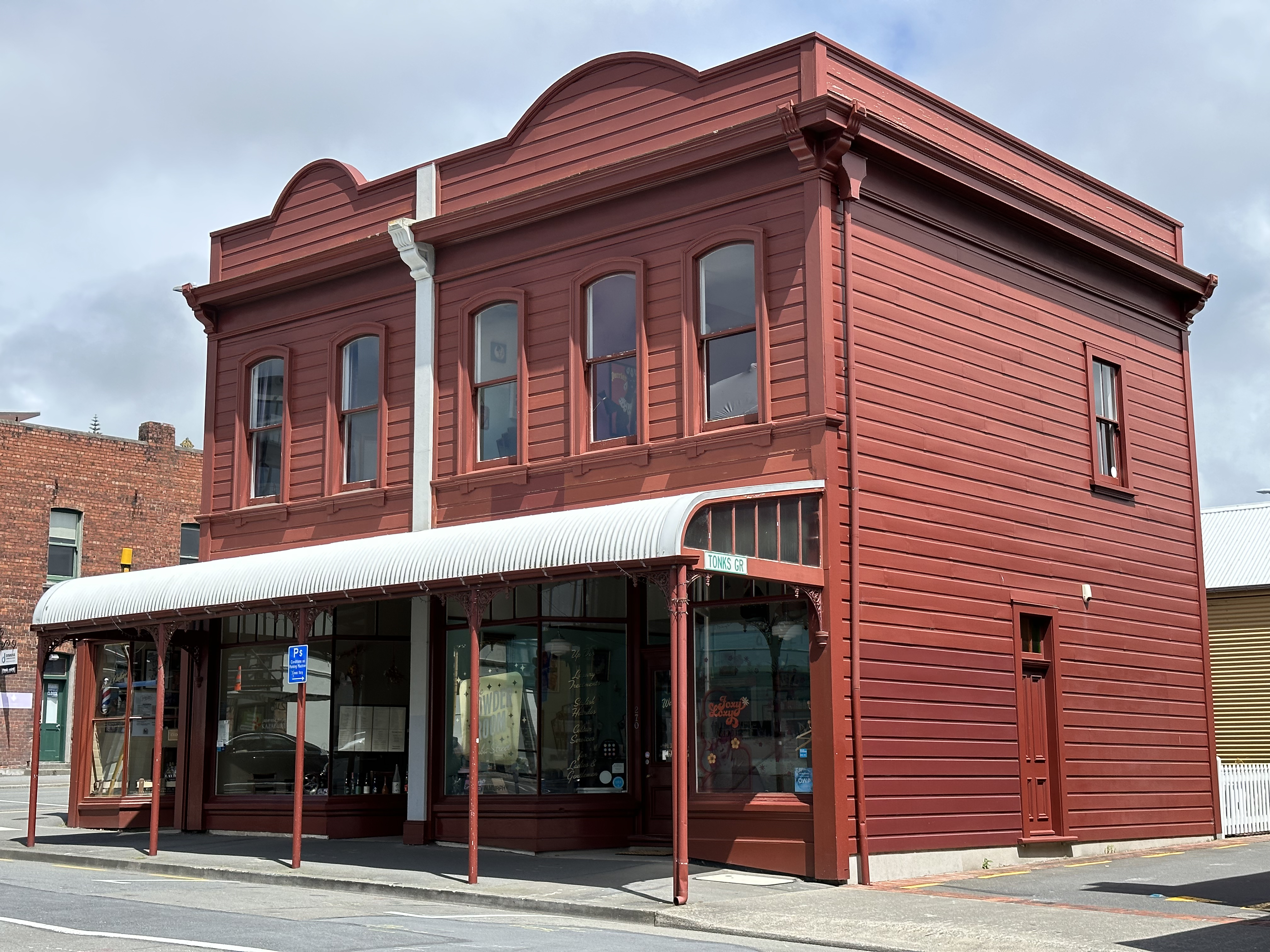
270 Cuba Street

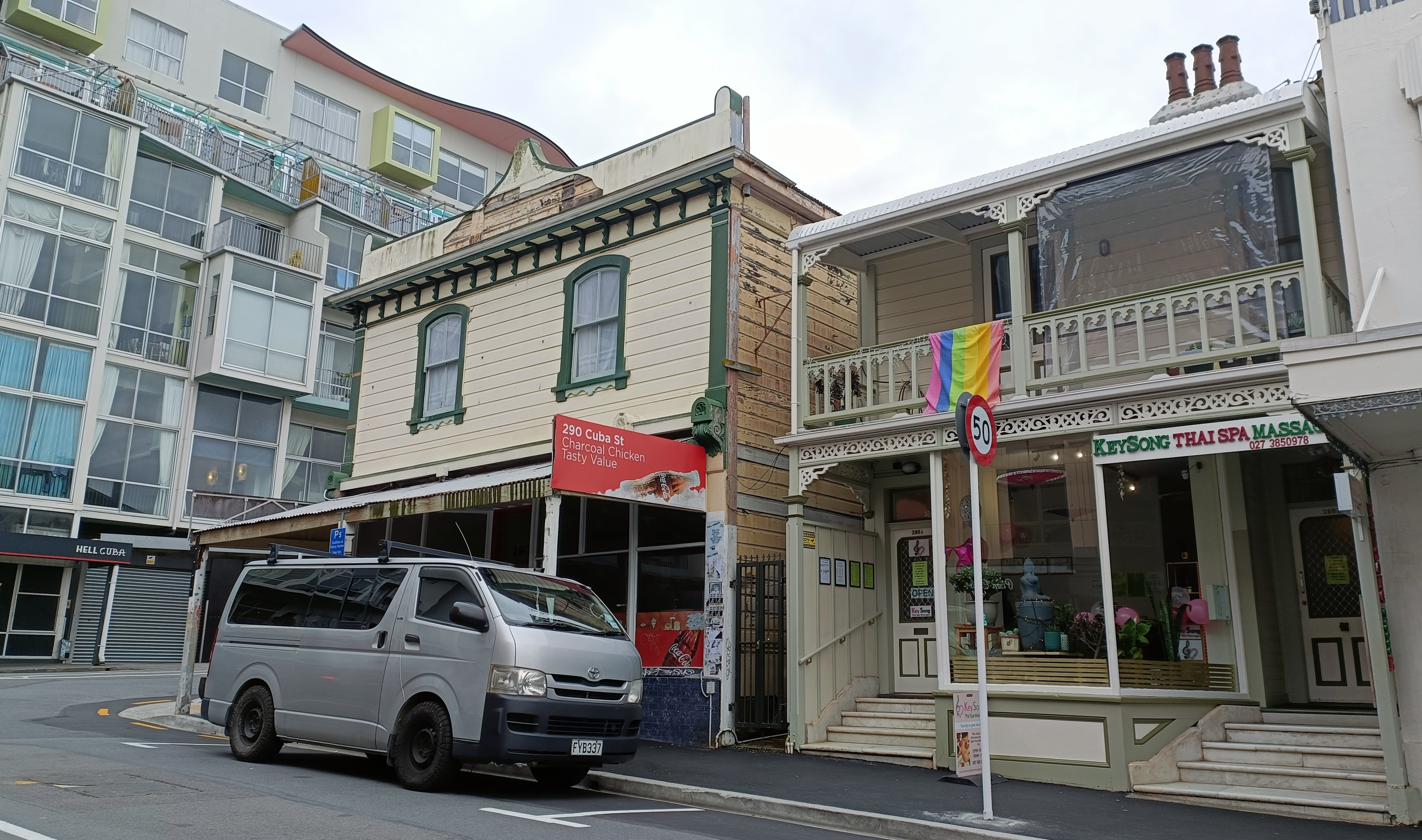
290 Cuba Street

=== Earthquake risk ===
Due to its high number of old buildings, many with heavy ornate façades, Cuba Street has the highest concentration of earthquake-prone buildings in Wellington. About 40 buildings on the street are listed as earthquake-prone. Despite this, there was little building damage from the 2016 Kaikōura earthquake. One of the casualties was Farmers department store, which closed permanently after the earthquake. The historic façade was retained and some interior features were preserved in a new development. Owners of heritage buildings can be caught between the need to improve safety and the requirement to preserve heritage features, which may be unaffordable.

== Shopping ==
As of 2026, the department stores and banks of the 20th century are gone and many Victorian and Edwardian buildings have been repurposed as shops, offices and apartments. There is a variety of shops along Cuba Street and nearby streets, ranging from designer clothing outlets and branches of national chains at the lower end of the street to independent retailers selling vintage clothing, LP records, new and used books, jewellery and many other goods and services. Cuba Street is described as the bohemian creative area of Wellington.

Longstanding businesses include Wellington Seamarket, operated by one family at 220 Cuba Street since 1947; Ellmers, a mower and chainsaw shop that has operated since 1969; Slow Boat Records, which has been in business in Cuba Street since 1985 and is Wellington's longest-operating record shop; and Hunters and Collectors, a vintage clothing shop that has operated for almost 40 years in Cuba Street. The very top of Cuba Street has some original weatherboard buildings and fewer shops.

In 2018 some retailers moved into the adjacent Ghuznee Street.

== Cuba Mall ==
From 1878 until 1964, public trams (steam, then horse-drawn, then electric from 1904) went up Cuba Street as part of the Wellington tramway system. In 1965 Wellington City Council closed parts of Cuba Street temporarily while it removed the tramlines. Following public pressure and a petition signed by 5000 people, the middle section of the street closed to traffic permanently and became a pedestrian mall which opened on 14 October 1969. In 1979 the section between Dixon Street and Manners Street was also closed to traffic, and in 1995 the Council listed Cuba Mall as a historic area. Cuba Mall is home to the Bucket Fountain, a kinetic sculpture installed when the mall was built. Buskers and other street artists often perform in Cuba Mall, and it has been the site of various protests and rallies.

== Hospitality venues ==
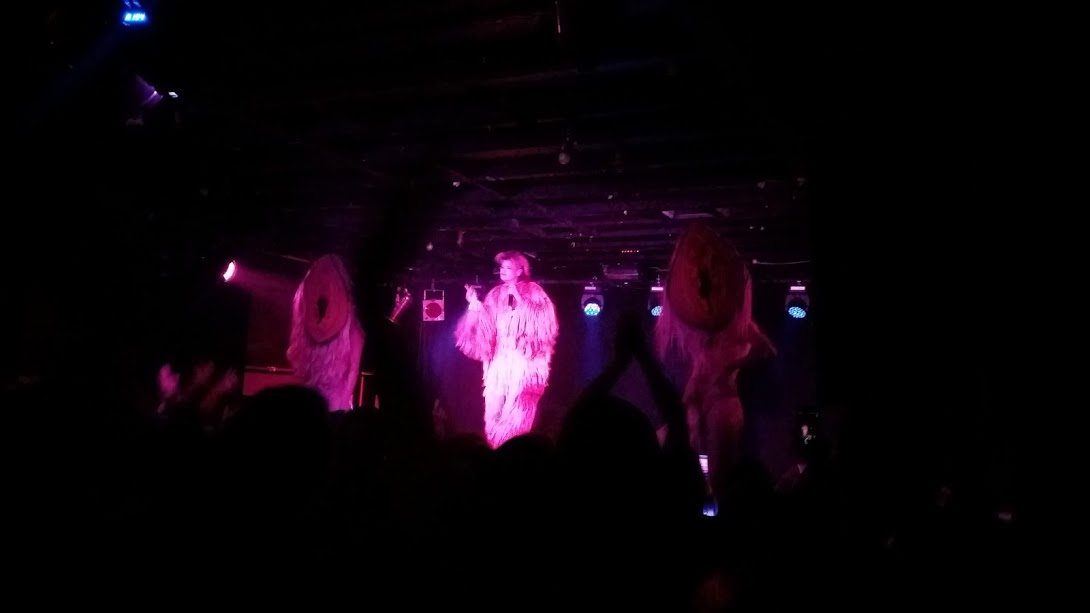
Canadian artist Peaches at San Francisco Bathhouse (San Fran)

As of February 2026, there were around 77 businesses in Cuba Street licensed to serve food, including 34 premises licensed to serve alcohol. Cuba Street has a mix of cafés, takeaways, restaurants and bars ranging from casual noodle houses to fine-dining restaurants such as Logan Brown, which has operated from a former bank building at 192 Cuba Street since 1997. Logan Brown won Cuisine magazine's 'Restaurant of the year' in 2009.

Bars and other venues offer live music in the evenings. Fat Freddy's Drop's first album, Live at the Matterhorn was recorded at the Matterhorn bar in 2001. San Fran (formerly the San Francisco Bathhouse) is a nightclub and live music venue at 171 Cuba Street.

Valhalla is a live music venue very near Cuba Street at 154 Vivian Street. The premises was formerly a strip joint, but opened as a music venue named Hole in the Wall in 1994, and has operated since then under various names and owners.

The Southern Cross bar and restaurant is also located close to Cuba Street on Abel Smith Street, on a site that has been a hotel since the 1850s and home to the Southern Cross since 1960.

== Arts ==
Various art galleries have been long established on Cuba Street. McLeavey Gallery was established at 147 Cuba Street in 1968 by Peter McLeavey and as of 2026 is in the same premises. The gallery displays and sells works by New Zealand artists.

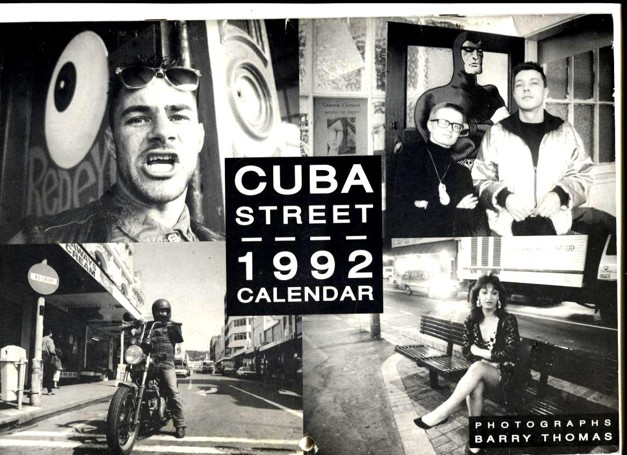
Barry Thomas's 1992 Cuba Street characters calendar which was later displayed as an exhibition.

In 1992 Yeti Productions and Illusions Magazine produced the Cuba Street Calendar featuring 50 local sole traders, musicians and others like Mr. Smiles curiosity shop owner, Peter McLeavey, street workers, Bruno Lawrence, Midnight espresso.

Enjoy Contemporary Art Space was established in 2000 at 174 Cuba Street. As of 2026, it is located in the Left Bank off Cuba Mall. Enjoy fosters new work and facilitates contemporary art projects through various endeavours including exhibitions, projects and publications.

Thistle Hall is an arts and community venue at 293 Cuba Street offering a community art gallery and meeting spaces for creative activities including music, dance and other groups. Thistle Hall is owned by Wellington City Council. The building was built in 1907 as a storehouse and over the years has had many uses, including serving as a dance hall, a picture theatre and a studio. In the 1980s and 1990s it was revitalised as a community venue by a volunteer group of local women.

The Wellington Arts Centre opened in 1979 to run the Summer '79 then the long lasting Summer City programmes from Dransfield House at 355 Willis Street. The organisation was re-named the Toi Pōneke Arts Centre which opened at its Abel Smith Street site near upper Cuba Street in 2005 after 12 years in Oriental Bay. The centre contained artists' studios, rehearsal spaces and music rooms and was home to various arts and theatrical organisations, producers and festival organisations. In May 2026, Toi Pōneke moved to Cable Street and was renamed as Toi Aro.

== Educational institutions ==
Several tertiary educational institutions have been established in Cuba Street and its vicinity, adding to the creative and youth-oriented atmosphere of the area.

Victoria University's Faculty of Architecture and Design Innovation opened in Vivian Street near upper Cuba Street in 1994, in a refurbished 1970s building formerly occupied by Air New Zealand. As well as offering qualifications in architecture, urban design, and related subjects, the school hosts conferences, exhibitions and events.

The French hospitality and culinary education institution Le Cordon Bleu established a cooking school at 52 Cuba Street in 2012. The institute has a brasserie where its students prepare and serve the food, and it offers cooking workshops to the public.

Te Kāhui Auaha – The New Zealand Institute of Applied Creativity opened in 2018 in the former Woolworths building on the corner of Cuba Street and Dixon Street and in a neighbouring building in Dixon Street. The campus included two theatres, a 55-seater cinema, an exhibition gallery and a performance studio, and offered courses in drama, performing arts, dance, music, mechanical engineering, hospitality, and business administration. Te Auaha aimed "to provide a dynamic learning and teaching environment that 'makes and remakes future creative technologies and the arts by inspiring creativity and nurturing talent'", but the campus closed at the end of 2025 due to funding issues and a lack of student enrolments.

As of 2026, Cuba Street is also home to private schools teaching dance, art, DJ-ing, martial arts and Spanish.

== Events ==
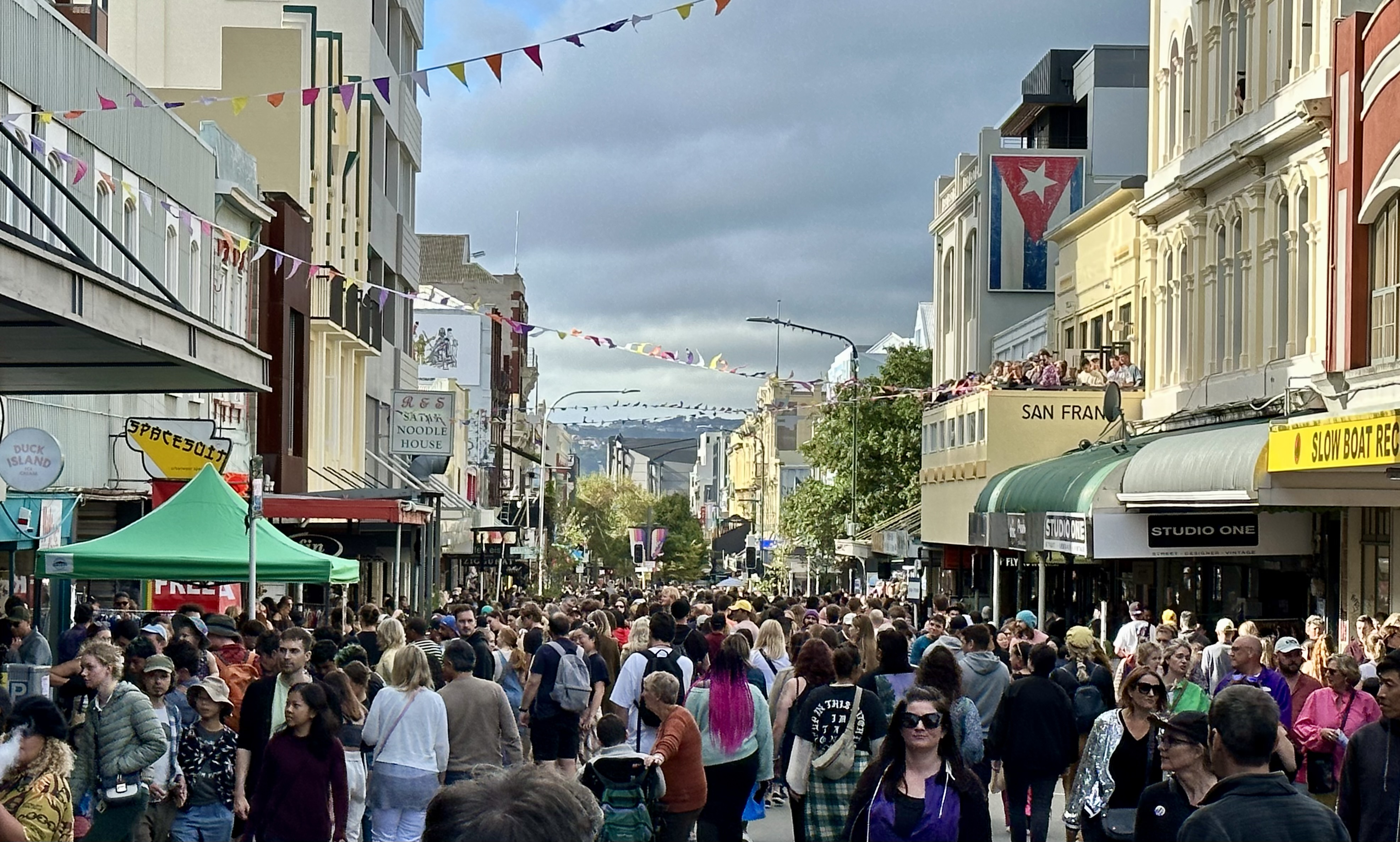
Crowds at Cuba Dupa, 2023

The Cuba Street Carnival was a street parade and creative celebration in Cuba Street that was held intermittently from the 1980s and saw crowds of 10,000–20,000 people. It stopped in 2009 due to a lack of funding, and was revived in 2015 under the name Cubadupa.

Cuba Dupa is held over a weekend in late March each year. The festival features a dozen music stages, parade groups, street theatre and dance performances, visual art installations, and food and beverage vendors. The festival is managed and produced by the non-profit Creative Capital Arts Trust and attracts up to 100,000 people.

== Points of interest ==
=== Bucket Fountain ===
The Bucket Fountain is a brightly-coloured kinetic sculpture installed in Cuba Mall when it was built in 1969. The sculpture consists of 13 buckets or scoops of various sizes. Water pours from pipes into the small top buckets, which then tip and empty into the bigger ones below. When the largest bucket is full, it tips into the pool that surrounds the sculpture. The fountain is notorious for splashing passers-by. In 2003, Wellington City Council refurbished the sculpture. One bucket was re-installed backwards, making it more prone to splashing onto the footpath.

=== The Philanthropist's Stone ===
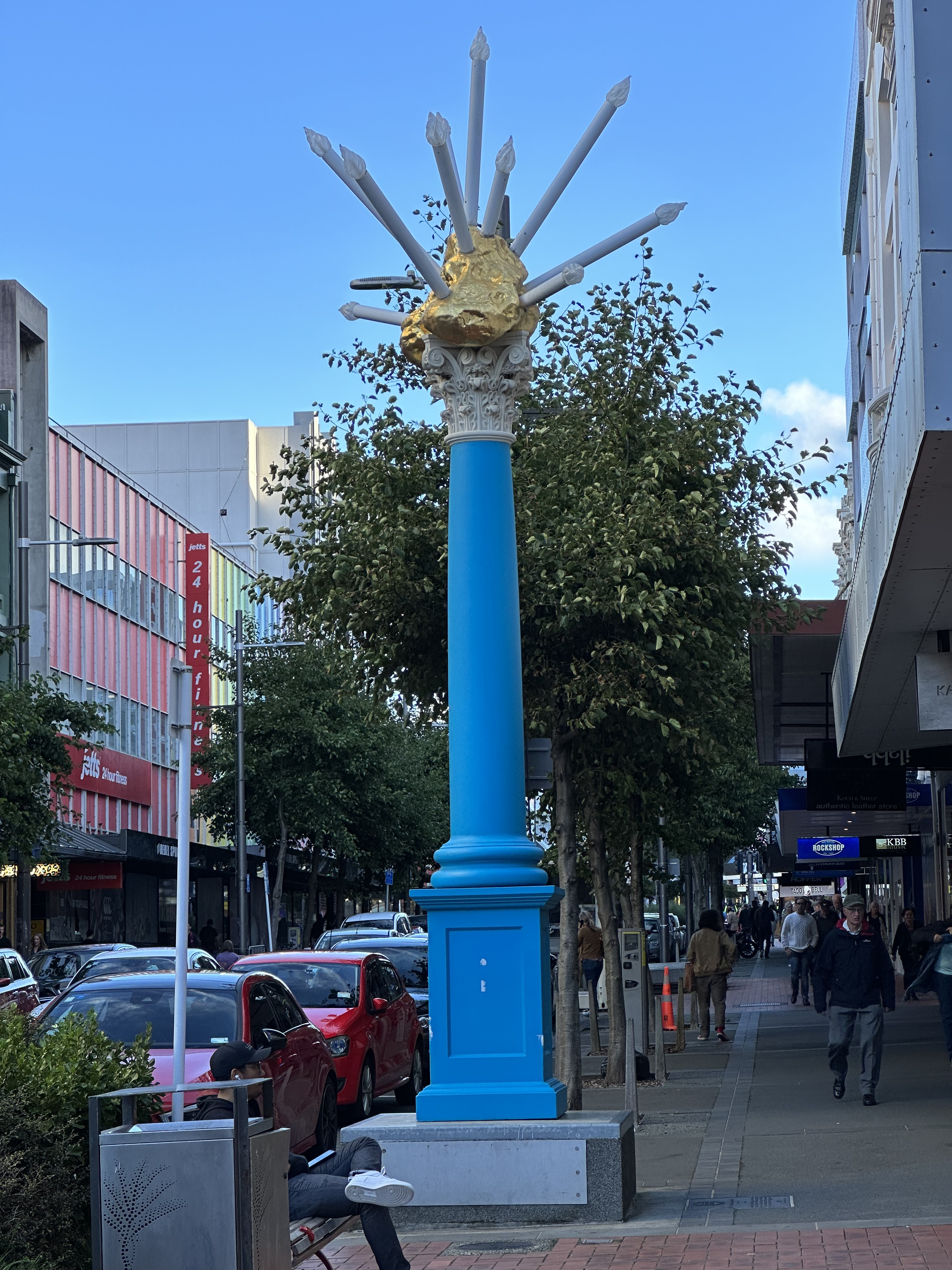
The Philanthropist's Stone, lower Cuba Street

The Philanthropist's Stone is a sculpture in lower Cuba Street that was unveiled in 2015 to commemorate the 2012 centenary of the establishment of the T G Macarthy Trust, New Zealand's largest charitable trust. Thomas George Macarthy was a Wellington businessman, public figure and philanthropist. The trust was established on his death in 1912. The sculpture, designed by Scott Eady, is over 6 metres high and consists of a blue Corinthian column on a pedestal, topped by a large gold-plated bronze nugget with light-up candles sticking out of it. The Wellington Sculpture Trust, which funded the sculpture with the T G Macarthy Trust, states that "the gold nugget references the gold rush that brought Macarthy to New Zealand, and the column is typical of the classical modern architectural features used in/on buildings around the early 1900s. The candles are celebratory but also speak to the way the Trust has been a beacon of hope for countless numbers since its inception." Public reaction to the sculpture was mixed, with some thinking the nugget looked like a "gold poo".

=== Umbrella ===
Umbrella is a sculpture of a large umbrella with a multi-coloured cover, created by Peter Kundycki. It was installed at the intersection of Cuba and Wakefield Streets in 1990, but was moved around 1997 to the intersection of Cuba Street and Manners Mall and moved again to Cuba Street at Dixon Street in 2010 when Manners Mall was opened up to traffic. The sculpture is 4 metres high and almost 4 metres wide. Originally the umbrella cover was made of fabric, but this was later replaced with aluminium.

=== Mary Taylor ===
A heritage storyboard at the intersection of Cuba and Dixon streets commemorates Mary Taylor (1817–1893) who owned and ran a small Cuba Street general store from c. 1840 to 1860. The shop no longer exists. Taylor was a lifelong friend and correspondent of author Charlotte Brontë and wrote to her about life in Wellington.
