= Cuba Street Carnival =

Carnival in Wellington, New Zealand

Coordinates: 41.2933°S 174.7757°E

The Cuba Street Carnival was a street parade and creative celebration in Cuba Street, Wellington, New Zealand that was intermittently held from the 1980s and saw crowds of 10,000–20,000 people. It stopped in 2009 due to a lack of funding, and was revived in 2015 under the name Cubadupa.

== History ==
Cuba street has seen many iterations of street festivals over the years starting with The Upper Cuba St Carnival which was originated between Webb st. and Able smith street by Martin Wilson. This ran through the 1980s and in 1995. Another was held on 7 and 8 December 1991 including the Whirling Circus. and another in 1993 run by Barry Thomas of Yeti Productions.

Chris Morley-Hall re-launched the Cuba Street Carnival alongside Murray Mcdonald, in 1998 as a public celebration recognising Cuba Street as the creative heart of Wellington. The Cuba Street Carnival expanded the former Upper Cuba Street Carnival by including the entirety of Cuba street and all of its surrounding streets and eventually incorporated the whole of Courtney place. After three years of working closely with Central Government, Wellington City Council, Emergency services and local business‘s, Chris Morley-Hall managed to secure a resource consent to allow the event to take place on an annual basis. This resource consent continues to be the foundation of the current smaller iteration, Cuba Dupa. The Cuba Street Carnival involved hundreds of artists, performers, International street buskers, an elaborate night street parade, and street market. The Carnival was inspired by the Notting Hill Carnival and other raucous street parades and fairs. The Cuba St Carnival became New Zealands largest street celebration and attracted crowds of approximately 100,000 to 150,000 people.

The event became biennial in 2009, in order to avoid clashing with the New Zealand International Arts Festival.

Among the acts to have played at the festival are Fat Freddy's Drop, Trinity Roots, and The Black Seeds. Notable parade performers have included samba bands Wellington Batucada and AKSamba.

== Revival ==
In 2011, the Creative Capital Arts Trust was established to run both Wellington's Fringe Festival and the Cuba Street Carnival. However, a date for the Cuba Street Carnival was not set. In 2012, the trust was approached by the Wellington City Council to formulate an event development plan to run the festival again.

In 2014, the Wellington City Council set aside $250,000 towards a new Cuba St festival in late March or early April 2015, which would cost about $500,000 in total. The revival is called CubaDupa.
