= CubaDupa =

New Zealand art festival

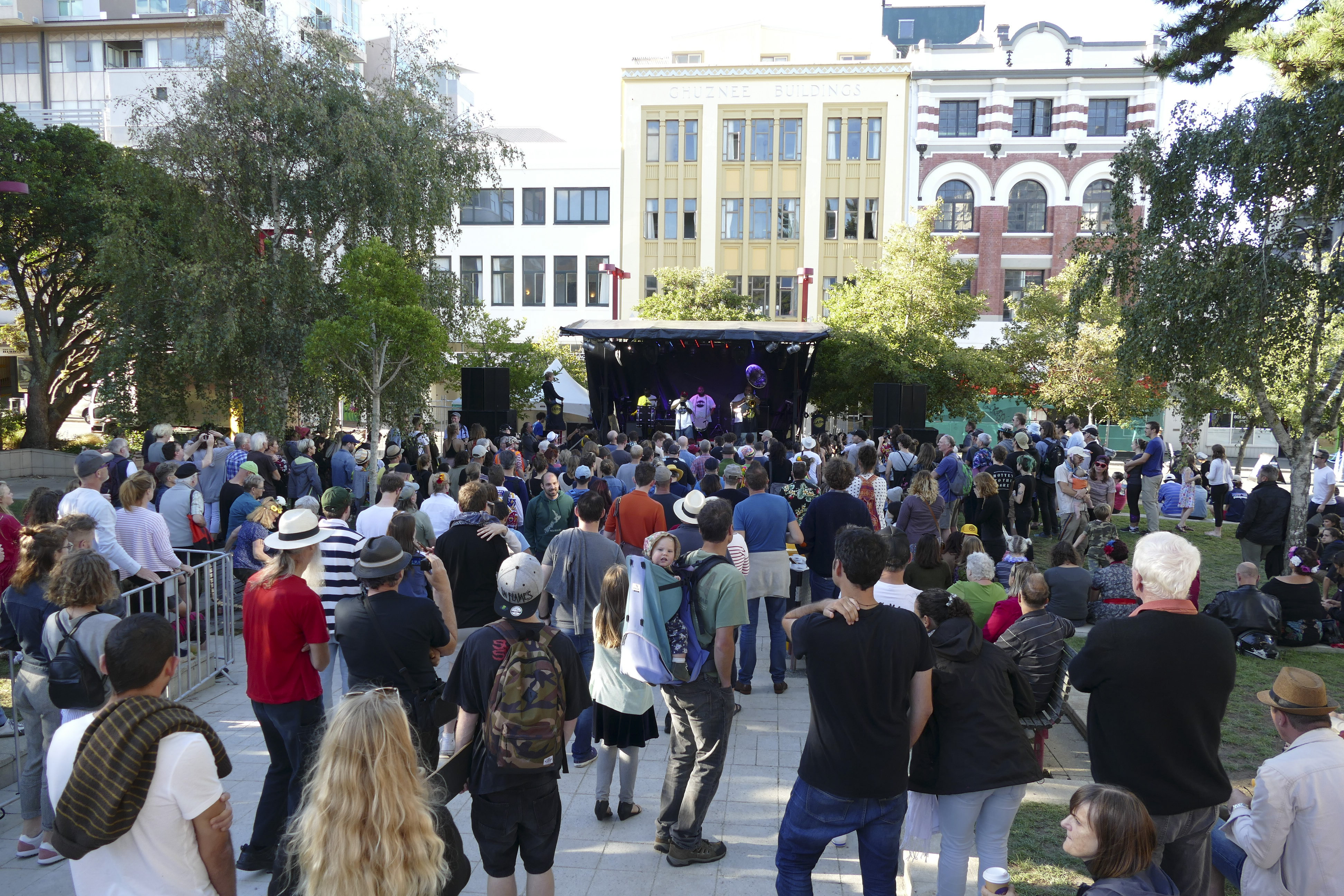
- Free Agents Brass Band @ CubaDupa, 25 March 2018
- Genre: Arts festival
- Dates: 2025: 29–30 March (exact dates vary each year)
- Location: Cuba Street, Wellington
- Country: New Zealand
- Years active: 2015–present
- Founded: 2015
- Website: www.cubadupa.co.nz

CubaDupa is New Zealand's largest outdoor arts and music festival, celebrating the unique character of Cuba Street, Wellington. CubaDupa describes itself as "a creative playground blurring the lines between audience & performer." It attracts up to 100,000 people. The festival is managed and produced by the non-profit Creative Capital Arts Trust. It is held each year over a weekend (Saturday to Sunday) in late March. The festival features a dozen music stages, parade groups, street theatre performances, visual art installations, and food and beverage vendors. Some central city streets are closed with Cuba Street in the centre, creating a large pedestrian festival zone. Many artists participate in the CubaDupa programme, including acts from all over the world. In 2023, over 1,200 artists were signed up to perform, in 41 different venues around the city centre.

== History ==
Cuba street has seen many iterations of street festivals over the years starting with The Upper Cuba St Carnival which originated between Webb st and Able smith street by Martin Wilson. This ran through the 1980s and in 1995.[2][3] Another was held on 7 and 8 December 1991 including the Whirling Circus.[4] and another in 1993 run by Barry Thomas of Yeti Productions.[5]

Chris Morley-Hall launched the Cuba Street Carnival alongside Murray Mcdonald, in 1998 as a free public celebration recognising Cuba Street as the creative heart of Wellington. The Cuba Street Carnival was a significant expansion on the former Upper Cuba Street Carnival from the 80's, by including the entirety of Cuba street, all of its surrounding streets and eventually incorporating the whole of Courtney place. After three years of working closely with Central Government, Wellington City Council, Emergency services and local business's, Chris Morley-Hall managed to secure a ground breaking resource consent to allow the event to take place on an annual basis. This resource consent continues to be the foundation of the current smaller iteration, Cuba Dupa. The Cuba Street Carnival involved hundreds of artists, performers, International street buskers, an elaborate night street parade, and street market. The Carnival was inspired by the Notting Hill Carnival and other raucous street parades and fairs. The Cuba St Carnival became New Zealands largest street celebration and attracted crowds of approximately 100,000 to 150,000 people.[1]

Among the acts to have played at the festival are Fat Freddy's Drop, Trinity Roots, and The Black Seeds.[1] Notable parade performers have included samba bands Wellington Batucada and AKSamba.

In the wake of 2008 global financial crises, funding for arts organisations became even more strained as already tight funding was being slashed by both central and local governments with private investment all but drying up. In response Chris Morley-Hall and Anna Cameron proposed the establishment of The Creative Capital Arts Trust1 in 2209. The establishment of the Creative Capital Trust created an umbrella organisation to consolidate the staff required to operate four arts festivals Cuba St Carnival Cuba Street Carnival, New Zealand Fringe Festival New Zealand Fringe Festival, Comedy festival 2 and the Wellington International Jazz Festival 3 which each ran annually on limited budgets and part time contracts for staff. The Creative Capital Arts Trust was a solution to streamlining a variety of smaller arts organisations under one roof while providing permanent employment for a core staff. By the time the trust was established in 2011 the International Jazz festival had already been incorporated into the New Zealand International Arts Festival and the Comedy festival expanded to become national. The trust still overseas and runs the revamped Cuba Street Carnival (Cuba Dupa) CubaDupa and the Wellington Fringe festival.

In 2015, with the resource consent and vision from the original Cuba St Carnival the newly formed non-profit Creative Capital Arts Trust, and the Wellington City Council. brought back the Cuba Street Carnival, renamed as CubaDupa.

== Team and partners ==
As of 2024, Bianca Bailey has taken over the role of CubaDupa festival director, originally joining the team in 2020 as CCAT Music and Festival Producer. Drew James was the "founder and creative force" behind CubaDupa. He began as Artistic Director from 2015 to 2019. In 2020, Gerry Paul took the role of Festival Director, while James assumed the position of CCAT Chief Executive and remained as a creative consultant. In 2021, James became Festival Director as well as being CCAT Chief Executive. Bianca Bailey, CubaDupa Festival Producer.

Though run by the CCAT, CubaDupa is financially supported in part by local partners. In 2023, these partners included the Arts Council of NZ Toi Aotearoa/Creative NZ, E Tū Whānau, Wellington City Council, Te Māngai Pāho, the Four Winds Foundation, The Lion Foundation, NZ Community Trust, and Pub Charity Limited.

Most of the workers at the event itself are volunteers, in roles such as event support, zone supervisors, artist minders, greenroom attendants, and parade marshals.

== Festivals ==
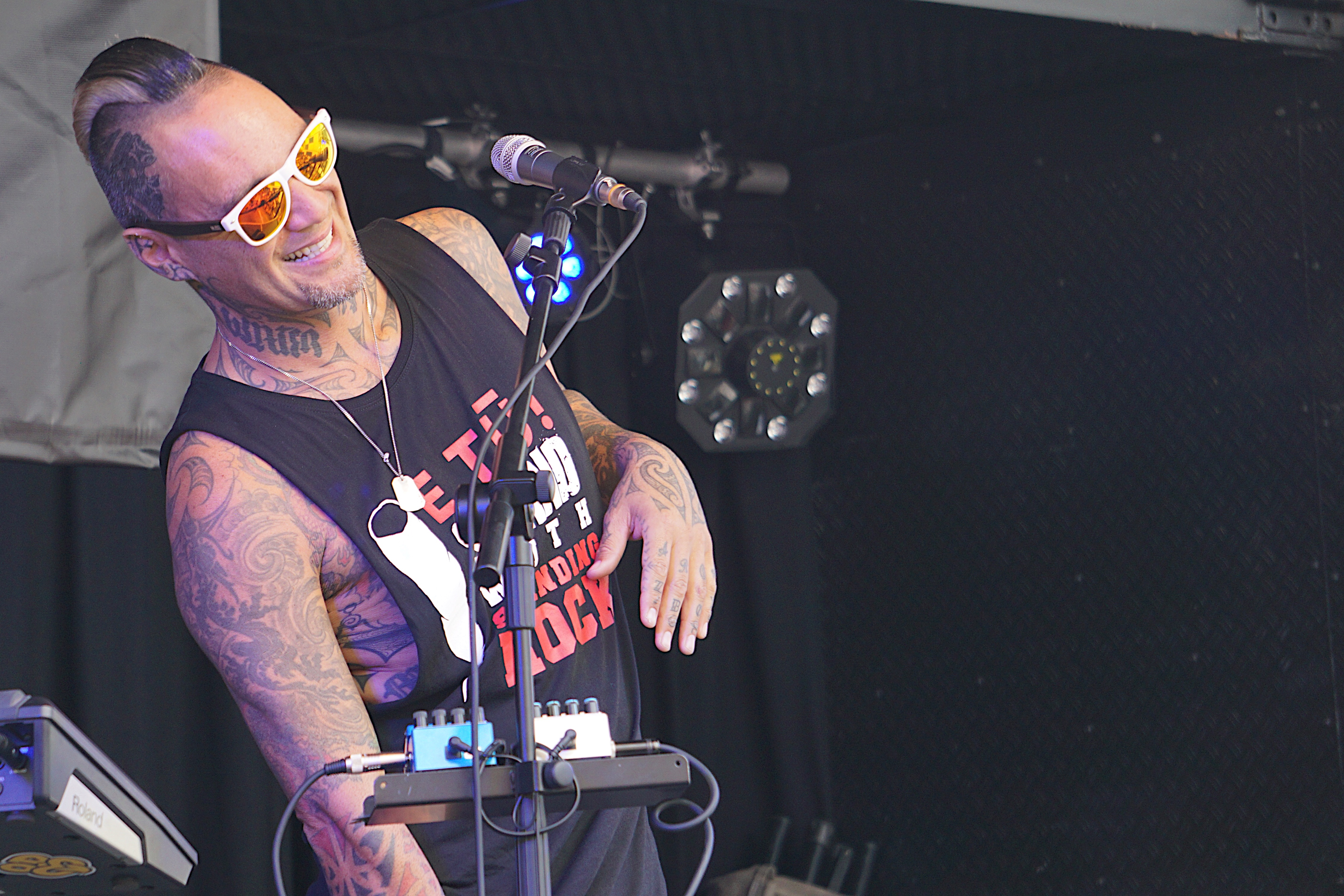
Tiki Taane in concert at CubaDupa 2017

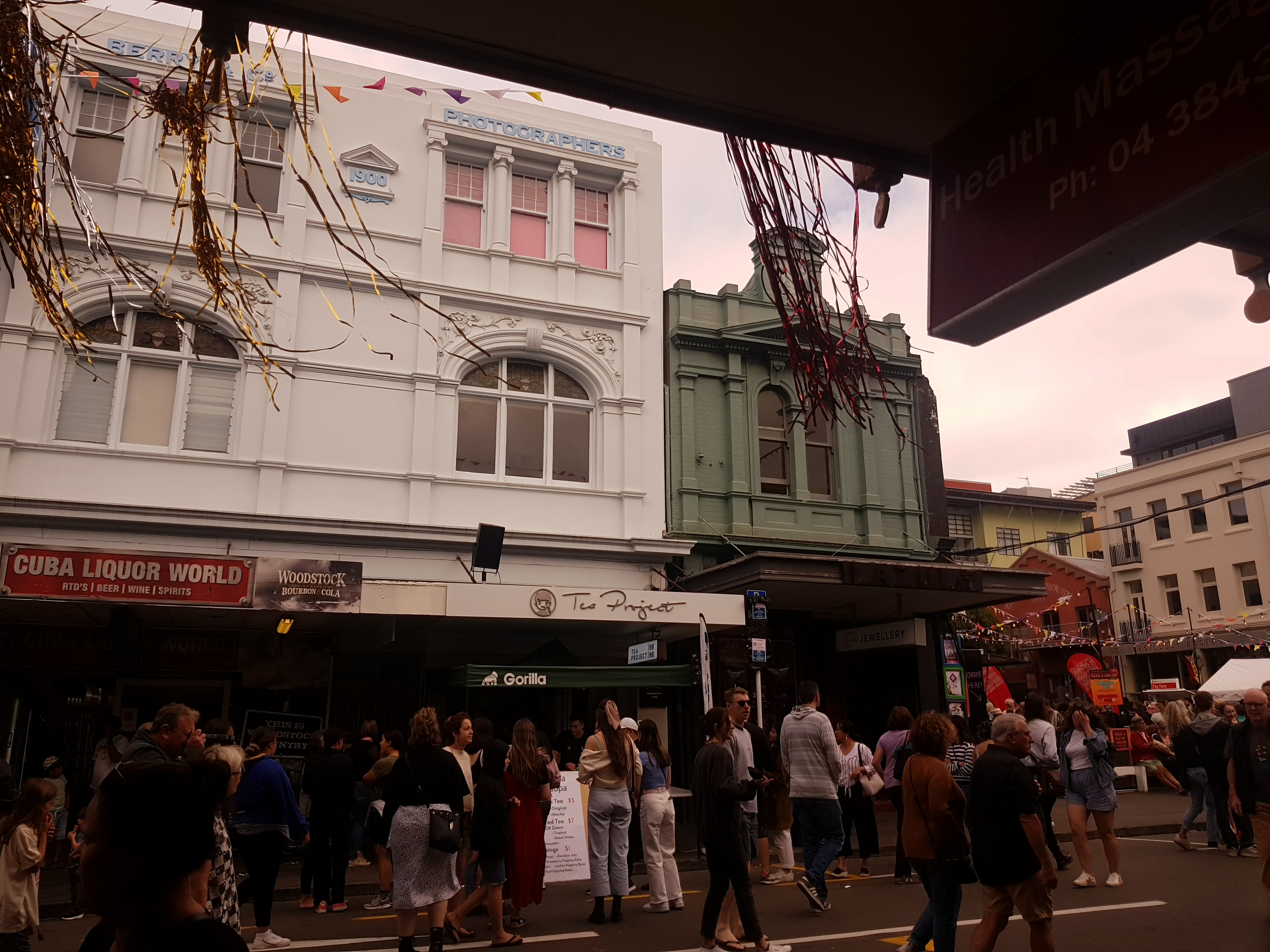
Upper Cuba Street

Some of the events of the 2015 festival were 100 Brazilian samba drummers hosted by Wellington Batucada and The Grand Opening tours of the Opera House produced by Barbarian Productions as well as stages with bands. The new brand for CubaDupa was a finalist in the 2015 Designers Institute of New Zealand, Best Design Awards in the Small Brand Identity category.

In 2017, the CubaDupa festival was reported as having 250 events including samba performances, opera, dance, steampunks, and virtual reality tours and 90 street food stalls.

The 2019 programme included Cha Wa from New Orleans, Alien Weaponry, and New Zealand dance company Touch Compass. The programme and locations were changed to create a more security-focused event after the Christchurch Terror Attacks just prior on 15 March.

The COVID-19 pandemic in New Zealand forced the cancellation of the 2020 festival, with the decision made very close to the event. There were 1500 artists and 450 performances lined up. A live streaming event occurred on Saturday 18 April.

The festival was revived in 2021, after COVID-19 cases had fallen significantly and lockdown restrictions had been lifted. It had over 120,000 attendees on the Saturday alone, surpassing the typical crowd of 100,000 across both days. Reportedly, the Director-General of Health at the time, Ashley Bloomfield, who was heavily involved in the efforts against COVID-19, paid a visit to the event.

In 2022, the festival was again cancelled, just six weeks before the event, due to a spike in COVID-19. They had planned for a "portal-entering" theme, which they postponed to re-use in 2023.

== Policies ==
Though The Cuba Precinct is a liquor ban zone and CubaDupa is family friendly event, alcohol is available to buy and drink during the festival in designated licensed areas.

The festival is committed to "providing an accessible and welcoming experience for festival-goers with specific requirements or additional needs."

They are also progressing toward being a Zero Waste event, and in 2023 are implementing measures such as being plastic bag free, having dedicated waste and recycling bin stations, requiring compostable packaging from all participating street food stalls, supplying reusable cups to all drink vendors, and collaborating with Native Sparkling to donate toward planting native trees.
