= Barrett Reef =

The cluster of rocks that is Barrett Reef (often known as Barrett's Reef) is one of the most hazardous reefs in New Zealand.

It lies on the western side of the entrance of Wellington Harbour, on the approaches to the city of Wellington, at coordinates 41°21′9″S 174°50′6″E. The reef is named after Richard (Dicky) Barrett (1807–1847), a whaler and trader. Its Māori name is Tangihanga-a-Kupe, (Mourning of Kupe), which may refer to the reef's similarity to a line of mourners at a tangi, the sad sound of the water around the reef, or Kupe crying for people he left behind in his travels. The reef is popular with recreational divers.

== Dangerous entrance ==
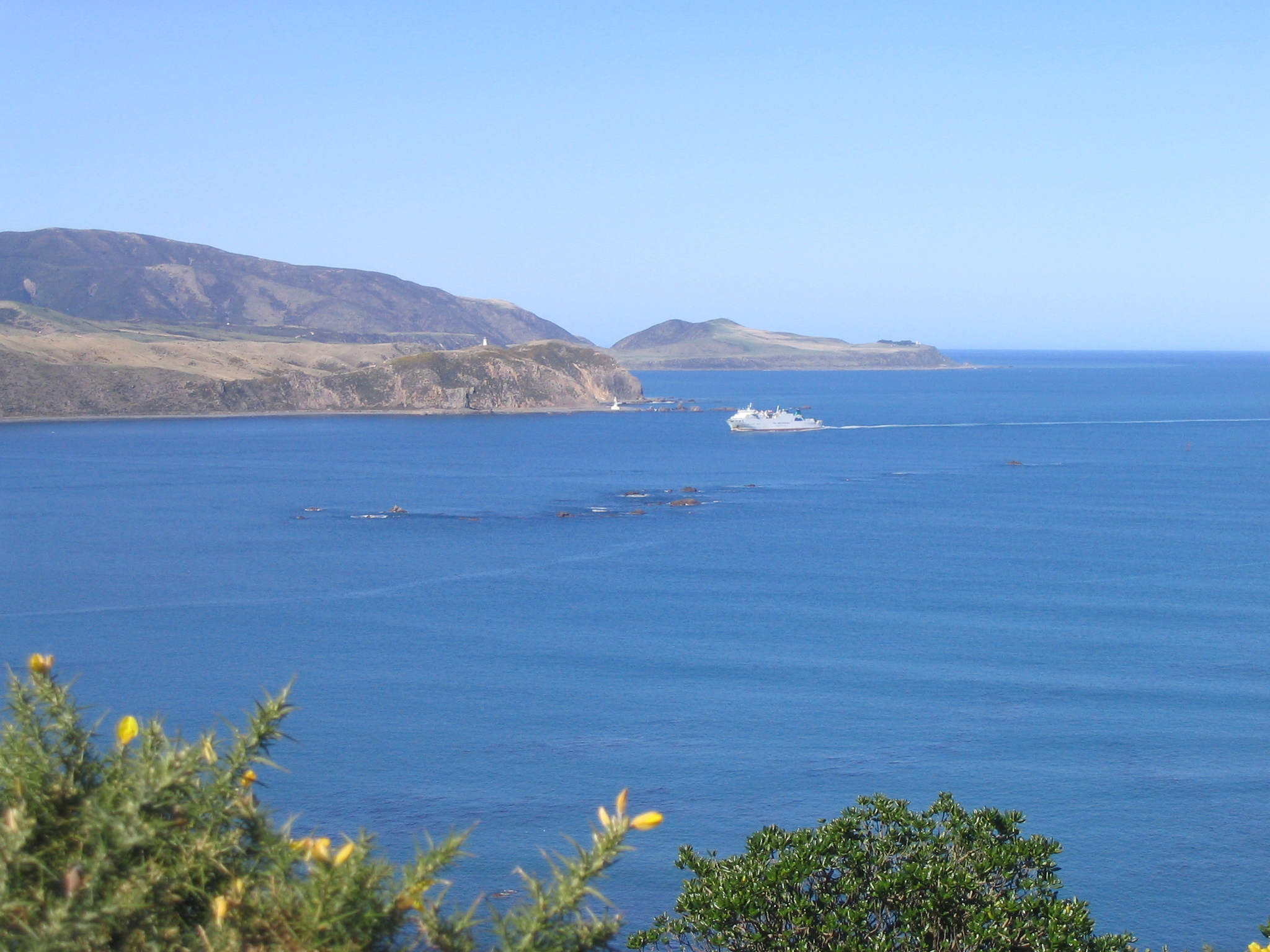
Wellington Harbour entrance showing Barrett Reef

The reef, much of which is exposed even at high tide, is located to the west of the two-kilometre-wide channel that links Cook Strait with Wellington Harbour, close to the shore of the Miramar Peninsula. The shipping channel lies between the reef and Pencarrow to the east. The area to the west between the reef and Point Dorset on the Miramar Peninsula is known as Chaffers Passage, after the captain of the Tory, a ship sent to New Zealand by the New Zealand Company in 1839. Due to the channelling effect of Cook Strait, which lies between the Pacific Ocean and the Tasman Sea, the currents are strong and fickle and gales are common. Add to this the volume of traffic which uses the shipping channel (including several crossings daily of the inter-island ferries to Picton), and it is not surprising that the reef has a lengthy roll-call of shipwrecks.

=== History of vessels damaged, stranded, or wrecked on Barrett Reef ===
- 1848 Subraon, barque, bound for Sydney on Barrett Reef. This vessel was carrying people away from Wellington on account of the Awatere valley, Marlborough earthquake (7.5) 16 Oct 1848; they were fleeing to Sydney.
- 1850 Ship, Inconstant struck Barrett Reef. The vessel was afterwards purchased by John Plimmer and used as a store, called "Plimmer's Ark," where the Bank of New Zealand (now the 'Old Bank Arcade') was later built.
- 1866 Tui, iron steamer, wrecked, north end of Barrett Reef.
- 1871 Lady Bird, schooner (3-masted), 303 tons stranded on the south end of Barrett Reef.
- 1874 Earl of South Esk, wooden barque, 336 tons. Became a total loss
- 1874 Cynthia, schooner, 63 tons. Stranded; partial loss. Abreast of north end of Barrett Reef
- 1876 Hunter, schooner, 90 tons. Stranded; total loss. Southernmost rock of Barrett Reef
- 1876 Shepherdess, schooner, 38 tons, Stranded; partial loss
- 1880 Malay, barque, en route from Newcastle. When off Barrett reef the vessel struck a rock, got off and arrived at port making a little water.
- 1882 Napier, steamer, 48 tons Barrett Reef, 8 December 1882; got off.
- 1883 Caberfeidh, barque, 333 tons, struck outer rock of Barrett Reef. She received but little injury, only a few feet of her false keel having been carried away.
- 1885 Coronilla, barque, had a narrow escape when she drifted on to the reef. Towed away by Tui.
- 1895 Wakatipu, steamer, 1258 tons, and Flora, 838 tons, collided heavily about 200 yards inside the outer rock of Barrett Reef while racing at top speed. The directors dismissed each master even though they both were credited with great skill and each had many years’ experience under his belt.
- 1897 Clansman, schooner, 157 tons stranded inside outer reef of on Barrett Reef, 6 October 1897; got off, repaired at Evans Bay Patent Slip.
- 1912 Haupiri, steamer, struck Barrett Reef in heavy rain, 17 May 1912; put back to Evans Bay and repaired.
- 1915 Corinna, steamer, 812 tons.
- 1927 Norma, fishing launch, struck Barrett Reef and sank. Retrieved from 60 feet of water by the floating crane Hikitia.
- 1933 Golden Harvest, steamer, 5644 tons, struck the rocks of Barrett reef and ran aground. Stuck fast for 24 hours, then unloaded onto lighters and retrieved by tugs Toia and Terawhiti to Jubilee Floating Dock in Wellington.
- 1936 Rangatira, inter-island ferry, 6,152 tons
- 1947 MS Wanganella, liner, 9576 tons. Stranded; refloated and repaired.
- 1968 TEV Wahine, inter-island ferry, 8,948 tons, 53 lives lost. Wrecked; complete loss.

Sources Evening Post| volume=XCIII| issue=48, 24 February 1917, Page 6 Wanganui Chronicle| issue=19883, 27 August 1913, Page 5 Evening Post| volume=CXV| issue=126, 31 May 1933, Page 10

== See also ==
- Steeple Rock
