= Ballantynes =

New Zealand department store chain

J. Ballantyne & Co. Ltd.
- Trade name: Ballantynes
- Industry: Retail
- Genre: Department stores
- Founded: 1854; 172 years ago
- Founder: Esther Clarkson
- Headquarters: Christchurch, New Zealand
- Number of locations: 3 (2025)
- Area served: Canterbury; Southland
- Key people: Jonathan Ballantyne (Managing Director)
- Owner: Ballantyne family
- Number of employees: ~300 (2025)
- Website: ballantynes.co.nz

J. Ballantyne & Co. Ltd., trading as Ballantynes is a New Zealand luxury department store chain founded in 1854. It is the oldest operating department store in New Zealand and a member of the Intercontinental Group of Department Stores.

As of 2025, Ballantynes operates three stores around the South Island of New Zealand; a flagship location in Christchurch, alongside branches in Timaru and Invercargill.

== History ==
=== Early years ===
Ballantynes traces its origins back to Dunstable House, Dunstable House was a millinery and drapery business that began in the front room of the Clarkson family residence on Cashel Street in 1854. Dunstable House was founded by Esther Clarkson and named after her hometown of Dunstable in the United Kingdom, the business began after Clarkson ordered a shipment of straw hats from her hometown and eventually expanded into drapery. A shop-building for Dunstable House was then built extending to the street front (the Clarkson residence was 40ft away from the street). David Clarkson's (the husband of Esther) cousin Thomas Atkinson entered into the business with Esther and David in 1854 and Dunstable House was briefly known as T. Atkinson & Co. Atkinson dissolved the partnership on 1 January 1857.

In 1863, Esther and David Clarkson sold the business to William Pratt, Pratt gained control of the business on 2 January 1864. Under Pratt the business expanded adding a two floor brick store building and stone store. (Note: A stone store is a small warehouse of stone. Dunstable House used its stone store for reserve stock.) In 1872, John Ballantyne purchased Dunstable House.

Ballantynes opened a London buying office in 1875.

In November 1883, the Timaru's Victoria House drapery was purchased by Ballantyne and rebranded to J. Ballantyne & Co. (though the store continued to be known internally as Victoria House, complementing Christchurch's Dunstable House). On 9 November 1883 it was announced that J. Ballantyne & Co. had been sold to Josiah Ballantyne, William Ballantyne, Thorne Ballantyne, Henry Pratt, Robert Dawson, David B. Bowie, and James R. Triggs. However, by 1904 only the Ballantyne family held stakes in the business.

The store slowly added the J. Ballantyne & Co./Ballantynes nameplate in addition to Dunstable House, with the Ballantyne name becoming more prominent over time and by the 1880s the store was referred to as J. Ballantyne & Co./Ballantynes.

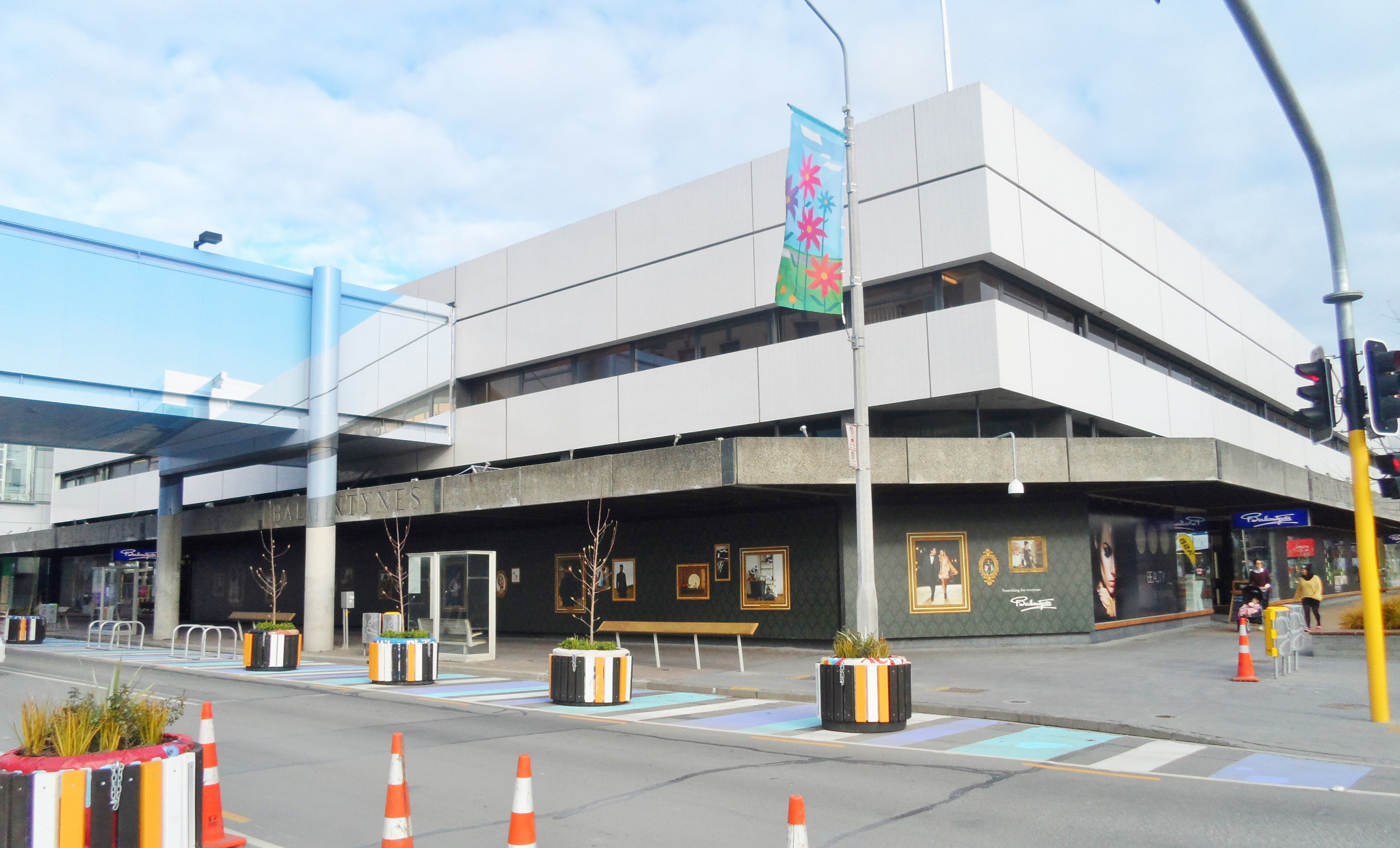
Ballantynes Christchurch on the corner of Colombo and Cashel streets

=== 20th century ===
By 1900, Ballantyne's Dunstable House had faces on Colombo Street and Lichfield Street. In 1904, a new Colombo Street facing four floor building was in the process of being erected for the store.

In May 1940, the London buying office was closed and Ballantynes London staff now operated out of the Buckley & Nunn buying office. Ballantynes buyers would continue operating from London until Buckley & Nunn was taken over by David Jones in 1979 and the office was closed. They briefly worked with Portman (Wholesale & Overseas), Ltd., however, as Portmans in London also purchased for rival firm Haywrights, Ballantynes broke away from Portmans and began ordering directly from British suppliers in July 1979.

Prior to the 1947 fire Ballantynes occupied a large site with 80 metres of street front on Cashel Street, 50 metres on Colombo Street and another 21 metres on Lichfield Street. The site covered around an acre that contained seven conjoined buildings, six of which had three or more hardwood floors that were interconnected on multiple levels by large passageways between the buildings to allow staff and customers to move freely about the store.

==== 1947 Ballantynes fire ====
On 18 November 1947 Ballantynes was razed by one of the worst fires in New Zealand’s history, resulting in the death of 41 people. In mid-afternoon, when the fire began, an estimated 250–300 people were shopping at Ballantynes, which had a staff of 458. A civic funeral was held for the victims on Sunday 23 November. Approximately 800 family and friends filled Christ Church Cathedral for the service. The funeral procession was so long that by the time the last car left Cathedral Square, the first had arrived at Ruru Lawn Cemetery in Bromley, more than 4 km away. People lined the streets along the procession’s route and approximately 10,000 attended the graveside service.

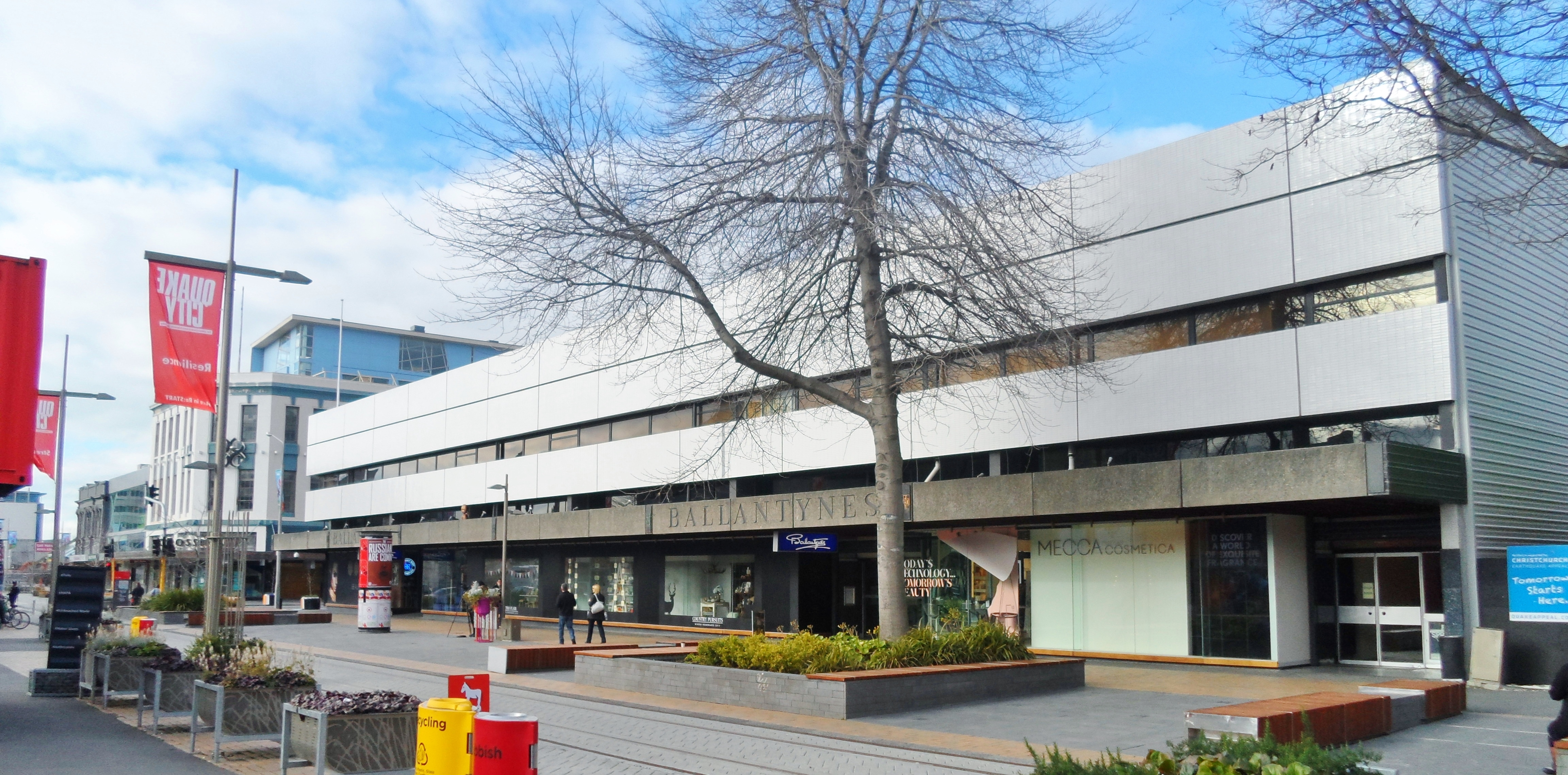
Ballantynes Christchurch from Cashel Street

A Commission of Inquiry into the fire found both Ballantynes and the fire brigade responsible for the high loss of life. Ballantynes accepted its share of responsibility. The Commission’s recommendations proved to be a catalyst for change ‘in the way public buildings safeguarded staff and customers, and in the administration of the fire brigade’. When Ballantynes reopened on the same site in temporary premises in 1948, fire alarms had been installed and a new pamphlet on safety was issued to staff. The first rule – in bold type – described how to evacuate the premises in an emergency.

==== Post-fire ====
In 1948, Ballantynes reopened in a temporary premises on the same site. The store was rebuilt in four stages and was completed in 1963, the new store was designed by Warren & Mahoney and constructed by Charles Luney.

In 1991 and 1992, respectively, D.I.C. and Kirkcaldie & Stains, approached Ballantynes in efforts to sell themselves to the company, Ballantynes declined both offers.

Following the closure of the three hotel boutiques in 1997, Ballantynes received offers to open branches within the Christchurch Arts Centre, Christchurch Gondola, Merivale, and in Christchurch suburban shopping centres, Ballantynes declined all offers.

=== 21st century ===
In 2001, it was reported that Ballantynes was being offered millions of dollars to open branch stores in Auckland shopping centres, Ballantynes declined all leasing offers.

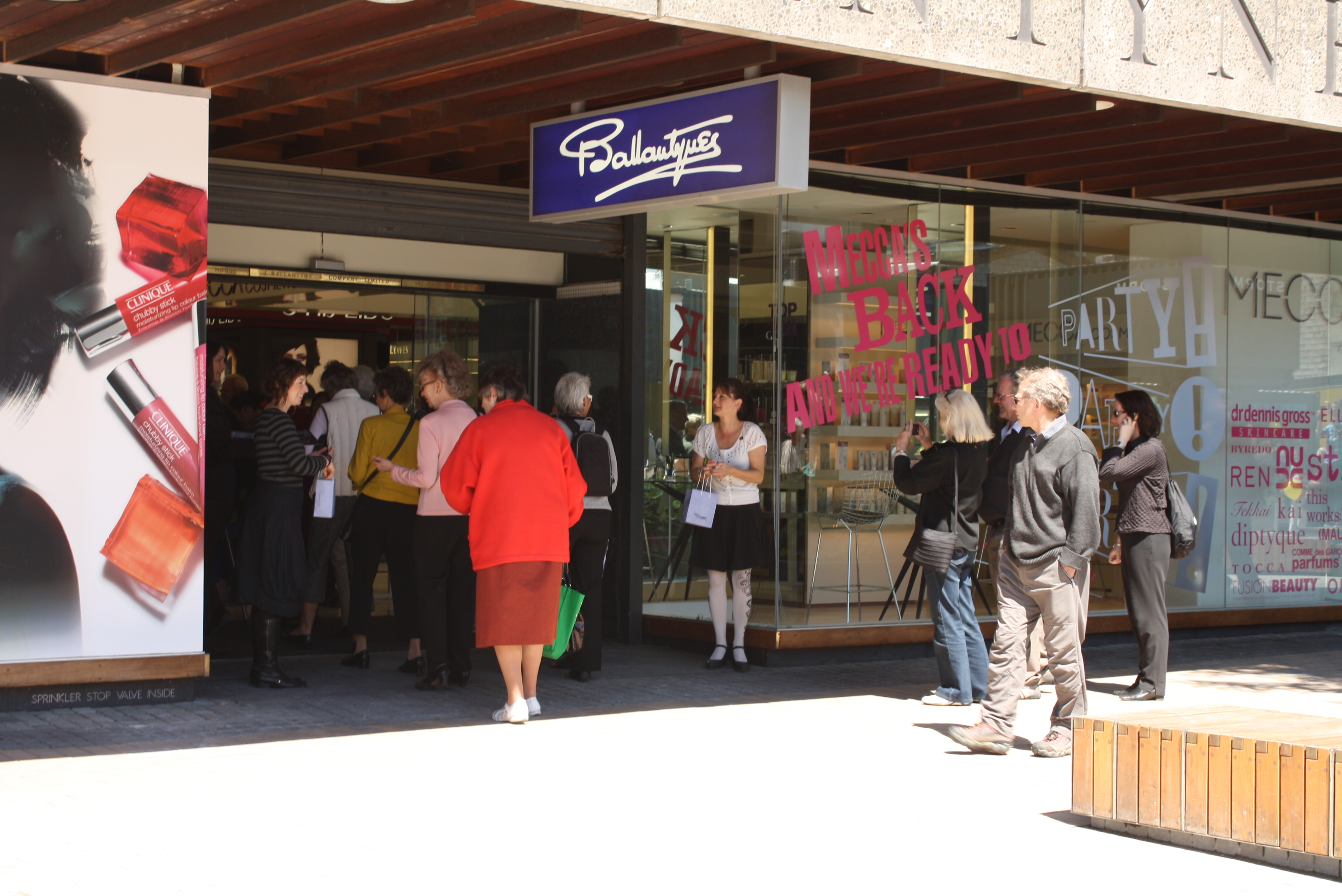
Shoppers eager to get back into Ballantynes on the reopening weekend of City Mall

==== Canterbury earthquakes ====
The Christchurch store was closed for eight months following the February 2011 earthquake. Prior to 22 February, the company employed about 395 staff across its three stores, with about 300 at the City Mall store. The relatively modern construction and low height, at only two storeys, meant it was one of few central buildings relatively undamaged in the second earthquake. The Timaru, Christchurch International Airport, and online store remained open, the flagship store was the first substantial retailer to reopen in the Christchurch CBD following the earthquakes, reopening on 29 October 2012.

==== Post-earthquake ====
In 2013, Maria O'Halloran was appointed CEO. O'Halloran resigned from her position as CEO on 23 December 2024. She was replaced by Jonathan Ballantyne in the role of Managing Director.

In February 2024, a small-format 'Ballantynes Select' branch opened in Invercargill.

One percent of the ~300 staff were laid off in November 2025, Ballantynes stated “We are confident these changes are appropriate to the circumstances facing Ballantynes and won't have any impact on how we look after our customers.”.

== Stores ==
=== Christchurch ===
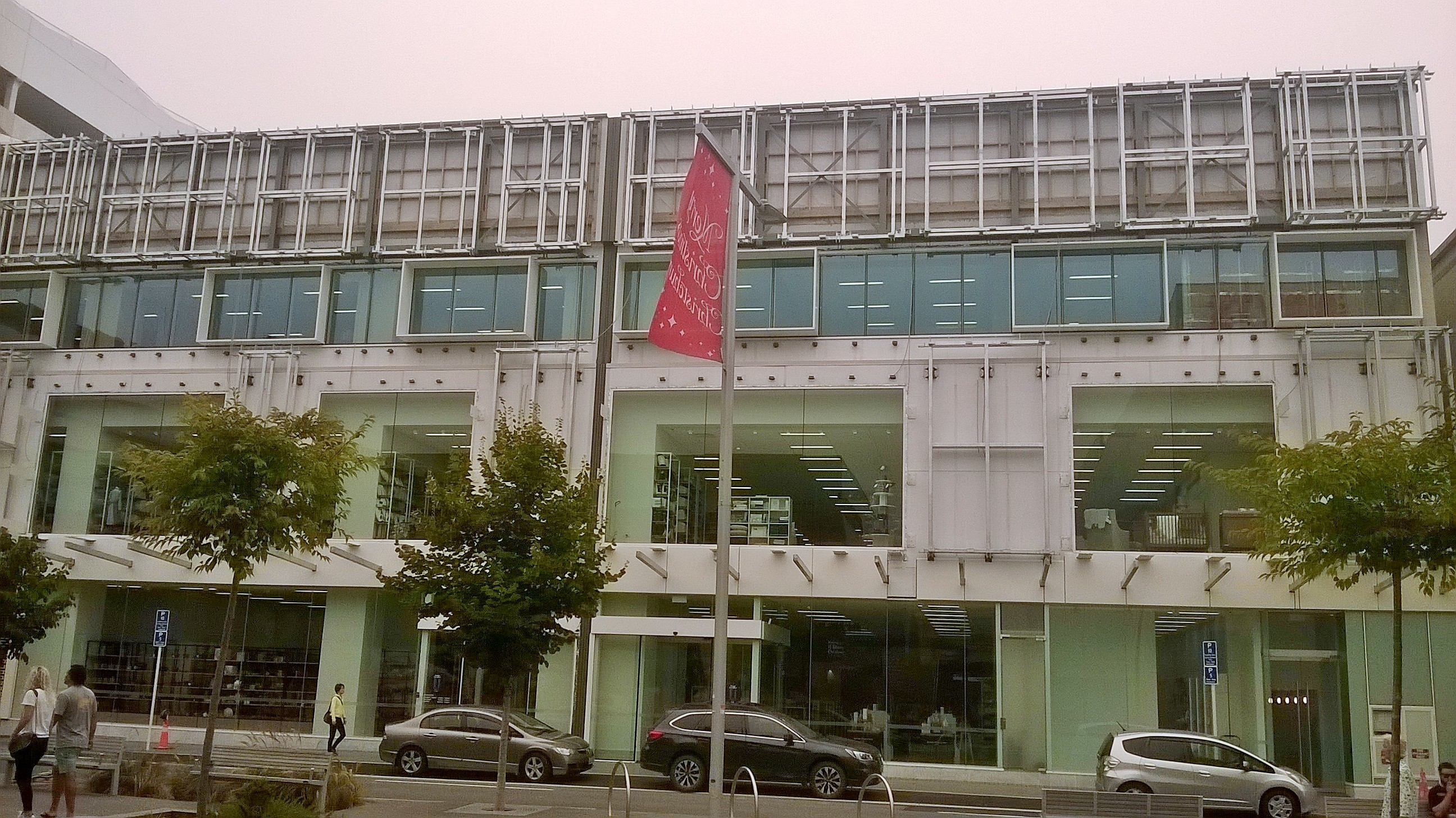
The partially completed four level Ballantynes extension at 43 Lichfield Street in 2020

The Christchurch store is located on the corner of Cashel Street and Colombo Street. The Cashel/Colombo facing building was designed by Warren and Mahoney and opened in the early 1960s. The Lichfield Street facing building was designed by Peddle Thorp and opened in 2020, replacing space lost due to the 2011 Christchurch earthquake.

Current departments include cosmetics, men's fashion, men's underwear, travel goods and luggage, accessories, pantry, Floristry, stationery and homewares. The wider homeware department encompasses china and collectables, spa collections, appliances, kitchenware, glassware, bedding, and interiors. Fashion Atrium, ladies' fashion, lingerie, and ladies' footwear are located on the first floor. The lower ground floor includes children's wear, Solace Hair and Beauty (formerly The Salon at Ballantynes), a Beauty and Events Room, Customer Service, The Registry, toilets and a parents' room.

An all-new cosmetics hall was completed by the time the store reopened in November 2012. The hall is the largest and most extensive beauty department in the South Island.

In 1950 a branch store opened at Christchurch Airport the first of its kind in New Zealand. The store closed in 2019. In the 1980s, small format branches opened at three Christchurch hotels, the Quality Inn Chateau (1988, now Chateau on the Park), Noah's (now Sheraton), and the Park Royal Hotel (now Crowne Plaza). All of these small format hotel branches were closed in 1997.

==== Contemporary Lounge ====
Contemporary Lounge was a youth-oriented fashion store featuring local and international designers. The large store was an original tenant in the Re:START container ship mall. Opening in October 2011, the large Contemporary Lounge was located next to the Christchurch store, across Cashel Street. In April 2013, Contemporary Lounge returned to 663 Colombo Street (Mid City Centre) on Ballantynes' first floor. It has since closed.

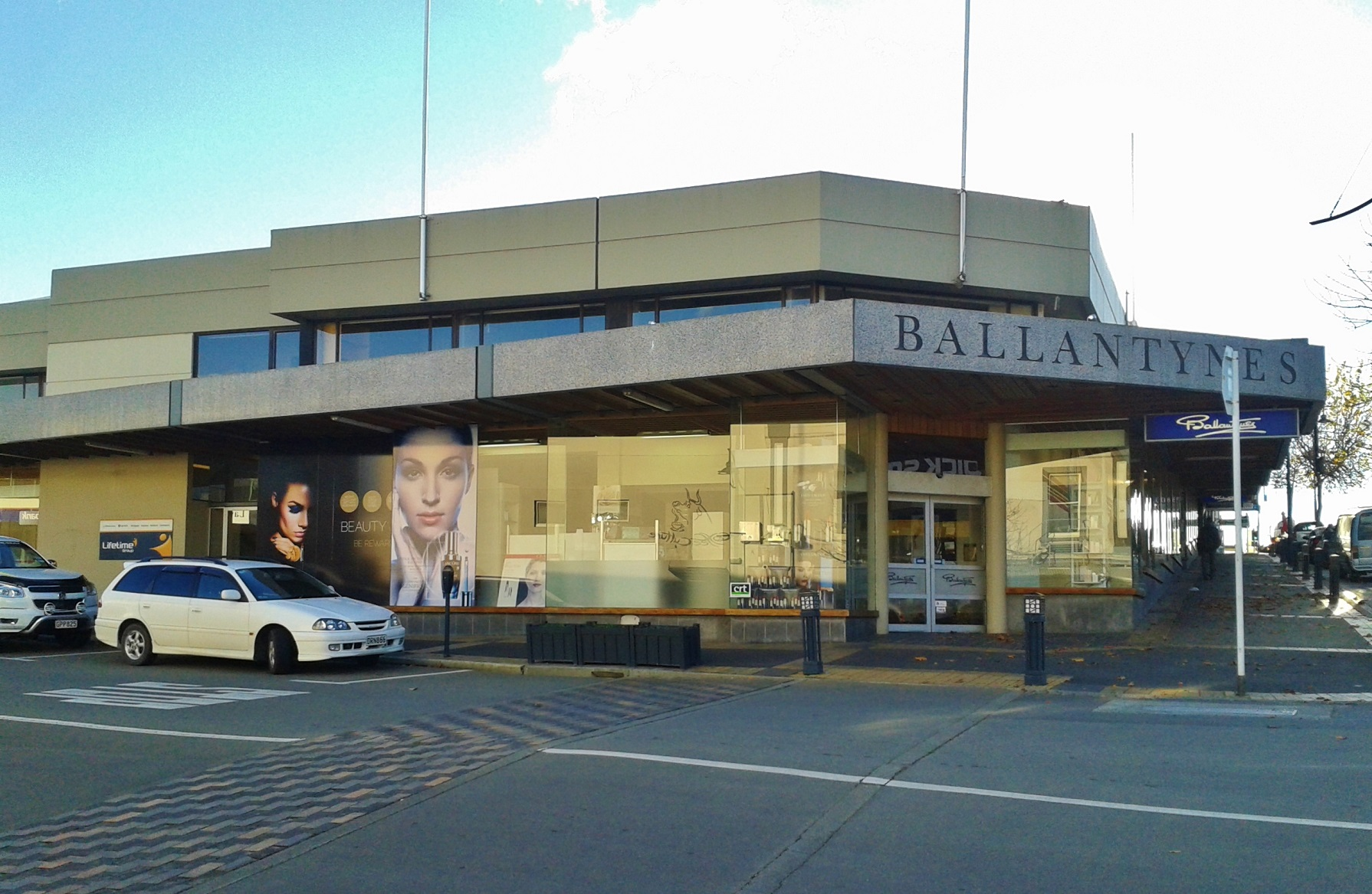
Ballantynes Timaru

=== Timaru ===
The Timaru branch was first opened in 1883, but Ballantynes has been operating from the current location since 1913. The 1913 store building was designed by Clarkson & Ballantyne architects.

From 1948, as Ballantynes begun to stop producing made-to-measure merchandise and shuttered its workrooms, attempts to redevelop the site were explored due to its large size. The three-level, Victoria House had a total area of 22,000 sq ft (2,044 m^{2}), of which 10,000 sq ft (929 m^{2}) was estimated to be required for the store. In 1964 and continuing into 1965, the interior of the store was redesigned by Miles Warren.

In 1971, a sale of the site to Fletcher was proposed, with intentions for Ballantynes to relocate further into the city centre, however, this sale never eventuated. In 1979, Fletcher proposed a redevelopment of the site into a shopping centre with Ballantynes as the anchor tenant, these plans did not eventuate. At the Christchurch headquarters proposals were being made to demolish, relocate (further into the city centre or into the suburbs), or close the store.

In 1985, the decision was made to demolish and rebuild, Warren and Mahoney designed a sloping two level store and construction began on 19 November 1985. The new store opened in October 1986 and was rechristened as 'Timaru House'.

Retail kiosks once operated at Timaru Airport, Timaru Information Centre, and on the waterfront for visiting cruise ships.

=== Invercargill ===
On 29 February 2024, Ballantynes Select was opened in Invercargill, the store is small format and the first Ballantynes outside of Canterbury.

=== Seasalt Cornwall ===
Ballantynes partnered with Seasalt Cornwall (a British high street brand) to open its first international store store at Milford Centre in Auckland in August 2023. A second branch was later opened at the Barrington Shopping Centre in Christchurch.

== Other services ==
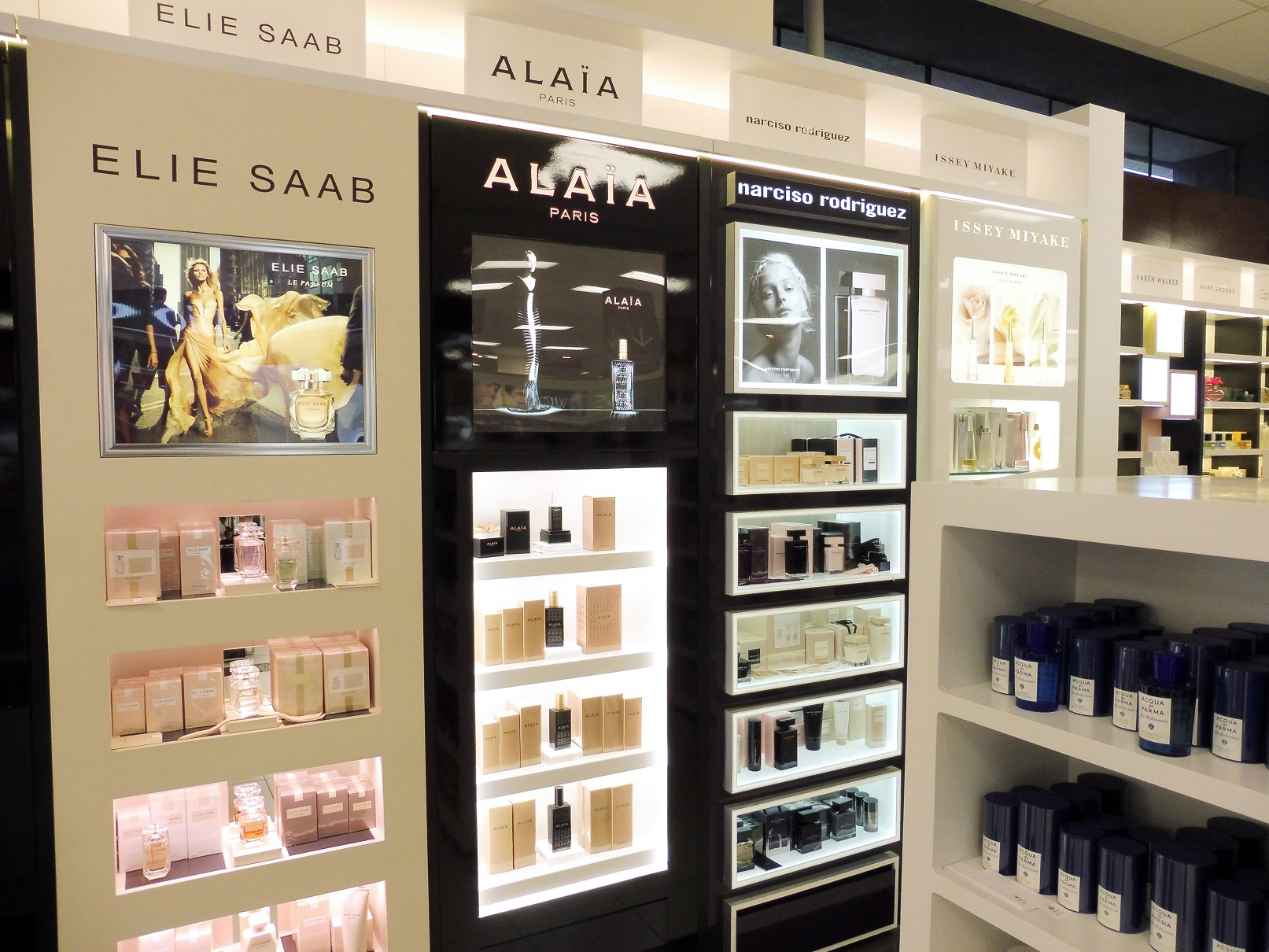
Perfume display in the beauty department

Not including The Pantry gourmet food department in Christchurch, Ballantynes operates three food outlets. The Tearooms are found on the lower ground floor of the Christchurch store. Kin Bistro and Winebar is on the ground floor and JB's Café is located at the Timaru branch.

The Christchurch store also offers a range of services, including 'Ballantynes by Appointment' personal shopping, Gift Registry, 'The Workroom' alterations and nationwide and international delivery. Ballantynes offers finance in the form of the Ballantynes Card store account card. Gift cards are also available. Ballantynes also offers extensive online shopping on its website. In mid-2012, Ballantynes launched Beauty VIP, a rewards programme for cosmetics in the Christchurch and Timaru stores, and at Solace Hair and Beauty in the Christchurch store.

== See also ==
- Smith & Caughey's
- Kirkcaldie & Stains
- Arthur Barnett
- H & J Smith
- Farmers
