= Thomas Turnbull (architect) =

New Zealand architect

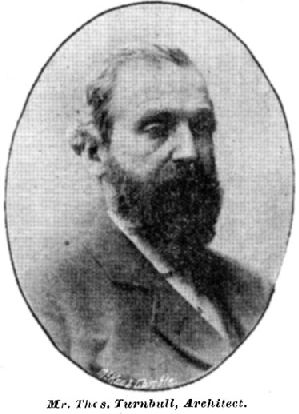
- Born: 23 August 1824; Glasgow, Scotland
- Died: 23 February 1907 (aged 82); Wellington, New Zealand
- Occupation: Architect
- Practice: Thomas Turnbull & Son
- Buildings: St John's Church, New Zealand Parliamentary Library and Old Bank Arcade

Thomas Turnbull (1824–1907) was a New Zealand architect. Turnbull was born in Scotland and articled to various practices in Britain before establishing his own practice in Melbourne. Turnbull later moved to San Francisco until discontent with the profession in America lead him to move and work in New Zealand. In New Zealand Turnbull designed over 300 buildings, primarily around Wellington but also in the Wairarapa, New Plymouth, Nelson, and Blenheim. Many of his surviving works have heritage registration with his most notable building being the General Assembly Library.

== Early life ==
Thomas Turnbull was born in Glasgow, Lanarkshire, Scotland on 23 August 1824.

After finishing school Turnbull was articled to a carpenter, his cousin, to help him learn about construction. The intention was always for Turnbull to get into architecture and not carpentry. Turnbull then worked as a draughtsman in David Bryce's Edinburgh office. Turnbull later worked as clerk of works for F & G Holme in Liverpool.

== Architectural career ==
Turnbull moved to Melbourne in 1851 and worked as an architect in the surrounding Victorian gold mining towns. Then in 1861 he moved to San Francisco, going into partnership with firstly, A H Jordan, and then with Thomas England, taking over the business in 1869 when England died. During his time in San Francisco Turnbull designed several prominent buildings including the first Cliff House (1863), Trinity Church and the Market Street Presbyterian Church. After a large earthquake in 1868, local architects formed the Architectural Association of San Francisco and held a conference to discuss how to build to resist earthquakes. Turnbull became the association's secretary. In 1869 Turnbull designed a large building of four storeys plus a basement and an attic for H H Bancroft & Co, a printing company. The building was brick with an iron front and floors bolted with long iron rods. The San Francisco Chronicle reported:

"The style of architecture will be entirely different from any other building in this city.[...] Every precaution has been made to procure the best material and erect the structure in a manner which will render it as thoroughly earthquake-proof as possible."

Turnbull moved to New Zealand in 1871 due to the pressure of the American architectural profession and settled in Wellington. He worked for a year for the government's Colonial Architect William Clayton before setting up his own practice. Turnbull's services were in demand due to his history of practice in earthquake-prone California. Turnbull was Wellington Education Board architect and designed several schools in this role.

Turnbull maintained his interest in earthquake-proofing buildings after his arrival in New Zealand. In 1888 he presented a paper at the Philosophical Society in Wellington, asserting that masonry buildings properly constructed with good bricks and mortar, reinforced with iron built into the walls and joists fitted with wrought-iron anchors, would survive a large earthquake.

Turnbull was a member of the Wellington City Council in 1891, became the first president of the Wellington Association of Architects in 1892, and was a member of the Board of Examiners for the Royal Sanitary Institute in January 1907. He designed three of the four buildings which make up the Old Bank Arcade, St John's Church and St Peter's Church in Willis Street, Wesley Methodist Church in Taranaki Street as well as many other commercial premises in Wellington.

Turnbull's son, William Turnbull, joined his practice in 1891 after his father's death in 1907 William took over the practice and operated as Thomas Turnbull & Son.

== Personal life ==
Turnbull had a substantial library and upon his death his collection primarily went to Alexander Turnbull. (Note: The two men are unrelated despite the shared surname)

Turnbull died in 1907, survived by his wife and five children.

== List of works ==
building	location	image	date	notes
St Mary's Church	Whanganui		1877	Demolished 1973, with its stained glass windows and other features incorporated into a new church.
St Mary's Church	Carterton		1878	The church was built in 1878 in south Carterton. The spire was about 23 m (75 ft) high. In 1904 the church was moved in two pieces to a new site further north at the corner of High Street and King Street, taking over three weeks to make the move. Flying buttresses were added in 1907 as the church had settled a bit on its new site. In 1932 the church was moved across King Street, had its spire removed and was turned into a social hall for the church. A new concrete church was built in its place.
St Mary's Church	Blenheim		1878	Heritage New Zealand Historic Place Category 1
Imperial Opera House	Wellington, 71 – 77 Manners St		1878	The Imperial Opera House was built for the Te Aro Theatre Company in 1878 but was destroyed in a huge fire only a year later. Another opera house was built on the same site in 1886, and was in turn replaced by the current Opera House opened in 1914.
Wellington Corporation offices	Wellington, corner of Brandon and Featherston Streets		1878	Demolished.
St Patrick's Church	Masterton		1879	Heritage New Zealand Historic Place Category 2
St Peter's Church	Wellington, Willis Street		1879	Heritage New Zealand Historic Place Category 1
Wesley Church	Wellington, Taranaki Street	Wesley Church at night	1879	Heritage New Zealand Historic Place Category 1
Sacred Heart Church	Greytown	Sacred Heart Church, Greytown	1880	To be deconsecrated in 2023. A plaque on the wall of the church states that it is identical to St Joseph's catholic church at Tinui, which was later shifted to Riversdale.
St Mary's Church	Nelson		1882	Heritage New Zealand Historic Place Category 2
Bank of New Zealand Building No. 3	Wellington, Customhouse Quay		1883	Heritage New Zealand Historic Place Category 1. Built for National Mutual Life Association. Now forms part of the Old Bank Arcade.
Post & Telegraph building	Wellington, Customhouse Quay		1884	When it was built, this was the largest brick building in New Zealand, and it featured earthquake proofing. "The wood floors are so far independent of the main walls that the two materials may vibrate at different rates without any structural strain. The walls are also so constructed in sectional courses, and these courses are so bound and interlocked with bands of pliable wrought Iron, that a severe shake of the earth would fail to crack the hard shell with any serious result." However the building had to be replaced when it was almost completely destroyed by fire in April 1887.
St John's Church	Wellington, Willis Street		1885	Heritage New Zealand Historic Place Category 1.
Gear Meat Freezing Works	Petone		1891	Two storeyed building built for the freezing department of the works. Demolished.
former Woolworths building	Wellington, corner of Dixon & Cuba Streets		1886	Originally known as Te Aro House, and from 1928 as Burlington Arcade. From 1951 until ca 1990 this was a Woolworths store. The façade has been retained and incorporated into the Te Auaha complex.
former City Meat Company building	Wellington, Stewart Dawson's Corner		1896	Heritage New Zealand Historic Place Category 2. Façade retained and incorporated into new building.
Kirkcaldie & Stains	Wellington, Lambton Quay		1897	"Each of the three iron columns in the front of the premises weighs 3½ tons, and rests on blocks of bluestone obtained from Footscray, Victoria, that have a total weight of eight tons. The stone in the centre of the building weighs just four tons. The girder which is to be supported by the three columns is 64ft long, and weighs about 11 tons." Opened in 1898. Heritage New Zealand Historic Place Category 2. The 1897 building was the middle section of the frontage, later altered. Façade retained and incorporated into new building.
Wellington Gas Company building	Wellington, Courtenay Place		1898	Heritage New Zealand Historic Place Category 2.
Parliamentary Library	Wellington, Molesworth Street		1899	Heritage New Zealand Historic Place Category 1. Turnbull's 3-storey design for the General Assembly Library (now known as the Parliamentary Library) was not completed because of rising costs, and it was finished with only two floors by John Campbell in 1899.
Bank of New Zealand Building No. 1	Wellington, Lambton Quay		1899	Heritage New Zealand Historic Place Category 1. Now part of the Old Bank Arcade.
Bank of New Zealand Building no. 2	Wellington, Lambton Quay		1904	Heritage New Zealand Historic Place Category 2. Now part of the Old Bank Arcade. This building was designed by the firm of Thomas Turnbull and Son, rather than Thomas Turnbull himself, who was probably retired by this time.
