= Kirkcaldie & Stains =

Former department store in Wellington, New Zealand

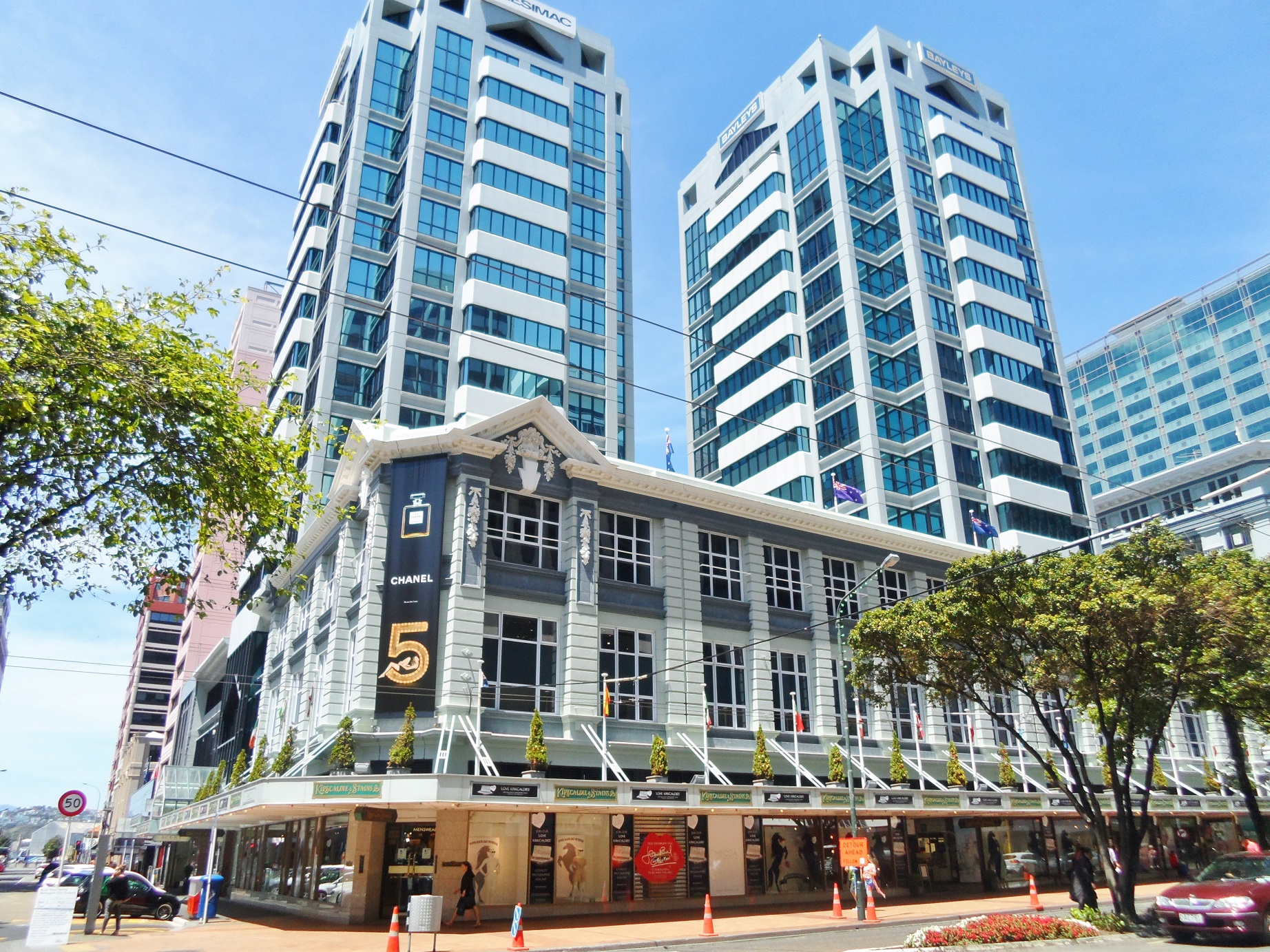
- Type: Public listed company
- Traded as: NZX: KRK
- Industry: Retail
- Founded: 1863; 163 years ago
- Founder: Robert Stains
- Defunct: 2016; 10 years ago
- Headquarters: Wellington
- Key people: Falcon Clouston (Chairman)
- Products: apparel, cosmetics, homewares
- Number of employees: 300 plus
- Website: www.kirkcaldies.co.nz

Kirkcaldie & Stains (known informally as Kirkcaldie's or Kirks) was a department store in Wellington, New Zealand. It was established in 1863 by John Kirkcaldie and Robert Stains with a capital of £700. The first store was opened on Lambton Quay. In 1868 Kirkcaldie & Stains moved to its final location at the corner of Lambton Quay and Brandon Street, expanding several times. There was a branch on Cuba Street, Wellington, from 1870 –1876 and one in Napier from 1897 until 1917.

Kirkcaldie & Stains announced on 4 June 2015 that the store would close in January 2016, when the site, after a multi-million dollar refit, would become a David Jones department store. Shareholders approved the plan on 31 July 2015 in a special meeting. The store closed on 16 January 2016. The main store on Lambton Quay reopened as 'David Jones Wellington', a branch of Australian department store chain David Jones, on 28 July 2016. David Jones closed on 12 June 2022.

== Establishment ==
The business was founded in 1863 by Scotsman John Kirkcaldie, who had been apprenticed as a draper, and Englishman Robert Stains, who had a retail trade background. The men met in Sydney, Australia, and decided to pool their capital to establish a business in New Zealand. They settled on Wellington as the place, and their first store, 16 feet (4.8 metres) square was the hulk of the wrecked ship Inconstant, known as Plimmer's Ark, at Lambton Quay. Kirkcaldie & Stains opened for business in 'Waterloo House' on 9 December 1863, selling women's and men's clothing and accessories, mourning wear, drapery, manchester and haberdashery. In 1865 extensive additions were made to the store.

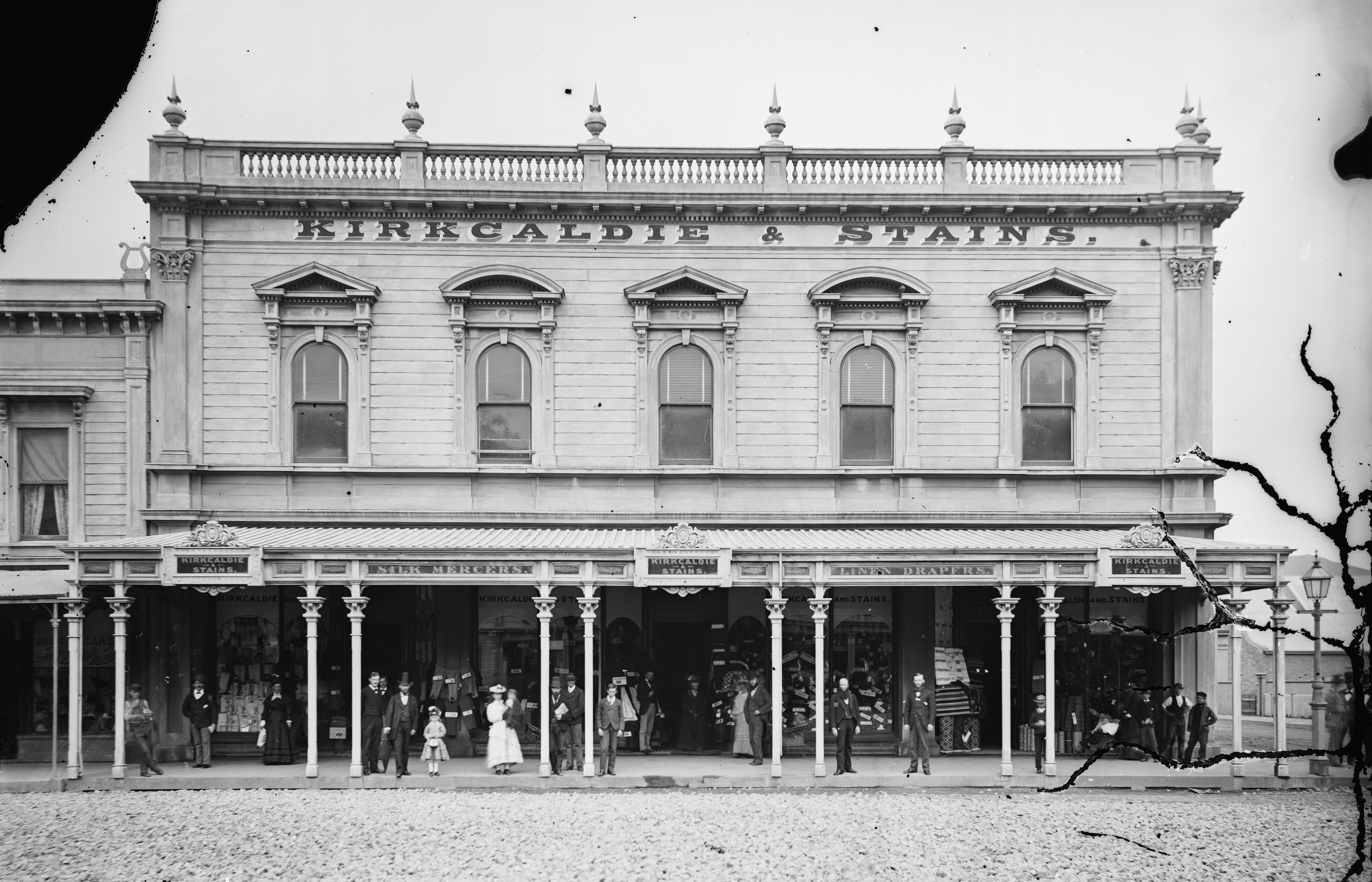
1868 wooden shop on Lambton Quay.

In 1868 the business moved to new premises on land reclaimed from the harbour, at the corner of Lambton Quay and Brandon Streets. This site was part of the block of land occupied by the business until 2016. The two-storey wooden building in Italianate style was designed by Charles Julius Toxward and opened on 24 October 1868. John's brother Robert was employed in 1868 as its London buyer.

Between 1870 and 1876, Kirkcaldie & Stains also operated a branch store in Cuba Street, Wellington. In the nineteenth century official currency was in short supply, so about 50 firms around New Zealand, including Kirkcaldie & Stains, issued their own tokens for use as payment. Kirkcaldie & Stains issued copper tokens in halfpenny and penny denominations in the 1870s.

The partnership was dissolved in 1886 when Robert Stains returned to England. Stains died in London in 1912. The business remained in the Kirkcaldie family until the 1930s.

== Expansion, 1897–1930s ==
In January 1897, Kirkcaldie & Stains opened its only store outside of Wellington, taking over the drapery business of Neal & Close in Napier. It sold the business in 1917, and thereafter remained a single-location business until 2014.

In July 1897, Kirkcaldie & Stains announced it would extend its Wellington business by constructing a new three-storey brick building on Lambton Quay, adjoining its 1868 wooden premises. The new building was designed by Thomas Turnbull and featured electric lighting, an Otis hydraulic lift, 3000 feet of Lamson tubes (pneumatic cash-carrying pipes) and the largest tea room in the city. Departments in the store at this period included drapery, mercery, clothing, mantles, millinery, accessories, ladies' underclothing, furnishings and floor coverings. The top floor was a workshop or factory for dressmaking and tailoring, and there was a large basement for inwards goods. Part of Kirkcaldie & Stains' success at this time came from postal orders: the company sent out illustrated seasonal catalogues and received 15,000 to 20,000 orders each year from customers outside of Wellington.

A sensational incident occurred in the tea room in 1898. As the manager, Ellen Dick, came out of the kitchen, one of the customers drew a large six-chamber revolver from under her cloak and fired at her. Mrs Dick was struck just under the rib cage on her left side, and ran into the kitchen as the assailant fired two more shots. The assailant, Annie McWilliam, then ran down the stairs but was stopped by the store manager, Mr Teasdale, and Sidney Kirkcaldie (John Kirkcaldie's son). Ellen Dick was not greatly injured by the shooting because the bullet had bounced off her corset: the doctor who attended her said that a man shot in the same spot would have been killed. McWilliam was later sentenced to seven years in prison.

Kirkcaldie & Stains was registered as a private company under the Companies Act 1882, on 26 July 1899.

Kirkcaldie & Stains expanded further during 1901–1902, building a new brick four-storey building in Brandon Street behind its 1868 wooden building, on the site of Wellington's first fire station. The fire station bell was rung in store for emergencies and for staff closing time until 1952, and was then donated in 1954 to the Wellington Fire Board. The building was designed in an Italianate style by William Turnbull, the façade forming the basis of the style for which Kirkcaldie's was famous.

The company bought the Occidental Hotel property on the corner of Lambton Quay and Johnston Street, and began a major extension project. The first stage was a four-storey warehouse built in 1907 in Johnston Street on the site of the house of Dr Claud Dawson Henry. The building was again designed by William Turnbull. It was constructed of reinforced concrete and was possibly the first building in New Zealand to be built of that material. Sidney Kirkcaldie stated that concrete would be more earthquake- and fire-resistant than brick. Fire was an ever-present danger in early Wellington, which had many wooden buildings built close together. In 1887, a major fire had destroyed a city block between Panama Street, Lambton Quay, Featherston Street and Brandon Street, and sparks blew across to Kirkcaldie & Stains' 1868 wooden building. The building was saved by men placing wet blankets on its roof. In December 1904, a fire in Kirkcaldie's mattress warehouse destroyed £500 of stock, and a month later in January 1905 another large fire destroyed the D.I.C. department store block between Panama Street, Lambton Quay and Brandon Street. Waves of flames carried across Brandon Street, setting fire to the original Kirkcaldie & Stains wooden building, but were extinguished before taking hold.

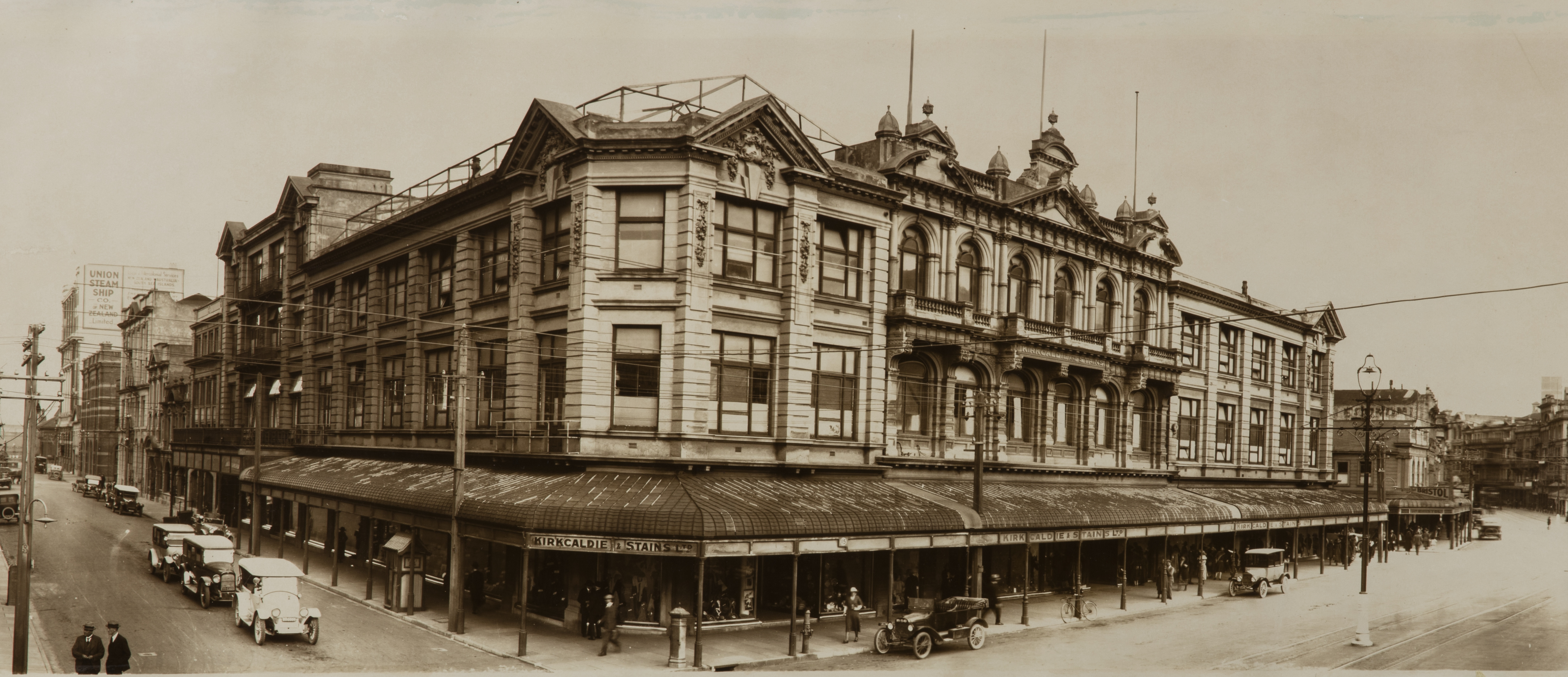
Kirkcaldie & Stains in 1923, showing the central building, built in 1897, before it was remodeled to match the façade on each side.

In 1908–1909, the next phase of the expansion took place when Kirkcaldie & Stains built a three-storey building on the Occidental Hotel site at the corner of Lambton Quay and Johnston Street. The building was constructed of reinforced concrete and featured a flat roof for parking delivery vehicles. In 1909–1910, the 1868 wooden building at the corner of Lambton Quay and Brandon Street was replaced with a three-storey building of reinforced concrete. The store now occupied a street frontage from Johnston street, around Lambton Quay to Brandon street. Four of the five buildings that made up the Kirkcaldie & Stains operation were now in the Italianate style designed by William Turnbull.

During 1927–1928, Kirkcaldie & Stains remodeled the 1897 building on Lambton Quay in the Italianate style, unifying the façade that stretched from Johnston Street to Brandon Street.

In 1931, the Kirkcaldie family sold the business to British Overseas Stores, an organisation with retail stores around the world.

== 1950–2000 ==
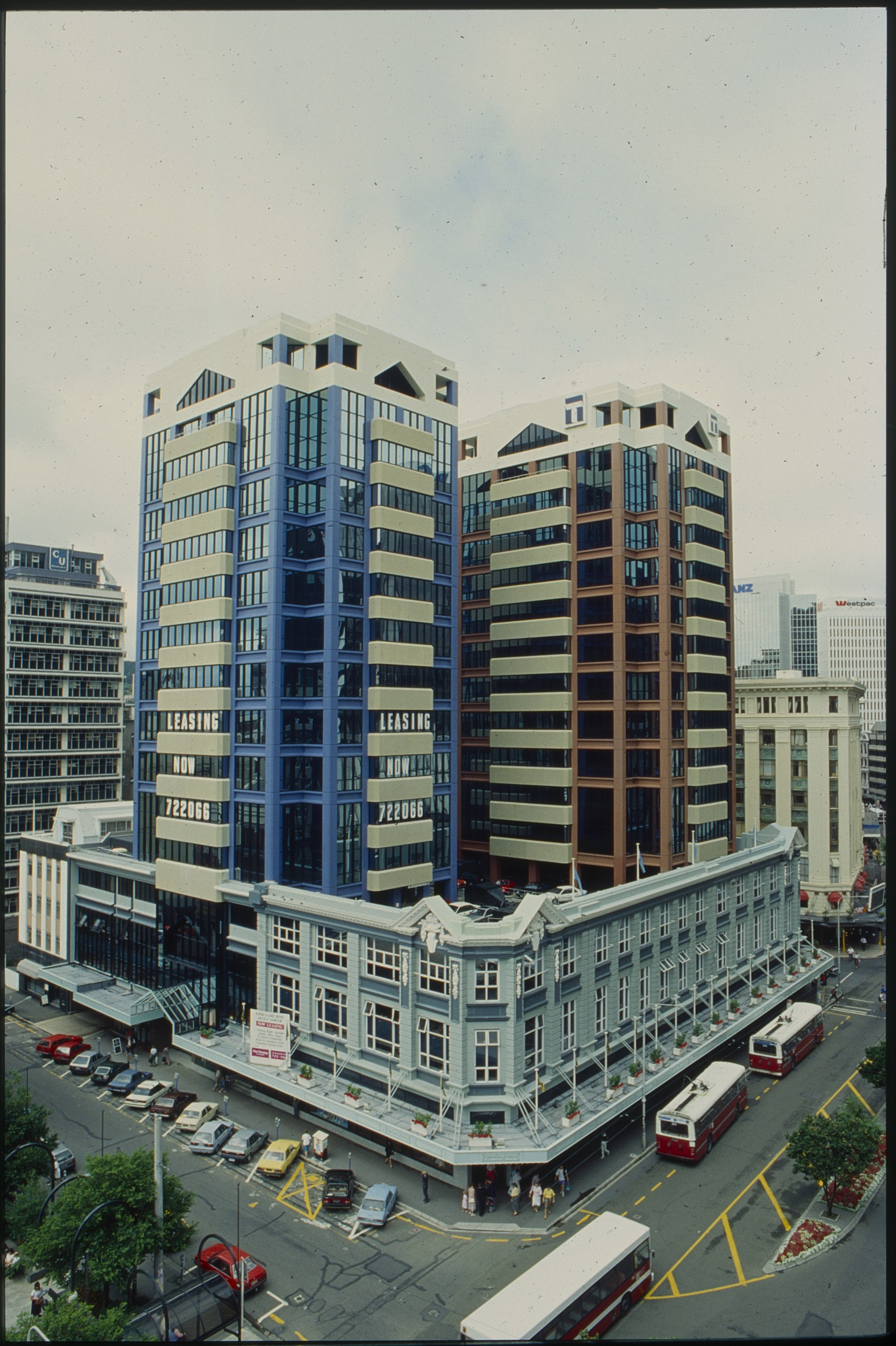
1990, showing the new towers behind the façade.

In 1951, Kirkcaldie & Stains undertook drastic changes to the interior of the store, modernising departments, upgrading stairwells and installing two lifts. Further improvements were made in 1958–1959 on the first floor to provide extra space for the fashion department, as off-the-peg garments were becoming increasingly popular.

The company celebrated 100 years in business in 1963 with window displays telling "Our story in Fashion", special lighting and a gallery of fairy tale and nursery characters along the verandah at the front of the shop. Similar celebrations were held in 1973 and 1983. In 1993, there was a large birthday cake containing $64,000 in prizes. There was a parade with a banner which read: "Kirkcaldie & Stains – a tradition in Wellington since 1863".

In 1985, British Overseas Stores sold the property to Renouf Corporation (later Hellaby Holdings). The historic façade was retained but the building behind it was demolished and replaced with a new three-storey department store topped by a car park. During the reconstruction period, half of the building closed for demolition while trading continued in the other half and some nearby rental space. Then that half of the building was demolished while trading moved to the newly built section. The brass Lamson tubes that had carried cash through the building for almost 80 years were repurposed as hand rails on the staircases in the new store. The rest of the site was redeveloped, involving the construction of two 13-storey office towers on top of the three-storey podium extending to the rear of the shop premises. The project was completed in 1989. It was one of the first developments in Wellington where a new building was constructed while retaining a historic façade, and it was not considered particularly successful from an architectural point of view. In 1993, the New Zealand Historic Places Trust (now Heritage New Zealand) downgraded the building's classification due to the changed presentation of the façade. As of 2023, it has Category 2 Historic Place classification.

Hellaby Holdings sold its shares in Kirkcaldie & Stains between 1995 and 1998, mostly to customers and staff of the store.

== 21st century ==
In 2000, Kirkcaldie & Stains released a book on the history of the company, Kirkcaldie & Stains, A Wellington Story by Julia Millen (ISBN 1 877242 071). The company set up a website in 2001, but did not offer online shopping until 2013.

Kirkcaldie & Stains had offered company shares to the public since 1995 on the secondary or unlisted market, but in May 2001 it listed on the NZX stock exchange. At that time there were five million shares on issue, mostly to staff and customers of the store. In December 2001, the company bought the Harbour City Centre retail centre, which was formerly the D.I.C. department store. It spent $6 million earthquake strengthening the Harbour City Centre, but sold it in September 2014, saying that growth in online shopping had made the extra retail space unnecessary.

The new managing director John Milford reorganized the retail side of the company in 2006, but between 2008 and 2015 the retail side of the business made a loss.

In 2012 and 2013, the store won 'Department Store of the Year' in the Roy Morgan Customer Satisfaction Awards, and in 2013, Kirkcaldie & Stains celebrated 150 years in retail with a street parade and a display of the history of the store. In August 2013, Kirkcaldie & Stains ended the 25-year-long practice of having a pianist play a grand piano in the store, saying the space was needed for fashion brands and piano music no longer fit the store's ambience. The grand piano was donated to the New Zealand School of Dance.

The company opened an interiors branch on Thorndon Quay in June 2014, but in June 2015 the company announced it would cease business in January 2016, and the interiors store closed in October 2015.

Kirkcaldie & Stains closed its doors for the last time on 16 January 2016. The main store, Lambton Quay lease and the Kirkcaldie & Stains name were purchased by Australian department store chain David Jones and after a complete renovation, including the addition of air conditioning and escalators, the building reopened as 'David Jones Wellington' on 28 July 2016. David Jones closed on 12 June 2022.

== Summer and winter sales ==
In July 1887, Kirkcaldie & Stains held its first semi-annual clearance sale. The summer and winter sales became a popular tradition, with shoppers even making special trips from towns around the North Island. The sales continued to be held until the business closed in 2016.

== Christmas at Kirkcaldie's ==
Kirkcaldie & Stains was well-known for its Christmas celebrations. From the early 20th century, there was an in-store Father Christmas for children to visit. From 1988, a special department opened within the store for a period before Christmas each year. The 'Christmas Shop' sold artificial Christmas trees, decorations, crackers and other items. Kirkcaldie's also decorated its windows and front of the store with elaborate Christmas displays. After the business closed memorabilia, including animatronic Christmas elves from the window displays, were donated to Wellington Museum.

== Managing directors / chief executives ==
From	To	Name	Notes
1902	1908	John Kirkcaldie	Retired 1918, died 1925, aged 87.
1908	1919	Sidney Kirkcaldie	Son of John Kirkcaldie. Died 1943.
1919	1931	Charles Francis Smith	
1931	1933	James Crosser	
1933	1951	Charles Morris	
1951	1962	Alfred Beuth	Received the Knighthood of the Order of Merit of the Republic of Italy in 1957, for fostering trade relations with Italy.
1962	1985	John Barr	
1985	1994	Peter Hansen	Oversaw demolition and reconstruction of the building.
1994	2001	Philip Shewell	
2001	2006	Richard Holden	
2006	2014	John Milford	
2015	2016	Philip Shewell	acting Managing Director

== Gallery ==
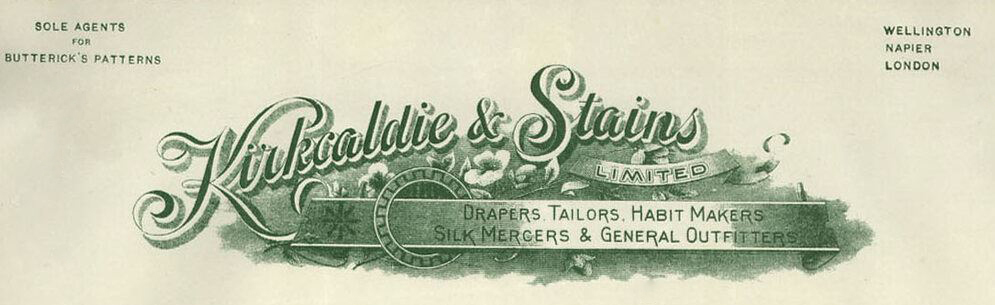
1915 letterhead of Kirkcaldie & Stains

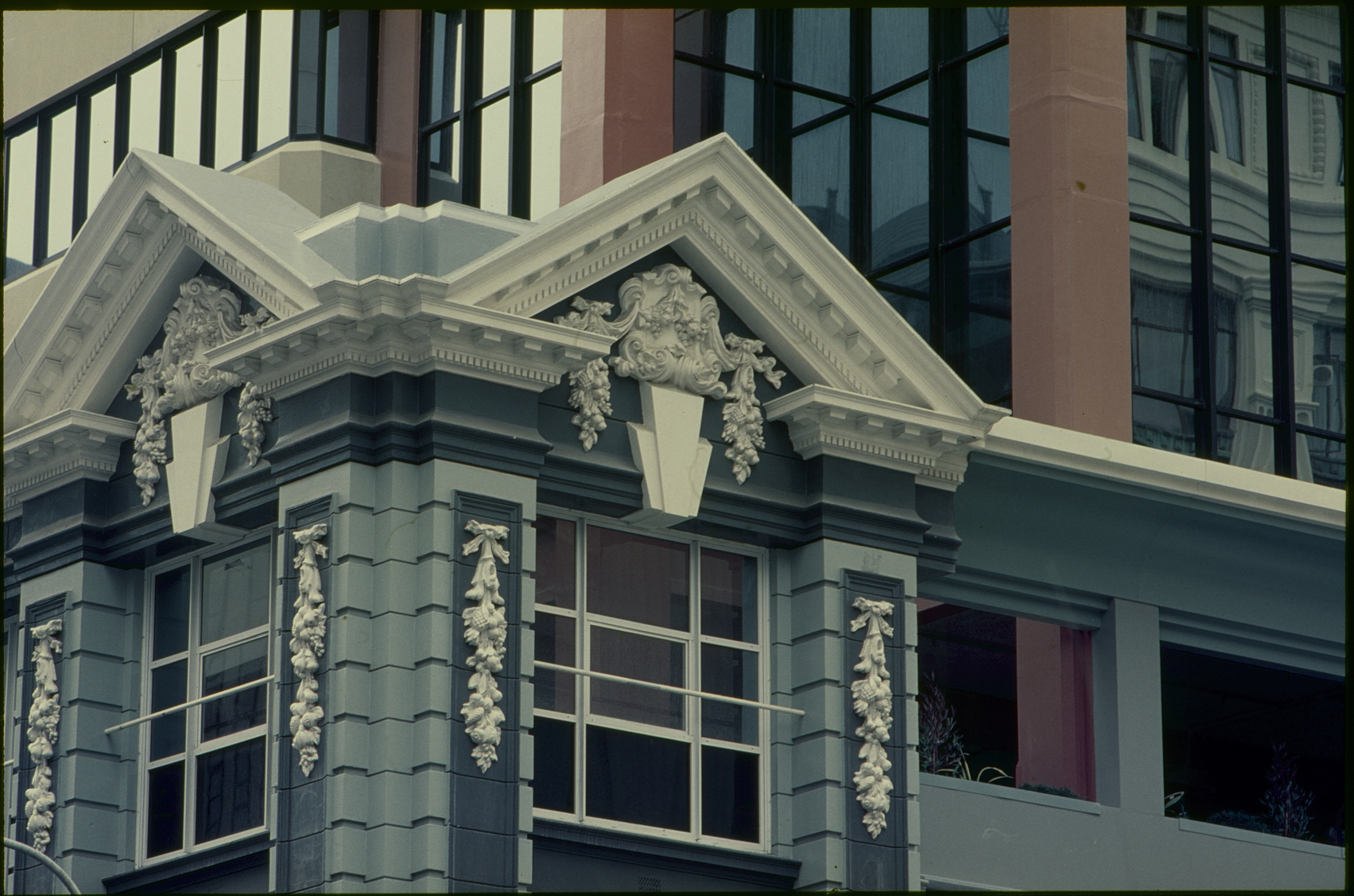
Detail of façade, with tower visible through the windows

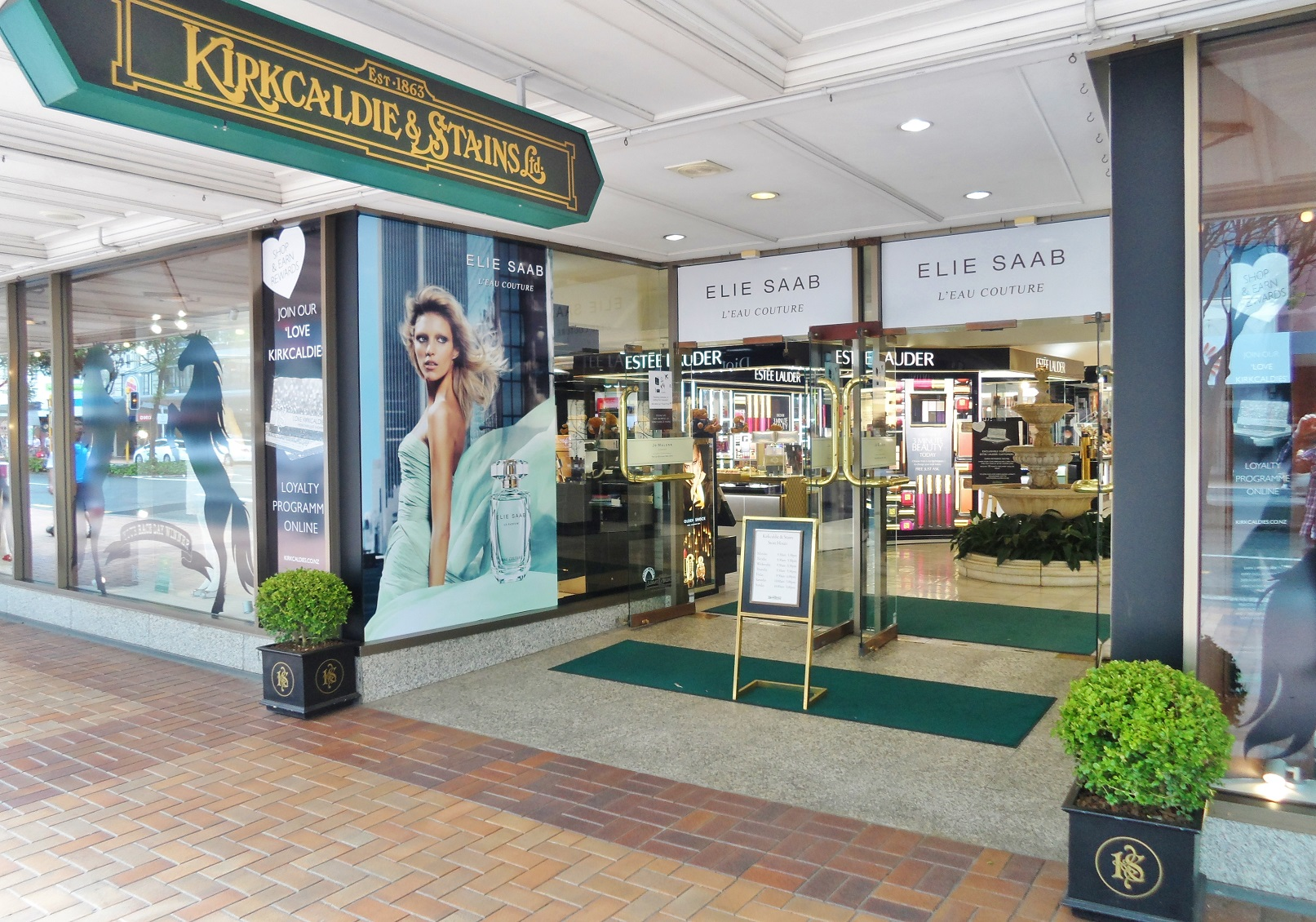
Main entrance, Lambton Quay

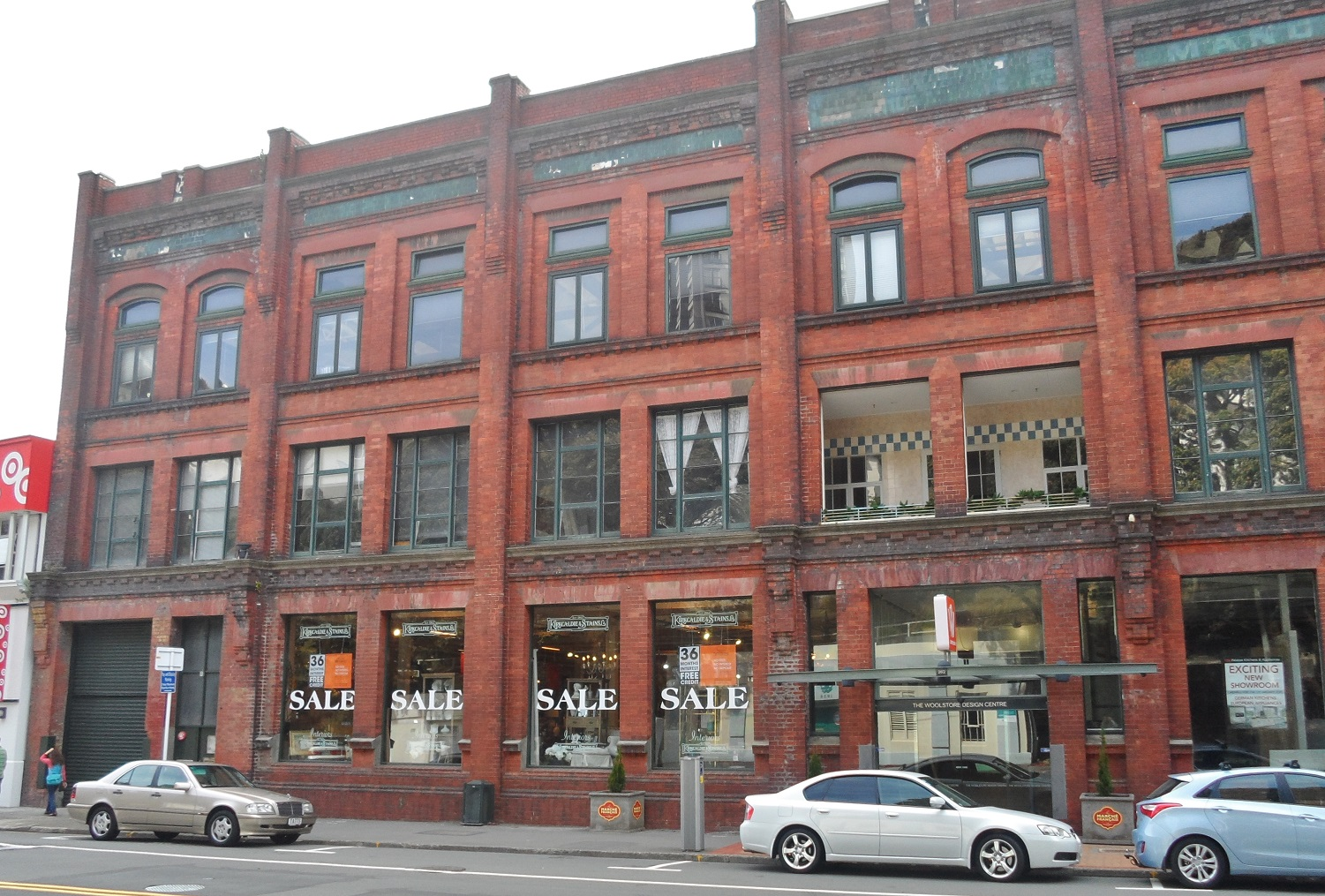
Kirkcaldie & Stains Interiors, Thorndon Quay

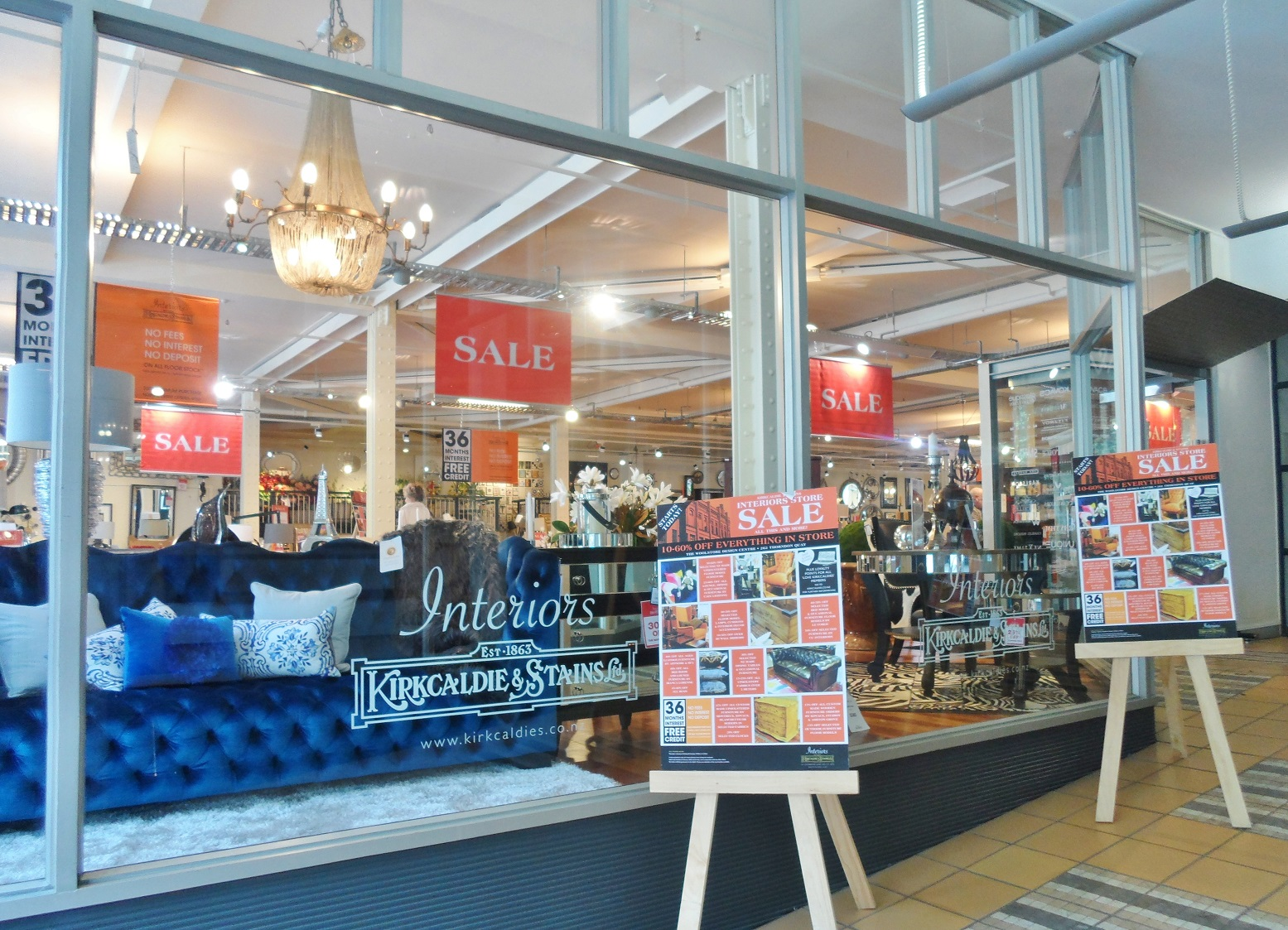
Interiors entrance

== See also ==
- Smith & Caughey's
- Ballantynes
- Arthur Barnett
- H & J Smith
- Farmers
