= St John's Church, Wellington =

Historic church in Wellington, New Zealand

St John's Church
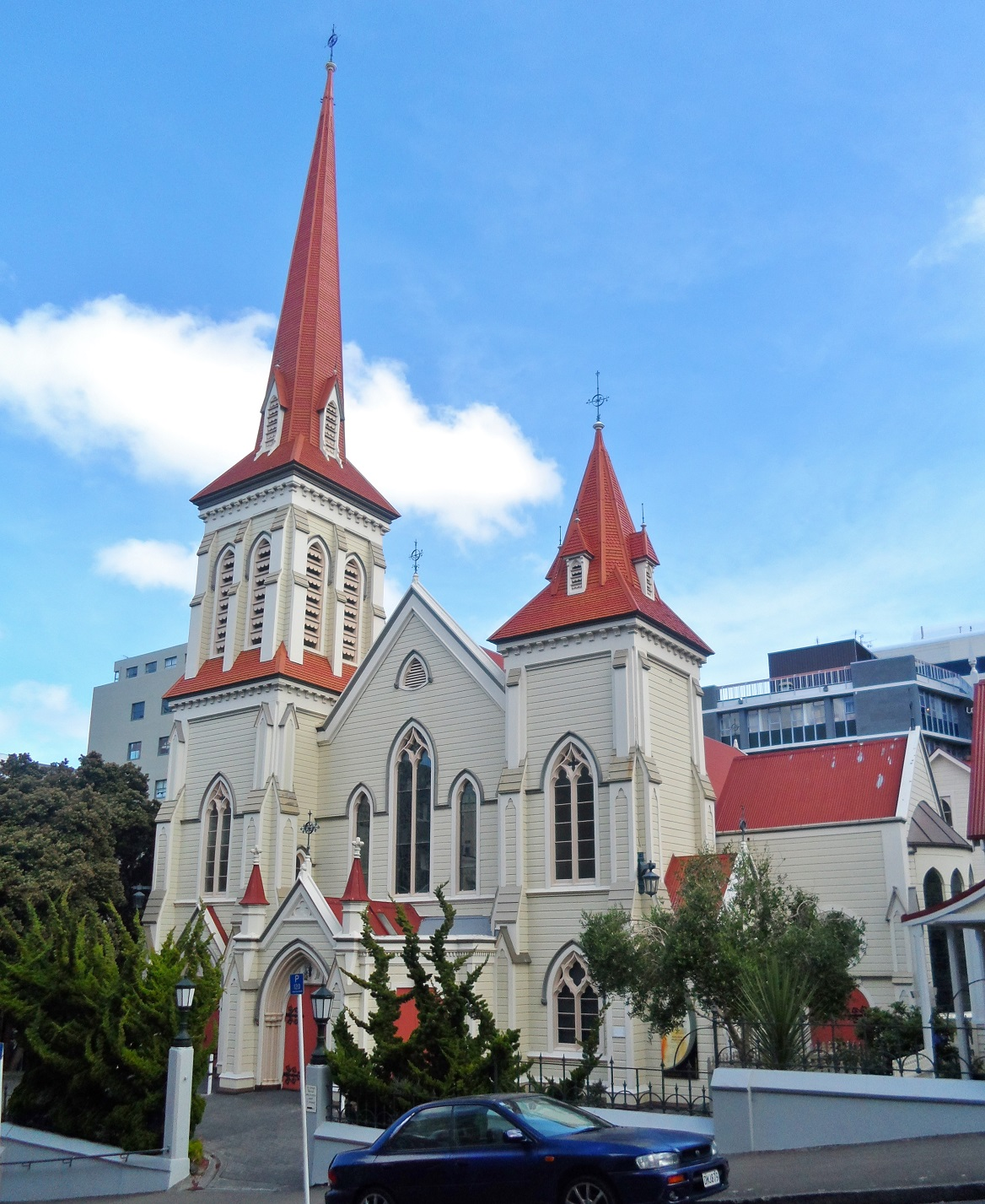
- St John's Presbyterian Church in 2015
- St John's Church
- 41°17′27″S 174°46′24″E
- Location: 166–176 Willis Street, Wellington
- Country: New Zealand
- Denomination: Presbyterian

History
- Dedicated: 11 December 1885

Architecture
- Architect: Thomas Turnbull
- Style: Gothic architecture
- Years built: 1885

Heritage New Zealand – Category 1
- Designated: 18 March 1982
- Reference no.: 228

St John's Church in Willis Street, Wellington, New Zealand, is registered by Heritage New Zealand as a Category 1 Historic Place. Designed by Thomas Turnbull, it opened on 11 December 1885 to replace an earlier church destroyed by fire in 1884. It was registered as a historic place on 18 March 1982, with registration number 228.

The church was built in kauri, totara and rimu by James Wilson. When new in 1885 it could seat 540 people, plus 240 in the gallery. A bell was installed in the spire, and supposedly would be able to be heard at Petone beach if the wind was right. Alterations were made to the church in 1904, and in 1953 Malcolm Bennie designed a porch as a memorial commemorating the centennial of the church. The church celebrated its 150th anniversary in 2003. The church had earthquake-strengthening done in 2013.
