= New Zealand Parliamentary Library =

Parliamentary Library
- Te Whare Pukapuka o te Paremata (Māori)
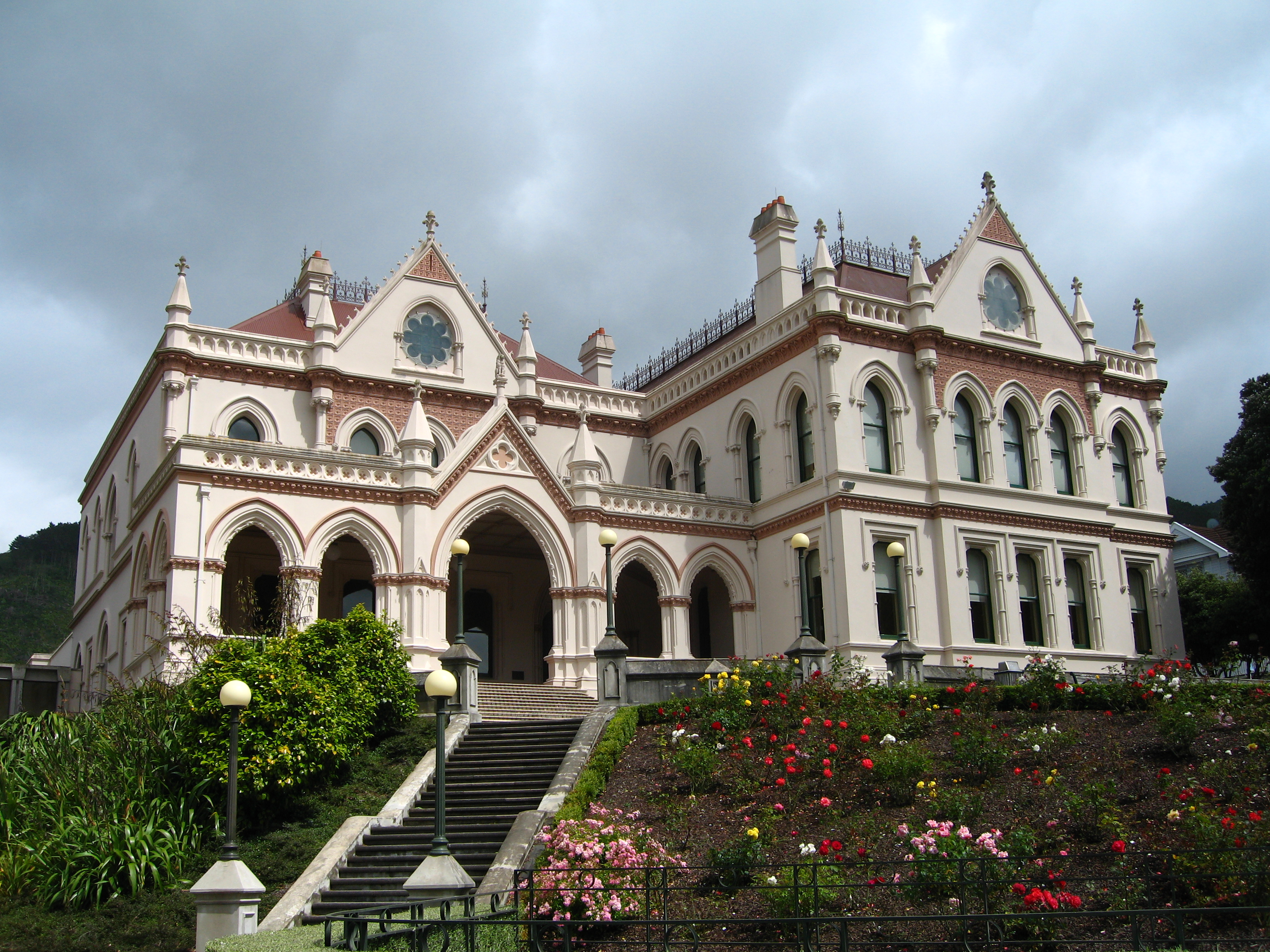
- The Parliamentary Library building in 2006
- Interactive map of the Parliamentary Library area
- Former names: General Assembly Library (until 1985)

General information
- Type: Library
- Architectural style: Gothic Revival
- Location: Wellington, New Zealand
- Coordinates: 41.27723°S 174.77666°E
- Construction started: 1897
- Completed: 1899

Technical details
- Structural system: Brick

Design and construction
- Architects: Thomas Turnbull; John Campbell

Heritage New Zealand – Category 1
- Designated: 20 July 1989
- Reference no.: 217

References
- NZHP website

The New Zealand Parliamentary Library (Māori: Te Whare Pukapuka o te Paremata), known until 1985 as the General Assembly Library, is the library and information resource of the New Zealand Parliament. The present building that houses the library was completed in 1899; it survived a fire that destroyed the rest of the General Assembly building in 1907.

== History of the library to 1965 ==
The first General Assembly Library was housed in a small room shared with the Auckland Provincial Council. It contained 750 volumes in 1860. The library then moved to a cottage behind Parliament's main building, and the collection grew to 4000 books. After Parliament moved to Wellington in 1862, some books were sent down on a ship, the White Swan, which was wrecked on the Wairarapa coast. Many parliamentary papers and reference books of the inchoate library were lost. The library also lost its accounts in the wreck. Premier William Fox, most of his Cabinet and government officials were on board, but there were no deaths. However, the order to jettison cases of papers and books in an effort to right the ship after it struck a reef, caused those cases to be swept into the Pacific. They were never seen again, despite pleas for their return. In subsequent years, it became common to blame the wreck of the White Swan for failure to produce documents which it was "thought inexpedient to produce". The library then moved to six large rooms behind Parliament in Wellington.

The earliest catalogue was an author catalogue published in 1867 (8vo, pp. 213). The next was a classified catalogue, published in 1872, the library then contained 8,700 volumes. In 1875, an elaborately classified catalogue of 11,450 books was compiled by Ewan McColl (8vo, pp. 351). In 1880, the library contained 18,562 works, and by 1897 it held close to 40,000 volumes.

It was New Zealand's finest library and source of overseas ideas, philosophy and literature for representatives and staff. Premier and poet Alfred Domett supported access for some non-parliamentarians, although the offering of this privilege had its opponents at different times. The writer Katherine Mansfield had borrowing privileges when parliament was not in session, accessing books by Heinrich Heine, Nietzsche, a translation of Bushido by Dr Inazo Nitobe, the English poets, Ibsen, Maeterlinck, and a book on the psychology of women.

The General Assembly Library continued to grow throughout the twentieth century. When, in 1965, it became one of the three bases of the newly formed National Library, it continued to function in the same bipartite manner, as parliamentary service and wide-ranging resource of international thought, art and literature. During 1965 to 1985 the international part of the library expanded significantly as a well-funded core element of the National Library. When the parliamentary activities of the Library were isolated and newly identified as Parliamentary Library, the international library, begun with allocation of funds in 1856, fell into neglect within the National Library, resulting in a 2018 directive of the Minister responsible for the former General Assembly/National Library approving "the removal of all overseas publications from the Overseas Published Collections, excluding those in subject areas identified as collecting priorities in the Overseas Collecting Plan, and in alignment with the 2015 National Library Collections Policy. A large part of the National Library's international collection is therefore the legacy of the General Assembly Library, and its disposal has become highly contentious within New Zealand and overseas.

== Services and separate identity ==
In 1966 the General Assembly Library became by law a founding entity of the new tripartite National Library of New Zealand; much of the library's collection (close to half a million volumes) was moved to various National Library locations, while certain texts inseparable from parliament's functioning remained in the Gothic building. In 1985, the General Assembly Library distinguished its function, becoming henceforth, the "New Zealand Parliamentary Library", and left the National Library to become part of the newly-formed Parliamentary Service. In so doing, it left its wide-ranging "non-parliamentary" collection in the guardianship of the National Library.

The Parliamentary Library is now solely an information repository and research service for members of Parliament and parliamentary staff. Access to the building is generally restricted to those on parliamentary business, although research publications produced are available to the public.

== The Parliamentary Library Building ==
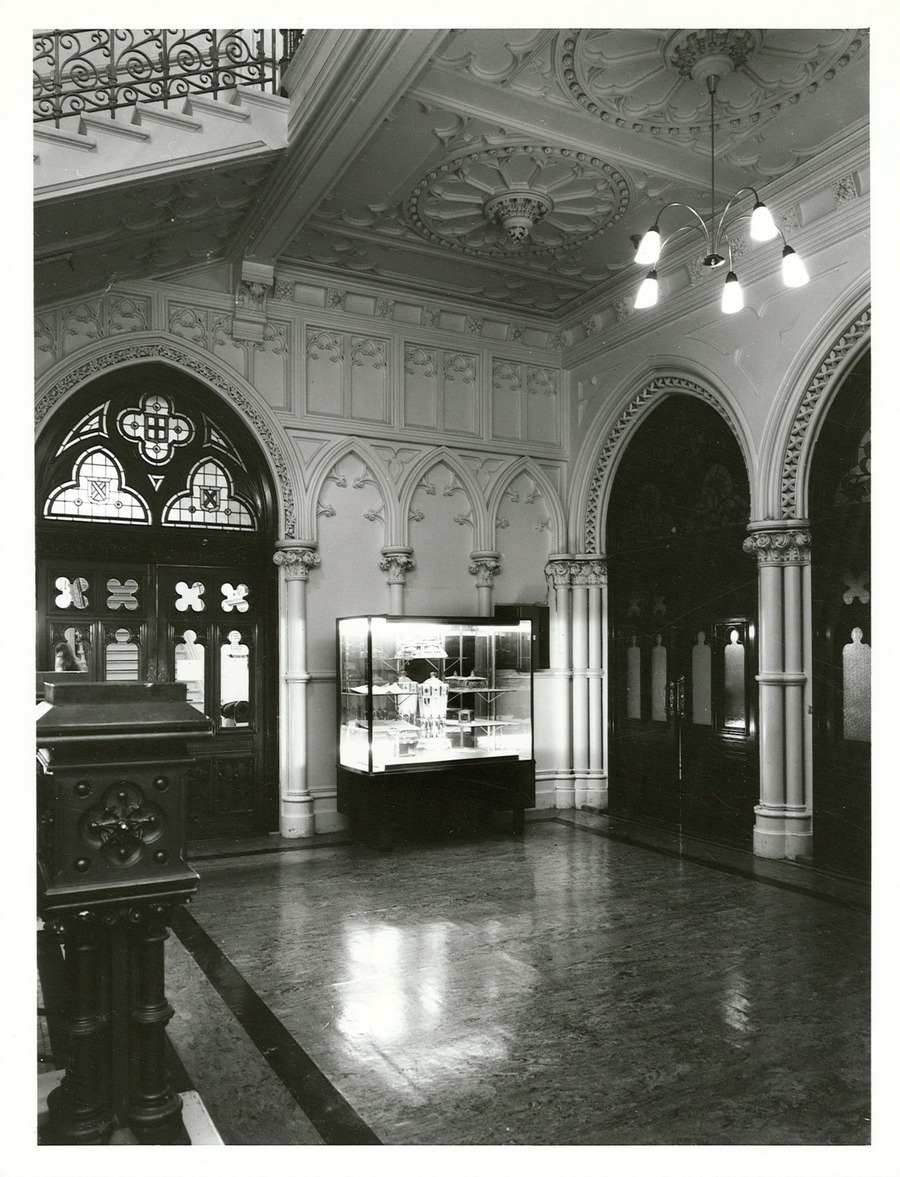
Library vestibule, 1979

=== 1899 construction of General Assembly Library Building ===
The current building occupied by the Parliamentary Library in Wellington was completed for the General Assembly Library in 1899. It is the oldest of the extant buildings in the Parliament complex. It stands to the north of Parliament House (to its right, looking from the front). The library was originally designed as a three-storey building by Thomas Turnbull in Gothic Revival style. It was fire resistant, being constructed of brick made at Mount Cook gaol with an iron firedoor separating the then General Assembly Library from the main entrance section. The third storey of the design was not built to save money (costs had reached £50,000) and it was completed by the government architect John Campbell. He redesigned the parapets, gables and roof to take account of the building's reduced height. Turnbull dissociated himself from the entire project and asked for his name to be removed from the foundation stone.

The fireproofing saved the General Assembly Library from the fire of 1907, which destroyed the rest of the wooden parliament buildings. (Coincidentally, the same happened in Ottawa, Canada, in 1916—with fire doors saving the Library of Parliament when the Centre Block of the Canadian Parliament burned.)

=== 1990s refurbishment ===
Like Parliament House, the building was strengthened and refurbished between 1993 and 1995. The building design was replicated to match the original designs. The ornate main foyer, which was damaged by another fire in 1992, was refurbished. The Gothic elements of the roof, including ironwork, turrets, and finials, were recreated. The original iron door (that saved the General Assembly Library in 1907) was restored.

The building was registered on 7th July 1989 by Heritage New Zealand (formerly New Zealand Historic Places Trust) as a Category 1 heritage structure with registration number 217.

== Gallery ==
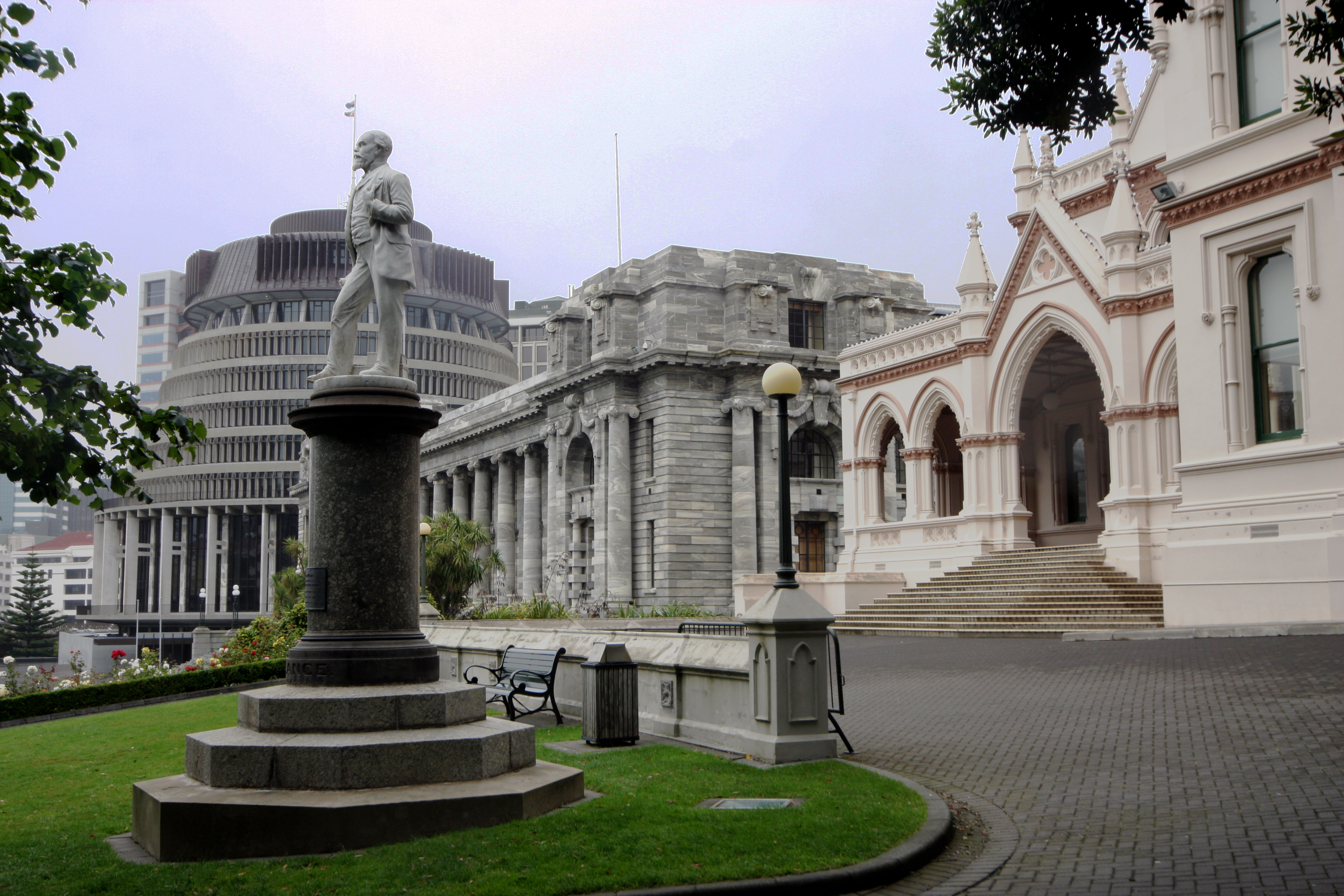
Statue of Premier John Ballance, Parliament (background), and Library

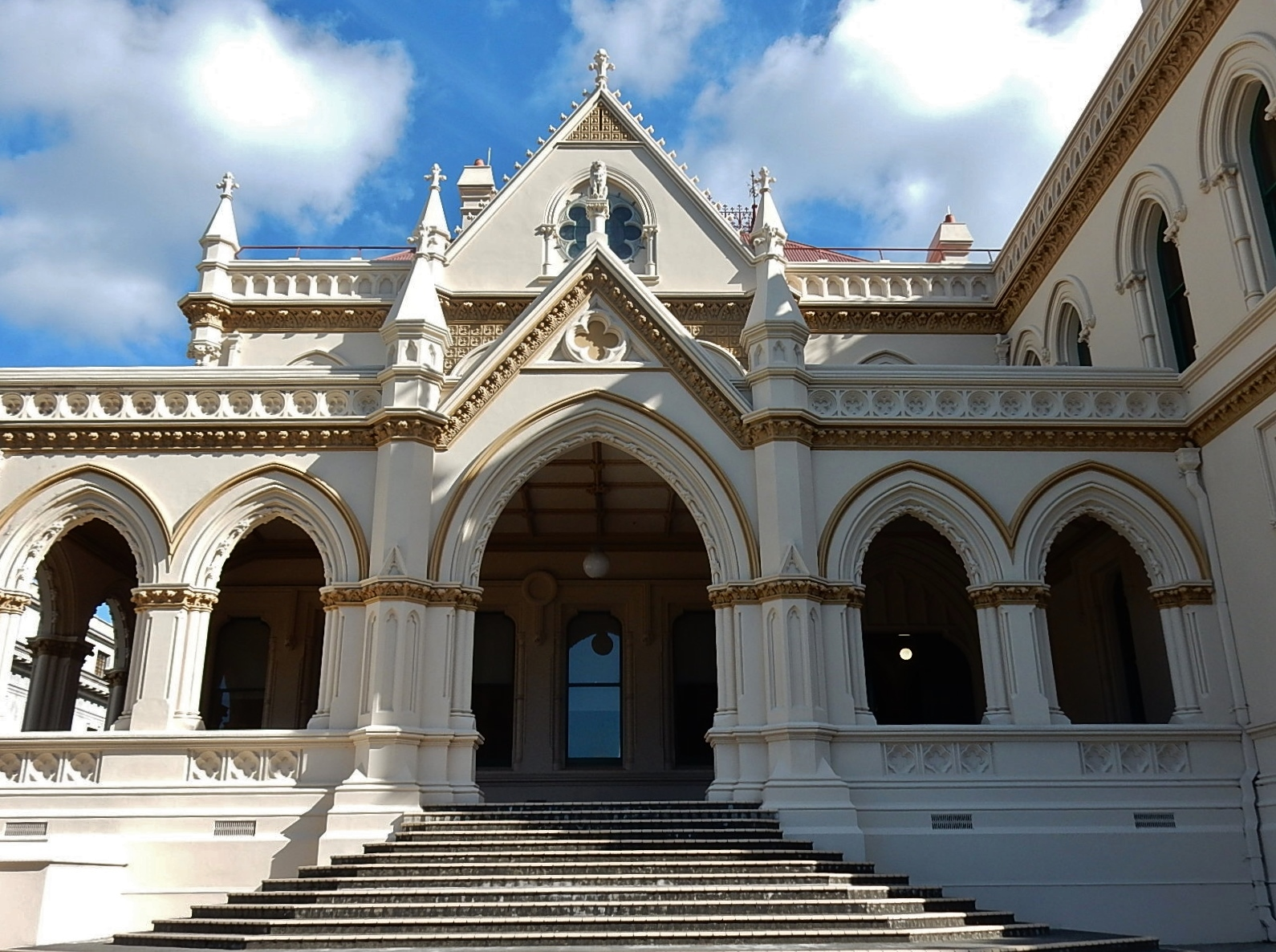
Steps leading to entrance

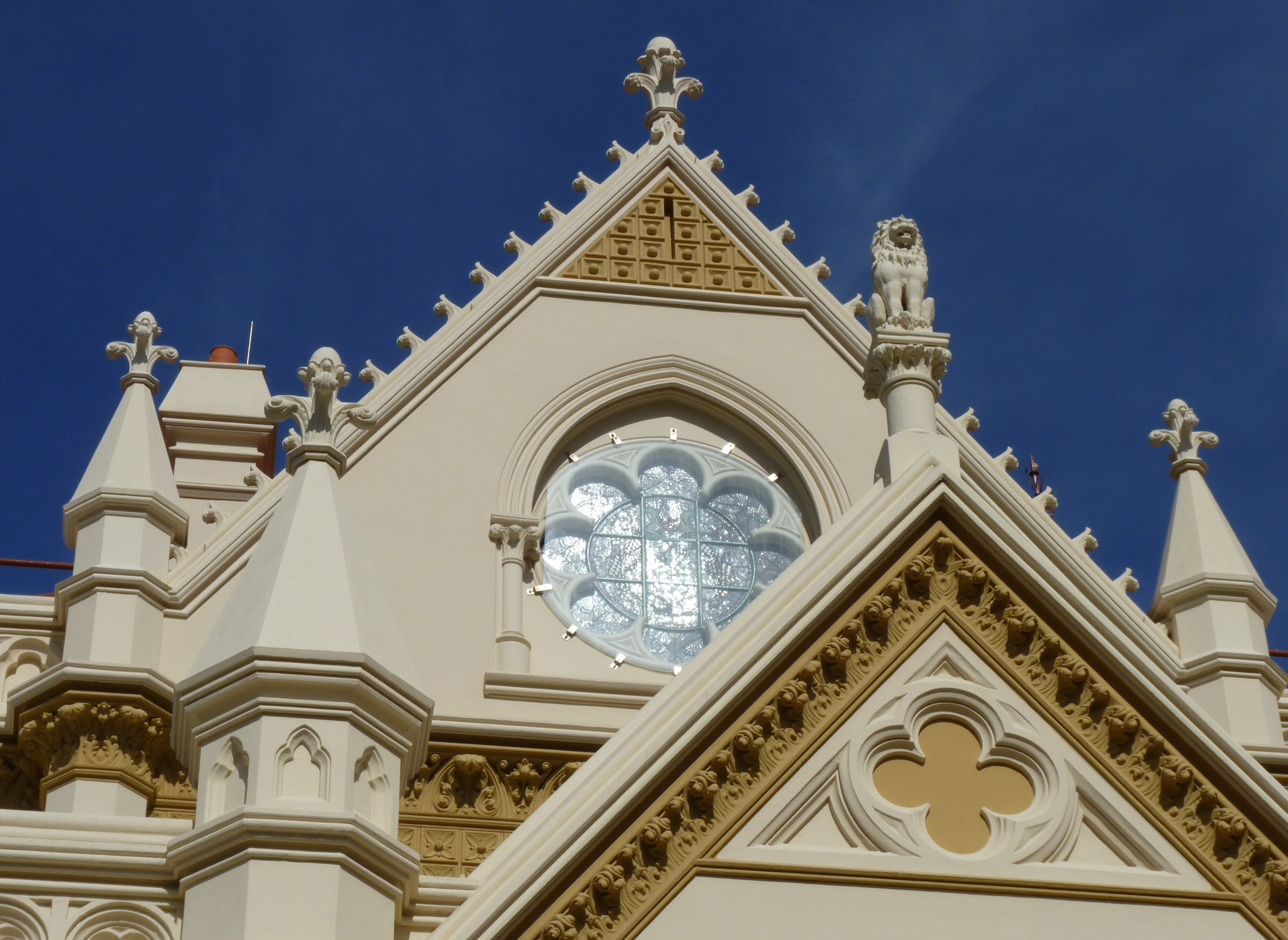
Detail of the roof

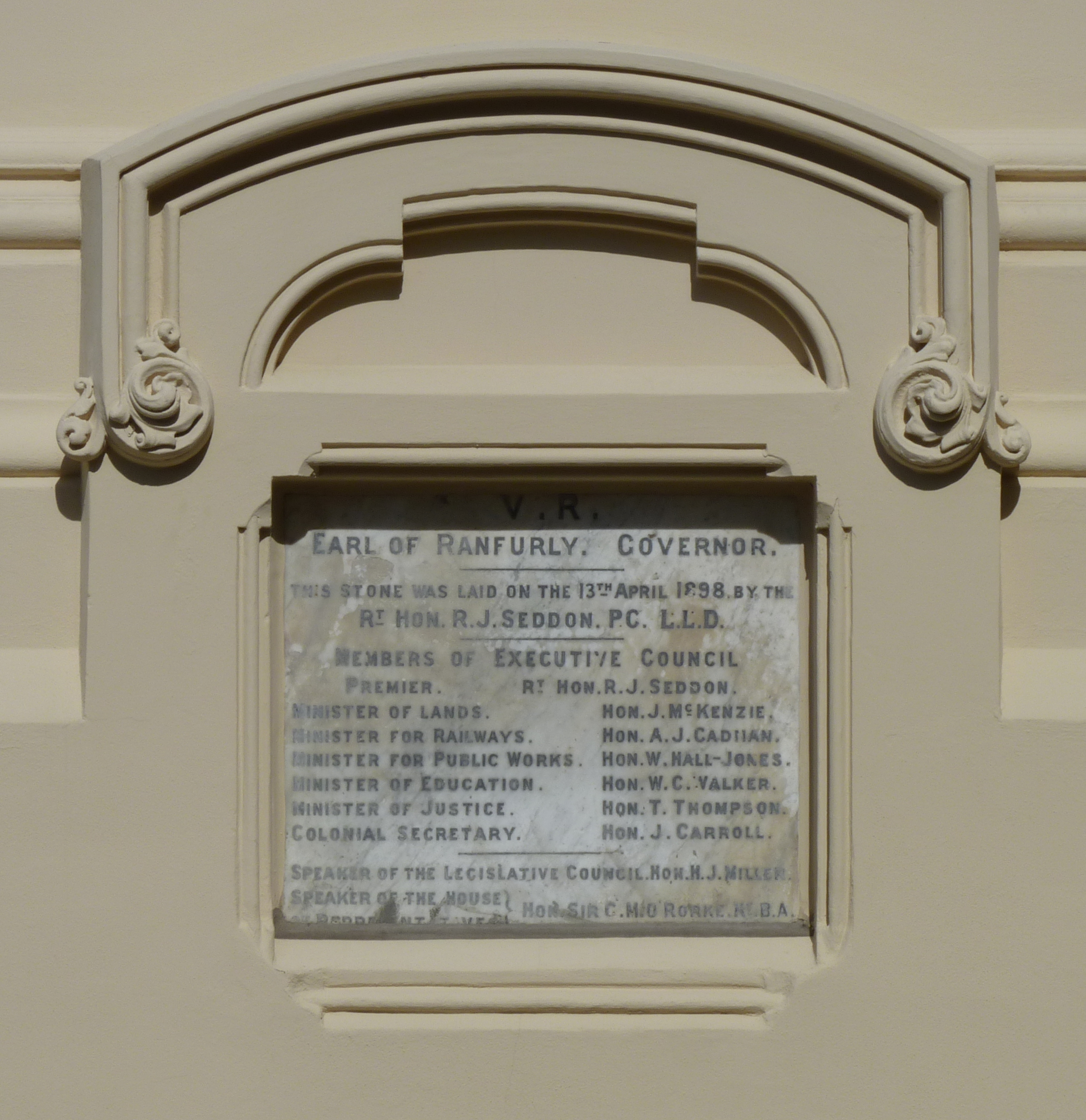
Foundation stone
