= Seasalt Cornwall =

UK clothing company

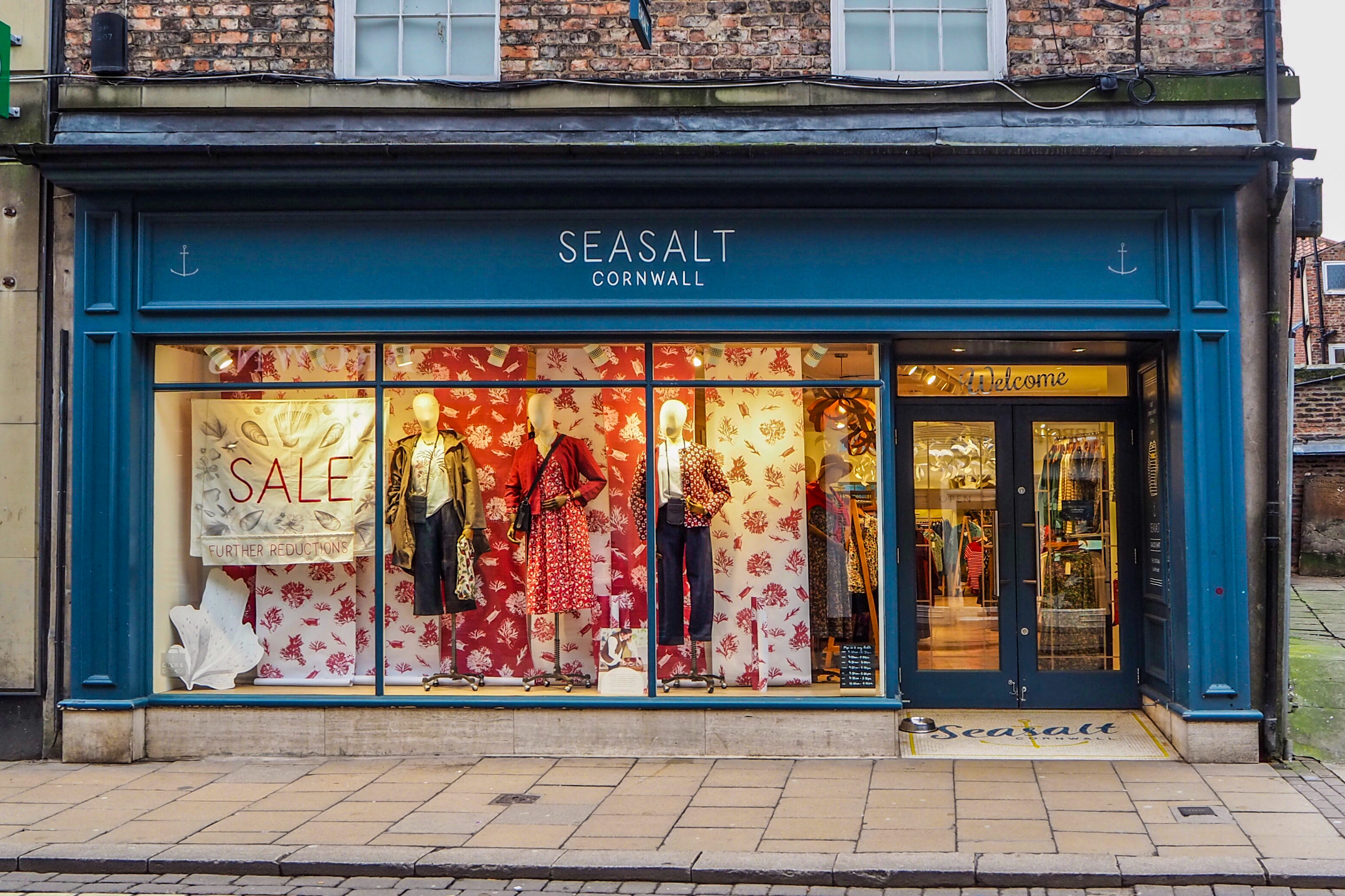
Branch in York

Seasalt Cornwall is a British casual wear clothing brand based in Falmouth, Cornwall, UK.

It was founded by brothers Leigh, Neil and David Chadwick; their family had previously run a clothing shop named General Clothing Stores. In 2018 it received investment from the Business Growth Fund.
