= Old Bank Arcade =

Retail and office complex in New Zealand

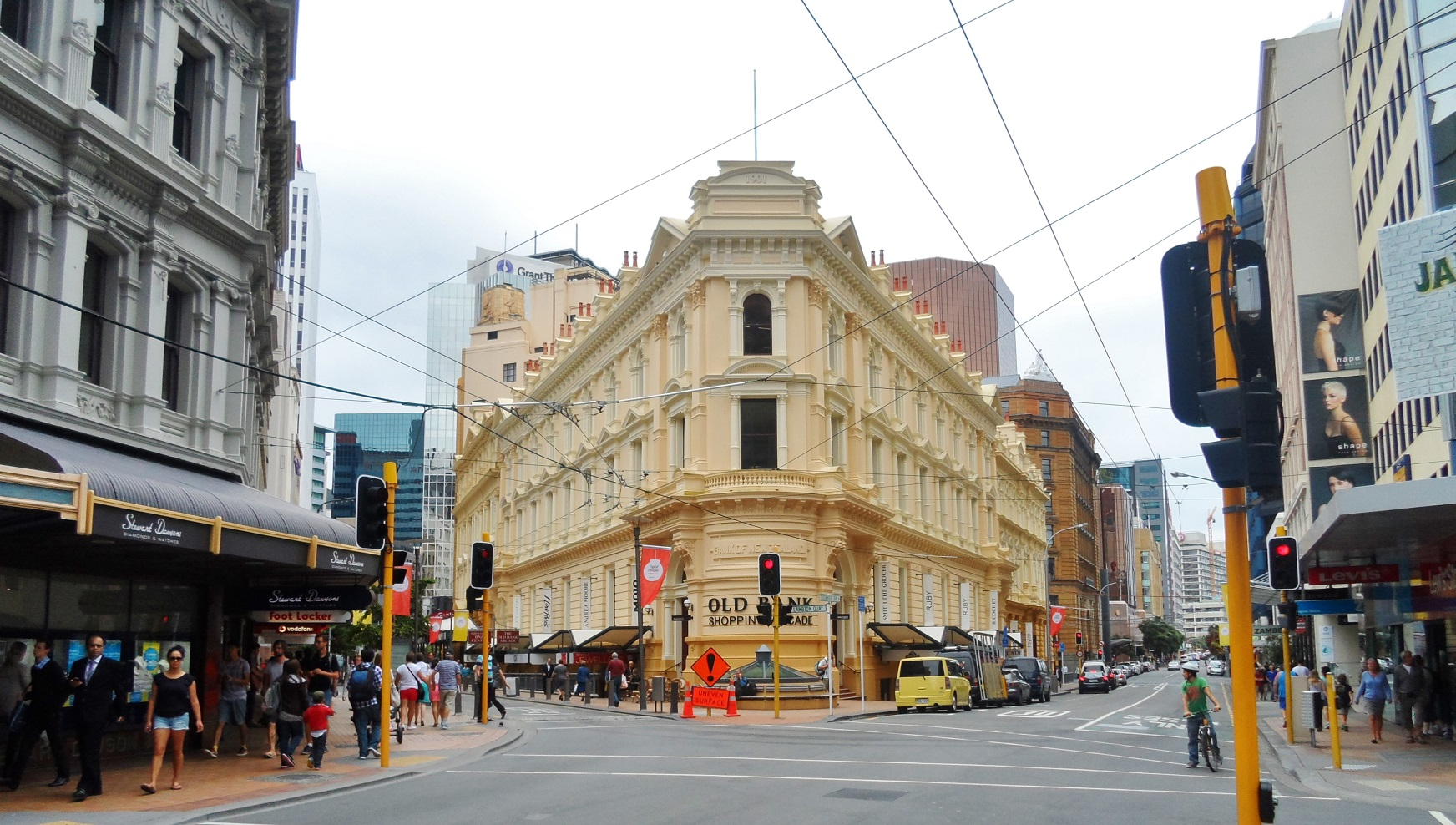
- Old Bank Shopping Arcade
- Interactive map of the Old Bank Arcade area

General information
- Architectural style: Edwardian Baroque/Renaissance classicism
- Location: 239-247 Lambton Quay, Wellington, New Zealand
- Coordinates: 41.286075°S 174.776285°E
- Completed: 1901

Design and construction
- Architects: Thomas Turnbull and Son
- Main contractor: T. Carmichael

Heritage New Zealand – Category 1
- Official name: Bank of New Zealand Building (No 1)
- Designated: 7 April 1983
- Reference no.: 212

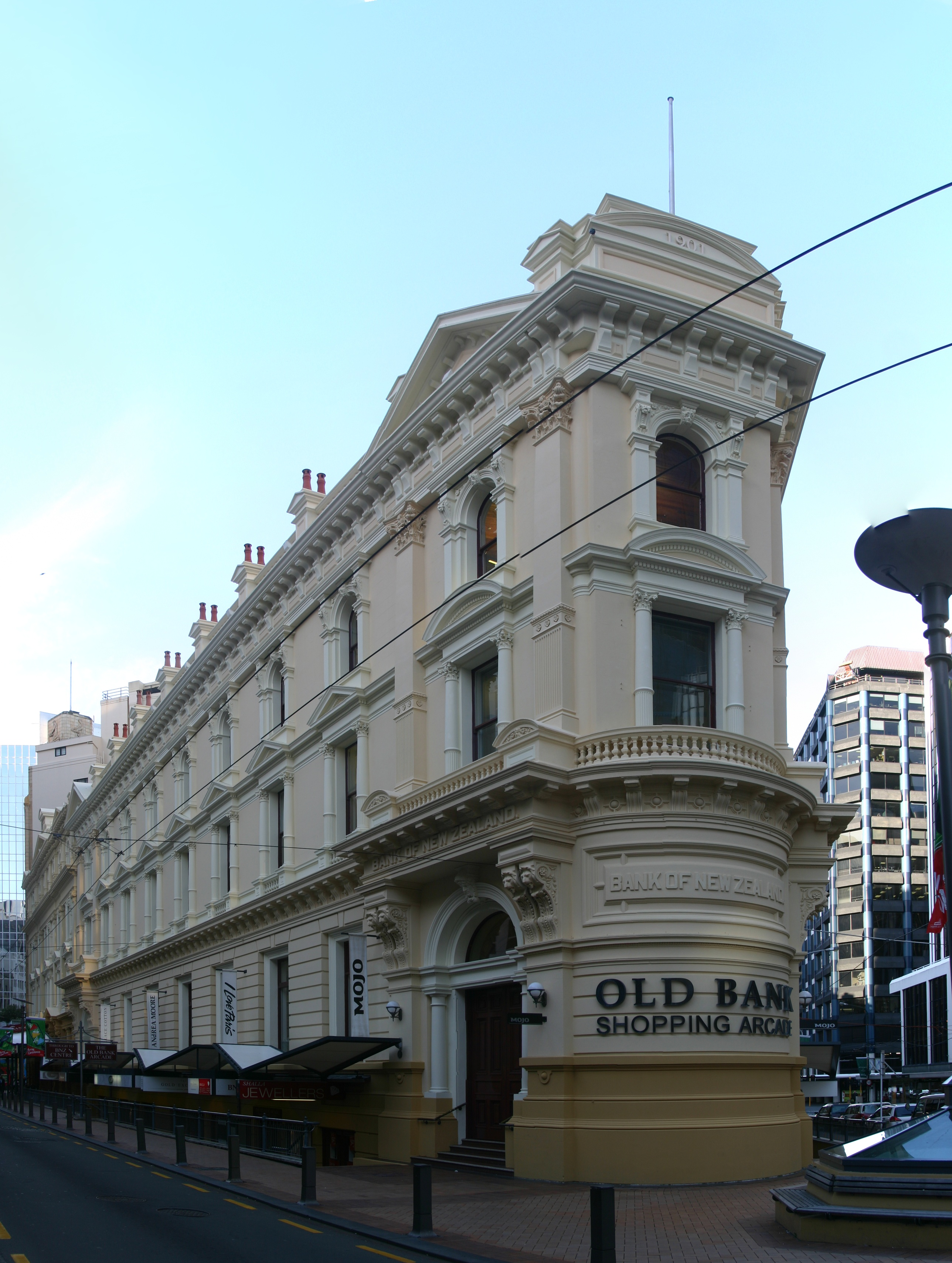
Lambton Quay facade

The Old Bank Arcade is a retail and office complex on a corner site at Lambton Quay, Wellington, New Zealand.

The property consists of four buildings built between 1883 and 1904. The most prominent is the Bank of New Zealand building (no. 1) on the wedge-shaped corner of Lambton Quay and Customhouse Quay. It was designed by Thomas Turnbull for the Bank of New Zealand and is located on the site of Plimmer's Ark. Built by T. Carmichael, it is a brickwork shell with timber flooring, pressed metal ceilings and plaster decoration. The Bank of New Zealand operated a branch on the ground floor of this building from its opening in 1901 until 1984. The banking hall was described by the New Zealand Mail of 1901 as "a handsome, lofty room, said to be one of the largest of its kind in the colonies". This building is classified as a "Category I" ("places of 'special or outstanding historical or cultural heritage significance or value'") historic place by the New Zealand Historic Places Trust.

Other buildings on the site are the Bank of New Zealand Building (no. 2), at 233-237 Lambton Quay, the Bank of New Zealand Building (no. 3) (formerly the National Mutual Life Association of Australasia building) at 98-102 Customhouse Quay and the Bank of New Zealand Building (no. 4) (formerly the New Zealand Accident & Insurance Company building) at 29 Hunter Street.

The Bank of New Zealand Building (no. 2) was built for the Wellington Building and Investment Company in 1904. It was designed by Thomas Turnbull to be a sympathetic neighbour to his Bank of New Zealand building next door. It was bought by the Bank of New Zealand in 1917. The National Mutual Life Association building was also designed by Thomas Turnbull. It was erected in 1883–1884, and at that time was the tallest building in Wellington. It is the oldest of the four buildings making up the Old Bank Arcade site. The Bank of New Zealand bought this building in 1963. The fourth building on the site is the New Zealand Accident & Insurance Building, designed by Hislop and Walden and erected in 1903. The Bank of New Zealand bought this building in 1938.

Wellington City Council took possession of all four buildings in 1975, in exchange for the Bank of New Zealand acquiring land at the corner of Willis Street for their new BNZ Centre. After 1984 the buildings fell into disrepair until renovation as the Old Bank Arcade in 1997.

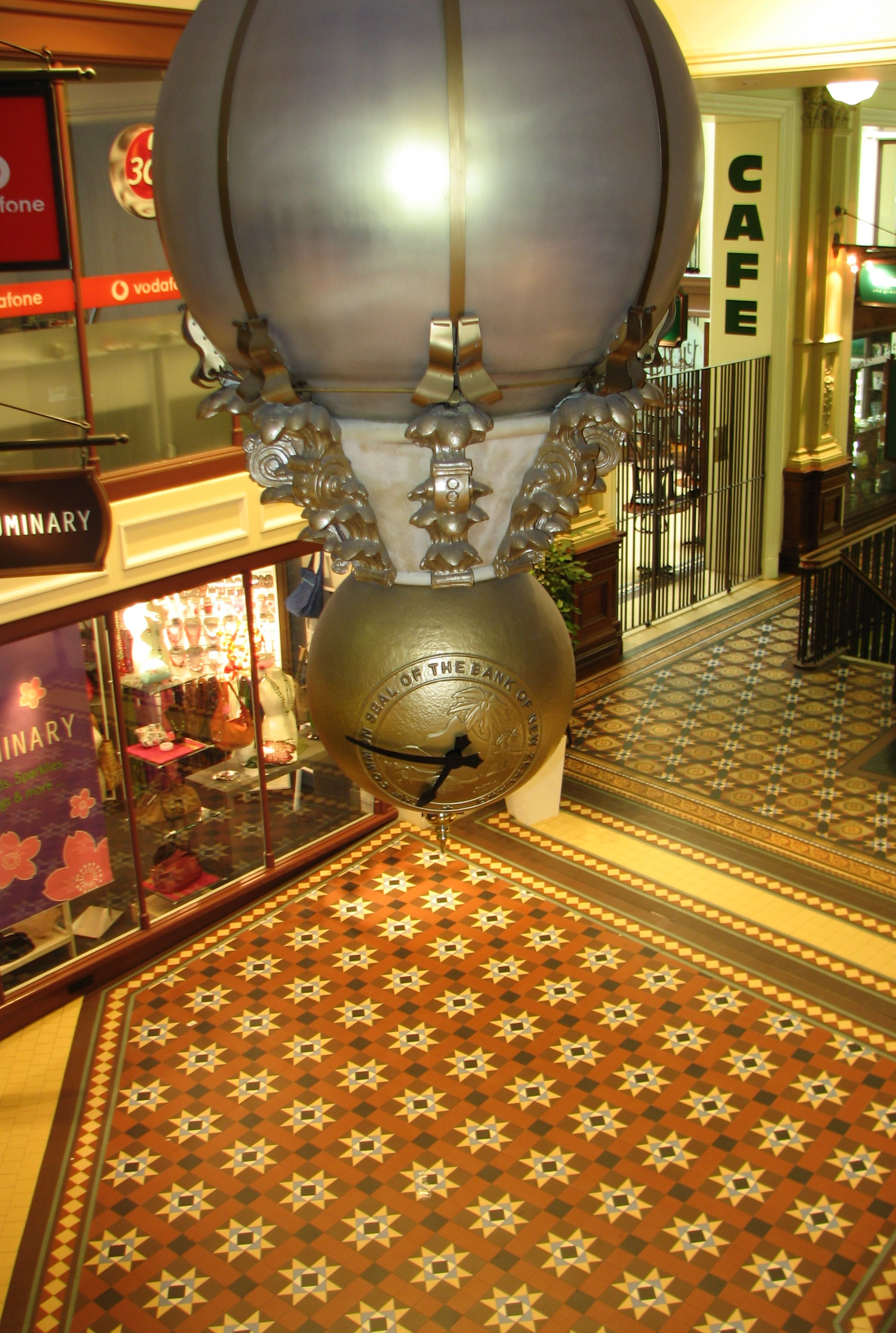
Old Bank Clock

The Australian company Ipoh bought the four buildings from Wellington City Council for $1 in 1994, on the understanding that they would refurbish the site. In 1997, plans were announced for a $26 million redevelopment of the four Bank of New Zealand buildings into a retail and office complex. Downer Construction was the chosen contractor. At the time, a manager from Downer said that one of the challenges would be "to lift the buildings, and hold them up while pouring several thousand cubic metres of concrete in the basement without dropping it". Downer put the foundations on rubber and lead bearings as part of earthquake strengthening measures. An underground walkway linking the Arcade to the BNZ Centre opened in February 1999, and shops began opening for business in the complex in March 1999. A $150,000 musical clock was installed as a centrepiece in the refurbished building. Each hour, four petals open to reveal animated scenes relating to the life and times of the former Bank of New Zealand site. The clock was made by Timetech Systems Ltd of Lower Hutt, with robotic work contracted to Miramar-based firm Robotechnology Ltd.
