= Inconstant (ship) =

Sailing ship built in 1848

Coordinates: 41°17′8.68″S 174°46′34.56″E

History

Canada
- Name: Inconstant
- Owner: T.D. Archibald
- Port of registry: Sydney, Nova Scotia; Official No. 9012761
- Builder: George Old, Big Bras d'Or, Nova Scotia
- Launched: 1848
- Maiden voyage: Sydney, Nova Scotia to London, England, 1848

General characteristics
- Tonnage: 601 GRT
- Length: 121.8 ft (37.1 m)
- Beam: 27.4 ft (8.4 m)
- Depth: 23.4 ft (7.1 m)
- Decks: 2
- Propulsion: Sail
- Sail plan: Full-rigged ship
- Crew: 33

Inconstant was a wooden full-rigged sailing ship built in 1848 at Cape Breton, Nova Scotia which later became known as "Plimmer's Ark" and played an important role in the development of Wellington, New Zealand. The ship's hull remains in Wellington today as an important archaeological site.

Built by George Old at Big Bras d'Or, Nova Scotia Inconstant was one of largest wooden ships ever built in Cape Breton Island, Nova Scotia and the largest ship built by Old, a shipbuilder who started with schooners before focusing mainly on brigs. The ship was sold to owners in London, England and made a voyage to Australia carrying immigrants. On a subsequent Australian voyage, she was wrecked at Wellington, New Zealand in 1851 when she put in for water and ran aground.

After the ship was deemed too badly damaged to sail again, the hull was purchased by John Plimmer, an entrepreneur later known as "the Father of Wellington". The hull was converted to a prominent wharf on the Wellington waterfront where it became known as "Plimmer's Ark". Linked to the shore by a bridge the ship served as one of the first piers in Wellington with the interior serving as a warehouse and auction room. It also served as a bonded customs store, immigration pier and office for the first Wellington harbourmaster. A light mounted at the seaward side of the ship became the first harbour light in Wellington.

The hull later became a ship chandlery and gradually became landlocked between 1857 and 1860 as the Wellington waterfront was expanded. Inconstant became surrounded by Lambton Quay, Customhouse Quay and Willis Street in a wedge shaped piece of land. The upper works were demolished in 1883 and the lower hull disappeared under the first Bank of New Zealand. In the late 1990s when a new commercial development ('Old Bank Arcade') was built on the bank site, the remains of the hull were discovered and excavated by archaeologists. The lower bilges of the ship were found, running 38 metres (125 ft) from bow to stern. Several important early Canadian shipbuilding features were documented including the use of birch for main ship timbers some of which still bore layers of birch bark. The bow of the hull was preserved under glass and displayed with various associated artifacts in the arcade of the new development.

Kirkcaldie & Stains opened for business on 9 December 1863 in a portion of the Ark named Waterloo House.
