= William Turnbull (New Zealand architect) =

New Zealand architect (1868–1941)

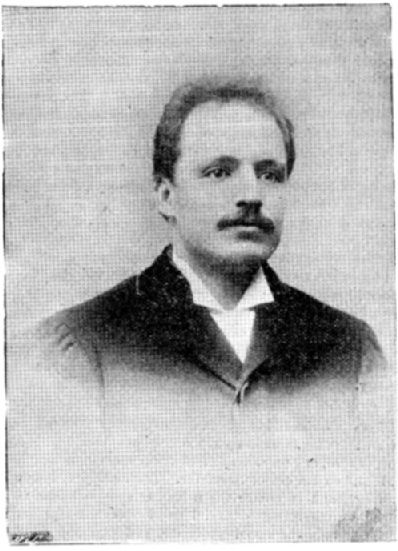
- Born: 1868; San Francisco, United States of America
- Died: 22 June 1941 (aged 73); Wellington, New Zealand
- Occupation: Architect
- Parent: Thomas Turnbull
- Practice: Thomas Turnbull & Son
- Projects: Antrim House; Henry Pollen House; Turnbull House

William Turnbull (1868 – 22 June 1941) was an architect based in Wellington, New Zealand. He was the fourth and youngest son of architect Thomas Turnbull. He joined his father's practice in 1882 and became a partner in 1891. He was born in San Francisco where his father was working at the time. He moved to New Zealand with his family in 1871. In his younger years, he played rugby union at Poneke Football Club in Kilbirnie.

Turnbull designed a large house including three rooms to hold a library for bibliophile Alexander Turnbull (no relation) in 1914. The outbreak of World War I caused the construction to be delayed until late 1915, with Alexander Turnbull moving in the following year. Turnbull House was used as a library until 1973, and the collection formed the nucleus of the national library collection. Turnbull House is listed by Heritage New Zealand as a Category I heritage building.

Turnbull moved to his son's house in Willis Street when he was old, and he died there on 22 June 1941, aged 73. He was buried at Karori Cemetery. His wife had died 18 months before him. He was survived by four sons and four daughters.

== Gallery of his work ==
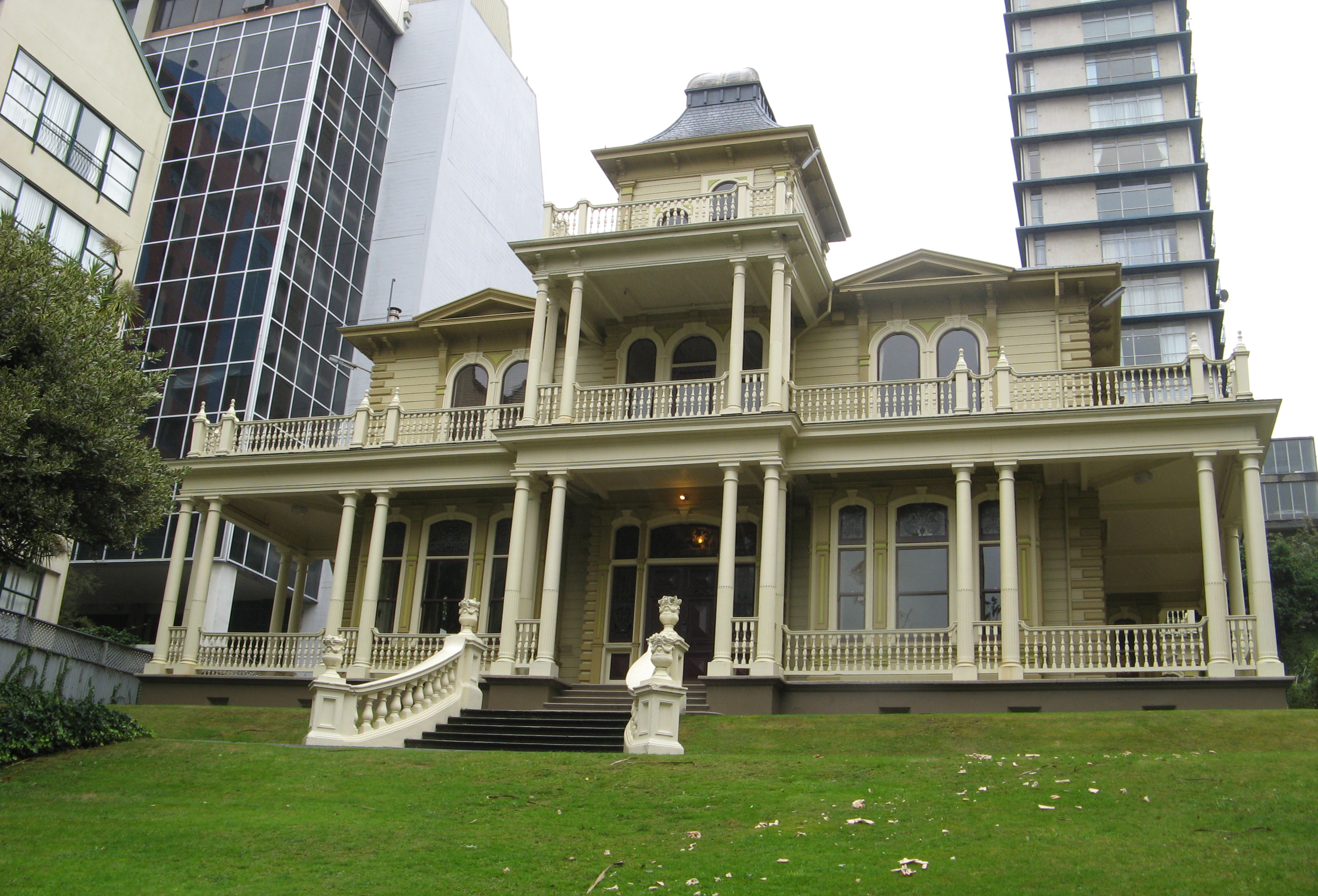
Antrim House

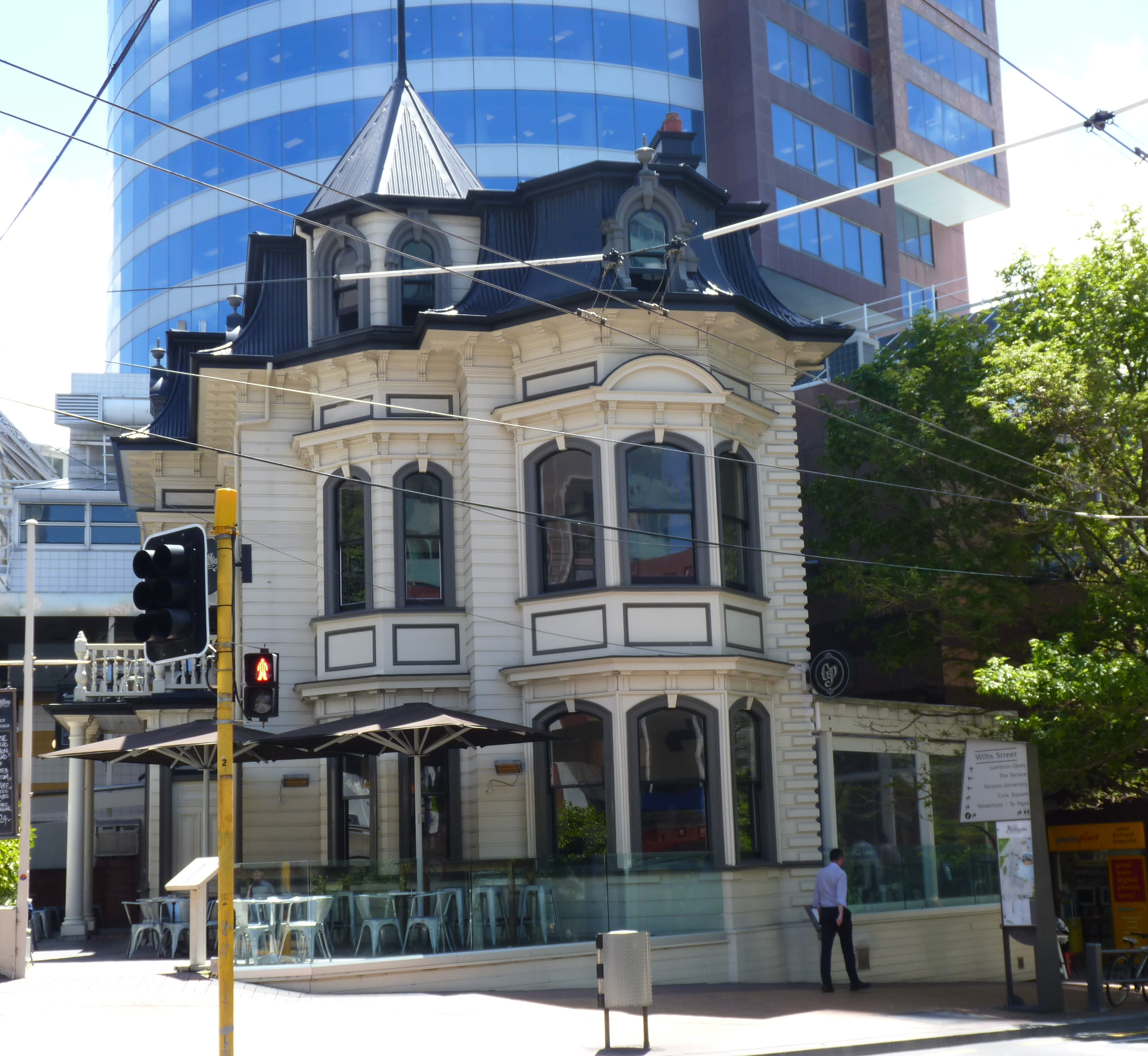
Dr Henry Pollen's House

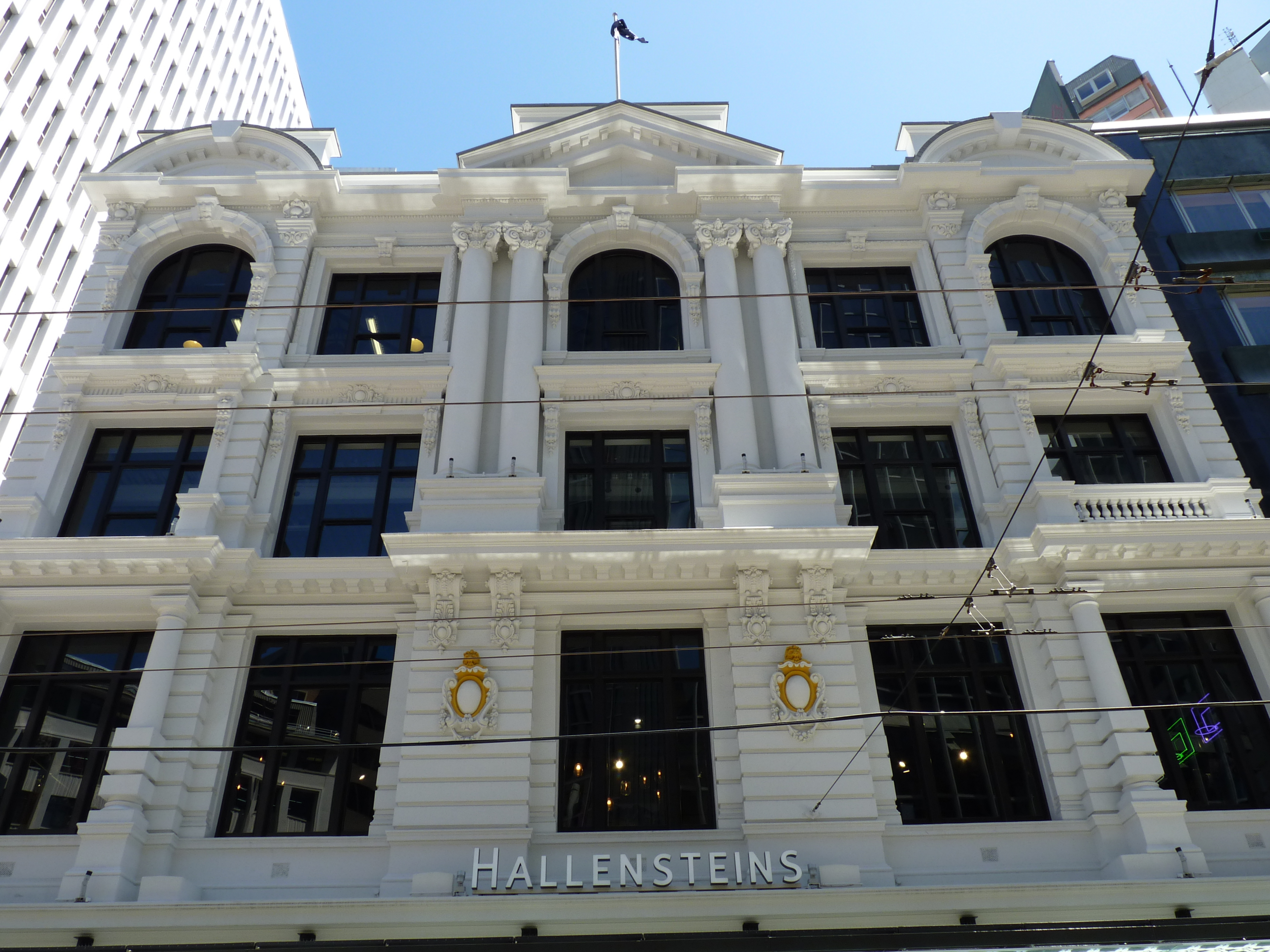
Whitcoulls Building, Lambton quay, Wellington

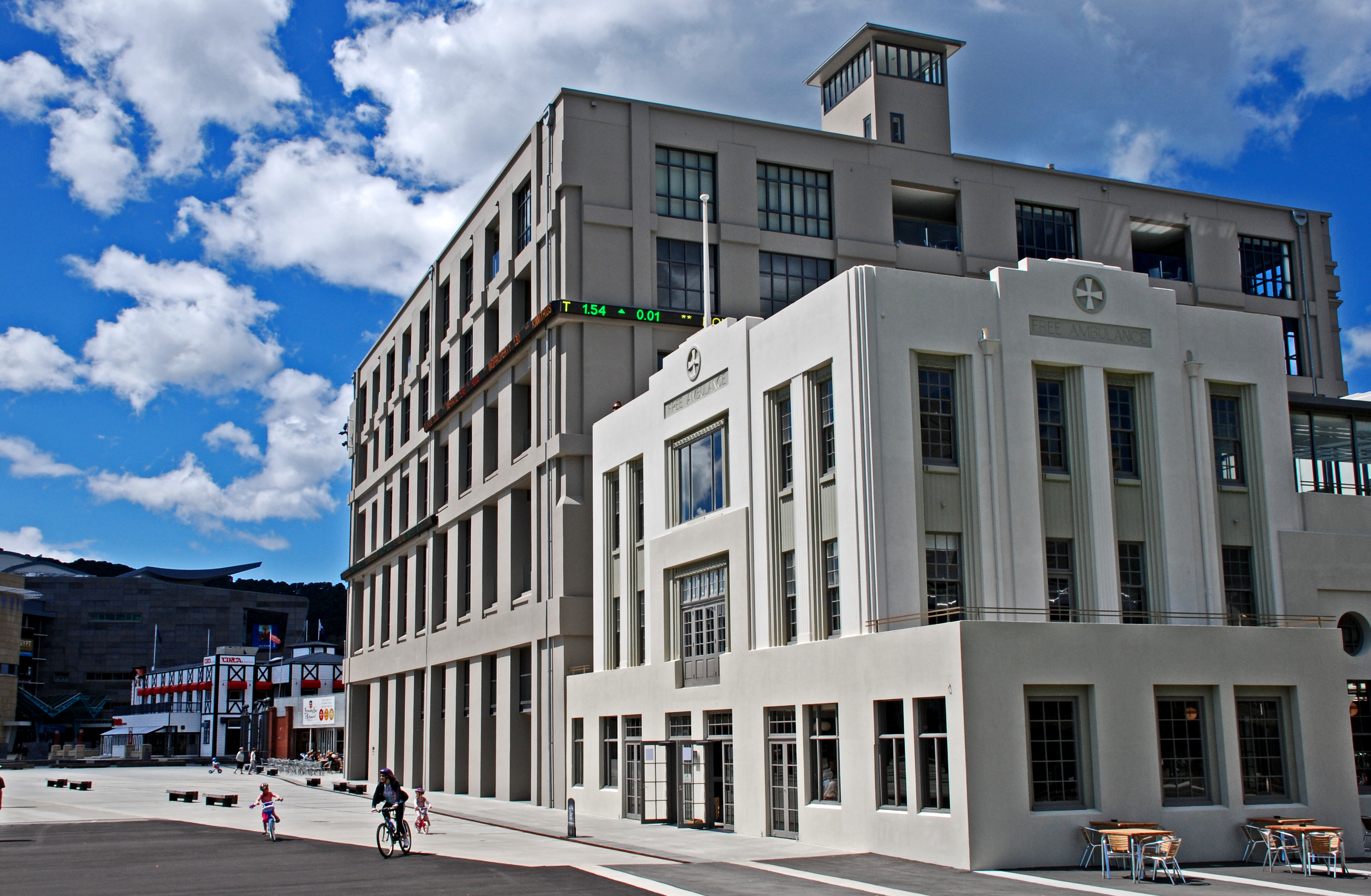
The Wellington Free Ambulance Building

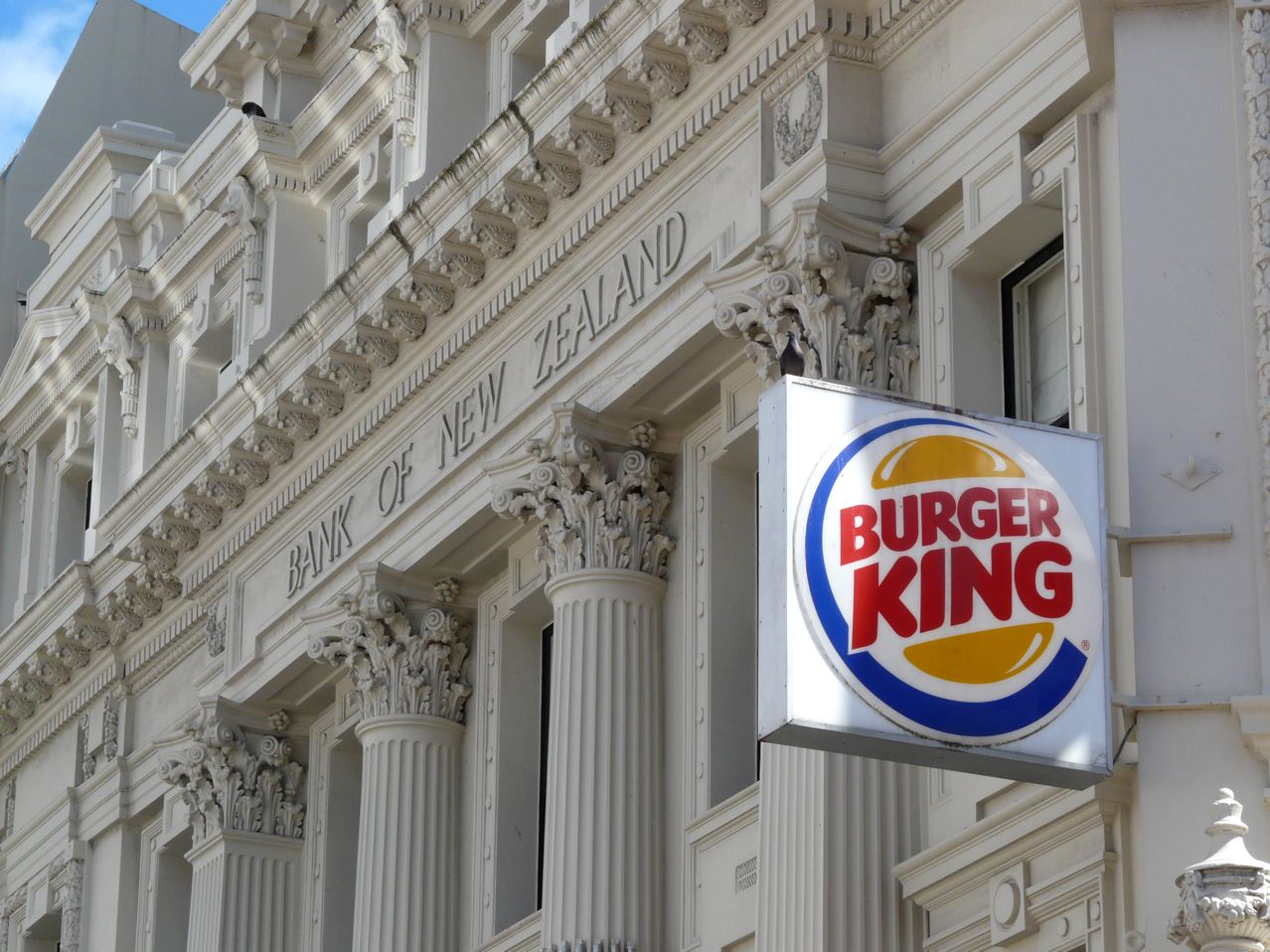
Bank of New Zealand, Cuba St, Wellington

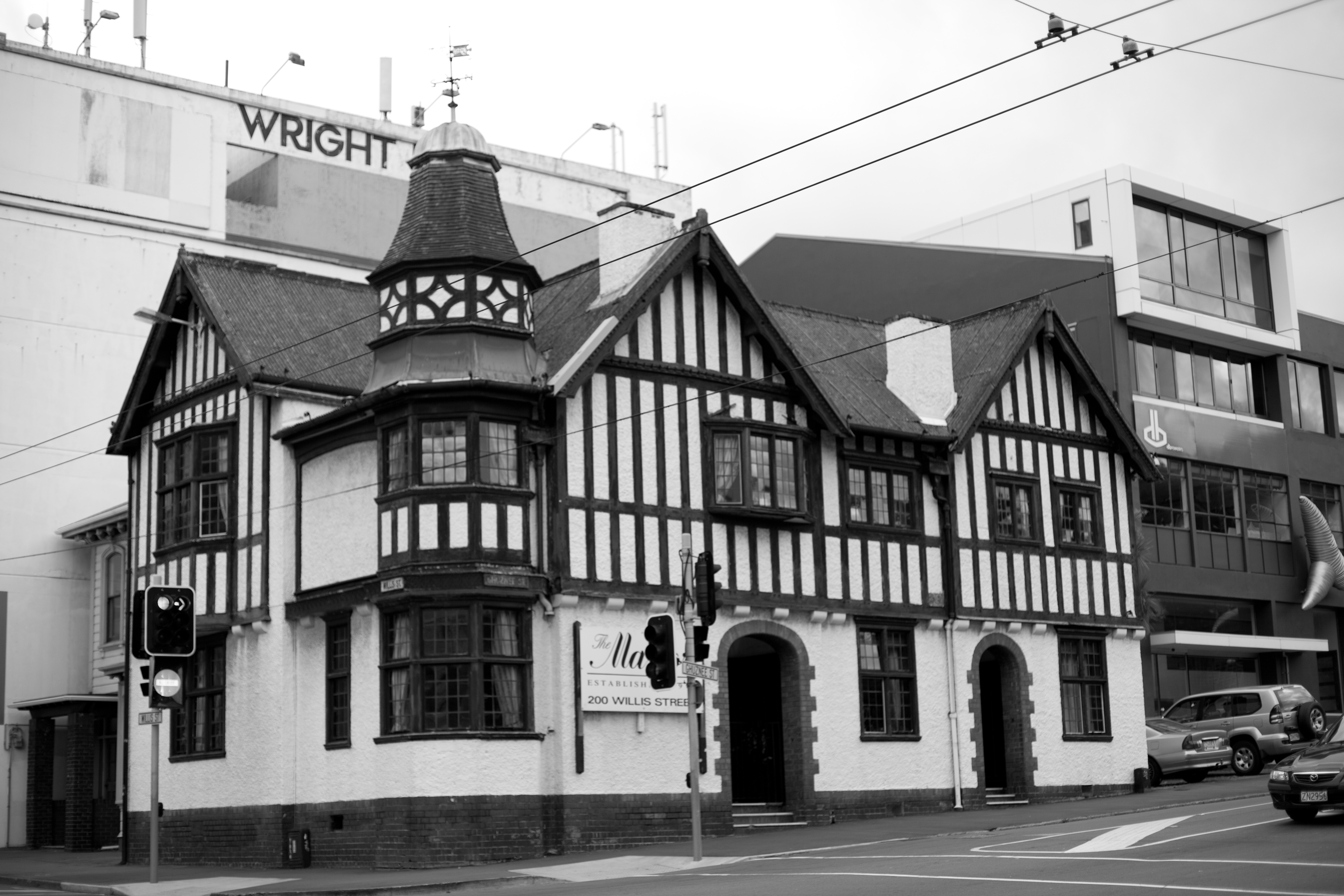
McGavin House, the former Red Cross Building

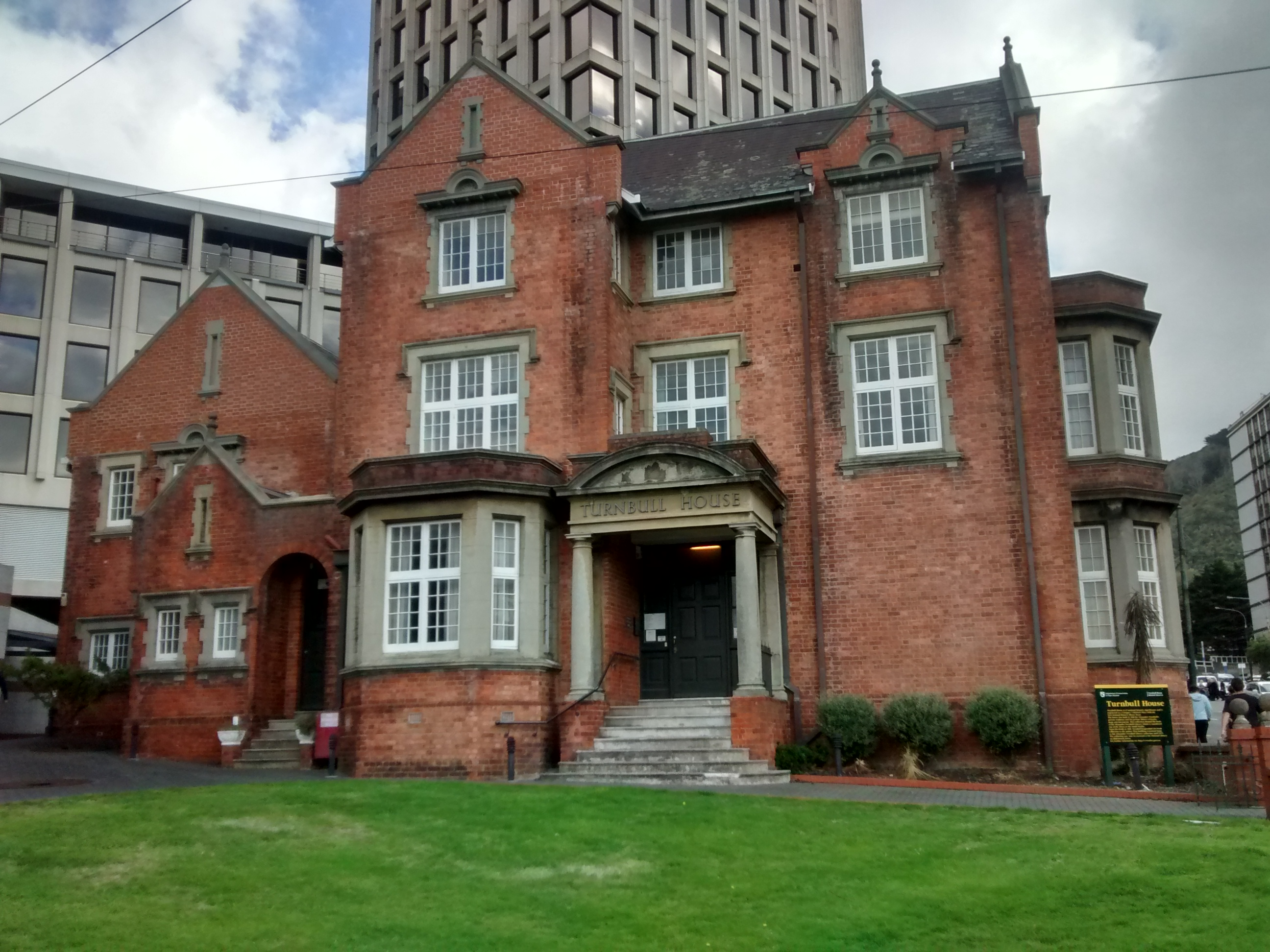
Turnbull House
