= Turnbull House =

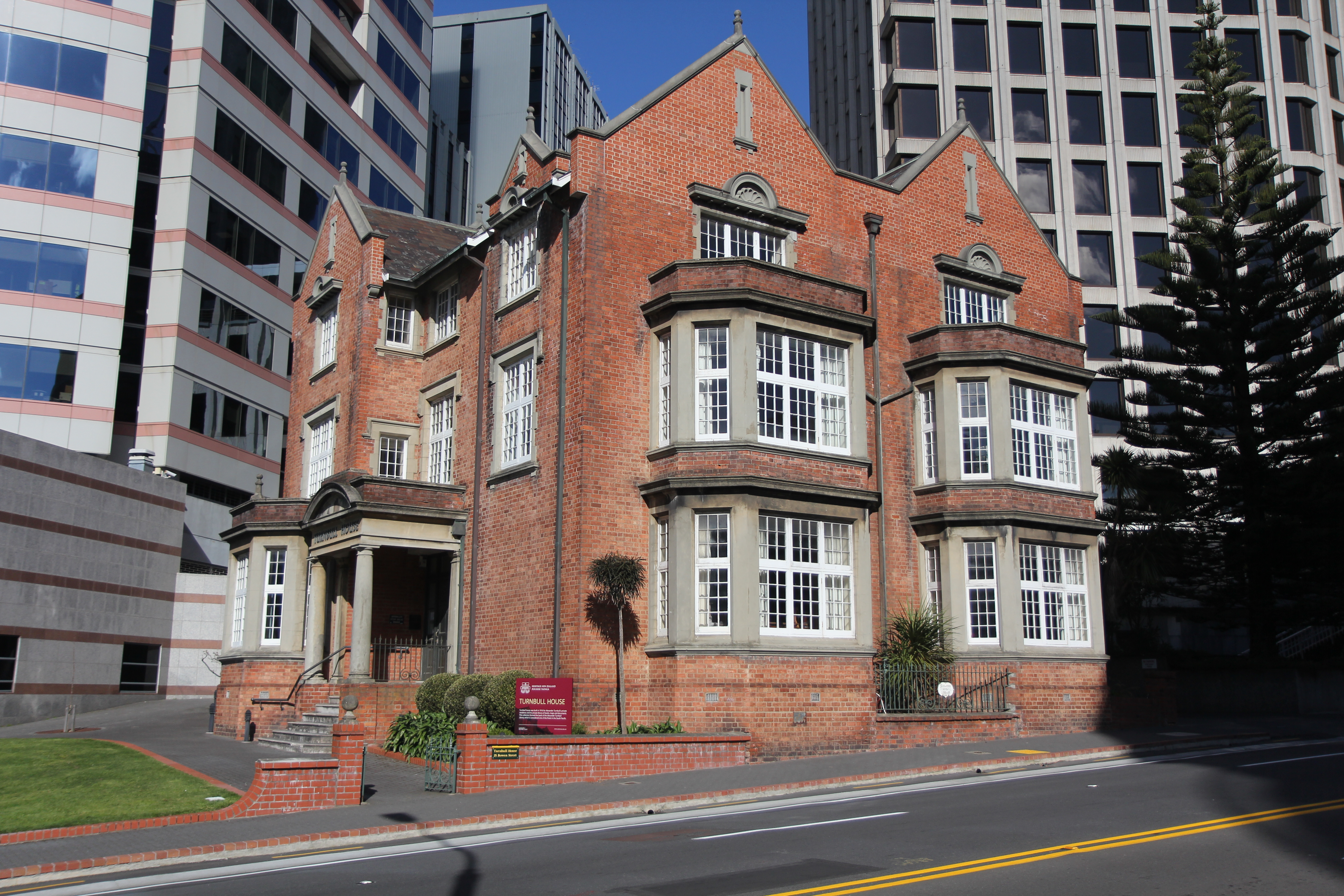

General information
- Location: 41.27910°S 174.77646°E, 25–27 Bowen Street, Wellington, New Zealand
- Named for: Alexander Turnbull
- Owner: Heritage New Zealand

Design and construction
- Architect: William Turnbull

Heritage New Zealand – Category 1
- Designated: 25-Nov-1982
- Reference no.: 232

Turnbull House is a historic building in Wellington, New Zealand. It was built in 1915 as the residence of Alexander Turnbull and to house his private library, later bequeathed to New Zealand as the Alexander Turnbull Library. It is listed by Heritage New Zealand as a Category 1 Historic Place. Turnbull House is situated across the road from The Beehive, and is now completely surrounded by the much larger buildings which form New Zealand's Parliamentary Precinct, including Bowen House, the Treasury Building, Parliament House and The Beehive.

== History ==
Turnbull House was constructed in 1916 in order to house both Alexander Turnbull and his large book collection. The outbreak of World War I delayed construction of the house. After Turnbull's death in 1918, the house was purchased by the government in 1920 and opened to the public as the Alexander Turnbull Library. The library stayed in the building until 1973 when the collection was incorporated into the National Library of New Zealand.

In 1994 the Department of Conservation conducted restoration work.

In 2012 it was closed after being considered at risk of collapse in an earthquake by Wellington City Council. Investigations took longer than expected but strengthening work was intended to be completed before a 2023 deadline. Turnbull House was transferred from the Department of Conservation to Heritage New Zealand on 30 June 2017.

In 2024, a construction contract was signed for refurbishment of the building, including seismic strengthening and improvements to weather-tightness.

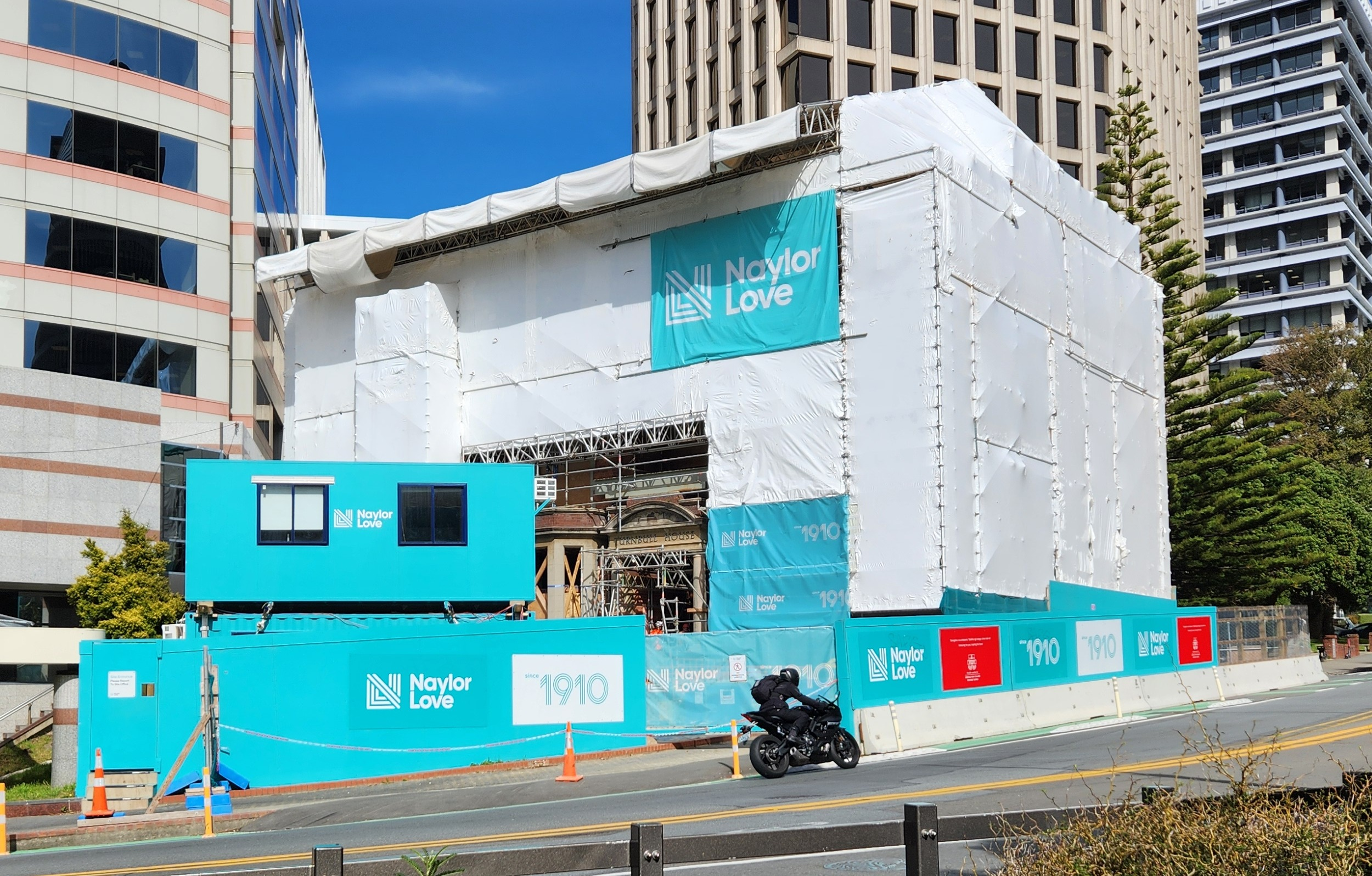
Turnbull House being restored in March 2026

== Description ==
Turnbull House is a three-storey brick building located on Bowen Street. Turnbull House's architecture is a mix of Queen Anne and Scottish baronial architecture and was designed by architect William Turnbull (no relation). The building's design incorporated three large library rooms to house Turnbull's large collection of books, maps, and documents.
