= McGavin House =

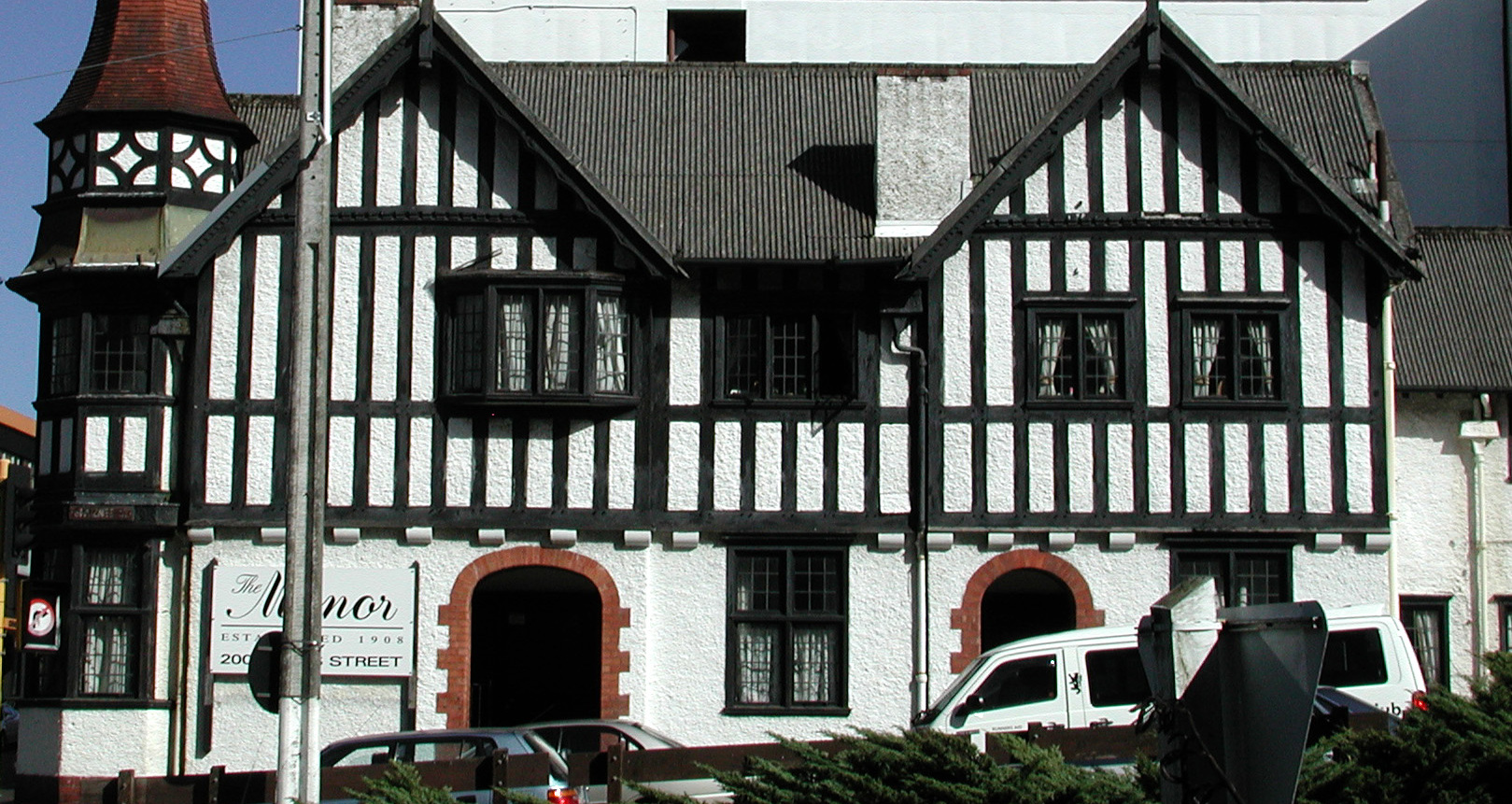
- McGavin House
- Interactive map of the McGavin House area
- Former names: McGavin House and Surgery

General information
- Architectural style: Tudor
- Location: 200 Willis Street, Wellington, New Zealand
- Coordinates: 41.29238°S 174.772651°E
- Construction started: 1907
- Completed: 1908

Design and construction
- Architects: Thomas Turnbull and Son

Heritage New Zealand – Category 1
- Designated: 15 Feb 1990
- Reference no.: 1342

McGavin House, also known as the former Red Cross Building, is a building in Wellington, New Zealand, classified as a Category 1 Historic Place (places of "special or outstanding historical or cultural heritage significance or value") by Heritage New Zealand.

The building was designed by Willilam Turnbull and constructed in 1907 for Dr Donald McGavin as his home and surgery. The building is constructed of brick with decorative jarrah timber facings in a Tudor style. It was painted white in the 1940s. Other Tudor features are the leadlight windows, slightly projecting upper floor with exposed beams and lead rainwater head with the date 1908 beaten into it. Inside, the original hall, staircase, dining room and drawing room were lined with wood panelling, and the plaster ceilings were decorated with cornices and modelled ornament.

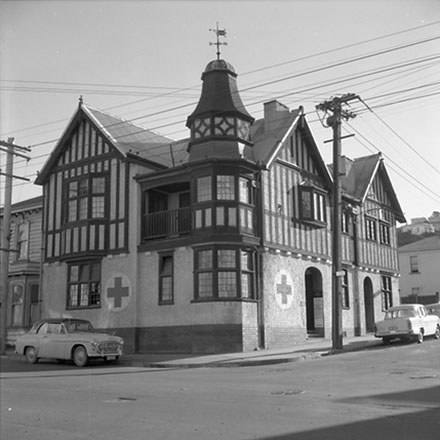
Red Cross Building, 1960

Dr McGavin lived in the building until the 1940s. From 1944 to 1947 the building was occupied by the United Industries Club, an organisation created to support young women living away from home in the city. In 1947 The Red Cross bought the building and it was used as their regional centre until 1981. It later became known as 'The Manor' and rooms were rented out as medium- to long-term accommodation.
