= Shona Riddell =

New Zealand author

Shona Riddell is an author, journalist and podcaster from Wellington, New Zealand. She has written three books: Guiding Lights (Exisle Publishing, 2020); Trial of Strength (Exisle Publishing, 2018); and The Tale of the ANZAC Tortoise (2015, illustrated by the New Zealand Defence Force artist Matt Gauldie).

== Books ==
Guiding Lights (2020) is a maritime history book about female lighthouse keepers around the world, including Mary Jane Bennett, New Zealand's only appointed female lighthouse keeper, who ran Pencarrow Lighthouse in Wellington from 1855 to 1865.

Trial of Strength (2018) is a history book about New Zealand and Australia's Subantarctic islands, from early exploration and sealing to colonial settlements (Riddell is descended from two Hardwicke settlers), farming, shipwrecks, and ongoing conservation efforts to make the islands predator-free. The book includes information about the Auckland Islands, Campbell Islands, Antipodes and Bounty Islands, Snares Islands, and Macquarie Island.

The Tale of the ANZAC Tortoise (2015) is an illustrated book about two children who travel back in time to Gallipoli during World War I and witness a wounded soldier giving a tortoise to a war nurse. The story was inspired by a tortoise in Riddell's family and was the subject of an episode from the New Zealand documentary series Great War Stories. The book was illustrated by former NZ Army artist Matt Gauldie.

== Podcast ==
Riddell is the creator and host of the New Zealand podcast Swim Chats, which features fortnightly interviews with swimmers, coaches, marine scientists, and others. Guests include New Zealand coach and English Channel triple crossing world record holder Philip Rush, and American ultramarathon swimmer Lynne Cox.
