= Edward Roberts (engineer) =

New Zealand architect and engineer

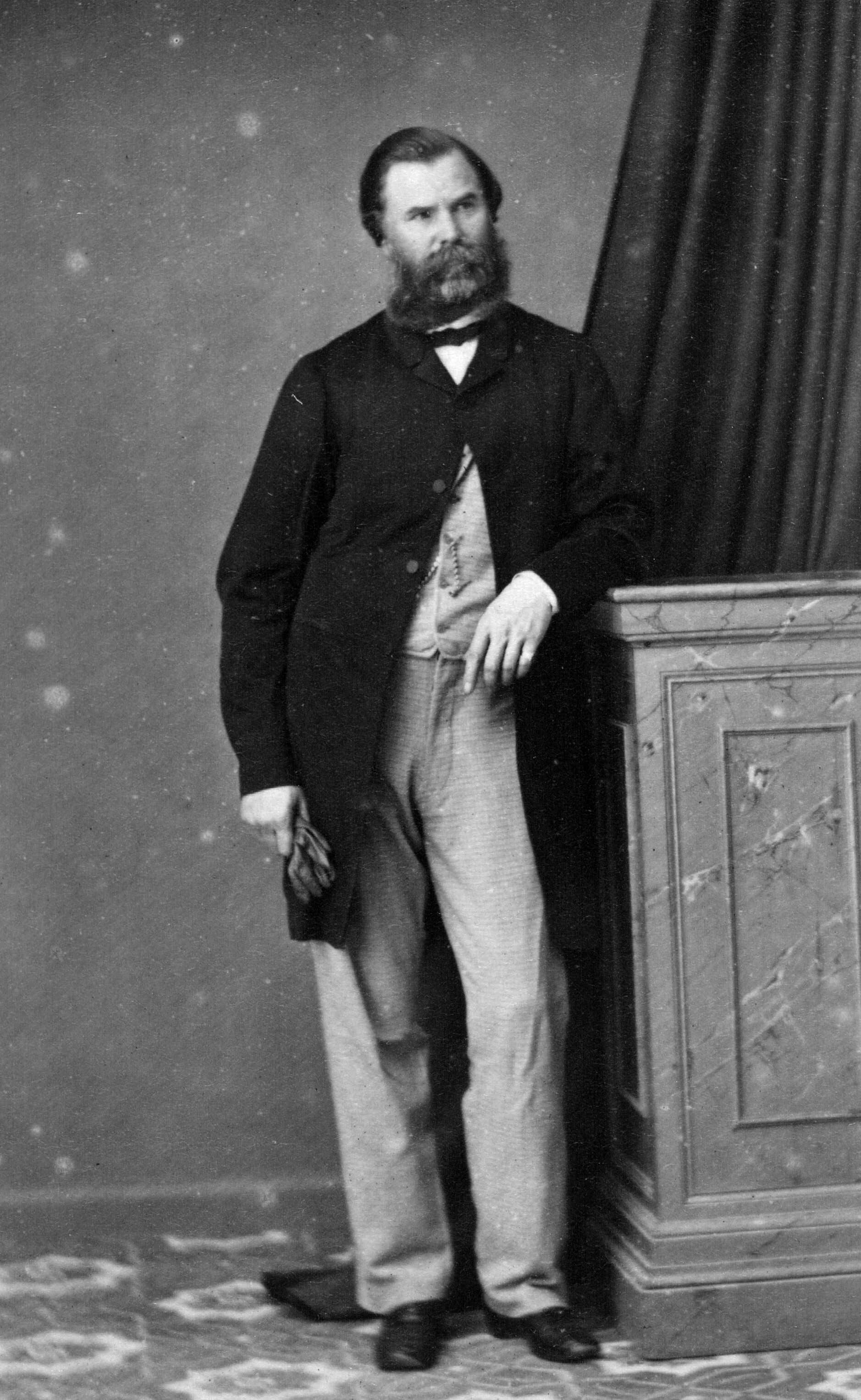

Edward Roberts was a New Zealand architect and engineer. Roberts early life in England is unknown but he came to New Zealand from England as a civilian with the Royal Engineers. Roberts was involved in both architecture and engineering in Wellington, designing buildings such as the colonial hospital and designing a harbour reclamation plan. Roberts also was a witness to the 1855 Wairarapa earthquake and his reports are an important primary source for geologists.

== Early life ==
Nothing is known about Edward Roberts life before he came to New Zealand. Roberts arrived in New Zealand in 1847 as a civilian in the Royal Engineers to work on military construction. It is estimated he was in his late 20s or early 30s upon his arrival. Roberts possibly trained under the Royal Engineers at Woolwich or at the Royal School of Military Engineering in Chatham, Kent.

In 1849 an E Roberts was listed as an architect living on Boulcott Street in Wellington. This same E Roberts purchased property on The Terrace in August. In October a map of Wellington was published by 'Mr Roberts' who was working for the 'Engineer Department'. Both these Roberts are likely to be Edward Roberts.

== Career ==
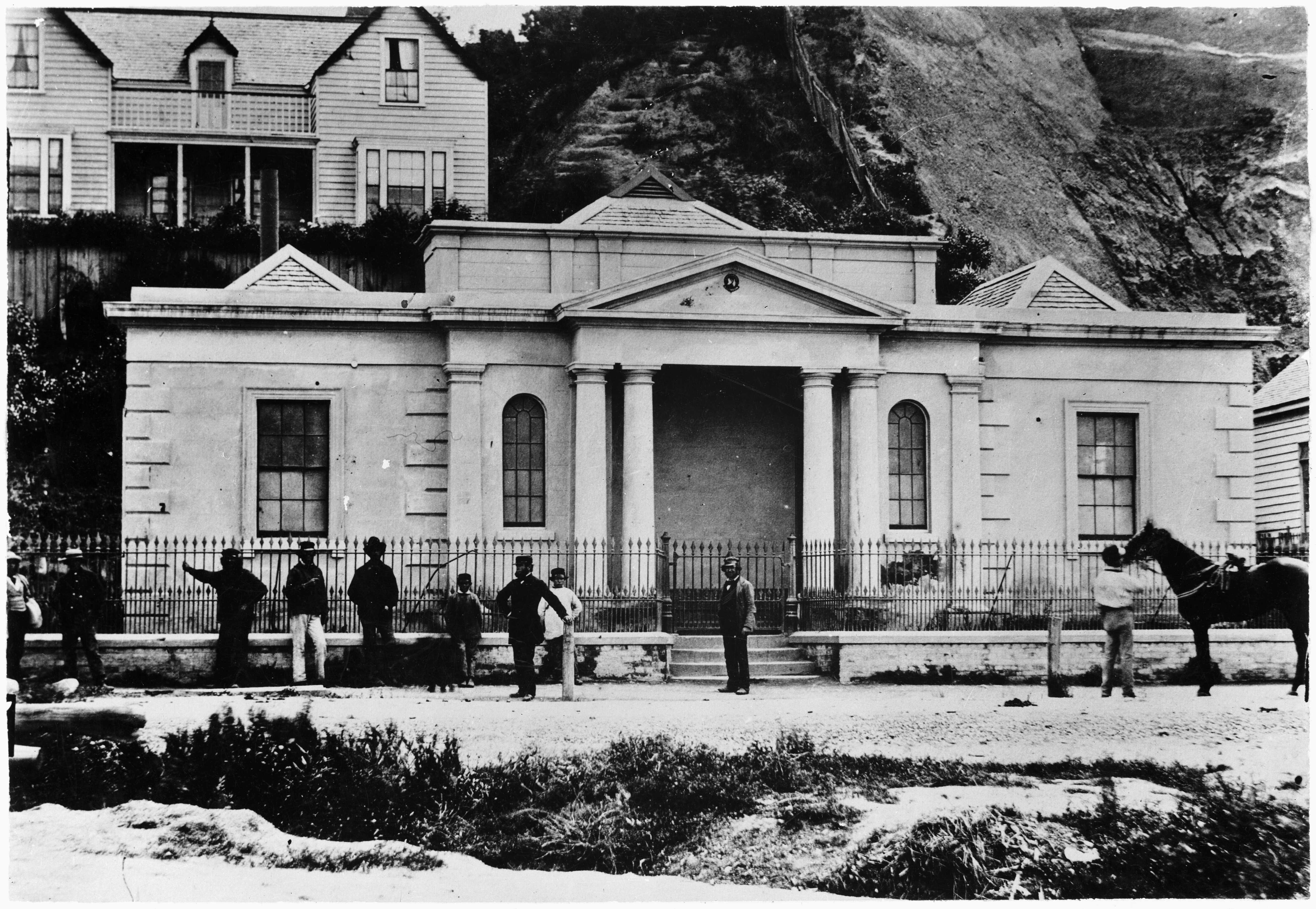
The Mechanics Institute athenaeum

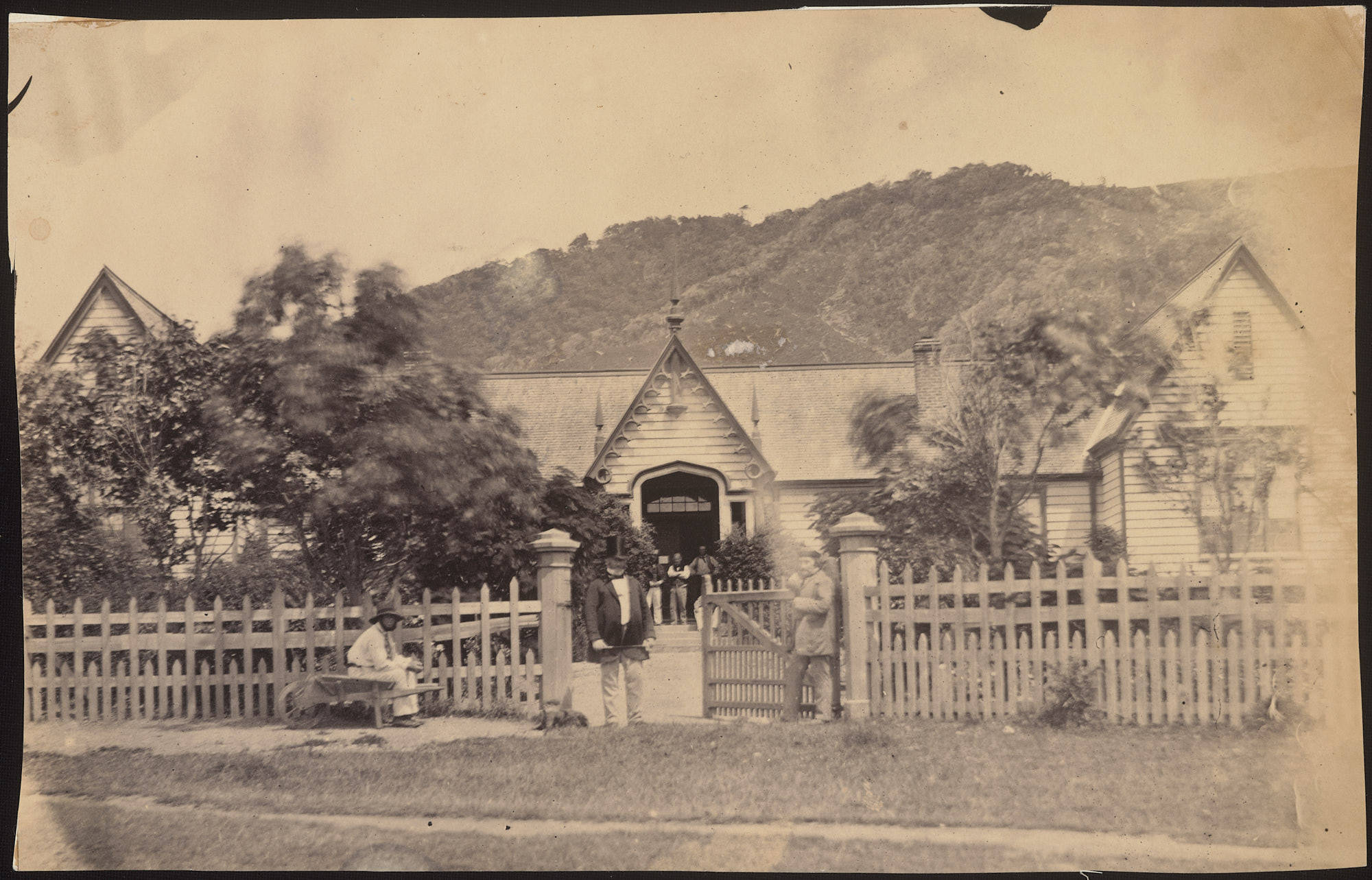
The Wellington Colonial Hospital

In 1848 Roberts designed a Wesleyan church, marking his earliest known work. Roberts designed the Mechanics Institute's athenaeum on Lambton Quay, opening in 1850. Roberts held multiple talks at the athenaeum including on pneumatics and electromagnetism. Roberts also submitted a design to a competition to fix the Hutt River bridge, which was at risk of collapse. The bridge later collapsed in the 1855 Wairarapa earthquake and Roberts designed the replacement. The bridge lasted until 1868. Roberts worked alongside Thomas Fitzgerald to design the Wellington Colonial Hospital (Note: Contemporary sources state Roberts took over the design), which opened in 1852. In 1852 he designed Pencarrow Lighthouse. The construction was put on hold until 1857. The lighthouse was prefabricated in England and was sent over to New Zealand in 1858 to be installed. 1849–1852 represented the zenith of his architectural career with six government buildings, a church, and hotel being designed during these years.

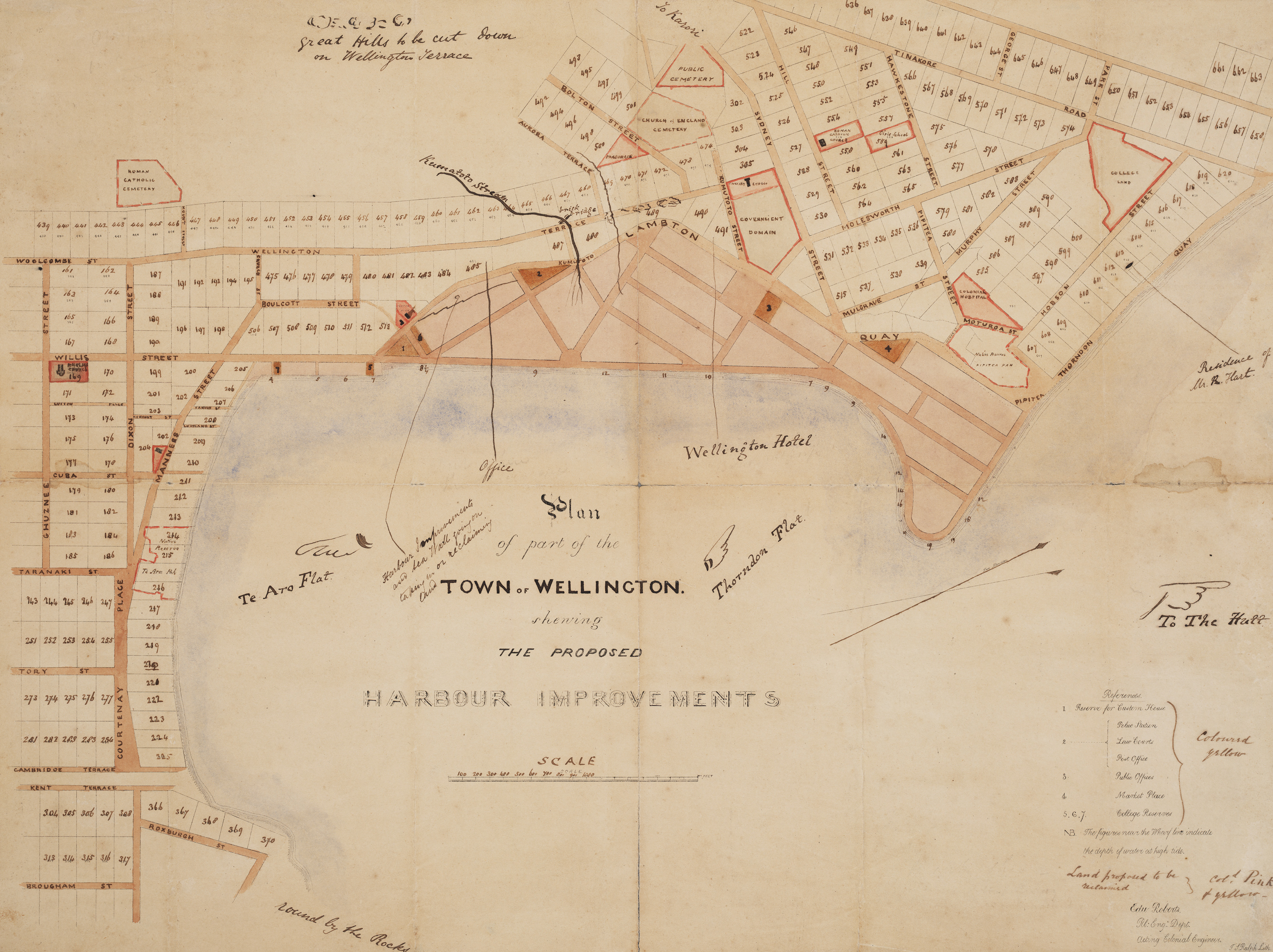
Robert's Wellington town plan and harbour reclamation proposal

According to Fredrick William Furkert in Early New Zealand Engineers was employed as colonial engineer from January 1851 to April 1855 but in June 1851 Roberts was reported as 'Government Architect' for his work developing the Barrett's Hotel ballroom into the legislative chamber for the General Legislative Council. The Blue Book for New Munster lists Roberts as working for both the provincial government and Royal Engineer Department, possibly explaining the discrepancy. In his role as an engineer Roberts was responsible for surveying damage caused by the 1848 Marlborough earthquake, including the Wellington Gaol at Mount Cook. Roberts designed the replacement gaol and described it as 'earthquake-proof'. Roberts also designed a town plan for Wellington in 1851 that included the first proposal for The reclamation of the Wellington Harbour. Roberts was involved with the 1852, 1853, and 1854 reclamations.

Roberts listed his house for sale in November 1855 with the listing saying Roberts was heading to England. Despite the listing Roberts did not immediately head to England as he was working as commissioner reporting on the 1855 Wairarapa earthquake. During the earthquake Roberts was surveying a stock track along the Turakirae coast at Mukamuka and reported his findings of the earth being raised as high as 9 ft (2.7 m) at Mukamuka. (Note: The highest uplift was 6.4 m (21 ft) at Barney's Whare about 6 km (3.7 mi) away.) Roberts was in correspondence with Charles Lyell, who used his information to give an account of the earthquake in the 10th edition of Principles of Geology. Roberts also provided information on the earthquake for Richard Taylor and his 1855 book Te Ika a Maui or New Zealand and its inhabitants. In 1856 Roberts was in England and was in London by March 1856 and remained until at least 1858. (Note: In March 1856 Roberts was interviewed by Charles Lyell in London. In 1858 a letter for Roberts was addressed to the Royal Engineers' Office at 11 James Street, Westminster, confirming his location in England specifically.) Roberts did not return to New Zealand.

c.1865 Roberts went to Gibraltar to work as engineer to the Sanitary Commissioner of Gibraltar. He still held this position in 1880 but the only other reference to Roberts is a letter published in a Royal Institute of British Architects journal about brick construction in Wellington in 1888, suggesting he had likely returned to London at some time after 1880. This letter was addressed to New Zealand readers about his design of a military barracks in Wellington that had used iron bars to seismically strengthen a brick building from an earthquake. Roberts' design of the barracks has been described as 'technically innovative' and a 'practical solution' by Robin Skinner.

== Personal life ==
After the New Zealand Society was founded in 1851 Roberts served as a committee member, with the committee first meeting at Roberts' office and the rules committee meeting at his home. Roberts was also a trustee of the Wellington Cemetery. Roberts was secretary for the New Zealand Society of Arts.

Roberts' wife died in 1880.
