= Pencarrow Lighthouse =

Lighthouse in New Zealand

Pencarrow Head Lighthouse
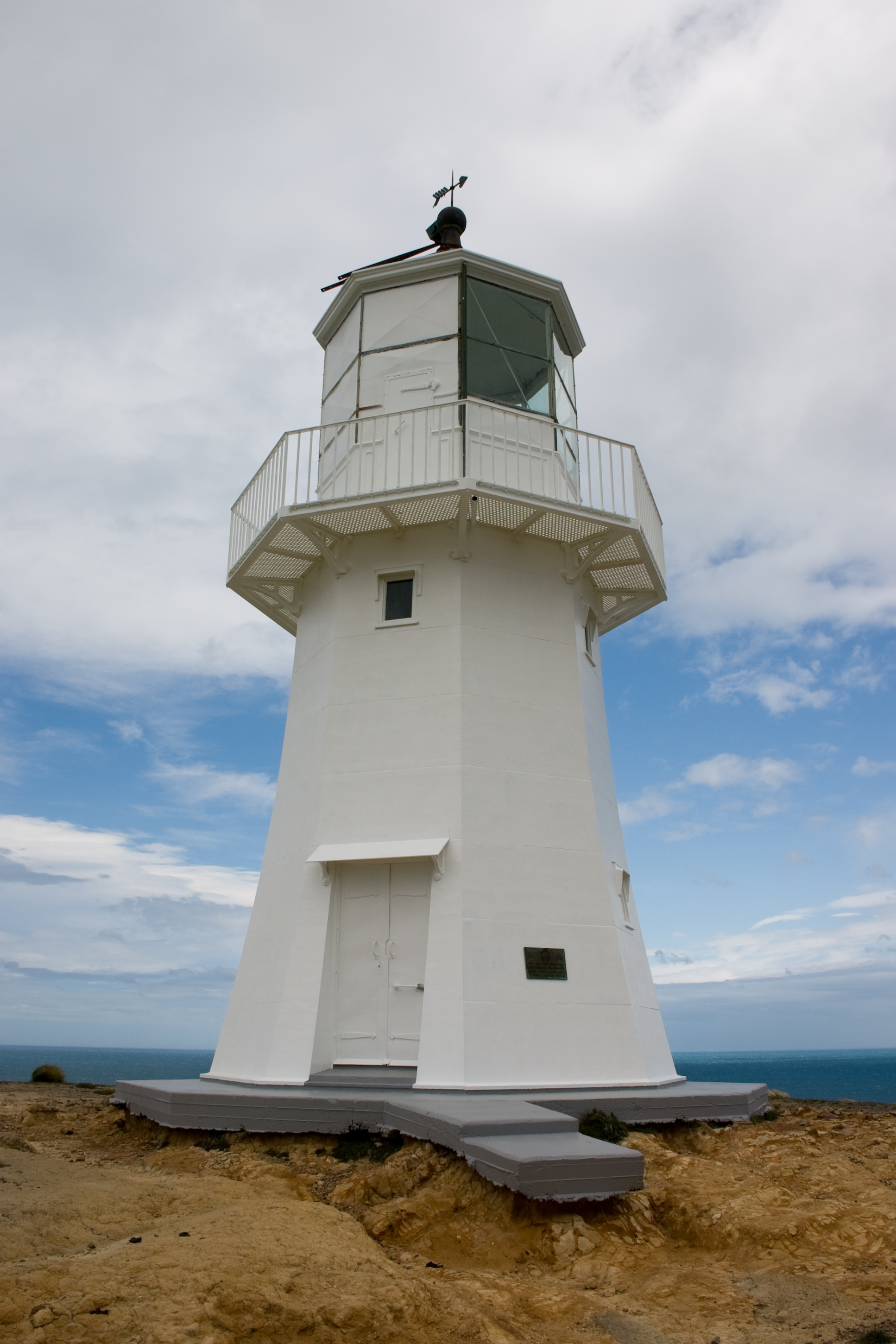
- Upper lighthouse (decommissioned)
- Location: Pencarrow Head; North Island; New Zealand
- Coordinates: 41°21′32″S 174°51′00″E

Tower
- Constructed: 1859
- Construction: cast iron tower
- Height: 11.5 metres (38 ft)
- Shape: tapered octagonal tower
- Markings: white tower and lantern, black lantern roof

Light
- First lit: 1859
- Deactivated: 1935
- Focal height: 108 metres (354 ft)

Heritage New Zealand – Category 1
- Official name: Pencarrow Lighthouse (former)
- Designated: 18 March 1982
- Reference no.: 34

Pencarrow Lighthouse, also known as Pencarrow Head Lighthouse, is a decommissioned lighthouse at Pencarrow Head in the Wellington region of the North Island of New Zealand.

== Upper lighthouse ==
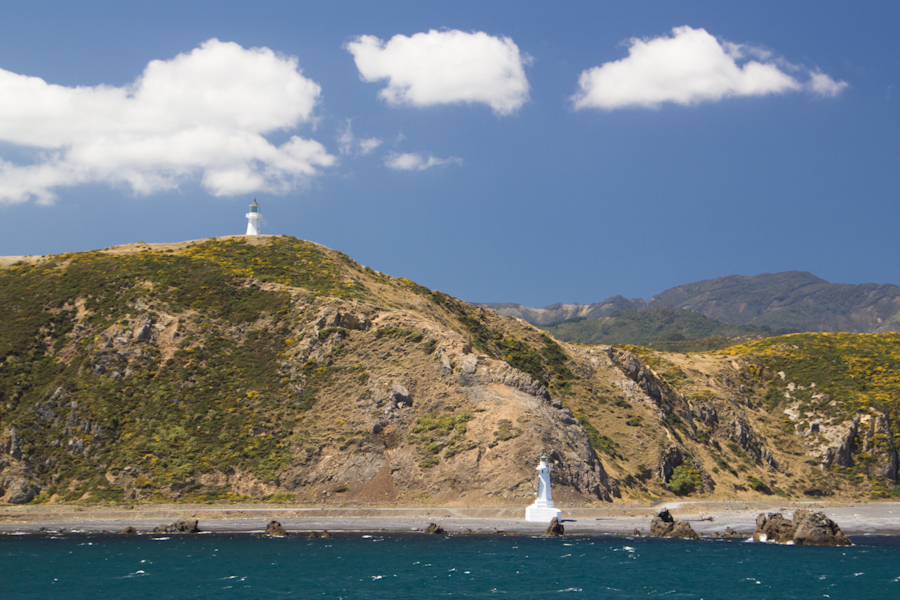
Upper light (decommissioned in 1935) and lower light (still in use)

Pencarrow Lighthouse was designed by Edward Roberts in 1852; however, construction was delayed until 1857. After its construction the Pencarrow Lighthouse was the first permanent lighthouse built in New Zealand. It was first lit on 1 January 1859. It was constructed from sections of cast iron that were shipped from England. Its first keeper, Mary Bennett, was the first and only female lighthouse keeper in New Zealand. The light was decommissioned in 1935 when it was replaced by the Baring Head Lighthouse.

The lighthouse is registered as a Category 1 Historic Place. It was the first structure in the Wellington area that was covered by a heritage order shortly after the New Zealand Historic Places Trust was established subsequent to the Historic Places Act 1954 having been passed. The Minister of Marine, Bill Fox, added a plaque at the lighthouse's centenary in 1959 to mark the occasion. The Marine Department transferred the land, which it had acquired from Wellington Province in 1865, to the Department of Lands and Survey in 1960. In 1966, the lighthouse itself was given to the New Zealand Historic Places Trust, which has managed the building since.

== Pencarrow Sector Light ==
A new low-level lighthouse was commissioned in 1906 due to the problem of the high-level lighthouse being frequently obscured by fog and cloud. This lighthouse is still in use.

== Access ==
The area has no road access; a reasonably flat walking or mountain biking track follows the coast line. The climb to the upper lighthouse is steep. A return journey takes about four hours on foot or one and a half hours by mountain bike.

== See also ==
- List of lighthouses in New Zealand
