= Historic Places Act 1993 =

Act of Parliament in New Zealand

New Zealand Parliament
- Long title: An Act— (a) To promote the identification, protection, preservation, and conservation of the historical and cultural heritage of New Zealand; and (b) To continue the New Zealand Historic Places Trust and the New Zealand Historic Places Board of Trustees with the functions and powers necessary for the full and proper attainment of the objectives of this Act; and (c) To establish the Maori Heritage Council; and (d) To amend and consolidate the Historic Places Act 1980
- Royal assent: 17 May 1993

Related legislation
- Historic Places Act 1954, Historic Places Act 1980, Resource Management Act 1991, Historic Places Act 1993

The Historic Places Act 1993 was an act of the New Zealand Parliament. It defines Heritage New Zealand and its roles of preserving, marking and recording places of historic interest in New Zealand.
