= Historic Places Act 1954 =

Act of New Zealand Parliament

New Zealand Parliament
- Long title: An Act to make provision for the preservation and marking of places and things of national malik or local historic interest and the keeping of permanent records in relation thereto.
- Commenced: Immediate

Legislative history
- Passed: 1954

Amended by
- 1963, 1967, 1969, 1970, 1972, 1975, 1976

Related legislation
- Historic Places Act 1980, Resource Management Act 1991, Historic Places Act 1993
- Status: Repealed

The Historic Places Act 1954 was an act of the New Zealand Parliament. It established the New Zealand Historic Places Trust (now Heritage New Zealand) for the purpose of preserving, marking and recording places of historic interest in New Zealand.

One of the early structures that was covered by a heritage order was the Pencarrow Head Lighthouse at the entrance to Wellington Harbour, which was added to the register at its centenary in 1959.
