= Michele Powles =

New Zealand writer (born 1976)

- Born: 1976 (age 49–50); Hawkes Bay, New Zealand
- Education: University of Auckland (MCW)
- Occupation: Writer
- Writing career
- Notable work: Weathered Bones
- Notable awards: Robert Burns Fellowship 2010
- Website: www.michelepowles.com

Michele Powles (born 1976) is a New Zealand novelist, playwright, and non-fiction writer.

== Background ==
Powles grew up in the Hawke's Bay. She studied law at Victoria University of Wellington and completed a Master's in Creative Writing at University of Auckland, under Witi Ihimaera. Powles is also a dancer and choreographer. She was the director of the 2008 NZ Book Month. Powles also held the Robert Burns Fellowship, at the University of Otago in 2010, due to the success of her first novel, Weathered Bones.

== Career ==
Powles has written one novel and two non-fiction books. Her first book, Touch Compass (2007), traces the lives and stories of the members of the dance company of the same name. Powles was the director of the performance touring company Rifleman Production Limited between 2006 and 2008.

New Zealand author Fiona Kidman describes Powles's first novel, Weathered Bones (2009), as "a book full of real women from an exciting new writer." Australia's Women's Weekly describes Weathered Bones as a "very contemporary" work that discusses "issues surrounding mental illness and the pain of love." Landfall gave Weathered Bones a positive review, labeling the novel's protagonist lighthouse keeper Mary Jane Bennett "one of New Zealand's earliest feminists." Powell went on to write the short story "Caged" for the Landfall Autumn 2012 issue. She also wrote a series of articles for Stuff.co.nz about building her family home in West Auckland in 2015.

Powles's latest book, When We Remember to Breathe (2018), is a collaboration with poet and playwright Renee Liang. The book traces the conversations of the two writers in the early stages of pregnancy. Both writers committed themselves to writing one paragraph a week during their pregnancy. Powles and Liang describe their work as "lay[ing] bare the raw joy, beauty, discomfort and humour of modern motherhood." A share of the book's profits were given to the charity organisation Good Bitches Baking.

Powles has written the screenplay for a New Zealand film in development, Tenderwood, directed by Alyx Duncan and produced by Firefly Films. The films current synopsis is: "An estranged daughter tries to reconnect with her belligerent mother whose mysterious illness leaves her stuck in the centre of the room – both women must accept that the mother may be turning into a tree."

== Works ==
- Touch Compass (David Ling Publishing Limited, 2007) ISBN 978-1877378171
- Weathered Bones (Penguin Group [NZ], 2009) ISBN 978-0143011248
- "Caged," a short story in Landfall 223, Otago University Press, 2012 (NZ)
- When We Remember to Breathe (co-authored with Renee Liang) (Magpie, 2018) ISBN 978-0473453398
