= Antrim House =

Historic house in Wellington, New Zealand

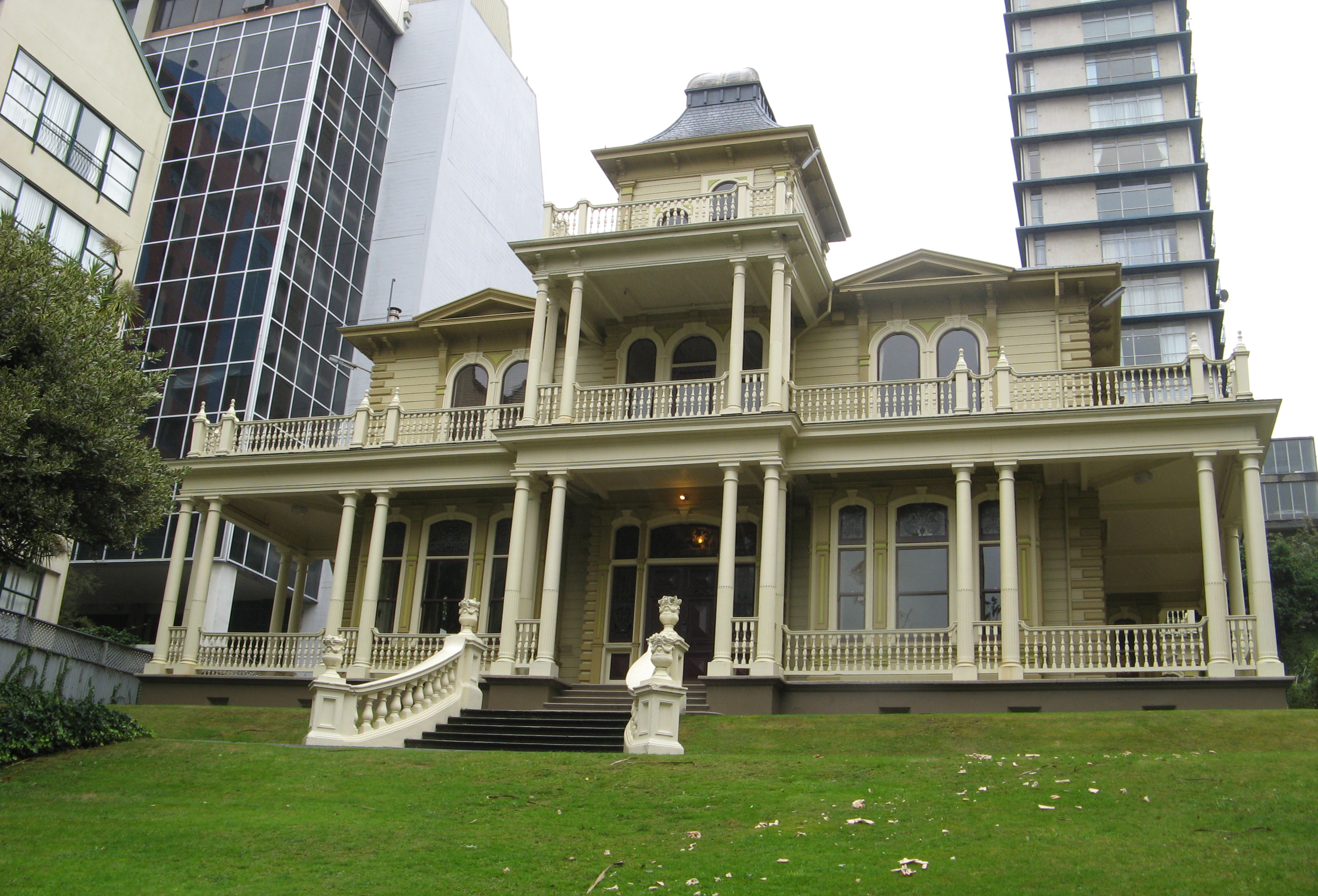

- Location within New Zealand Wellington

General information
- Architectural style: Italianate
- Location: 63 Boulcott Street, Wellington, New Zealand
- Coordinates: 41.28684°S 174.77382°E
- Named for: County Antrim
- Owner: Heritage New Zealand

Design and construction
- Architect: William Turnbull

Website
- www.heritage.org.nz/places/places-to-visit/wellington-region/antrim-house

Heritage New Zealand – Category 1
- Designated: 26 November 1981
- Reference no.: 208

Antrim House is a historic Italianate house located in Wellington, New Zealand registered as a category 1 building by Heritage New Zealand. Antrim House was built as the home for Robert Hannah and his family.

== Description ==
Antrim House is a two-storey, 18-room Italianate building largely constructed from tōtara. The building has a central tower which had an ornate iron crown. It initially overlooked the Wellington Harbour but today it is surrounded by high-rise buildings. The interior has pressed metal ceilings; hand-crafted kauri panels and staircase; and leadlight and stained glass windows.

== History ==
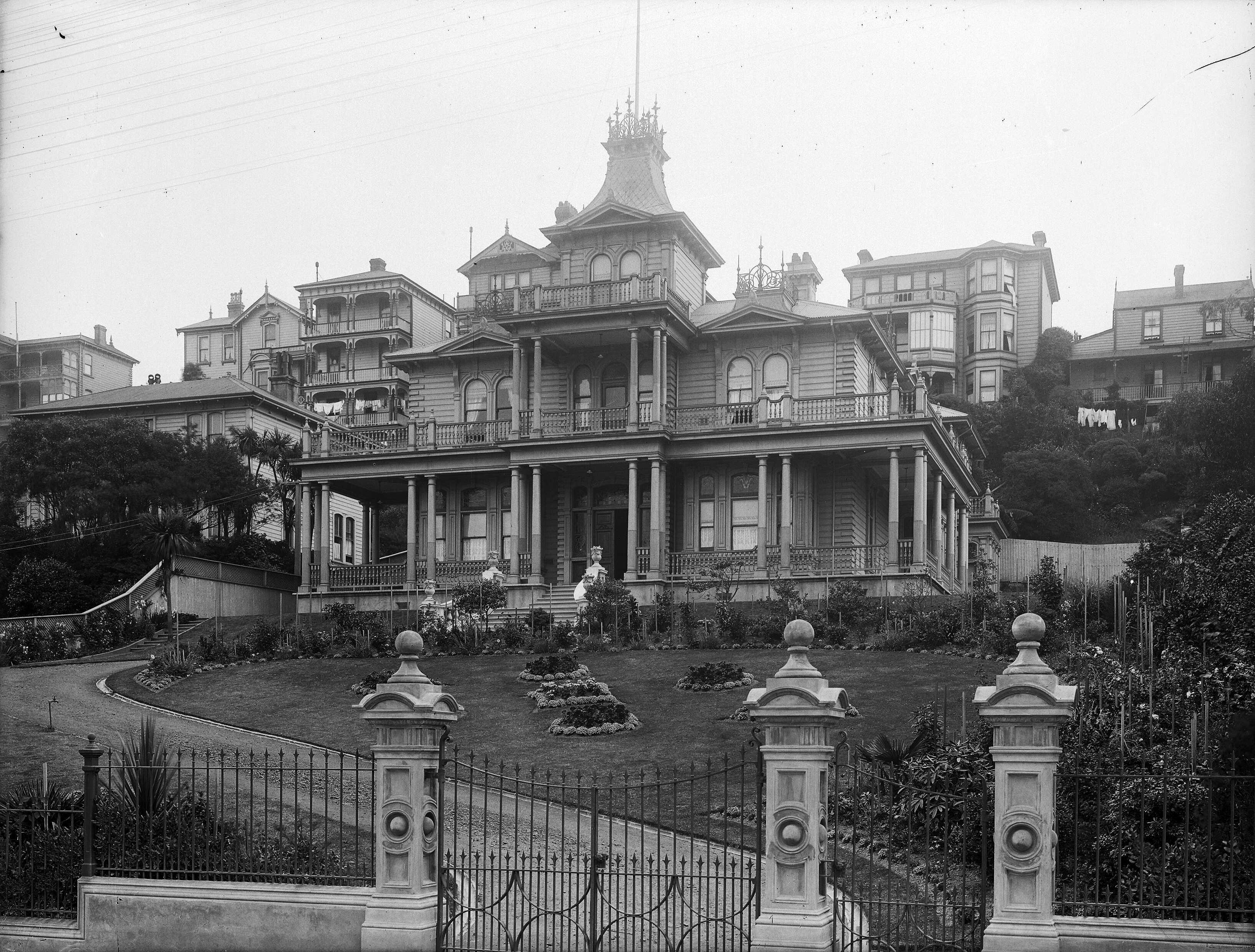
Antrim House, 1906

=== Background ===
Robert Hannah trained as an apprentice to a cobbler. He later opened a shoe store in Lambton Quay in 1874. Due to the import duty his business grew well and in 1893 he had ten stores and a factory.

=== Antrim House ===
Antrim House was built on Boulcott Street in 1905 for Robert Hannah and his family. Hannah had commissioned Thomas Turnbull and Sons and William Turnbull designed the home in an Italianate style. Hannah named the property after County Antrim, his home county.

=== Later use ===
After the death of Hannah in 1930 the Antrim House was leased as a hotel. In 1938 it was sold and continued use as a hotel until 1949, when it would be purchased by the government as accommodation for important visitors, this did not go ahead and instead it was used as a hostel for public servants. In 1940 the interior was damaged in a fire. Due to war shortages the interior was remade in Art Deco style. In 1977 the hostel closed and the government agreed for the building to become the headquarters of the New Zealand Historic Places Trust. Following this extensive renovation work took place to ready the property for use.

From October 2022 through May 2024, the building underwent renovation again, mainly for seismic strengthening, replacing the roof, and repainting the building. The dome of the building was reconstructed by a roofing specialist who had worked on the Palace of Versailles. Butterfly joints were used to strengthen the original totara weatherboards as required.

== Cultural Heritage ==
Later the house was owned by New Zealand Historic Places Trust, now Heritage New Zealand. The organisation has both restored features of this now rare town residence, and it is currently their central office. What was once a site bordered by other homes is now encased by postmodern structures.

The building is classified as a Category 1 Historic Place ("places of 'special or outstanding historical or cultural heritage significance or value'") historic place by Heritage New Zealand Pouhere Taonga.

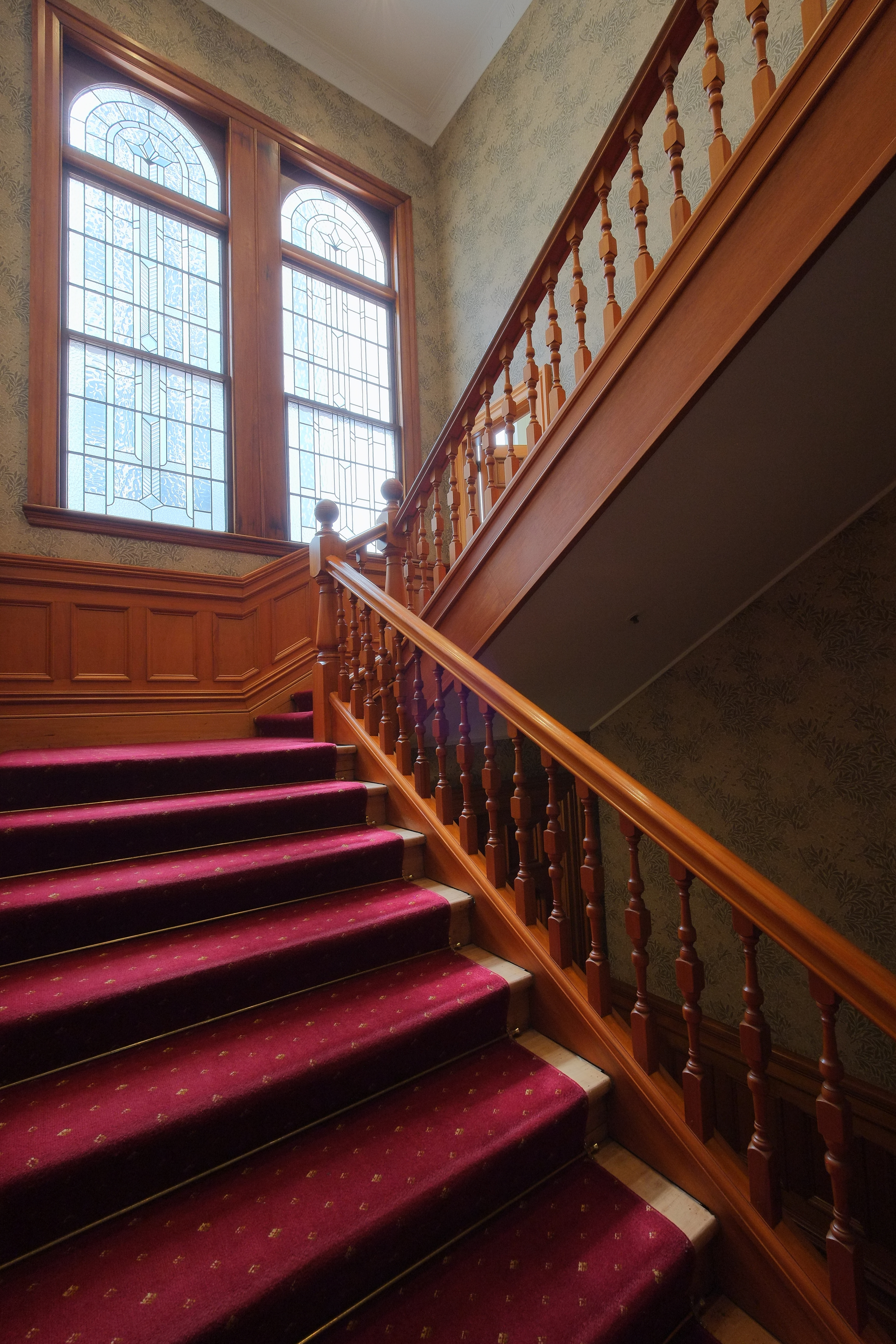
Art Deco replacement window after 1940 fire.

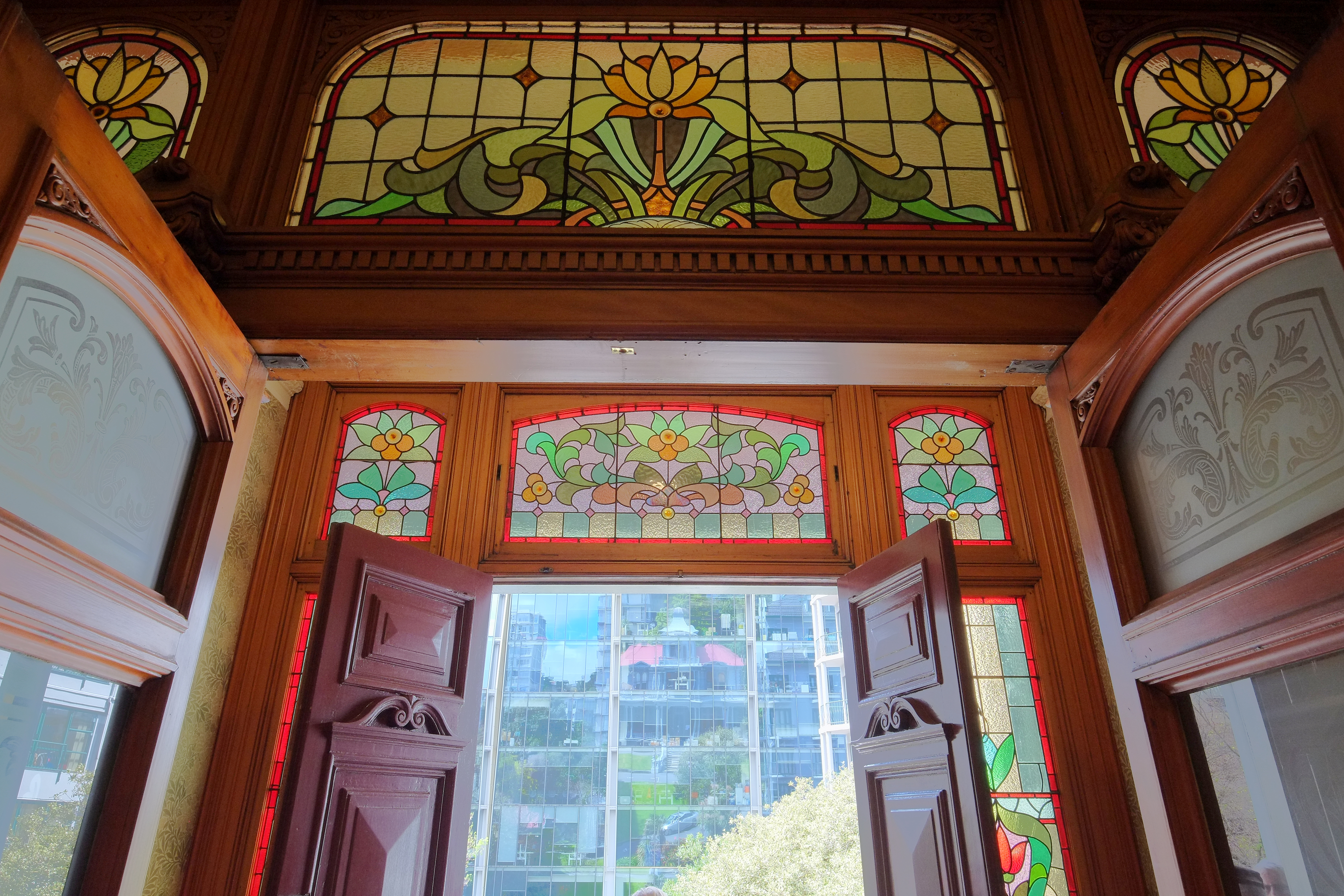
Stained glass windows above Antrim House's main entrance.

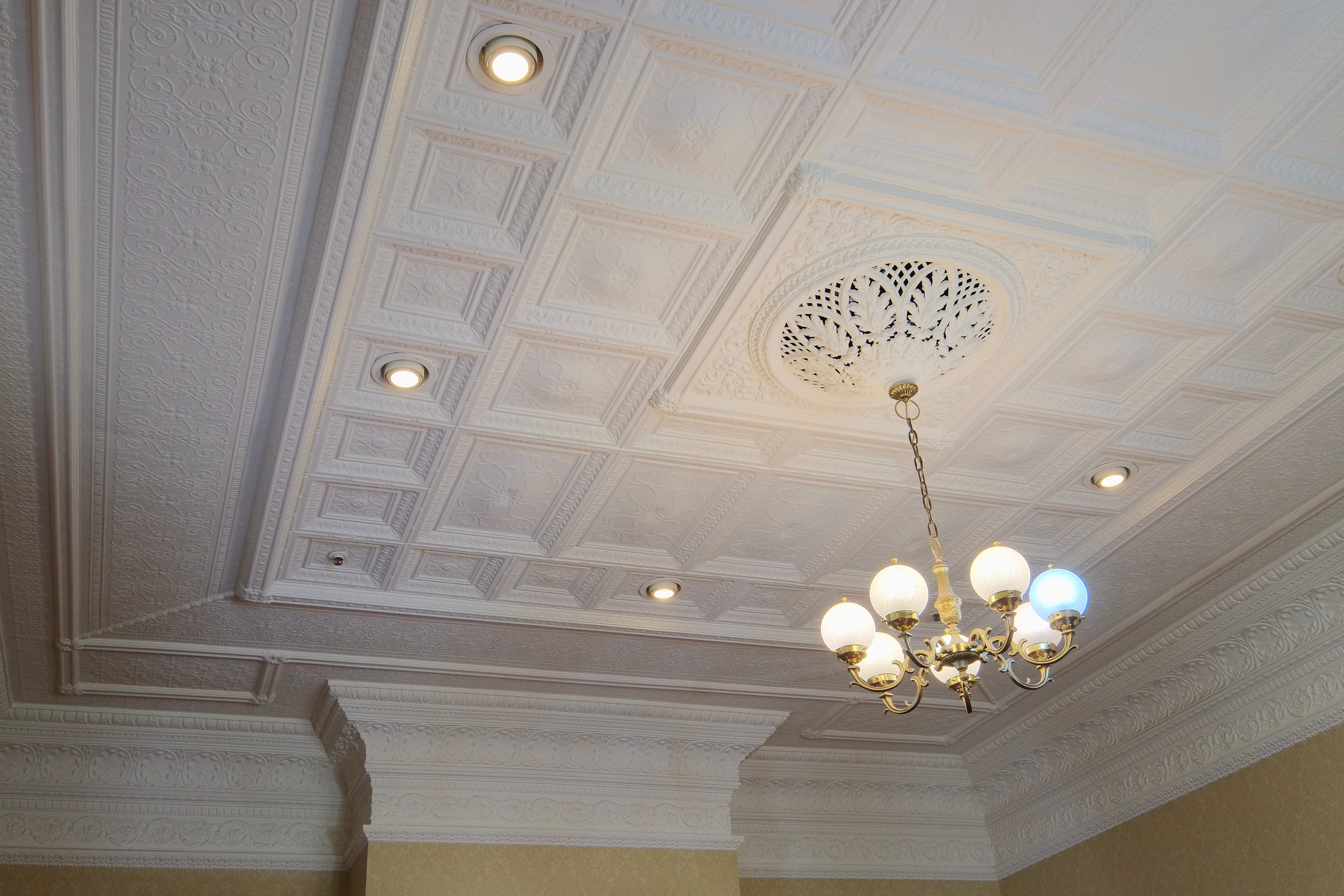
Embossed pressed tin ceiling in Drawing Room of Antrim House; the ceiling was made by the Wunderlich Co. of Sydney in 1905.
