= Mary Bennett (lighthouse keeper) =

New Zealand lighthouse keeper

Mary Jane Bennett (née Hebden, 1816 – 6 July 1885) was the first official lighthouse keeper in New Zealand, and the only woman to ever hold the role.

Hebden emigrated to New Zealand in 1840 and was soon married to George White Bennett who farmed at Lowry Bay and worked as a clerk in Wellington. They had five children born between 1842 and 1855.

In 1852 George took the position of lighthouse keeper at Pencarrow Head. Living conditions at the lighthouse were hard: the house was not weatherproof, wood and water had to be carried from some distance away and winds battered the house. Following the death of her husband who drowned in 1855, she continued to operate the lighthouse. Better housing may have been the reason for her remaining and taking over the lighthouse keeping. In January 1859 a proper lighthouse was built and Bennett was officially appointed as keeper. Pencarrow Lighthouse was the first permanent lighthouse in New Zealand.

Bennett was assisted in her duties by William Lyall and performed well in the job. She left in about 1865 and returned to England where she died in 1885.

Three of her children George, Francis and William later returned to New Zealand. William became assistant keeper of the lighthouse in 1880. He died in 1929.

The story of Bennett's life has inspired three books: a children's book Lucy goes to the lighthouse by Grant Sheehan and Rosalind Clark, Weathered Bones by Michele Powles and Guiding Lights: Extraordinary Lives of Lighthouse Women by Shona Riddell.

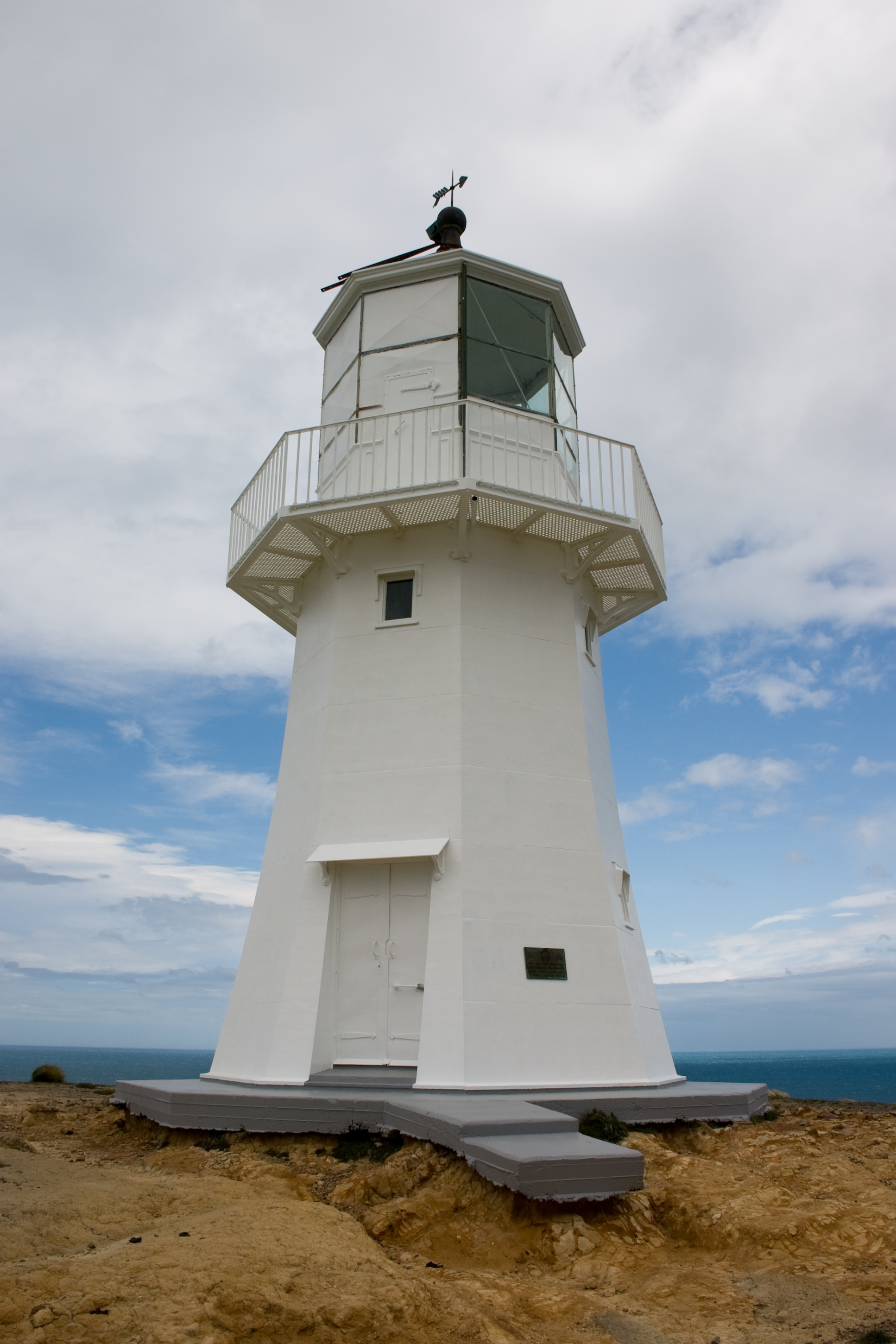
The lighthouse at Pencarrow Head
