= Alexander Turnbull (bibliophile) =

New Zealand merchant and collector (1868–1918)

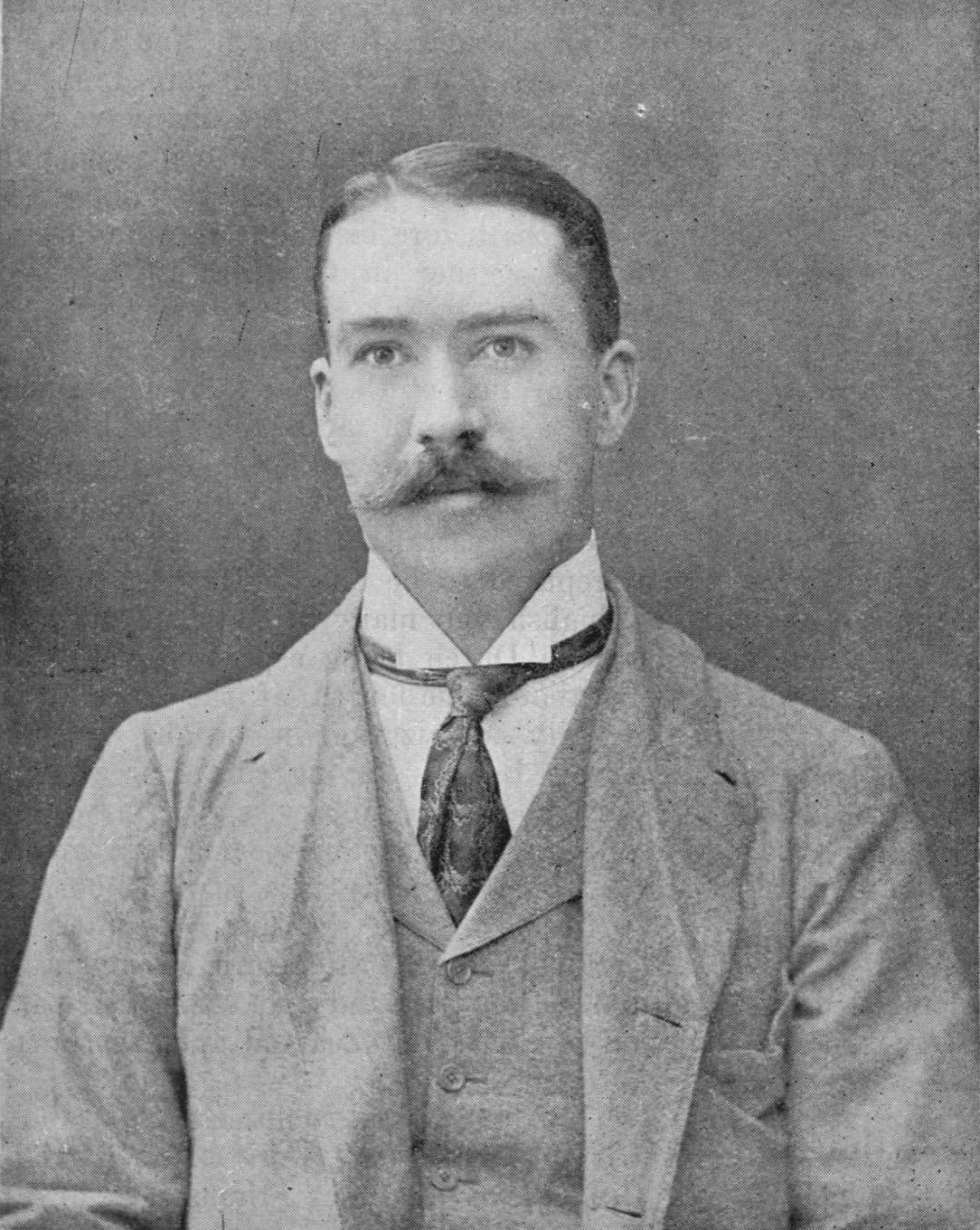
- Alexander Horsburgh Turnbull
- Born: 14 September 1868
- Died: 28 June 1918 (aged 49)
- Burial place: Bolton Street Memorial Park, Wellington
- Known for: Collecting many of the items which formed the basis of the New Zealand National Library collection Turnbull House

Alexander Horsburgh Turnbull (14 September 1868 – 28 June 1918) was a New Zealand merchant, dandy and book collector. On his death, his collection became the nucleus of the Alexander Turnbull Collection, initially housed in his residence, Turnbull House, but as of 1987 housed with the collections of the National Library of New Zealand, a body formed in 1965 by the amalgamation of three libraries, including the one bearing Turnbull's name. In 1913 Turnbull anonymously donated his Māori and Pacific artefacts to the Dominion Museum (now the Museum of New Zealand Te Papa Tongarewa).

== Biography ==
Born in Wellington to Scottish merchant Walter Turnbull (1823–1897) and his wife Alexandrina Horsburgh (1827–1896), Turnbull grew up in Wellington but the family moved to London in 1881, where he attended Dulwich College. His brother Robert attended Wellington College, Berkshire. Two brothers Walter (born 1862) and William (born 1863) drowned in the River Tweed, Scotland on 1 September 1871. He had three other siblings, Isabella Thornburn (born 1858), John Horsburgh (born 1860), and Joanna Elizabeth (born 1870).

By the time he returned permanently to New Zealand in 1892, joining his father's merchandising firm, he was already collecting books. His particular interests were New Zealand, Pacific exploration, Scottish history, English literature, the art critic John Ruskin, and the poet John Milton. Turnbull had a standing order with the London bookseller Bernard Quaritch, which was regularly updated to include more subjects. An analysis of Turnbull's collecting history has been explored through his correspondence with book sellers in Australasia, the United Kingdom, America, and continental Europe.

Turnbull also made a collection of New Zealand art, which he began by purchasing a group of watercolours of New Zealand flowers by Georgina Burne Hetley.

According to the Dictionary of New Zealand Biography, "W. & G. Turnbull and Company became a limited liability company in 1913, and was sold to Wright Stephenson and Company of Dunedin in 1916. Turnbull retired from business but remained heavily involved in the family's difficult financial affairs. He died in Bowen Street Hospital in Wellington on 28 June 1918 after an operation on his sinuses. Turnbull never married; he was survived by his sister, Joanna (later Lady Leigh-Wood) and his brother, Robert Thorburn Turnbull, founder of the firm Turnbull and Jones."

He was buried alongside his parents, at Bolton Street Memorial Park, the oldest cemetery in Wellington but his remains and those of his family were later disinterred and moved into a common vault for the construction of the Wellington Urban Motorway. However, the headstone to the grave was shifted to a new location at the edge of the cemetery and it remains there as a memorial.

== Legacy ==
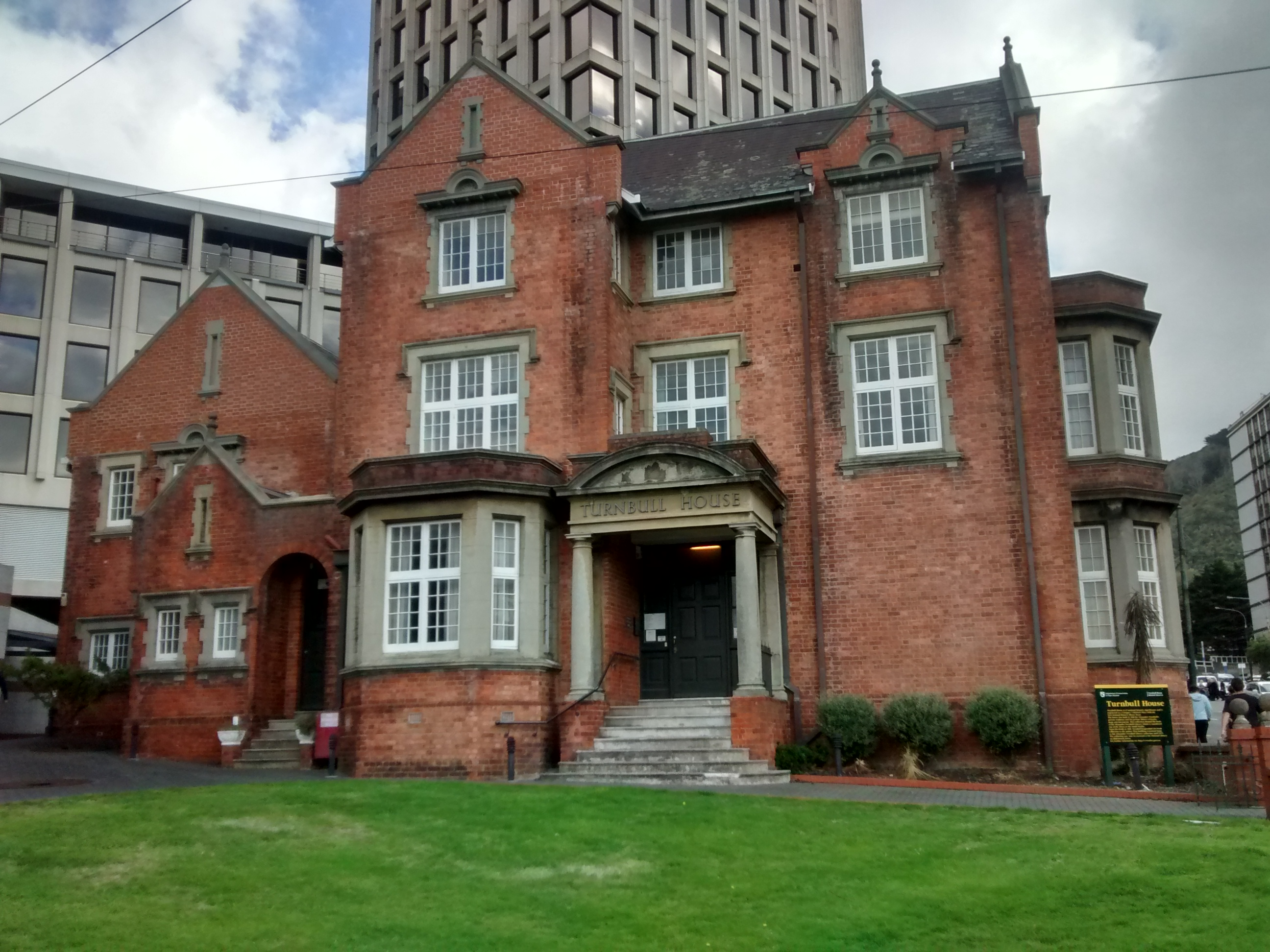
Turnbull House in Wellington

After his death, Turnbull's collection contained approximately 55,000 books, as well as manuscripts, photographs, paintings and sketches (the artefacts having already been given to the Dominion Museum). The collection is no longer housed in his purpose-built house (which is now in the care of Department of Conservation and is known as Turnbull House), but in the same building as the other collections held by the National Library. Turnbull's Milton collection continues to be added to, by purchase and donation; a number of significant additions were made in the 1970s.
