= Heritage New Zealand =

Crown entity of New Zealand

- Pouhere Taonga
- New Zealand Historic Places Trust logo
- Type: Crown entity
- Purpose: Protecting New Zealand's heritage
- Headquarters: Antrim House, Boulcott Street
- Location: Wellington, New Zealand
- Region served: New Zealand
- Chair: Hon. Marian Hobbs
- Main organ: Board of Trustees
- Affiliations: Minister for Arts, Culture and Heritage; Ministry for Culture and Heritage; Department of Conservation; Te Puni Kōkiri
- Budget: NZ$12,975,000
- Website: www.heritage.org.nz

Heritage New Zealand Pouhere Taonga (initially the National Historic Places Trust and then, from 1963 to 2014, the New Zealand Historic Places Trust; in Māori: Pouhere Taonga) is a Crown entity that advocates for the protection of ancestral sites and heritage buildings in New Zealand. It was set up through the Historic Places Act 1954 with a mission to "...promote the identification, protection, preservation and conservation of the historical and cultural heritage of New Zealand" and is an autonomous Crown entity. Its current enabling legislation is the Heritage New Zealand Pouhere Taonga Act 2014.

== History ==
Charles Bathurst, 1st Viscount Bledisloe, gifted the site where the Treaty of Waitangi was signed to the nation in 1932. The subsequent administration through the Waitangi Trust is sometimes seen as the beginning of formal heritage protection in New Zealand. Public discussion about heritage protection occurred in 1940 in conjunction with the centenary of the signing of the Treaty of Waitangi. The purchase of Pompallier House in 1943 by the government further raised the issue of how historic buildings should be cared for.

Duncan Rae, the MP representing the Parnell electorate, suggested that a heritage organisation should be set up and put in a private member's bill. Whilst this did not proceed, the First National Government (of which he was a member) took responsibility of the issue and the Historic Places Act 1954 was passed, which established the National Historic Places Trust as a non-governmental organisation (NGO). The trust was governed by a 12-member board plus a chairman, and they first met in 1955. The National Historic Places Trust came under the responsibility of the Minister of Internal Affairs. The composition of the board was defined in the legislation and the board was appointed on the recommendation of the minister. The name of the organisation was changed to New Zealand Historic Places Trust in 1963. In 1970 the Building Classification Committee was established to create a register for archaeological sites. In 1980 the Historic Places Act was passed establishing a list for historic buildings.

Early work undertaken by the trust included the recording of Māori rock paintings, as some sites were to be submerged, e.g. through the Waipapa Dam and Benmore Dam. In 1961, the trust bought Te Waimate mission, the second-oldest building in New Zealand.

In 2004, the New Zealand Historic Places Trust became an autonomous Crown entity. On 14 April 2014, the organisation's name changed to "Heritage New Zealand". Later that year, the enabling legislation—Heritage New Zealand Pouhere Taonga Act 2014—was passed. There were changes in governance introduced by the new legislation, e.g. the branch committees were dispensed with. The legislation, which came into effect on 20 May 2014, also finished the transition from an NGO to a crown entity.

== Governance ==
It is governed by a board, appointed by the Minister for Arts, Culture and Heritage and currently chaired by Hon. Marian Hobbs, and a Māori Heritage Council, currently chaired by Sir John Clarke. Past chairs include Dame Anne Salmond. The head office is in Antrim House, Wellington, while regional and area offices are in Kerikeri, Auckland, Tauranga, Wellington, Christchurch and Dunedin.

== Publication ==
It publishes the quarterly magazine Heritage New Zealand.

== Listings ==
Buildings owned by Heritage New Zealand include the Kerikeri Mission House, the Stone Store, Hurworth Cottage, Te Waimate Mission house, and Clendon House, the Rawene residence of James Reddy Clendon. It also owns the site of the Alexandra Redoubt in Pirongia. Additionally, the Clendon family papers and document stored at the house were inscribed on the UNESCO Memory of the World Aotearoa New Zealand Ngā Mahara o te Ao register.

== New Zealand Heritage List / Rārangi Kōrero ==
The New Zealand Heritage List / Rārangi Kōrero (formerly known as the Register) is divided into five main areas:

- Historic Places
- Historic Areas
- Wāhi Tapu (Māori sacred sites)
- Wāhi Tapu Areas
- Wāhi Tūpuna – places important to Māori for ancestral significance and associated cultural and traditional values

The historic places are organised in two categories:

- Category 1 – "...places of 'special or outstanding historical or cultural heritage significance or value'"
- Category 2 – "...places of 'historical or cultural heritage significance or value'"

The register contains over 6,000 entries. The Canterbury earthquakes of September 2010 and February 2011 resulted in damage to a number of historic buildings in Christchurch. Post-earthquake redevelopment has caused a significant loss of heritage buildings in Christchurch.

== Māori Heritage Council ==
The Māori Heritage Council (MHC) sits within Heritage New Zealand Pouhere Taonga and was established by the Historic Places Act 1993. The functions of the Council include:

- the protection and registration of wāhi tapu and wāhi tapu areas
- assisting the Trust to develop and reflect a bicultural view in the exercise of its powers and functions
- providing assistance to whānau, hapū and iwi in the preservation and management of their heritage resources
- consideration of recommendations in relation to archaeological sites
- advocacy of the interests of the Trust and Council so far as they relate to Māori heritage at any public or Māori forum.

As of 2014 Sir John Clarke is the chair of the MHC.

== Gallery ==
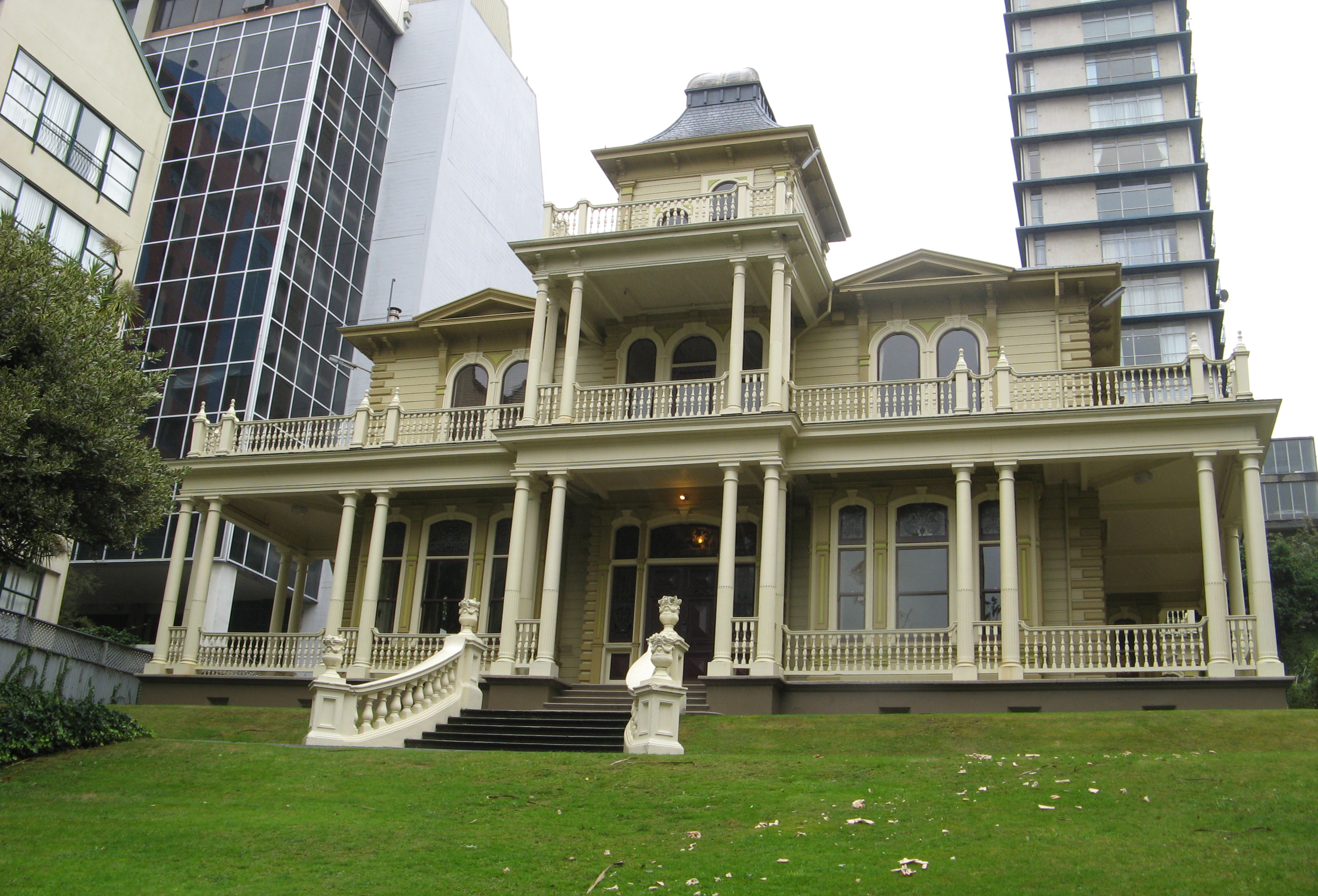
Antrim House, Wellington

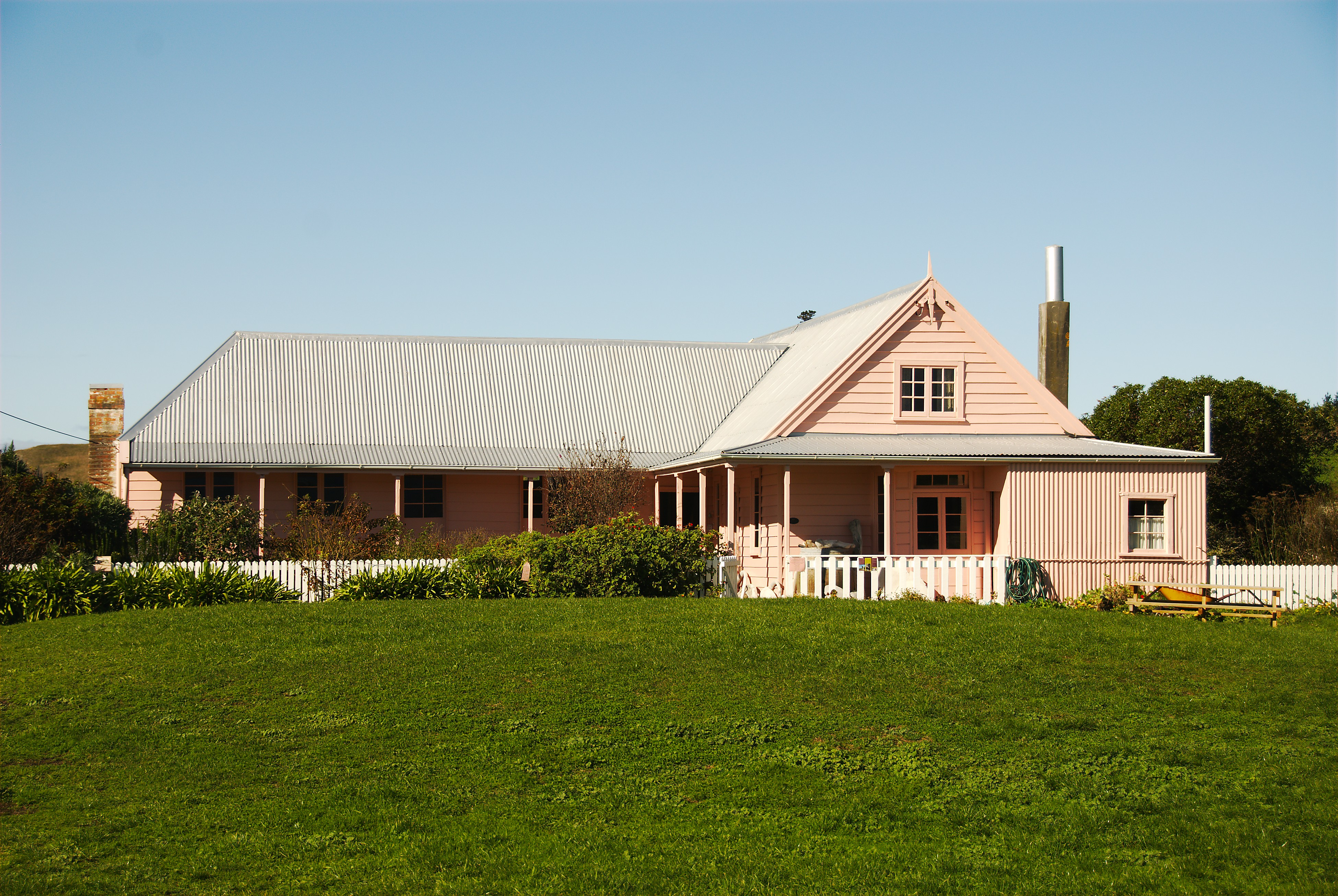
Fyffe House, Kaikōura

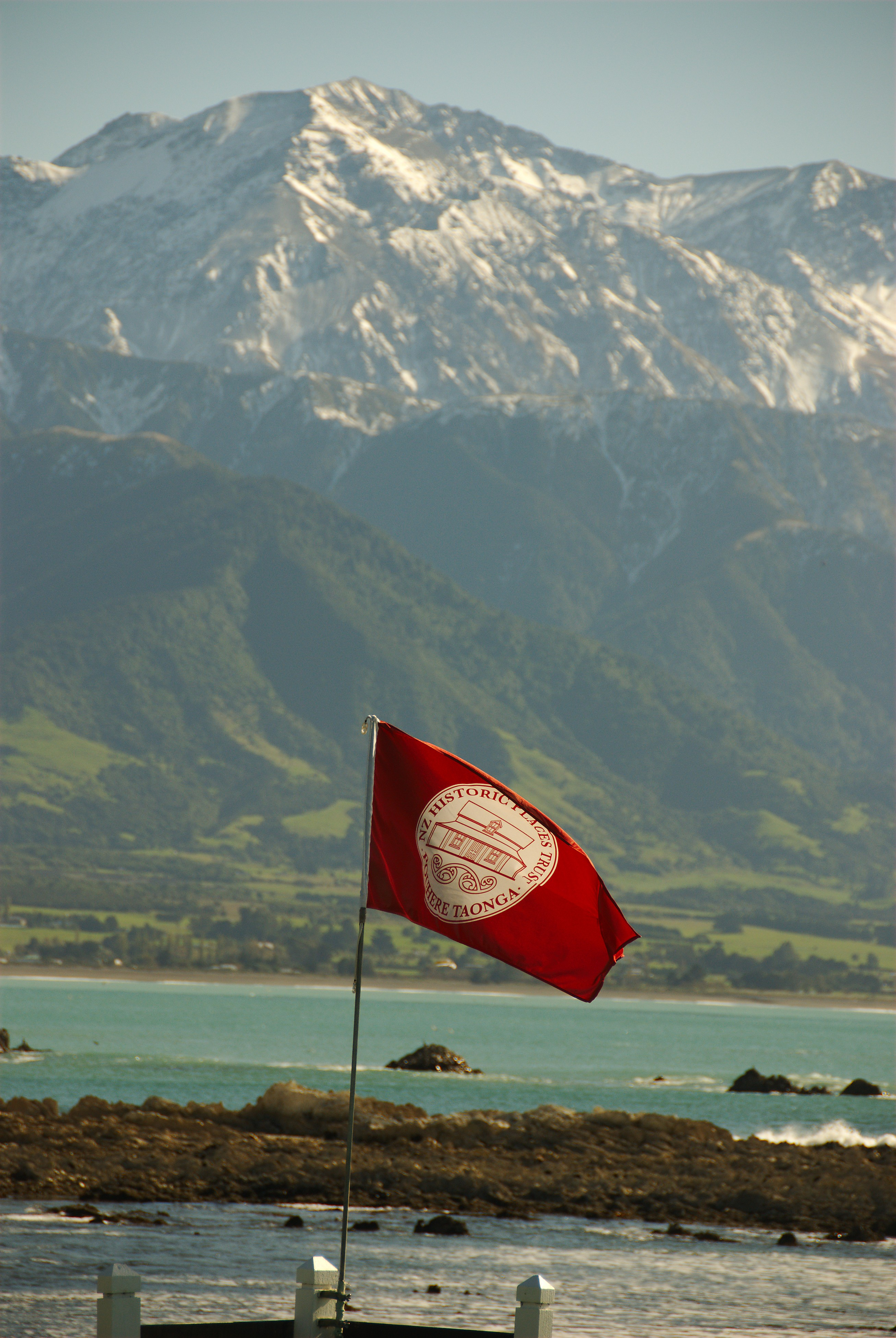
The flag of the Historic Places Trust flying outside Fyffe House in Kaikōura

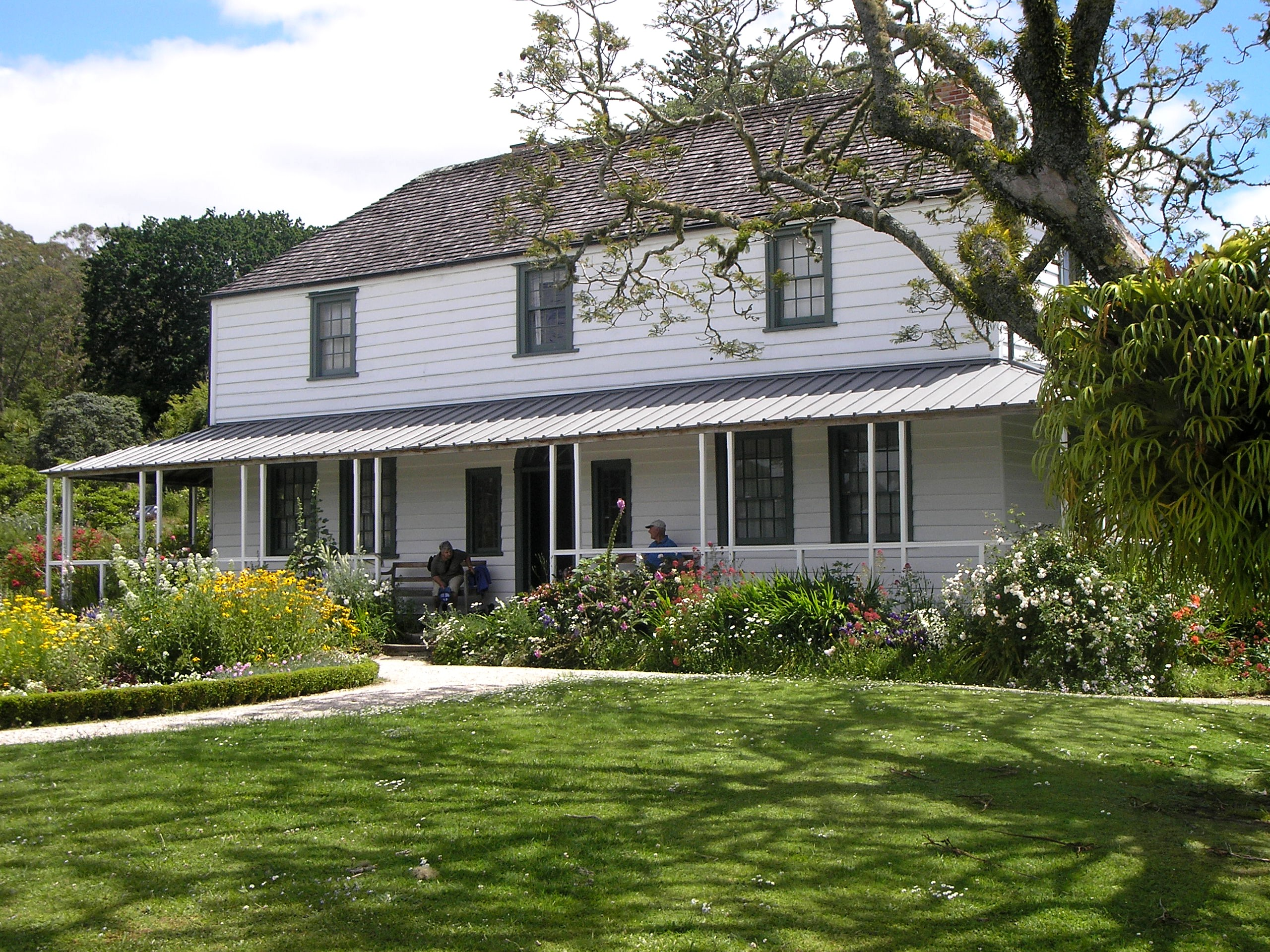
Mission House, Kerikeri

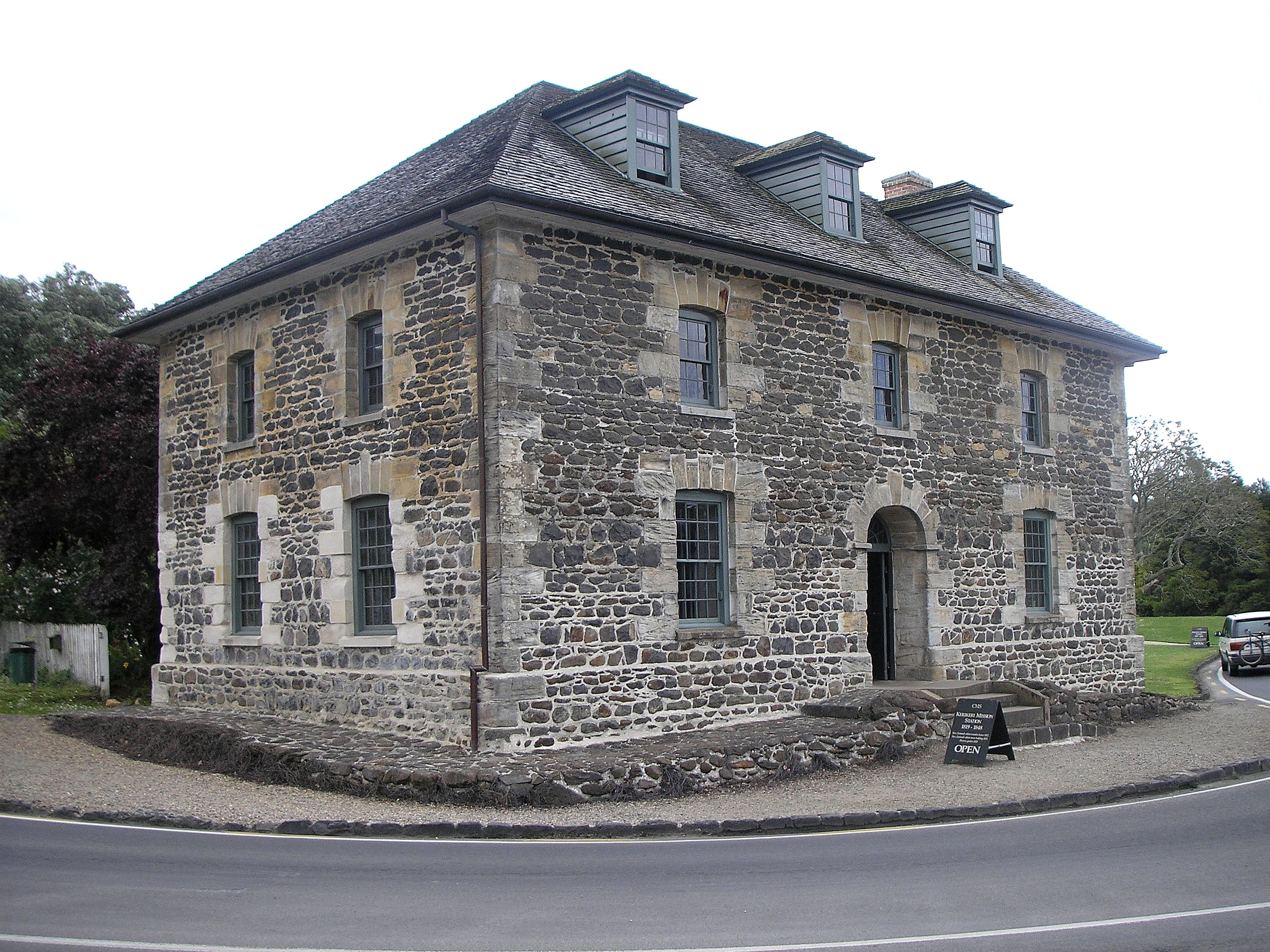
Stone Store, Kerikeri

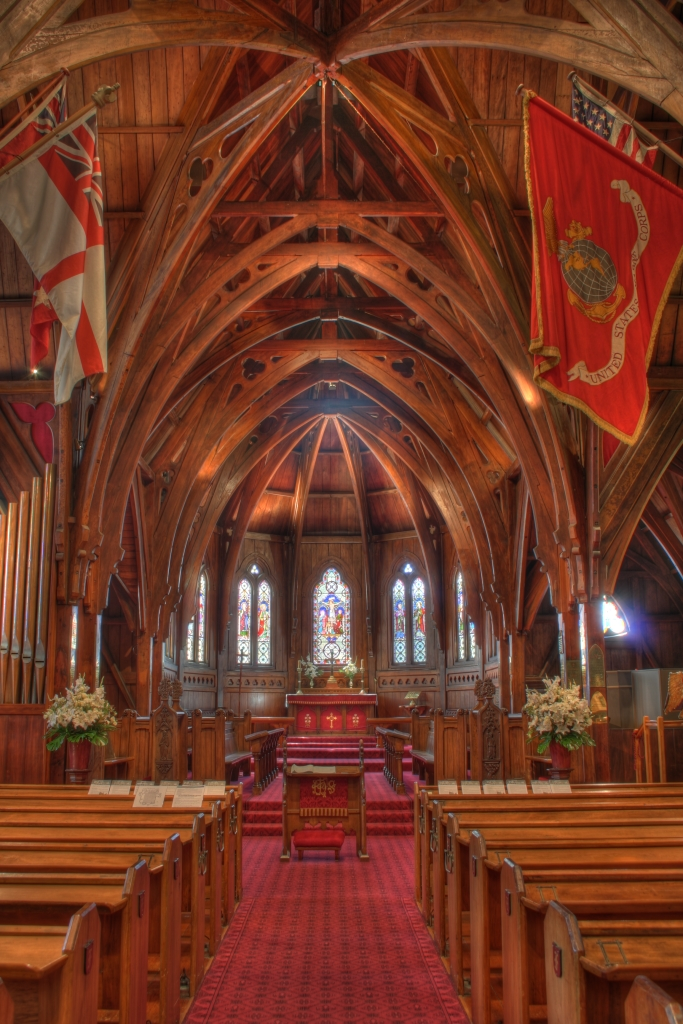
Old St Paul's, Wellington

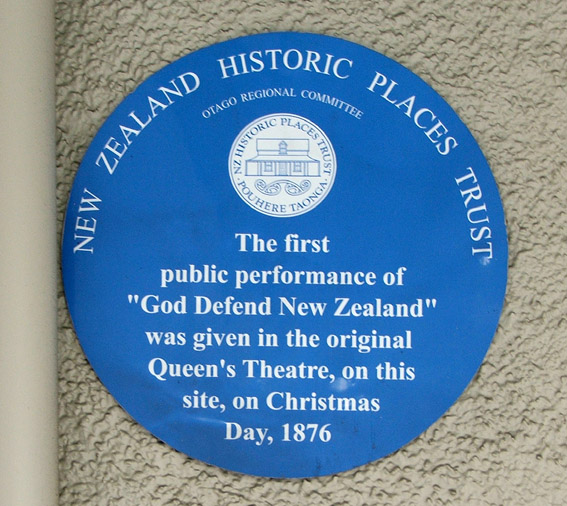
Historic Places Trust blue plaque in Dunedin at the site of the first performance of God Defend New Zealand

== Equivalent function outside New Zealand ==
- France – Monument historique
- Germany – Deutsche Stiftung Denkmalschutz and National Heritage Sites (Kulturdenkmal)
- Hong Kong – Historic building, see List of Grade I historic buildings in Hong Kong, List of Grade II historic buildings in Hong Kong and List of Grade III historic buildings in Hong Kong
- Netherlands – Rijksmonument
- United Kingdom – Listed building or Scheduled Ancient Monument
- United States – National Register of Historic Places and National Historic Landmark

== See also ==
- SAHANZ (Society of Architectural Historians of Australia and New Zealand)
- Category:Heritage New Zealand
- Category:Lists of historic places in New Zealand
