= East Harbour Regional Park =

Regional park in Lower Hutt, Wellington, New Zealand

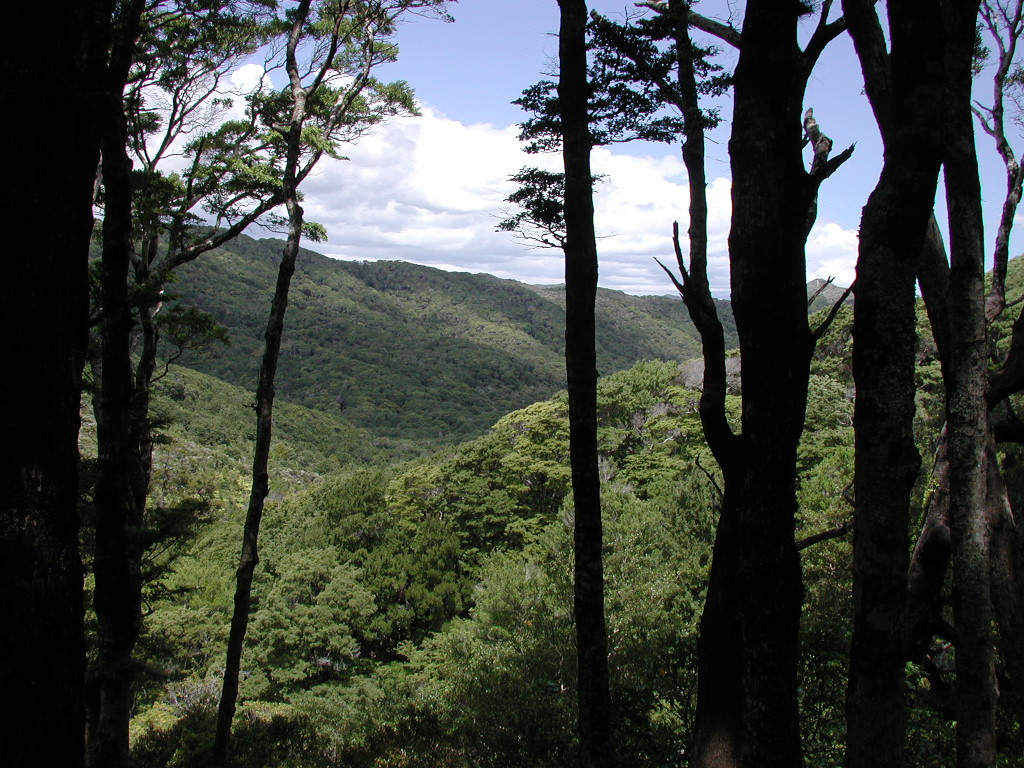
- East Harbour Regional Park, looking south into Butterfly Creek valley
- Interactive map of East Harbour Regional Park
- Type: Regional park
- Location: Eastbourne, Lower Hutt, Wellington Region, New Zealand
- Coordinates: 41.29°S 174.91°E
- Operator: Wellington Regional Council
- Status: Open

East Harbour Regional Park is a regional park stretching from Baring Head along the east side of the Wellington Harbour along the east side of Eastbourne. It is located in Lower Hutt City, in the Wellington Region of New Zealand's North Island.

The park is operated by Wellington Regional Council.

== Geography ==
The park covers the bush-clad hills between Eastbourne and Wainuiomata, from near sea level to up to 373 metres (1,224 ft) (Lowry). Several tracks, some along ridges and one into the valley of Butterfly Creek, connect the entrances on the Wellington Harbour side and the entrances on the Wainuiomata side.

The southern portion of the park includes Lake Kohangatera and Lake Kohangapiripiri.

== History ==
Local Māori occupied the area before European settlement, with a network of routes connecting settlements along the eastern harbour coast.

Te Atiawa were continuing to visit the area for seasonal fishing and berry-picking when the New Zealand Company began organised European settlement in the region in 1839, and were continuing to occupy the area late into the 19th century.

Days Bay became popular for picnics and walking from the 1890s. Tracks were built in the area under a Great Depression work scheme, making the Butterfly Creek picnic area more popular from the 1930s.

There were several shipwrecks along the coast, even after the Pencarrow Lighthouse was built in 1906 and Baring Head Lighthouse was built in 1925.

The area became the base for a proposed regional park in 1973.

Volunteers began planting native trees in the park in 2018, and had planted almost 7000 trees by 2021. The plantings include trees along the coast, and toitoi, flax, and ngaio along the Wainuiomata River bank.

Greater Wellington Regional Council consulted on the future of the park in 2020, opting reduce stock grazing and increase native bush and wetlands.

As of 2021, there were plans to establish overnight accommodation near the Baring Head Lighthouse.

In 2025, Greater Wellington Regional Council purchased Gollan’s Valley Station, a farm which had formerly separated the park in two. The land purchased includes 1,000 ha (2,500 acres) of native bush and important wetlands that will be added to the regional park.

== Recreation ==
The park is used for mountain biking, cycling, walking, running and tramping. There is a 6 kilometre return walk from the coastal carpark to Baring Head Lighthouse.

Dogs are permitted on a leash during summer months, but are not permitted lower lighthouse, the Parangarahu Lakes Area or at Baring Head/Orua-pouanui at any time. There is a ban on dogs during the August to October lambing season.

Fireworks are prohibited.
