= Pencarrow Head =

Rural area of Lower Hutt, New Zealand

Pencarrow Head Pencarrow
- Rural area
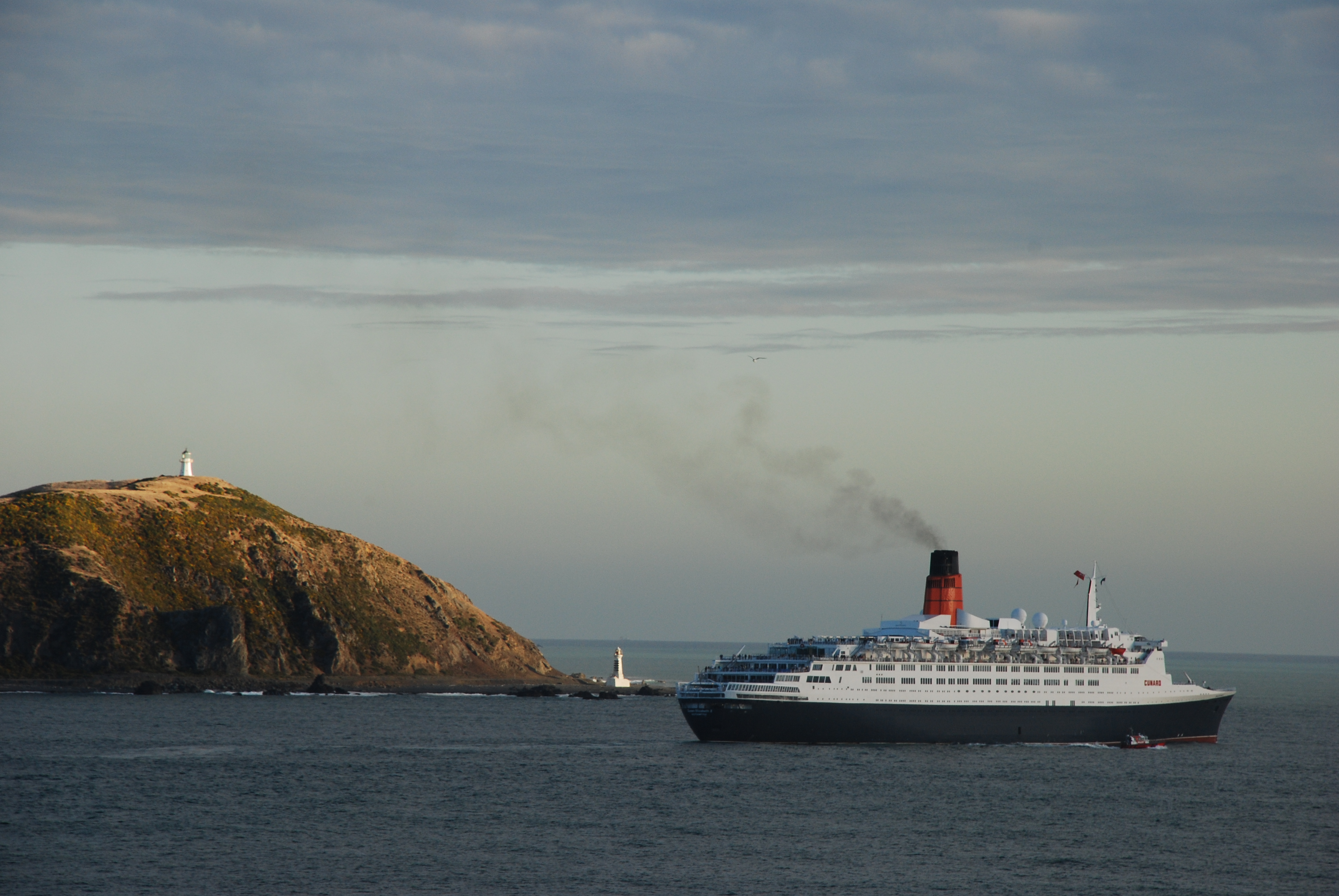
- Ocean liner Queen Elizabeth 2 at Pencarrow Head
- Interactive map of Pencarrow Head
- Coordinates: 41.3594°S 174.8482°E
- Country: New Zealand
- Region: Wellington Region
- Territorial authority: Lower Hutt
- Ward: Wainuiomata
- Electorates: Hutt South; Te Tai Tonga (Māori)

Government
  - Territorial Authority: Hutt City Council
  - Regional council: Greater Wellington Regional Council
  - Mayor of Lower Hutt: Ken Laban
  - Hutt South MP: Chris Bishop
  - Te Tai Tonga MP: Tākuta Ferris

Area
  - Total: 268.40 km^{2} (103.63 sq mi)

Population (June 2025)
  - Total: 700
  - Density: 2.6/km^{2} (6.8/sq mi)
- Time zone: UTC+12 (NZST)
  - Summer (DST): UTC+13 (NZDT)
- Postcode(s): 5013
- Area code: 04

Pencarrow Head, also known as Pencarrow, is a headland in the Wellington Region of New Zealand and the name of the surrounding area, which was derived from Pencarrow, the family home of New Zealand Company director, Sir William Molesworth. The name is Cornish and formed from Pen which translates to English as head and Carrow which is a valley.

It is the eastern headland that marks the entrance to Wellington Harbour. The area is located south of Eastbourne and is part of Lower Hutt. The area is hilly and has no road access; a walking and mountain biking track follows the coast line. The head marks the northern end of Fitzroy Bay.

The main attraction of Pencarrow Head is the Pencarrow Head Lighthouse, the first permanent lighthouse in New Zealand constructed in 1859. It is one of Wellington's most notable heritage locations and New Zealand's only female lighthouse keeper, Mary Bennett, worked here. The return walk from Eastbourne takes four hours.

The Pencarrow lakes, Lake Kohangapiripiri and Lake Kohangatera, are freshwater wetlands that were blocked from the sea by earthquake activity. Stock grazing was discontinued in 2004 and the wetlands are recovering from stock and farming impacts. The area is under joint management by the Department of Conservation and the Greater Wellington Regional Council.

Treated effluent from Seaview sewage works is discharged at Pencarrow Head, at the end of a 18 km (11 mi) pipeline built in 1962.

Many ships have been wrecked on the rocks between the Head and Point Hinds to the north, including Henrietta in 1852, Hunter in 1876, Carlotta in 1878, Magic in 1921, Admiral in 1960 and Maria Luisa in 1996, in a collision with Sydney Express.

== Demographics ==
Pencarrow statistical area covers 268.40 km^{2} (103.63 sq mi). It had an estimated population of 700 as of June 2025, with a population density of 2.6 people per km^{2}.

Historical population
Year	Pop.	±% p.a.
2006	573	—
2013	588	+0.37%
2018	651	+2.06%
2023	687	+1.08%

Pencarrow had a population of 687 in the 2023 New Zealand census, an increase of 36 people (5.5%) since the 2018 census, and an increase of 99 people (16.8%) since the 2013 census. There were 345 males, 342 females, and 3 people of other genders in 252 dwellings. 2.6% of people identified as LGBTIQ+. The median age was 45.5 years (compared with 38.1 years nationally). There were 111 people (16.2%) aged under 15 years, 117 (17.0%) aged 15 to 29, 345 (50.2%) aged 30 to 64, and 117 (17.0%) aged 65 or older.

People could identify as more than one ethnicity. The results were 86.9% European (Pākehā); 16.6% Māori; 3.5% Pasifika; 6.6% Asian; 0.9% Middle Eastern, Latin American and African New Zealanders (MELAA); and 4.4% other, which includes people giving their ethnicity as "New Zealander". English was spoken by 98.3%, Māori by 3.9%, Samoan by 0.4%, and other languages by 6.6%. No language could be spoken by 0.9% (e.g. too young to talk). The percentage of people born overseas was 16.6, compared with 28.8% nationally.

Religious affiliations were 25.3% Christian, 1.3% Hindu, 1.3% Māori religious beliefs, 1.7% Buddhist, 0.4% New Age, and 0.4% other religions. People who answered that they had no religion were 62.4%, and 8.3% of people did not answer the census question.

Of those at least 15 years old, 105 (18.2%) people had a bachelor's or higher degree, 342 (59.4%) had a post-high school certificate or diploma, and 132 (22.9%) people exclusively held high school qualifications. The median income was $46,200, compared with $41,500 nationally. 84 people (14.6%) earned over $100,000 compared to 12.1% nationally. The employment status of those at least 15 was 315 (54.7%) full-time, 84 (14.6%) part-time, and 9 (1.6%) unemployed.
