= Lake Kohangapiripiri =

Lake in New Zealand

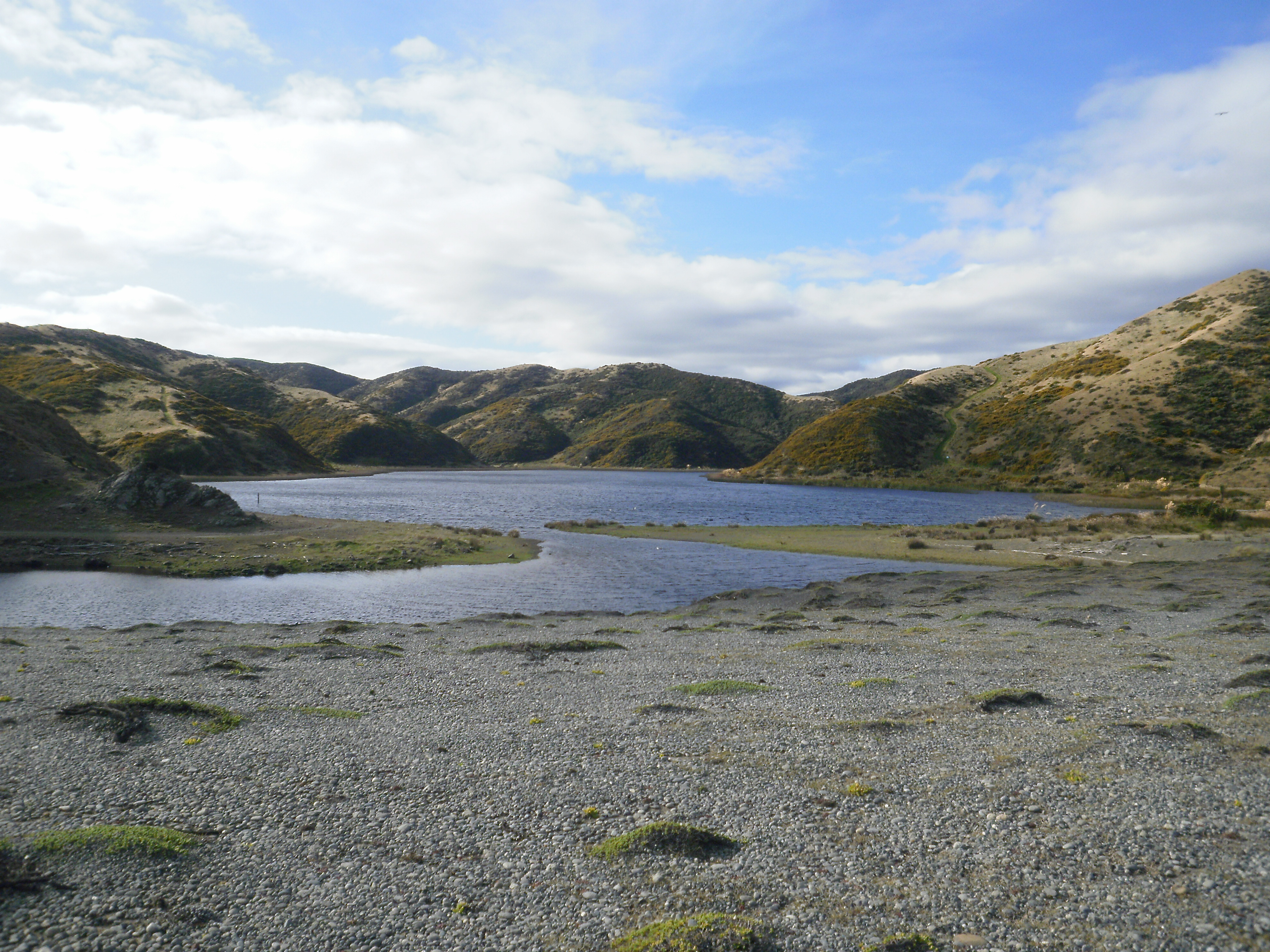
- Lake Kohangapiripiri

- Location within New Zealand Wellington
- Interactive map of Lake Kohangapiripiri
- Location: Wellington Harbour, North Island
- Coordinates: 41.3610°S 174.8569°E
- Primary inflows: Cameron Stream
- Basin countries: New Zealand

Lake Kohangapiripiri is one of the two freshwater Pencarrow lakes in Fitzroy Bay – the other being the slightly larger Lake Kohangatera. It stands to the east of Pencarrow Head, on the eastern side of New Zealand's Wellington Harbour, in East Harbour Regional Park, and is fed by Cameron Stream which rises on private land to its north. The Pencarrow lakes formed in valleys which became blocked to the nearby sea after earthquakes changed the topography.

== Unspoiled wetlands ==
Despite their proximity to Wellington, Kohangapiripiri, ('a nest clinging very strongly') and Kohangatera ('a nest basking in the sun') are notable as New Zealand's last remaining relatively unspoiled wetlands. The site supports locally rare native plants, fish and wetland birds including the spotless crake and the Australian bittern. It is the only place in the area where banded dotterel nest on the open sand. The lake itself is still free of introduced brown trout and noxious water weed and supports kokopu (Galaxias argenteus) and longfinned eel (Anguilla dieffenbachii).

The native flora on the surrounding hills had been severely denuded by 150 years of settler burning and grazing but, under joint management by the New Zealand Department of Conservation and the Greater Wellington Regional Council, stock animals have been banned since 2004 and the natural vegetation has begun to recover.

The area around the lake has yielded evidence of early Maori occupation and was the site of the New Zealand's first lighthouse.
