= Baring Head =

Headland on North Island, New Zealand

Baring Head Ōrua-pouanui (Māori)
- Headland
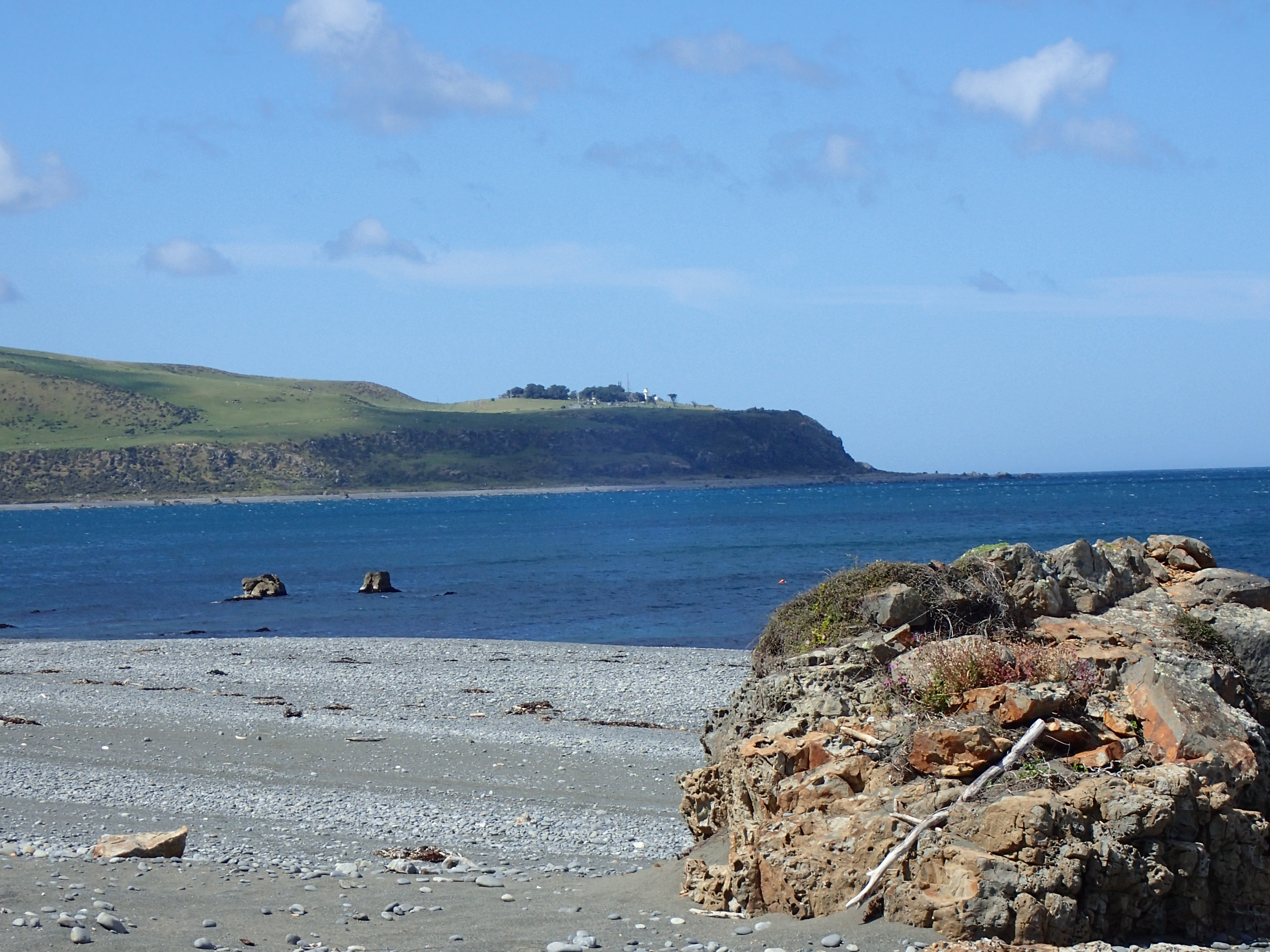
- Baring Head / Ōrua-pouanui from the North

- Location within New Zealand Wellington
- Coordinates: 41.416667°S 174.866667°E
- Location: Wellington Region, New Zealand
- Part of: North Island
- Water bodies: Cook Strait

Baring Head (Māori: Ōrua-pouanui, officially gazetted as Baring Head / Ōrua-pouanui) is a headland, located between Wellington Harbour and Palliser Bay at the southern end of the North Island of New Zealand. It marks the southern end of Fitzroy Bay.

The Baring Head Lighthouse, built in 1935, was the first light in New Zealand to start operating immediately on electricity.

The Baring Head Atmospheric Research Station, administered by National Institute of Water and Atmospheric Research, provides the longest continuous record of atmospheric carbon dioxide in the Southern Hemisphere.

The headland is administered by Wellington Regional Council as part of East Harbour Regional Park.

== Geography ==
The reserve includes the lower reaches and mouth of Wainuiomata River and the coastal encampment around Baring Head. The rugged hills are visible from parts of Wellington City.

Baring Head is one of the Wellington Region's “coastal habitats of significance for indigenous birds”. There are at least nine at-risk bird species: the black shag, Caspian tern, New Zealand pipit, pied shag, pied stilt, red-billed gull, variable oystercatcher, white-fronted tern and the banded dotterel. The banded dotterel has a breeding site at Baring Head.

Within the beach and coastal encampment there are also many lizard species, rare spider, moth and cicada species. and cushion plants, spinifex and sand tussock. The river has species of dwarf inanga and other fish, and tororaro (Muehlenbeckia astonii) grows nearby.

== History ==
Baring Head was once an important place for traditional food gathering by local Māori.

The Baring Head Lighthouse was constructed in 1935. Its launch marked the start of electrification of light houses in New Zealand. It was initially supplied by diesel generators before being connected to mains electricity in 1950.

Several lookout posts were established on the headland during World War II. The lighthouse was fully automated in 1989.

In the 1990s, Energy Direct (formerly the Hutt Valley Electric Power Board) applied for resource consents to build a what would have been the first wind farm in New Zealand. The Wellington Regional Council rejected the application and the applicant did not appeal. The site at that time was in private ownership.

In June 2010, a consortium including Wellington Regional Council purchased a 284.6-hectare (703-acre) property near the Baring Head lighthouse for addition to the East Harbour Regional Park. The purchase was made with financial contributions from the New Zealand Government's Nature Heritage Fund, the Department of Conservation, Hutt City Council and a private benefactor. The purchase will protect a wide range of landscape, scientific, historical, ecological, cultural and recreational values. The area was opened to the general public on 13 February 2011.

Since 2011, the Friends of Baring Head has worked alongside the regional and city councils, Taranaki Whānui ki te Upoko o te Ika, Birds New Zealand, and other groups in a range of activities, including pest control, rāhui, signage and fencing, and community education. It has also worked with the regional council to redevelop and enhance the lighthouse cottages and garden.

== Science research ==
Baring Head Atmospheric carbon dioxide

New Zealand atmospheric methane concentrations at Baring Head

The Baring Head Atmospheric Research Station was established on the headland in 1972, under the leadership of Dave Lowe. It has been operating ever since, with extensive research being published based on its records. The Carbon Dioxide Information Analysis Center in the United States has a record of measurements from 1970 to 1993, and from 1977 to December 2007.

== Recreation ==
The park can be accessed by foot during most of the year from the mouth of the Wainuiomata River, but people are advised not to cross the river when it's discoloured or in flood.

Dogs, fires, fireworks, and trail and quad bikes are not permitted at any time. Recreational vehicles are not permitted beyond the carparks. Visitors must take rubbish, and must not remove plants, animals or rocks.

There is a marked walking and cycling route from the main entrance, passing the Old Pump Shed, the Baring Head Lighthouse, and the Para Trig and World War II Bunkers. A return walk to the Para Trig takes about three hours. Horse riding is permitted on the track by permit only.

Along the route is a set of natural rock formations, used by bouldering. Rock climbing website ClimbNZ describes the rea as "the birthplace of bouldering in New Zealand" and list over 200 climbing routes on the rocks.

Visitors are advised to carry warm and waterproof clothing, sufficient food and drink, wear strong lace-up footwear, inform others of their plans, and watch out for vehicles along parts of the track.

== See also ==
- Geography of New Zealand
