= List of shipwrecks in April 1876 =

The list of shipwrecks in April 1876 includes ships sunk, foundered, grounded, or otherwise lost during April 1876.

== 1 April ==
List of shipwrecks: 1 April 1876
Ship	State	Description
Odin	Germany	The ship was wrecked south of Cartagena, Spain. Her crew were rescued She was on a voyage from Torrevieja, Spain to Rostock.
Oxford	United Kingdom	The ship ran aground in the Haff, off Königsberg.
Symmetry	United Kingdom	The ship departed from Sombrero, Anguilla for a British port. No further trace, presumed foundered with the loss of all hands.
Sverre	Denmark	The ship ran aground on Struttskrakken.

== 2 April ==
List of shipwrecks: 2 April 1876
Ship	State	Description
Agrigento	Italy	The steamship collided with the steamship Hylton Castle (United Kingdom) off Cape Maleas, Greece and sank with the loss of 29 of the 64 people on board. Survivors were rescued by Hylton Castle.
James Paxton	New Zealand	The 60-ton schooner went aground close to Taiaroa Head at the mouth of Otago Harbour while en route from Dunedin to Riverton and became a wreck.

== 3 April ==
List of shipwrecks: 3 April 1876
Ship	State	Description
Dragoon	United Kingdom	The ship ran aground on the Satonsea Rocks, off the coast of Northumberland. She was on a voyage from Hamburg, Germany to the River Tyne. She was refloated and resumed her voyage.
Kathleen	United Kingdom	The ship departed from Poole, Dorset for Goole, Yorkshire. No further trace, presumed foundered with the loss of all hands.
Queen Margaret	United Kingdom	The steamship was driven ashore in the Hooghly River. She was refloated.

== 4 April ==
List of shipwrecks: 4 April 1876
Ship	State	Description
Ceres	Norway	The schooner ran aground on the Cabadello Rock, off Porto, Portugal. Her crew were rescued. She was on a voyage from Porto to Rio de Janeiro, Brazil.
Fritz Schmidt	United States	The ship was towed in to Brunswick, Georgia in a sinking condition. She was on a voyage from Savannah, Georgia to Riga, Russia.
Gladstone	Netherlands	The barque was driven ashore on The Burroo, off the Calf of Man, Isle of Man with the loss of three of her nine crew. Survivors were rescued by Port Erin fishermen. She was on a voyage from Liverpool, Lancashire, United Kingdom to Danzig, and/or Memel, Germany. Gladstone was refloated with the assistance of a tug on 22 April and was towed in to Port Erin. She was deemed a constructive total loss.
Hannah Douglas	United Kingdom	The brig was wrecked 2 nautical miles (3.7 km) south of the South Stack, Anglesey. Her six crew were rescued. She was on a voyage from Seville, Spain to Liverpool.
Helen J. Holway	United States	The schooner stranded in a snowstorm near Life Saving Station No. 21, on Long Island or Fire Island, New York with the loss of six of her seven crew. She was on a voyage from Cienfuegos, Cuba to New York City.
Idabella	United States	The schooner was beached in a snowstorm near Cape Cod, Massachusetts with the loss of a crew member. Also reported as being abandoned at sea, with her five crew rescued by the barque Kellus (Norway). Idabella was on a voyage from Newcastle, Delaware to Halifax, Nova Scotia, Canada.
John Boyle	United Kingdom	The steamship was run into by the steamship Emma Lawson and sank in the English Channel 50 nautical miles (93 km) south west of Start Point, Devon. Her twenty crew were rescued by Emma Lawson. John Boyle was on a voyage from South Shields, County Durham to Gibraltar.
Maria Angela	Italy	The full-rigged ship was driven ashore at Aigues-Mortes, Gard, France. Her crew were rescued. She was on a voyage from Palermo, Sicily to Cette, Hérault, France.
Maria Wheeler	United States	The ship was wrecked on Rum Cay.
Ralph M. Hayward	United States	The schooner collided with the steamship Revira (Spain) and sank 35 nautical miles (65 km) south west of the South Stack. Her crew were rescued by Revira. Ralph M. Hayward was on a voyage from Liverpool to Havana, Cuba.
Tunstall, and Usworth	United Kingdom	The steamships collided in the Elbe and were both severely damaged.

== 5 April ==
List of shipwrecks: 5 April 1876
Ship	State	Description
Andean	United Kingdom	The steamship caught fire at Liverpool, Lancashire. The fire was extinguished.
Blair Athole	United Kingdom	The steamship ran aground in the River Foyle. She was on a voyage from Burry Port, Glamorgan to Londonderry.
Ceres	France	The schooner was wrecked near Smögen, Sweden. Her crew were rescued. She was on a voyage from Nantes, Loire-Inférieure to Christiania, Norway.
H. L. Routh, and R. Webster	United States	The barques collided at Portland, Maine. Both vessels were severely damaged.
Iona	United Kingdom	The ship was driven ashore on Anholt, Denmark. She was on a voyage from Wick, Caithness to Königsberg, Germany. She was refloated and taken in to Fredrikshavn, Denmark.
J. M. Lennard	United Kingdom	The steamship ran aground near Maassluis, South Holland, Netherlands. She was on a voyage from Middlesbrough, Yorkshire to Rotterdam, South Holland. She was refloated with the assistance of a number of tugs.
Laura	United Kingdom	The brig was driven ashore and wrecked at Hornbæk. She was on a voyage from South Shields, County Durham, United Kingdom to Stettin, Germany.
Unnamed	United Kingdom	River Dee ferryboat disaster: A ferryboat capsized in the River Dee, Aberdeenshire with the loss of 32 of the 76 people on board.

== 6 April ==
List of shipwrecks: 6 April 1876
Ship	State	Description
Eleonore	Norway	The brig was driven ashore and wrecked at Nidingen, Sweden. Her crew were rescued. She was on a voyage from Grangemouth, Stirlingshire, United Kingdom to Bolderāja, Russia.
Glengarnock	United Kingdom	The steamship was driven ashore at Brennan Head, Isle of Arran. She was refloated on 8 April.
Greina	United Kingdom	The ship was wrecked in a hurricane at Petit-Trou, Trinidad. She was on a voyage from Saint Domingo to Falmouth, Cornwall.
Harlingen	United Kingdom	The schooner was driven ashore on Skagen, Denmark. Her crew were rescued. She was on a voyage from Sunderland, County Durham to Wismar, Germany. She subsequently became a wreck.
Indus	United Kingdom	The steamship ran aground on the Monsecar Reef, off Malta. She was on a voyage from Suez, Egypt to Malta. She was refloated and taken in to Malta.
Irene	Norway	The brig was driven ashore on Skagen. She was on a voyage from Charlestown, Cornwall, United Kingdom to Copenhagen, Denmark.
Humboldt	United States	The ship sank at Pascagoula, Mississippi.
Lochnagar	United Kingdom	The schooner was driven ashore on Læsø, Denmark. She was on a voyage from Charlestown, Cornwall to Danzig, Germany. She was refloated and resumed her voyage.
Mont Blanc	United Kingdom	The schooner was driven ashore on Skagen. She was on a voyage from Glasgow, Renfrewshire to Stettin, Germany.

== 7 April ==
List of shipwrecks: 7 April 1876
Ship	State	Description
August	Germany	The barque was driven ashore at Gilleleje, Denmark. She was on a voyage from Glasgow, Renfrewshire, United Kingdom to Stettin. She was refloated and towed in to Helsingør, Denmark in a severely leaky condition.
Baldoran	United Kingdom	The ship departed from Bluff Harbour, New Zealand for Valparaíso, Chile. No further trace, presumed foundered with the loss of all hands, about twenty lives.
Cambridgeshire	United Kingdom	The ship was damaged by an onboard explosion at South Shields, County Durham. Two of her crew were severely wounded.
Harvest Queen	United Kingdom	The steamship ran aground on the Carr Rock. She was on a voyage from Sunderland, County Durham to Dundee, Forfarshire. She was refloated and completed her voyage in a leaky condition.
Major Nanney	United Kingdom	The smack was driven ashore and wrecked at St. Gowan 's Head, Pembrokeshire.
Richard Moxon	United Kingdom	The ship was driven ashore at Saltfleet, Lincolnshire. She was on a voyage from Ghent, East Flanders, Belgium to Goole, Yorkshire.
Savernake	United Kingdom	The steamer was damaged in a collision with Vesuvius (Netherlands) 7 nautical miles (13 km) south west of Hastings, Sussex. She rescued all 32 people from Vesuvius and then was beached at Hastings to prevent sinking. Savernake was on a voyage from Sunderland, County Durham to Plymouth, Devon. She was refloated, repaired and returned to service.
Vesuvius	Netherlands	The steamer was sunk in a collision with Savernake (United Kingdom) 7 nautical miles (13 km) south west of Hastings. All 32 people on board were rescued by Savernake and a tug. Vesuvius was on a voyage from Odesa, Russia to Rotterdam, South Holland.
Unnamed	Portugal	A fishing boat was run down by the steamship Aberdeen (United Kingdom) off the coast of Portugal. Her crew were rescued by Aberdeen.

== 8 April ==
List of shipwrecks: 8 April 1876
Ship	State	Description
Bel Emilio	Italy	The ship san near "Ragosaizda". Her crew were rescued. She was on a voyage from Trieste to "Tran".
Henrietta Greenleaf	United States	The fishing schooner capsized and sank on passage to the Grand Banks of Newfoundland with the loss of four of her fifteen crew. Survivors abandoned ship in two dories. The Captain and four crewmen in one dory was saved after another crewman died. Five crew were reported missing.
Hunter	New Zealand	The 22-ton schooner ran aground on Barrett's Reef at the entrance to Wellington Harbour during a gale and became a complete loss. All hands were saved.
Mary	United Kingdom	The wherry was run down and sunk by the steamship Llewellyn (United Kingdom) off Maryport, Cumberland. Her crew were rescued. Mary was on a voyage from Liverpool, Lancashire to Dumfries.

== 9 April ==
List of shipwrecks: 9 April 1876
Ship	State	Description
Allerston	United Kingdom	The ship was driven ashore 10 nautical miles (19 km) from Domesnes, Russia and was wrecked. Her crew were rescued.
Sabina	United Kingdom	The ship was sighted off Deal, Kent whilst on a voyage from Fowey, Cornwall for Newcastle upon Tyne, Northumberland. No further trace, presumed foundered with the loss of all hands. A boat marked Sabrina was sighted in a waterlogged condition off Spurn Point, Yorkshire on 17 April. The ship supposed to have foundered with the loss of all hands.
Webfoot	United Kingdom	The ship was driven ashore in the Nieuw Diep. She was on a voyage from Java, Netherlands East Indies to Amsterdam, South Holland, Netherlands.

== 10 April ==
List of shipwrecks: 10 April 1876
Ship	State	Description
Bella Keith	United Kingdom	The ship was driven ashore on Hog Island, off Kilrush, County Clare. She was on a voyage from Baltimore, Maryland, United States to Kilrush.
Eliezer	Germany	The ship was driven ashore at Dragør, Denmark. She was on a voyage from Danzig to Caernarfon, United Kingdom. She was refloated and resumed her voyage.
Gurtubay	Spain	The ship ran aground. She was on a voyage from Cárdenas, Cuba to Greenock, Renfrewshire, United Kingdom. She was refloated and taken in to Greenock for repairs.
John and Alice	United Kingdom	The brigantine ran aground on the Haisborough Sands, in the North Sea off the coast of Norfolk. Her crew were rescued by the fishing smack Daniel (United Kingdom). John and Alice was on a voyage from the River Tyne to Rotterdam, South Holland, Netherlands.
Liberator	United States	The ship was wrecked on Great Loo Choo. Her crew were rescued. She was on a voyage from Manila, Spanish East Indies to San Francisco, California
Lodewyk	Netherlands	The ship was driven ashore and wrecked at Hoek van Holland, South Holland with the loss of a crew member. She was on a voyage from Africa to Rotterdam
Margaret Davison	United Kingdom	The ship was driven ashore at "Trindelm", Denmark. Her crew were rescued. She was on a voyage from Sunderland, County Durham to Lübeck, Germany. She floated off and came ashore on Læsø.
St. Rollox	United Kingdom	The ship departed from Greenock, Renfrewshire for Belfast, County Antrim. No further trace, presumed foundered with the loss of all hands.

== 11 April ==
List of shipwrecks: 11 April 1876
Ship	State	Description
Blanche	United Kingdom	The steamship ran aground in the Carlingford Lough. She was on a voyage from Port Talbot, Glamorgan to Newry, County Antrim. She was refloated and completed her voyage.
Claudine	United Kingdom	The schooner ran aground at Sligo. She was on a voyage from Sligo to Liverpool, Lancashire.
Elizabeth	United Kingdom	The ship was abandoned off Buckie, Banffshire. Her five crew were rescued by the Buckie Lifeboat.
Frederica Wilhelmina	Germany	The brig was driven ashore and wrecked at Helsingborg, Sweden. She was on a voyage from Danzig to Aberdeen, United Kingdom.
Helen	New South Wales	The 165-ton brigantine was wrecked near East Cape, New Zealand while en route from Newcastle, New South Wales, to Napier, New Zealand with a cargo of coal. There were no deaths.
Mester	United Kingdom	The sloop was wrecked on the Krantz Sand, in the North Sea with the loss of a crew member. She was on a voyage from Gloucester, United Kingdom to Hamburg, Germany.
Nancy's Pride	United Kingdom	The sailing boat capsized 2 nautical miles (3.7 km) off Eastbourne, Sussex with the loss of thirteen of the fifteen people on board.
Ondine	France	The barque was abandoned in the English Channel between Start Point, Devon and Portland, Dorset, United Kingdom. She came ashore in Lyme Bay. Ondine was subsequently towed in to Exmouth, Devon in a severely leaky condition. She was on a voyage from London to Marseille, Bouches-du-Rhône.
Patrioten	Denmark	The ship was wrecked off Fanø with the loss of all hands. She was on a voyage from Charlestown, Cornwall, United Kingdom to Esbjerg.
Romp	United Kingdom	The schooner was wrecked at Lossiemouth, Moray. Her crew were rescued by the Coastguard. She was on a voyage from Nairn to Paisley, Renfrewshire.
Tobina	Netherlands	The schooner ran aground and sank on the Roar Bank, in the English Channel off Littlestone-on-Sea, Kent, United Kingdom with the loss of two of her seven crew. Survivors were rescued by the New Romney Lifeboat. She was on a voyage from Sunderland, County Durham, United Kingdom to Bahia, Brazil.
Utility	United Kingdom	The schooner ran aground on the Horse Bank, in the Irish Sea off the coast of Lancashire and was wrecked with the loss of a crew member. Survivors were rescued by the Lytham Lifeboat.
Wyre	United Kingdom	The schooner was wrecked on the Horse Bank. Both crew were rescued by the Lytham Lifeboat.
Unnamed	Netherlands	A brigantine capsized off Dungeness, Kent with the loss of two of her seven crew. Survivors were rescued by the Dungeness lifeboat.

== 12 April ==
List of shipwrecks: 12 April 1876
Ship	State	Description
Alf	Norway	The barque was driven ashore 3 nautical miles (5.6 km) north of Liepāja, Russia. Her crew were rescued. She was on a voyage from Liverpool, Lancashire to Liepāja.
Carl Wilhelm	Sweden	The brig was driven ashore and wrecked near Falkenberg. She was on a voyage from Falkenburg to an English port.
Duncan	United Kingdom	The steamship was driven ashore and wrecked at a Baltic port. She was on a voyage from Dundee, Forfarshire to Reval, Russia.
Elizabeth	Sweden	The schooner was driven ashore and wrecked near Falkenburg. She was on a voyage from Falkenburg to an English port.
Eugenie	Sweden	The brig was driven ashore and wrecked near Falkenburg. She was on a voyage from Falkenburg to an English port.
Frères et Sœurs	France	The brigantine foundered in the Atlantic Ocean (47°29′N 40°30′W). Her crew were rescued by Bonte (France).
Johanne	Germany	The ship ran aground in Aalbak Bay. She was on a voyage from Memel to an English port. She was refloated and taken in to Fredrikshavn, Denmark.
Neptune	United States	The ship was wrecked on Cape Sable Island, Nova Scotia, Canada. Her crew were rescued. She was on a voyage from Liverpool to New York.
Olto	United Kingdom	The ship was wrecked on the Dutch coast with the loss of all hands. She was on a voyage from Hartlepool, County Durham to Riga.
Sonntag	Germany	The barque was driven ashore on Hirsholmene, Denmark. She was on a voyage from Stettin to Gloucester, United Kingdom. She was refloated and taken in to Copenhagen, Denmark.
Vaaren	Denmark	The schooner was driven ashore and wrecked near Falkenburg. She was on a voyage from Falkenburg to an English port.
William Dobson	Canada	The ship was wrecked on the Bonqueron Reef. All on board survived.

== 13 April ==
List of shipwrecks: 13 April 1876
Ship	State	Description
Atlantic	United Kingdom	The barque ran aground on the Longsand, in the North Sea off the coast of Essex. She was on a voyage from Dundee, Forfarshire to Coquimbo, Chile. She was refloated with assistance and taken in to The Downs.
Egmont	New Zealand	The 52-ton steamer was holed on rocks while leaving the mouth of the Patea River and foundered.
Harlington	United Kingdom	The ship was driven ashore and wrecked on Skagen, Denmark. She was on a voyage from Sunderland, County Durham to Wismar, Germany.
Irene	United Kingdom	The ship was driven ashore and wrecked on Skagen.
Jens Jorgensen	Denmark	The schooner foundered. Her crew were rescued by the steamship Ella (United Kingdom). Jens Jorgensen was on a voyage from Fraserburgh, Aberdeenshire to Charlestown, Cornwall, United Kingdom.
Lightning	United Kingdom	The steamship ran aground in the Douro and became waterlogged.
Margaret McDonald	United Kingdom	The ship departed from Sunderland for Le Tréport, Seine-Inférieure, France. No further trace, presumed foundered with the loss of all hands.
Mount Blairy	United Kingdom	The ship was wrecked on Skagen. She was on a voyage from Glasgow, Renfrewshire to Stettin, Germany.
Ragschild	Denmark	The ship was wrecked on the Anholt Reef, in the Baltic Sea. She was on a voyage from Bo'ness, Lothian, United Kingdom to Aarhus.
Sakuntala	Norway	The schooner was driven ashore and wrecked near Husby, Denmark. Her crew were rescued. She was on a voyage from Padstow, Cornwall, United Kingdom to Christiania.
Scandinavian	Denmark	The steamship was driven ashore and wrecked at a Baltic port. She was on a voyage from Helsingør to Reval, Russia.
Tiger	Germany	The steamship was discovered derelict off Ameland, Friesland, Netherlands by the steamship Falke (Germany). She was towed in to the Nieuwe Diep.
Four unnamed vessels	Flags unknown	The ships were driven ashore near Gothenburg, Sweden.
Unnamed	Flag unknown	A schooner ran aground on the Nore. She was refloated the next day.

== 14 April ==
List of shipwrecks: 14 April 1876
Ship	State	Description
Accord	United Kingdom	The ship was driven ashore south of Grimsby, Lincolnshire.
Adupard	United Kingdom	The steamship was driven ashore near San Cataldo, Sicily, Italy. She was refloated and taken in to Brindisi.
Alabama	United Kingdom	The schooner was wrecked on the Woolpack Sands, off Burnham Overy Staithe, Norfolk with the loss of two of her four crew. Survivors were rescued by the Hunstanton Lifeboat. She was on a voyage from Cliffe, Kent to Hull, Yorkshire.
Alert	United Kingdom	The schooner was driven ashore and wrecked at Blakeney or Holkham, Norfolk. She was on a voyage from London to Gainsborough, Lincolnshire.
Amanda	United Kingdom	The ship was lost off North Somercotes, Lincolnshire.
Anna Rosseta	United Kingdom	The ship was driven ashore and wrecked at Holkham. She was on a voyage from London to Hull.
Arethusa	United Kingdom	The ketch foundered in the North Sea off Sheringham, Norfolk with the loss of all hands.
Argo	United Kingdom	The ship was driven ashore and wrecked between North Somercotes and Saltfleet, Lincolnshire. At least one crew member survived.
Brazilian, and D. C. Chapman	United Kingdom; United States	The steamship Brazilian collided with the brigantine D. C. Chapman. Both vessels were severely damaged and put in to Gibraltar. Brazilian was on a voyage from Newcastle upon Tyne, Northumberland to Genoa, Italy. D. C. Chapman was on a voyage from Gibraltar to Cádiz, Spain.
British Queen	United Kingdom	The ship was driven ashore and wrecked at Holkham. She was on a voyage from Rochester, Kent to Hull.
Cygenet	United Kingdom	The ship foundered off the north Norfolk coast. Wreckage washed up at Burnham Overy Staithe.
Cyllene	United Kingdom	The ship was driven ashore south of Grimsby.
Derby	United Kingdom	The steamship was sunk by ice at Reval, Russia. She was on a voyage from Hull to Reval.
Don Antonio	United Kingdom	The steamship was driven ashore between Chapel St. Leonards and Hogsthorpe, Lincolnshire]= with the loss of a crew member. She was on a voyage from Lisbon, Portugal to Hull.
Duchess of Kent	United Kingdom	The ship was lost off North Somercotes.
Foam	United Kingdom	The ship was driven ashore south of Grimsby.
Henrietta	Germany	The barque was driven ashore at "Grafwerna".
Henriette	United Kingdom	The ship was driven ashore on the Swedish coast. She was refloated and towed in to Helsingør, Denmark.
Ino	United Kingdom	The ship was driven ashore south of Grimsby.
Ixia	United Kingdom	The steamship ran aground at Great Yarmouth, Norfolk. She was on a voyage from Newcastle upon Tyne to the Charente. She was refloated and taken in to Great Yarmouth in a leaky condition.
John and Jane	United Kingdom	The sloop was driven ashore and wrecked at Wells-next-the-Sea, Norfolk. Her crew were rescued. She was on a voyage from London to Hull.
Konig Ernest August	Germany	The brig was driven ashore south of Grimsby. She was on a voyage from Swinemünde to Grimsby.
Laura	United Kingdom	The ship ran aground at Hornbæk, Denmark.
Leonides	United Kingdom	The ship was driven ashore south of Grimsby.
Liverpool	United Kingdom	The schooner was driven ashore and wrecked at Friskney, Lincolnshire.
Marne	Germany	The brig was driven ashore south of Grimsby.
Martin	Germany	The full-rigged ship was driven ashore and wrecked at Helsingborg. She was later refloated and taken in to Helsingør.
Mary M. Francis	United States	The brig was wrecked on the Dudgeon Sandbank, in the North Sea with the loss of four of her nine crew. Survivors were rescued by the full-rigged ship Carrie Clark (United States). Mary M. Francis was on a voyage from Portland, Maine to Leith, Lothian, United Kingdom.
Meaborn	United Kingdom	The ship was driven ashore south of Grimsby.
Miss Nightingale	United Kingdom	The brigantine foundered off Kilnsea, Yorkshire with the loss of all seven crew. She was on a voyage from Hartlepool, County Durham to Shoreham-by-Sea, Sussex.
Naomi	United Kingdom	The ship was driven ashore and wrecked at Mumby, Lincolnshire. Her crew were rescued. She was on a voyage from Norwich, Norfolk to Sunderland, County Durham.
Onward	United Kingdom	The ship was driven ashore south of Grimsby.
Robert Adamson	United Kingdom	The ship was driven ashore at Chapel St. Leonards. Her crew were rescued. She was on a voyage from London to Sunderland.
Rothbury	United Kingdom	The brig was driven onto a sandbank off Wainfleet, Lincolnshire. Her crew were rescued. She was on a voyage from Smyrna, Ottoman Empire to Hull.
Solon	United Kingdom	The ship was driven ashore and wrecked at Saltfleet. At least five crew survived.
Surprise	United Kingdom	The ship was driven ashore at Friskney.
Thorney Close	United Kingdom	The brig ran aground at Mumby. Her seven crew were rescued. She was on a voyage from Whitstable, Kent to Sunderland.
Tweed	United Kingdom	The schooner foundered in the North Sea 5 nautical miles (9.3 km) south of the Dudgeon Lightship ( Trinity House). Her crew were rescued by the smack Milton (United Kingdom). Tweed was on a voyage from Sunderland to London.
Victory	United Kingdom	The barque was wrecked on the Stoney Binks, in the North Sea off the mouth of the Humber, with the loss of all 26 people on board. She was on a voyage from the River Tyne to San Francisco, California, United States.

== 15 April ==
List of shipwrecks: 15 April 1876
Ship	State	Description
Anna Cerena	Netherlands	The fishing boat was run down and sunk in the North Sea by the brig Adrian (United Kingdom) with the loss of six of her seven crew. The survivor was rescued the pilot cutter No. 1 (Netherlands.
Clementina	United Kingdom	The schooner ran aground near Almería, Spain. She was on a voyage from Oran, Algeria to Gibraltar. She was refloated with the assistance of a Spanish revenue cruiser and taken in to Málaga by the cruiser. One of Clementina's crew was shot and killed by the Spanish when slow to carry out an order to go below. The vessel was seized by the Spanish. A minor diplomatic incident was caused when the British Consul was refused access to the British sailors at a trial.
Charitas	France	The barque was abandoned off Adra, Spain. She foundered off Málaga, Spain with the loss of six crew of the steamship Maria Louise (United Kingdom), which had taken her in tow. Charitas was on a voyage from Marseille, Bouches-du-Rhône to Falmouth, Cornwall, United Kingdom.
Dunsany	United Kingdom	The steamship heeled over and sank 8 nautical miles (15 km) off the mouth of the Humber with the loss of four of her twelve crew. She was on a voyage from the River Tyne to London.
Elizabeth	United Kingdom	The ship was wrecked on Schiermonnikoog, Friesland, Netherlands. Her crew were rescued. She was on a voyage from Newcastle upon Tyne, Northumberland to Leer, Germany.
Eliza Caroline	United Kingdom	The brig sprang a leak and was abandoned in the North Sea. Her crew were rescued. She was on a voyage from Sunderland, County Durham to Danzig, Germany.
Nuphar	United Kingdom	The steamship ran aground on the Sheringham Shoal, in the North Sea of the coast of Norfolk. She was on a voyage from South Shields, County Durham to Genoa, Italy. She was refloated and taken in to The Downs in a leaky condition.
Perseus	United Kingdom	The ship was driven ashore at Grimsby, Lincolnshire.
Tamaulipas	United Kingdom	The steamship sprang a leak and was beached at Kingstown, County Dublin, where she sank. She was on a voyage from Glasgow, Renfrewshire to Dublin.
Victory	United Kingdom	The ship was wrecked at the mouth of the Humber with the loss of all 25 crew. She was on a voyage from the River Tyne to San Francisco, California, United States.
Unnamed	Imperial Russian Navy	A corvette foundered off Piraeus, Greece.

== 16 April ==
List of shipwrecks: 16 April 1876
Ship	State	Description
Kate and Elizabeth	United Kingdom	The schooner was driven ashore at Blakeney, Norfolk.
Kwang Tung	United Kingdom	The passenger-cargo steamship went ashore on Ockseu Island, China, in the Taiwan Straits, in thick fog. Her passengers and crew were rescued and she later became a wreck. She was on a voyage from Hong Kong to Foochow.
Mary	United Kingdom	The barque was driven ashore at Holyhead, Anglesey. She was refloated with the assistance of the tug United States (United Kingdom) and towed in to the River Mersey.
Monaco	United Kingdom	The steamship ran aground at Korsør, Denmark. She was on a voyage from Norrköping, Sweden to Korsør.
Peru	United Kingdom	The barque was driven ashore and wrecked at Runton, Norfolk. Her crew were rescued. She was on a voyage from London to the River Tyne.
Unnamed	Flag unknown	A ship sank in the Hilbre Islands, Cheshire, United Kingdom with the loss of all hands.

== 17 April ==
List of shipwrecks: 17 April 1876
Ship	State	Description
Dictator	United States	The steamboat collided with a railway bridge and sank in the Mississippi River at Hannibal, Missouri with the loss of nine lives.
Mary Godell	United States	The full-rigged ship collided with the schooner Elizabeth (United Kingdom) and was beached at Falmouth, Cornwall, United Kingdom.
Milo	United Kingdom	The tug caught fire at Cardiff, Glamorgan and was scuttled.

== 18 April ==
List of shipwrecks: 18 April 1876
Ship	State	Description
Agnes and Mary	United Kingdom	The sloop foundered off Inchcolm, Fife with the loss of all hands.
Humboldt	Germany	The ship was driven ashore at Winterton-on-Sea, Norfolk, United Kingdom. She was on a voyage from Hamburg to Dona Francisca, Brazil. She was refloated and towed in to Great Yarmouth, Norfolk.
Illinois	United States	The 409-ton whaler, a barque, sank in the Bering Sea south of the Bering Strait 15 minutes after colliding with the vessel Marengo (United States).
Minerva	Sweden	The steamship ran aground at Sunderland, County Durham, United Kingdom. She was on a voyage from Gothenburg to Sunderland. She was refloated.
Sperne	Austria-Hungary	The ship ran aground on the Brake Sand. She was on a voyage from South Shields, County Durham to Trieste. She was refloated and taken in to The Downs.
Water Lily	United Kingdom	The ship ran aground on the Showder. She was on a voyage from Blackpool to Southport, Lancashire. She was refloated the next day and completed her voyage.
Wear	United Kingdom	The brig ran aground on the Shipwash Sand, in the North Sea off the coast of Suffolk and was abandoned by her crew.

== 19 April ==
List of shipwrecks: 19 April 1876
Ship	State	Description
Persian	United Kingdom	The steamship ran aground at Isola, Malta. She was refloated and resumed her voyage.
Tunstall	United Kingdom	The steamship ran aground and was damaged at Sunderland, County Durham.

== 21 April ==
List of shipwrecks: 21 April 1876
Ship	State	Description
Hoppit	United Kingdom	The ship collided with the steamship Corine (United Kingdom) and sank in the River Avon.
Judith	United Kingdom	The ship was driven ashore and wrecked at Fraserburgh, Aberdeenshire. She was on a voyage from Sunderland, County Durham to Fraserburgh.
Stadt	Norway	The steamship ran aground near Skudesneshavn. She was refloated and taken in to Bergen.

== 22 April ==
List of shipwrecks: 22 April 1876
Ship	State	Description
Cameronian	United Kingdom	The ship struck a sunken wreck and was beached on North Swin Island, in the Belfast Lough. She was on a voyage from Liverpool, Lancashire to Belfast, County Antrim.
Dunraven	United Kingdom	The steamship ran aground on the Shaab Mahmoud Reef, in the Red Sea and was wrecked. Her crew were rescued. She was on a voyage from Aden, Aden Colony to Liverpool.
Elizabeth	United Kingdom	The steamship was run into by T. N. Foster (United Kingdom) and sank in the River Thames near Gravesend, Kent.
Rob Roy	United Kingdom	The steamship ran aground on Saltholmen, Denmark.

== 23 April ==
List of shipwrecks: 23 April 1876
Ship	State	Description
Alonzo	United Kingdom	The steamship ran aground in the Amur River. She was on a voyage from Nicolaieff, Russia to Antwerp, Belgium. She was refloated and resumed her voyage.
Beta	United Kingdom	The ship ran aground at "Port Alfred", Madeira. She was on a voyage from London to Madeira. She was refloated and found to be severely damaged.
Flying Spray	United Kingdom	The tug sprang a leak and was beached in Loch Ryan. She was on a voyage from Glasgow, Renfrewshire to Liverpool, Lancashire.
Vesta	United Kingdom	The schooner was run down and sunk off Whitby, Yorkshire by the steamship Fifeshire (United Kingdom). Her crew were rescued by Fifeshire. Vesta was on a voyage from Sunderland, County Durham to Lowestoft, Suffolk.

== 24 April ==
List of shipwrecks: 24 April 1876
Ship	State	Description
Swansea Packet	Tasmania	The ship was abandoned off the coast of Tasmania. Her crew were rescued by Malcolm Langworthy (New South Wales). Swansea Packet was on a voyage from Hobart to Launceston.

== 25 April ==
List of shipwrecks: 25 April 1876
Ship	State	Description
Maria Refina	Netherlands	The ship foundered in the North Sea. Her crew were rescued by the barque Dirigo (United States). Maria Refina was on a voyage from Leith, Lothian, United Kingdom to Danzig, Germany.

== 26 April ==
List of shipwrecks: 26 April 1876
Ship	State	Description
Fenny	Germany	The schooner collided with the steamship Lindisfarne (United Kingdom) and sank. Her crew were rescued by Lindisfarne. Fenny was on a voyage from Charlestown, Cornwall, United Kingdom to Stralsund.

== 27 April ==
List of shipwrecks: 27 April 1876
Ship	State	Description
Berndian	Denmark	The schooner was driven ashore and wrecked on the east coast of "Fecelave". Her crew were rescued. She was on a voyage from "Veile" to Malmö, Sweden.
Ellen Owen	United Kingdom	The ship was wrecked on The Smalls, off the coast of Pembrokeshire. Her crew were rescued by the yacht Trinity (United Kingdom). Ellen Owen was on a voyage from Workington, Cumberland to Swansea, Glamorgan.

== 28 April ==
List of shipwrecks: 28 April 1876
Ship	State	Description
Bavington	United Kingdom	The steam wherry was wrecked on the North Steel Rocks, off Boulmer, Northumberland. Her four crew were rescued by the Boulmer Lifeboat Robin Hood ( Royal National Lifeboat Institution). Bavington was on a voyage from Middlesbrough, Yorkshire to Dundee, Forfarshire.
Dauntless	United Kingdom	The schooner was wrecked on the Hen and Chicken Rocks, in the Firth of Forth. Her crew were rescued by the tug Blue Bonnet (United Kingdom). Dauntless was on a voyage from Clackmannan to a French port.
Duncan Dunbar	United Kingdom	The ship ran aground at St Andrews, Fife. She was on a voyage from Sunderland, County Durham to Burghead, Moray. She was refloated and taken in to St Andrews, where she sank.
Gustav	Sweden	The brig ran aground on a reef off Ven. She was on a voyage from Newcastle upon Tyne, Northumberland, United Kingdom to Skutskär. She was refloated the next day and taken in to Helsingør, Denmark.
Ouessant	France	The steamship foundered off Landéda, Finistère with the loss of 21 of the 23 people on board. She was on a voyage from Ouessant to Le Conquet.

== 29 April ==
List of shipwrecks: 29 April 1876
Ship	State	Description
Brothers	United Kingdom	The smack foundered off the Isle of May, Fife with the loss of four lives.
Cambridge	United Kingdom	The ship was abandoned in the Atlantic Ocean with the loss of a crew member. Survivors were rescued by Erl King. Cambridge was on a voyage from Greenock, Renfrewshire to Quebec City, Canada.
City of Lucknow	United Kingdom	The ship was driven ashore at New York, United States. She was on a voyage from New York to Bristol, Gloucestershire.
Elizabeth	United Kingdom	The Thames barge collided with the schooner Emma (United Kingdom) and sank in the River Thames at East Greenwich, Kent.
Hector	United Kingdom	The steamship ran aground at Copenhagen, Denmark. She was on a voyage from Newcastle upon Tyne, Northumberland to Copenhagen.
Herclades	United Kingdom	The ship was wrecked on the coast of Patagonia, Argentina. Her crew survived, according to a message in a bottle That washed up in the Bay of Luce in late October or early November 1877.
Northumberland	United Kingdom	The brig was wrecked at Yabucoa, Puerto Rico.
Veribert	Sweden	The ship was driven ashore near "Skaggenaes", Sweden. She was on a voyage from Oscarshamn to Hartlepool, County Durham, United Kingdom.

== 30 April ==
List of shipwrecks: 30 April 1876
Ship	State	Description
Charles	Sweden	The schooner was wrecked on the Haisborough Sands, in the North Sea off the coast of Norfolk, United Kingdom. Her crew were rescued by the brig Isabel ( (United Kingdom of Great Britain and Ireland) Guernsey). Charles was on a voyage from Gothenburg to Dunkirk, Nord, France.
Elizabeth Anderson	United Kingdom	The schooner ran aground on the Beamer Rock, in the Firth of Forth. She was on a voyage from Charlestown, Cornwall to Aberdeen.
Furst Borwin III	Germany	The schooner sprang a leak and was abandoned 8 nautical miles (15 km) south of Skomer Island, Pembrokeshire, United Kingdom. Her crew were rescued by Criterion (United Kingdom). Furst Borwin III was on a voyage from Swansea, Glamorgan to Cork, United Kingdom.
Happy Return	United Kingdom	The schooner was wrecked on the Goodwin Sands, Kent. Her crew were rescued by the tug Milton (United Kingdom).
Jean Amelie	France	The barque was driven ashore and wrecked in the Zealous Inlet, Chile. She was being escorted to Punta Arenas, Chile by the corvette Magallanes (Chilean Navy). She was refloated on 2 May with assistance from Magallanes but consequently sank.
Leander	United Kingdom	The schooner ran aground on The Shingles, off the Isle of Wight. She was on a voyage from Southampton, Hampshire to Portmadoc, Caernarfonshire. She was refloated.
Luisa	Spain	The brig was driven ashore and wrecked at "Portorclava", Cuba. Her crew were rescued She was on a voyage from Havana, Cuba to Santa Cruz de Tenerife, Canary Islands.
Minerva	United Kingdom	The steamship put in to Belle Île, Morbihan, France on fire. She was on a voyage from Bordeaux, Gironde, France to Glasgow, Renfrewshire.
Padeswood	United Kingdom	The schooner collided with Ellen Jones (United Kingdom) and sank off Skomer Island, Pembrokeshire. Her crew were rescued. She was on a voyage from the River Duddon to Swansea, Glamorgan.
Ruby	United Kingdom	The schooner ran aground on The Shingles. She was on a voyage from Cowes, Isle of Wight to Portmadoc. She was refloated and resumed her voyage.
Unnamed	United Kingdom	A smack ran aground on The Shingles. She was refloated and resumed her voyage.

== Unknown date ==
List of shipwrecks: Unknown date in April 1876
Ship	State	Description
Aboyne	United Kingdom	The steamship ran aground at Saltholm, Denmark before 24 April. She was refloated with assistance from the steamship Svitzer (Denmark) and towed in to Copenhagen, Denmark.
Ægidia and Pauline	Germany	The ship was abandoned in the Gulf of Mexico. Her crew were rescued by Challenge (United Kingdom).
Ann Wingate	United Kingdom	The schooner was wrecked on the Irish coast. Her crew were rescued.
A. Porter	United Kingdom	The ship was wrecked near White Island after 4 April with the loss of seventeen of her eighteen crew. She was on a voyage from Liverpool, Lancashire to Boston, Massachusetts, United States.
Auguste	Norway	The ship was abandoned at sea. Her crew were rescued. She was on a voyage from Norway to Miramichi, New Brunswick, Canada.
Belle	(Dominion of Newfoundland) Newfoundland Colony	The ship was driven ashore at Petty Harbour. She was on a voyage from Saint John's to Lisbon, Portugal. She was refloated and put back to Saint John's.
C. H. Foster	United Kingdom	The ship was driven ashore before 22 April. She was on a voyage from New York to Rio de Janeiro, Brazil. She was refloated and put in to New Bedford, Massachusetts.
Citomooi	Belgium	The ship was wrecked on or before 10 April. She was on a voyage from Rotterdam, South Holland, Netherlands to Riga, Russia.
City of Bangor	United Kingdom	The ship was driven ashore on Gigha, Inner Hebrides. She was refloated and towed in to Belfast, County Antrim for repairs.
Commodore	United Kingdom	The ship foundered in the North Sea off the coast of Norfolk with the loss of all three crew.
Congo	United Kingdom	The ship ran aground at Constantinople, Ottoman Empire. She was refloated on 25 April and taken in to Constantinople in a severely leaky condition.
Cygnet	United Kingdom	The ship was lost on the Brice Girdle, off Wells-next-the-Sea, Norfolk with the loss of all hands.
Dobra Nazeda	Austria-Hungary	The barque was abandoned in a sinking condition before 5 April. Her crew were rescued by the barque Maresca (Italy). Dobra Nazeda was on a voyage from Newport, Monmouthshire, United Kingdom to Odesa, Russia.
HMS Eclipse	Royal Navy	The Eclipse-class sloop ran aground at Antigua.
Elegante Julie	France	The sloop was driven ashore near Pauillac, Gironde before 15 April. Her crew were rescued.
Elizabeth	United Kingdom	The ship ran aground at Dunfanaghy, County Donegal.
Emma L. Oulton	United Kingdom	The barque foundered in the Atlantic Ocean with the loss of six of the fifteen people on board. Survivors were rescued by a Norwegian ship. She was on a voyage from Baltimore, Maryland to Ardrossan, Ayrshire.
Erick	Denmark	The ship was driven ashore at Copenhagen. She was refloated on 10 April and towed in to Copenhagen.
Haabet	Denmark	The schooner was run down and sunk off the Danish coast by the steamship Rügenwalde (Germany). Her crew were rescued by Rügenwalde.
Henry Halway	United States	The schooner was wrecked on the coast of Long Island, New York.
H. G. Fay	Canada	The ship was driven ashore and wrecked at Cape Hatteras, North Carolina, United States. She was on a voyage from Jamaica to New York City, United States.
Jowad	Persia	The steamship was wrecked in the Arabian Sea with the loss of about 500 lives. There were three survivors. She was on a voyage from "Shehr" to Bushire.
Kearsarge	United States	The fishing schooner was lost on the Grand Banks of Newfoundland with the loss of all eleven crew.
Margaret	United Kingdom	The brig ran aground on the Trindelgrund. She was refloated and taken in to Gothenburg, Sweden in a derelict condition.
Mattie B. Russel	United States	The barque was driven ashore at Vineyard Haven, Massachusetts. She was later refloated.
Myrtleford	United Kingdom	The ship was driven ashore on Kangaroo Island, South Australia before 18 April. She was on a voyage from Adelaide, South Australia to London. She was refloated and resumed her voyage.
Namaqua	United Kingdom	The steamship was wrecked 200 nautical miles (370 km) north of Cape Town, Cape Colony. All on board were rescued. She was on a voyage from Cape Town to Hondeklip, Cape Colony.
Orfeo	United Kingdom	The ship was abandoned in the Atlantic Ocean. Her crew were rescued. She was on a voyuage from Pascagoula, Puerto Rico to Liverpool, Lancashire.
Roska	Flag unknown	The ship was driven ashore at Copenhagen. She was on a voyage from Liepāja, Russia to Ghent, East Flanders, Belgium. She was refloated and towed in to Kastrup, Denmark.
Unnamed	Flag unknown	A ship was wrecked near San Sebastián, Spain. Four crew were rescued.
