= List of shipwrecks in November 1878 =

The list of shipwrecks in November 1878 includes ships sunk, foundered, grounded, or otherwise lost during November 1878.

== 1 November ==
List of shipwrecks: 1 November 1878
Ship	State	Description
America	United States	The schooner grounded near the entrance to Grand Haven, Michigan in a gale and heavy seas in Lake Michigan. Eight rescued by the United States Life Saving Service.
Australia	United States	The schooner missed the entrance to Grand Haven hitting a pier in a gale and heavy seas in Lake Michigan. She grounded 20 feet (6.1 m) from the pier and was wrecked. One killed, six rescued by the United States Life Saving Service.
Brockley	United Kingdom	The tug collided with the steamship Kildare (United Kingdom) in the River Mersey and was severely damaged. She was taken in to Liverpool, Lancashire.
David S.	Italy	The ship caught fire in the Aegean Sea and was beached. Her crew were rescued. She was on a voyage from Granton, Lothian, United Kingdom to Odesa, Russia.
Ino	United Kingdom	The schooner was driven ashore on Heligoland. She was on a voyage from Bremen, Germany to Dunkirk, Nord, France. She was refloated and taken in to Cuxhaven, Germany in a leaky condition .
J. H. Rutter	United States	The schooner was wrecked in a storm near Ludington, Michigan. Though declared a total loss, she was raised, repaired and returned to service in 1879.
L. C. Woodruff	United States	The barque dragged anchor in a gale in Lake Michigan off White Lake into the breakers 150 yards (140 m) offshore 1/2 nautical mile (0.93 km) north of the lake entrance early in the morning, sinking in 13 feet (4.0 m) of water. Broke up around sundown. Of her crew six killed, four rescued, or three killed and seven rescued, by the United States Life Saving Service.
Marianne	Germany	The ship departed from Cardiff, Glamorgan, United Kingdom for Copenhagen, Denmark. No further trace, reported missing.
Montpelier	United States	The schooner grounded on the wreck of the steamship Orion knocking a hole in her bottom and causing her to sink near the entrance to Grand Haven, Michigan in a gale and heavy seas in Lake Michigan. Eight rescued by the United States Life Saving Service.
Ottercape	United Kingdom	The steamship ran aground at Sunderland, County Durham. She was refloated and taken in to Sunderland.
Peruvian	United Kingdom	The schooner was driven ashore and wrecked at Leswalt, Wigtownshire. Her crew were rescued. She was on a voyage from Ayr to Belfast, County Antrim.
Providence	United Kingdom	The brigantine ran aground on the Cross Sand, in the North Sea off the coast of Norfolk. She was on a voyage from Newcastle upon Tyne, Northumberland to Penzance, Cornwall. She was refloated and taken in to Great Yarmouth, Norfolk in a waterlogged condition.

== 2 November ==
List of shipwrecks: 2 November 1878
Ship	State	Description
Aline	United Kingdom	The barque was wrecked on a reef off Yori-shima, Loochoo Islands, Japan. She was on a voyage from Takao, Formosa to Hyogo, Japan.
Asphodel	United Kingdom	The barque was driven ashore 20 nautical miles (37 km) east of East London, Cape Colony.
HMS Malabar	Royal Navy	The Euphrates-class troopship became disabled in the English Channel 17 nautical miles (31 km) east south east of Prawle Point, Devon due to an engine breakdown. She was taken in tow by the steamship Benjamin Whitworth (United Kingdom). Two Admiralty tugs assisted Benjamin Whitworth in taking HMS Malabar in to Plymouth, Devon. The troopship was on a voyage from Portsmouth, Hampshire to India.
S. J. Bogart	United States	The barque ran aground 10 nautical miles (19 km) west of Rouen, Seine-Inférieure, France. She was on a voyage from New York to Rouen. She was refloated.
Terese	United Kingdom	The barque was abandoned off East London. She came ashore 20 nautical miles (37 km) east of East London.

== 3 November ==
List of shipwrecks: 3 November 1878
Ship	State	Description
Knud, and Rostock	(Norway); Germany	The steamships collided in the Baltic Sea and were both severely damaged. Knud was on a voyage from Riga, Russia to Antwerp, Belgium. She put in to "Lappegrunden". Rostock was on a voyage from Bergen, Norway to Copenhagen, Denmark. She put in to Helsingør, Denmark in a severely leaky condition.
Penelope	United Kingdom	The barque collided with the steamship Celeste (United Kingdom) and was abandoned in the North Sea 14 nautical miles (26 km) south east of Tynemouth Castle, Northumberland. Her nine crew were taken on by a pilot coble. Penelope was on a voyage from Gävle, Sweden to Hartlepool, County Durham. She was subsequently towed in to Hartlepool.

== 4 November ==
List of shipwrecks: 4 November 1878
Ship	State	Description
Djemnah	(France)	The steamship was driven ashore at La Joliette, Bouches-du-Rhône. She was on a voyage from Marseille, Bouches-du-Rhône to China. Her 141 passengers were taken off. She was refloated and put back to Marseille.
Hercules	United Kingdom	The steam barge collided with City of Baltimore (United Kingdom) and sank in the River Mersey at Birkenhead, Cheshire with the loss of five lives. Survivors were rescued by City of Baltimore and the tug Ranger (United Kingdom).
Martin	United Kingdom	The steamship ran aground on the Chapman Sand, in the Thames Estuary. She was on a voyage from Hamburg, Germany to London. She was refloated and resumed her voyage.
Ocean Home	Norway	The barque was towed in to Grimsby, Lincolnshire, United Kingdom in a derelict and waterlogged condition.
Sicilian	Flag unknown	The ship was driven ashore. She was on a voyage from New York, United States to Stettin, Germany. She was refloated and put back to New York.
Stagshaw	United Kingdom	The ship ran aground on the Maplin Sand, in the North Sea off the coast of Essex. She was on a voyage from Kronstadt, Russia to Gravesend, Kent. She was refloated and towed in to Gravesend.
Urania	(United Kingdom)	The brig was wrecked on Læsø, Denmark.
Widdington	United Kingdom	The steamship was wrecked on the Staur Holmen Rigg, off Gotland, Sweden with the loss of two of her crew. She was on a voyage from Kronstadt, Russia to London.

== 5 November ==
List of shipwrecks: 5 November 1878
Ship	State	Description
Cambodge	France	The barque was wrecked at Vizagapatam, India with some loss of life.
Celt	United Kingdom	The steamship was driven ashore at Carnsore, County Wexford. She was on a voyage from Dunkirk, Nord, France to Glasgow, Renfrewshire.
Fifeshire	United Kingdom	The full-rigged ship was wrecked at Vizagapatam with the loss of seventeen of her 22 crew. She was on a voyage from Bimlipatam to Madras, India.
Forresian	United Kingdom	The brig was run down and sunk off Málaga, Spain by the steamship Pasajes (Spain) with the loss of all but two of those on board. Survivors were rescued by Pasajes.
Gazelle	United States	The schooner grounded on Long Island, New York and broke up. Some equipment was salvaged. Her crew of three rescued by the United States Life Saving Service.
Janet Forbes	United Kingdom	The barque was driven ashore west of Dunkirk, Nord, France. She was on a voyage from Dunkirk to Baltimore, Maryland, United States.
John Hullet	United Kingdom	The brig ran aground on the Lillegrunden. She was on a voyage from Vyborg, Grand Duchy of Finland to London. She was refloated with the assistance of a steamship and taken in to Copenhagen, Denmark.
Metlania	Spain	The brig was driven ashore in the Baie d'Authie. She was on a voyage from Baltimore, Maryland, United States to Saint-Valery-sur-Somme, Somme, France.
Olive Branch	United Kingdom	The barque was wrecked at Bimlipatam, India with some loss of life.
Unnamed	United States	The schooner grounded 1 nautical mile (1.9 km) north of the Two Rivers, Wisconsin Life Saving Station in heavy seas. Her crew of three rescued by the United States Life Saving Service.

== 6 November ==
List of shipwrecks: 6 November 1878
Ship	State	Description
Fear Not	United Kingdom	The schooner was driven ashore and wrecked at Hayle, Cornwall whilst being towed by the tug North Star (United Kingdom).
Heligan	United Kingdom	The schooner sprung a leak and sank off Lundy Island, Devon while on a voyage from Cardiff, Glamorgan to Gweek, Cornwall. Two crew drowned and two were picked up by a passing steamship.
Lizzie Olson	United Kingdom	The ship was sighted off The Lizard, Cornwall whilst on a voyage from Runcorn, Cheshire to Newcastle upon Tyne, Northumberland. No further trace, reported missing.
Zenith	United Kingdom	The steamship ran aground off "Pouliquen", Loire-Inférieure.
Unnamed	Flag unknown	The schooner run into by the steamship John O. Scott (United Kingdom) and sank in the North Sea off Hartlepool, County Durham, United Kingdom with the loss of all hands.

== 7 November ==
List of shipwrecks: 7 November 1878
Ship	State	Description
Charlotte	United Kingdom	The schooner sank in the Irish Sea 15 nautical miles (28 km) off St. Ann's Head, Pembrokeshire. Her crew survived. She was on a voyage from Poole, Dorset to Runcorn, Cheshire.
Darley	United Kingdom	The schooner ran aground at Southwold, Suffolk. She was on a voyage from Hartlepool, County Durham to Southwold.
Wacousta	Canada	The schooner grounded 1 1/2 nautical miles (2.8 km) from the pier and one mile (1.6 km) offshore at Charlotte, New York in a gale and snowstorm and heavy seas in Lake Ontario. Her crew of six were rescued by the United States Life Saving Service.

== 8 November ==
List of shipwrecks: 8 November 1878
Ship	State	Description
Blue Jacket	United Kingdom	The schooner was abandoned in the North Sea 50 nautical miles (93 km) off the mouth of the Humber. Her crew were rescued by the barque Galilee (Denmark). Blue Jacket was on a voyage from London to Middlesbrough, Yorkshire. She was still afloat a week later.
Caroline	France	The barque was driven ashore at Dunkirk, Nord. She was on a voyage from Antofagasta, Chile to Dunkirk. She was refloated on 16 November.
Helligan	United Kingdom	The schooner foundered in the Bristol Channel off Lundy Island, Devon with the loss of two of her four crew. She was on a voyage from Cardiff, Glamorgan to Gweek, Cornwall.
Isabella	United Kingdom	The Thames barge was driven ashore and wrecked at Westgate-on-Sea, Kent. Her crew were rescued.
Levant	United Kingdom	The steamship ran aground in the Danube 37 nautical miles (69 km) from its mouth.
Mary Ann	United Kingdom	The fishing vessel was run down and sunk off the Eddystone Rocks, Cornwall by Woodlark (United Kingdom). Her crew were rescued by Woodlark.
Mathilde	Norway	The brig was driven ashore 4 nautical miles (7.4 km) north of Donna Nook, Lincolnshire, United Kingdom. All ten people on board were rescued by the Donna Nook Lifeboat. She was on a voyage from Larvik to Hull, Yorkshire, United Kingdom.
Nelson	United Kingdom	The full-rigged ship was driven ashore at Dunkirk.
Notre Dame	United Kingdom	The ketch was driven ashore at Grimsby, Lincolnshire. She was on a voyage from Hull to Buckie, Moray. She was refloated with the assistance of a tug and taken in to Grimsby.
Raven	United Kingdom	The smack was driven ashore near Rhyl, Denbighshire. Her crew were rescued by the Rhyl Lifeboat.
Speedwell	Canada	The schooner grounded 4 nautical miles (7.4 km) west of Oswego, New York in a gale and snowstorm and heavy seas in Lake Ontario. Her crew of seven were rescued by the United States Life Saving Service.
Virgo	United Kingdom	The brigantine was wrecked on the Longsand, in the North Sea off the coast of Essex. All eight people on board got aboard the Sunk Lightship ( Trinity House), from where were rescued by the smack Reindeer. Virgo was on a voyage from London to "Kidby".
Unnamed	flag unknown	The steamship ran aground in Liverpool Bay.
Unnamed	United Kingdom	The Mersey Flat was driven ashore. Her crew were rescued by the Rhyl Lifeboat.

== 9 November ==
List of shipwrecks: 9 November 1878
Ship	State	Description
Albion	Canada	The brigantine was abandoned in the Atlantic Ocean. Her crew were rescued by Eliza Ann Matilda (Norway). Albion was on a voyage from Annapolis, Maryland, United States to London, United Kingdom.
Alblasserdam	Netherlands	The full-rigged ship was wrecked on the Banjaard Sand, in the North Sea off the coast of Zeeland with the loss of 40 crew. She was on a voyage from "Pangool", Java, Netherlands East Indies to Rotterdam, South Holland.
Bellona	United Kingdom	The sloop was driven ashore near Royan, Seine-Inférieure, France. Her four crew were rescued. She was on a voyage from Falmouth, Cornwall to Arbroath, Forfarshire.
Betty	United Kingdom	The ship was driven ashore at Lowestoft, Suffolk. Her crew were rescued.
Bo-peep	United Kingdom	The ship was driven ashore at Mundesley, Norfolk. Her crew were rescued. She was on a voyage from Shoreham-by-Sea, Sussex to Sunderland, County Durham.
Carlotta	New Zealand	The barque was wrecked near Wellington Harbour. All hands were saved.
Catherine	United Kingdom	The sloop was wrecked on the coast of the Mull of Kintyre, Argyllshire. She was on a voyage from Ardrossan, Ayrshire to the Mull of Kintyre.
Comet	United Kingdom	The schooner was driven ashore and wrecked at Milbay, Devon. Her crew were rescued. She was on a voyage from Sligo to London.
Devonshire	United Kingdom	The steamship ran aground in the River Tyne at Sunderland.
Fanchon	United Kingdom	The ship ran aground off Domesnes, Russia and was wrecked. Her crew were rescued. She was on a voyage from Riga, Russia to Hartlepool, County Durham.
Frederike	Germany	The ship ran aground in the Baltic Sea off "Hasan". Her crew were rescued.
George	United Kingdom	The brig ran aground on the Cross Sand. She was refloated and towed in to Dover, Kent.
George	United Kingdom	The fishing smack was driven ashore at Lowestoft.
Helena	United Kingdom	The schooner collided with the schooner Electryon (United Kingdom) and sank in the North Sea 12 nautical miles (22 km) south of the Newarp Lightship ( Trinity House) with the loss of one of her five crew. Survivors were rescued by Electryon. Helena was on a voyage from the River Duddon to Newcastle upon Tyne, Northumberland.
Iris	United Kingdom	The schooner struck the Sunk Sand, in the North Sea off the coast of Essex and sank. Her crew were rescued by the smack Paul (United Kingdom). Iris was on a voyage from Northfleet, Kent to Newcastle upon Tyne.
Johanna	Germany	The schooner foundered in the North Sea 20 nautical miles (37 km) off the Noord Hinder Lightship (Netherlands). Her crew were rescued. She was on a voyage from Plymouth, Devon, United Kingdom to Hamburg.
John and Harriet	United Kingdom	The ship was driven ashore and wrecked at Salthouse, Norfolk. Her crew were rescued. She was on a voyage from London to Grimsby, Lincolnshire.
John Pardew	United Kingdom	The ship was driven ashore at Plymouth and was severely damaged. She was on a voyage from Charlestown, Cornwall to Runcorn, Cheshire.
Larch	United Kingdom	The steamship ran aground in the River Tyne at Sunderland. She was refloated.
Lily	United Kingdom	The ship was driven ashore at Lowestoft. Her crew were rescued.
Lima	United Kingdom	The steamship collided with the steamship Westminster (United Kingdom) and was beached at Tilbury, Essex. Lima was on a voyage from the River Thames to the River Tyne.
Peace	United Kingdom	The brigantine was driven ashore and wrecked in Ballinskelligs Bay. Her crew were rescued. She was on a voyage from Liverpool, Lancashire to Limerick.
Mystery	United Kingdom	The samck was abandoned of the coast of Norfolk. She ran aground on the Scroby Sands, floated off and ran aground on the Middle Sand. She was refloated and taken in to Great Yarmouth, Norfolk in a derelict condition .
Neptun	Sweden	The barque was driven ashore. She was refloated and taken in to Helsingborg.
Old Goody	United Kingdom	The ship ran aground off Great Yarmouth. She was refloated with assistance from the Gorleston Lifeboat Leicester ( Royal National Lifeboat Institution) and taken in to Great Yarmouth.
Ono	United Kingdom	The brigantine was abandoned off The Lizard, Cornwall. Her crew were rescued by Alma (United Kingdom). Ono was towed in to Portland, Dorset by Lionel (United Kingdom) on 12 November.
Phœbus	United Kingdom	The brig ran aground on the Sunk Sand. She was on a voyage from Helsingborg, Sweden to London. Her nine crew were rescued by the smack Volunteer (United Kingdom). Phoebus was refloated the next day and taken in to Harwich, Essex in a severely damaged and waterlogged condition.
Phoenix	United Kingdom	The ketch was wrecked on the coast of Nord, France. She was on a voyage from Sunderland to Abbeville, Somme, France.
Primula	Norway	The brigantine was beached at Holyhead, Anglesey, United Kingdom and was severely damaged. She was on a voyage from Garston, Lancashire to Norway.
R. C. Bulgin	Germany	The ship departed from Galveston, Texas, United States for Liverpool. No further trace, reported missing.
Sarah Ann	United Kingdom	The brig was driven ashore at Lowestoft. Her crew were rescued.
Twelve Apostles	United Kingdom	The schooner ran aground at Amager, Denmark. She was on a voyage from Stettin, Germany to Penzance, Cornwall. She was refloated on 11 November with the assistance of a steamship and taken in to Copenhagen, Denmark, for repairs.
Urania	United Kingdom	The ship ran aground off the Mumbles, Glamorgan. She was on a voyage from Le Tréport, Seine-Inférieure, France to Liverpool. She was refloated and taken in to Swansea, Glamorgan.
William Jones	United Kingdom	The schooner departed from Youghal, County Cork for Bridgwater, Somerset. No further trace, presumed foundered with the loss of all six crew.
Zephyr	United Kingdom	The schooner ran aground on Scroby Sands, Norfolk. She was on a voyage from London to Leven, Fife. She was refloated and found to be severely leaky. She was assisted in to Great Yarmouth, Norfolk by a tug.

== 10 November ==
List of shipwrecks: 10 November 1878
Ship	State	Description
Dryad	United Kingdom	The steam lighter was driven ashore and wrecked at Anstruther, Fife. Her crew were rescued by the Anstruther Lifeboat Admiral Fitzroy ( Royal National Lifeboat Institution). Dryad was on a voyage from Montrose, Forfarshire to Campbeltown, Argyllshire. She was refloated on 14 November.
Ebenezer	Germany	The barque foundered in the English Channel off Hastings, Sussex, United Kingdom. Her ten crew were rescued by the steamship Ferndale (United Kingdom). Ebenezer was on a voyage from Havre de Grâce, Seine-Inférieure, France to Buenos Aires, Argentina.
Edward and Emma	United Kingdom	The schooner collided with the steamship Rydal Hall and was abandoned by her crew, who got aboard the steamship. Edward and Emma was on a voyage from Bangor, Caernarfonshire to Liverpool, Lancashire. She was towed in to Liverpool by the tug Kingfisher (United Kingdom).
Enterprise	United Kingdom	The ship was driven ashore at Kingsdown, Kent. She was on a voyage from London to Cardiff, Glamorgan. She was refloated and put back to Gravesend, Kent
Francis	Norway	The ship ran aground on the Longsand, in the North Sea off the coast of Essex, United Kingdom and sank. Her crew were rescued. She was on a voyage from Mandal to a port in North Carolina, United States.
Gustav	Norway	The ship was abandoned in the Dogger Bank. Her crew were rescued by Argus (Germany).
Il Tipo	Italy	The barque was wrecked on the coast of Haiti.
Industry	United Kingdom	The lugger ran aground on the Shingle Sand, in the North Sea off the coast of Kent. She was refloated with assistance from the Margate Lifeboat Friend to all Nations ( Royal National Lifeboat Institution) and taken in to Margate, Kent.
Jacob Johann	Germany	The schooner was driven ashore at Nexø, Denmark. She was on a voyage from Danzig to "Aahines".
Rebecca	Germany	The barque ran aground at Dragør, Denmark. She was refloated and taken in to Copenhagen, Denmark.
Yorin	United Kingdom	The steamship ran aground on the Holm Sands, in the North Sea off the coast of Suffolk. Her 21 crew were rescued by the Lowestoft Lifeboat Samuel Plimsoll ( Royal National Lifeboat Institution). Yorin was on a voyage from Riga, Russia to London. She was refloated.

== 11 November ==
List of shipwrecks: 11 November 1878
Ship	State	Description
A. A. Wignall	United Kingdom	The ship collided with another vessel and ran aground. She was on a voyage from Liverpool, Lancashire to the River Tyne. She was refloated and taken in to Great Yarmouth, Norfolk in a severely damaged and severely leaky condition.
Ann	(United Kingdom of Great Britain and Ireland) Guernsey	The schooner was abandoned off Lowestoft, Suffolk. Her crew were rescued by the Lowestoft Lifeboat. She was on a voyage from London to the River Tyne. She was subsequently taken in to Lowestoft in a leaky condition.
Attila	Austria-Hungary	The barque was driven ashore at Aracati, Brazil. She was on a voyage from Ceará to Aracati. She was a total loss.
Comet	United Kingdom	The wherry was driven ashore and severely damaged at Maryport, Cumberland. She was on a voyage from "Benne" to Maryport. She was refloated and towed in to Maryport.
Elisha	United Kingdom	The smack was run down and sunk in the North Sea by a German vessel with the loss of a crew member.
Falcon	United Kingdom	The schooner ran aground at Wick, Caithness. She was on a voyage from Wick to the Orkney Islands. She was refloated and put back to Wick.
Germania	Germany	The ship departed from Cuxhaven for New York, United States. No further trace, posted missing.
Gilpin	United Kingdom	The ship ran aground at Neath, Glamorgan. She was on a voyage from Swansea, Glamorgan to Pernambuco, Brazil She was refloated the next day and towed in to Neath.
Gorm	Denmark	The steamship ran aground on the Holm Sand, in the North Sea off the coast of Suffolk. All 21 people on board were rescued by the Lowestoft Lifeboat Samuel Plimsoll ( Royal National Lifeboat Institution). Gorm was on a voyage from Copenhagen to London. She was refloated and taken in to Lowestoft in a leaky condition.
Kate	(United Kingdom of Great Britain and Ireland) Guernsey	The brig was abandoned in the North Sea. Her nine crew were rescued by a smack. She was on a voyage from London to South Shields, County Durham.
Landwood	United Kingdom	The brig was driven ashore and severely damaged at Maryport. She was on a voyage from Londonderry to Maryport.
Margaret	United Kingdom	The schooner ran aground and was wrecked off Thorpeness, Sufolk. Her five crew were rescued by the Thorpeness Lifeboat Ipswich ( Royal National Lifeboat Institution). Margaret was on a voyage from Goole, Yorkshire to London. She came ashore at Sizewell, Suffolk.
Meteore	France	The barque struck a rock and sank at Lormont, Gironde. She was on a voyage from Cardiff, Glamorgan to Bordeaux, Gironde.
Piako	United Kingdom	The ship caught fire in the Atlantic Ocean. Of her passengers, the women and children were put into boats and were rescued by Loch Doon (United Kingdom). Piako was on a voyage from London to New Zealand. She was scuttled on 16 November. Her crew and the male passengers reached "Cocoa Nut Island", from where they were rescued six weeks later.
Prosperous	United Kingdom	The ship was driven ashore at Swansea. She was on a voyage from Liverpool, Lancashire to Llanelly, Glamorgan.
Star	United Kingdom	The schooner ran aground on Carn Marvel, in the Isles of Scilly. She was on a voyage from the Isles of Scilly to Cardiff, Glamorgan. She was refloated with the assistance of a steamship and taken in to St. Mary's, Isles of Scilly.
Utopia	United Kingdom	The ship was driven ashore and severely damaged at Maryport. She was on a voyage from Belfast, County Antrim to Maryport. She was refloated and taken in to Maryport.
Youn	United Kingdom	The steamship ran aground on the Holm Sand. Her 21 crew were rescued by the Lowestoft Lifeboat Samuel Plimsoll ( Royal National Lifeboat Institution). Youn was on a voyage from Riga, Russia to London. She was refloated and taken in to Lowestoft.
Three unnamed vessels	Flags unknown	The ships were wrecked off Pakefield, Suffolk. Their crews were rescued.

== 12 November ==
List of shipwrecks: 12 November 1878
Ship	State	Description
Ann Eliza	United Kingdom	The cutter was driven ashore at Whitstable, Kent.
Annie White	United Kingdom	The brigantine was driven ashore and severely damaged at Whitstable.
Antelope	United Kingdom	The schooner was driven ashore at Scrabster, Caithnes. Her crew survived.
City of Tanjore	United Kingdom	The full-rigged ship was driven ashore at Dungeness, Kent. She was on a voyage from London to Adelaide, South Australia. She was refloated with the assistance of two tugs and resumed her voyage.
Gemma Parodi	Italy	The barque ran aground and sank at the mouth of the River Tees. Her eighteen crew were rescued by the paddle tug Nunthorpe (United Kingdom). Gemma Parodi was on a voyage from Middlesbrough, Yorkshire, United Kingdom to Genoa.
Glenearn	United Kingdom	The steamship ran aground at Hong Kong. She was on a voyage from London to Hong Kong. She was refloated.
Haabet	(Russian Empire) Grand Duchy of Finland	The schooner foundered in the North Sea off Lowestoft, Suffolk, United Kingdom. Her crew survived.
John and Edwin	United Kingdom	The brigantine was driven ashore and severely damaged at Whitstable.
Londesborough	United Kingdom	The brig was driven ashore and wrecked at Whitstable.
Jabez	United Kingdom	The fishing boat drifted onto rocks at Clodgy Point, Cornwall in a gale with the loss of three of her five cew.
Mary Ann Mackay	United Kingdom	The brigantine was driven ashore and severely damaged at Whitstable.
Stephen and Sarah	United Kingdom	The ship was driven ashore and severely damaged at Whitstable.
Unnamed	United Kingdom	The fishing boat was driven ashore and wrecked at St. Ives, Cornwall with the loss of three of her five crew.

== 13 November ==
List of shipwrecks: 13 November 1878
Ship	State	Description
Adele	France	The ship foundered off Belle Île, Morbihan. Her crew were rescued. She was on a voyage from Bilbao, Spain to Rouen, Seine-Inférieure.
Atlantic	United Kingdom	The ship ran aground on the Swin Middle Bank, in the Thames Estuary. She was on a voyage from London to Tønsberg, Germany. She was refloated and put back to Gravesend, Kent.
Baynes	United Kingdom	The schooner was driven ashore and wrecked on Heligoland. Her crew survived. She was on a voyage from Ystad, Sweden to London.
Carcand	Flag unknown	The schooner ran aground off Isle Madame, Nova Scotia, Canada. She was on a voyage from Cape Canso, Nova Scotia to Saint Pierre and Miquelon.
Emily Jane	United Kingdom	The ship was driven ashore at Herne Bay, Kent. Her crew were rescued. She was on a voyage from Dover, Kent to London.
Maria	United Kingdom	The brig was abandoned in the English Channel 20 nautical miles (37 km) west of Guernsey, Channel Islands. Her crew survived. She was on a voyage from Middlesbrough, Yorkshire to Newport, Monmouthshire.
Oni	(Russian Empire) Grand Duchy of Finland	The schooner was driven ashore at Rouen, Seine-Inférieure, France. Her crew were rescued. She was on a voyage from London to Christiania, Norway.
Ridesdale	United Kingdom	The barque ran aground on the Goodwin Sands, Kent. She was on a voyage from Hull, Yorkshire to Southampton, Hampshire. She was refloated with assistance from the tug Aid and the Ramsgate Lifeboat and taken in to Ramsgate, Kent.
Vorobey	Russia	The transport ship foundered in the Black Sea off Sukhumi with the loss of fourteen of her sixteen crew. She was on a voyage from Nicholaieff to Poti.
Unnamed	United Kingdom	The smack was driven ashore and severely damaged at Leith, Lothian. She was refloated and taken in to Granton, Lothian.

== 14 November ==
List of shipwrecks: 14 November 1878
Ship	State	Description
Alice	United Kingdom	The schooner departed from Berwick upon Tweed, Northumberland for Great Yarmouth, Norfolk. No further trace, presumed foundered with the loss of all four crew.
Bessie	United Kingdom	The collier hit the western side of the Hayle Estuary and floated off and was carried by the wind and tide to the eastern side of the river. Bessie later became high and dry on Hayle Bar and her cargo and rigging were removed in an attempt to refloat her.
Elise	Flag unknown	The ship was driven ashore and wrecked at Westkapelle, Zeeland, Netherlands.
F. Edward	United Kingdom	The brigantine ran aground on the Cross Sand, in the North Sea off the coast of Norfolk and sank. Her crew were rescued by the Caister Lifeboat. She was on a voyage from Grimsby, Lincolnshire to Gravesend, Kent.
Heinrich	Germany	The brig was driven ashore in Aalbek Bay. She was on a voyage from Königsberg to Cardiff, Glamorgan, United Kingdom.
Maria Augusta	Germany	The ship was wrecked at San Ferdinando, Italy. Her crew were rescued She was on a voyage from Gioia Tauro, Italy to Glasgow, Renfrewshire, United Kingdom.

== 15 November ==
List of shipwrecks: 15 November 1878
Ship	State	Description
Anna Victoria	Russia	The ship ran aground near Ystad, Sweden. She was on a voyage from Pärnu to Schiedam, South Holland, Netherlands.
Armstrong	United Kingdom	The steamship foundered in the North Sea 20 nautical miles (37 km) east south east of the mouth of the Humber with the loss of all hands. She was on a voyage from South Shields, County Durham to London.
Artemis	United Kingdom	The ship was driven ashore near Sandhamn, Sweden. She was on a voyage from Sandhamn to London. She was refloated and resumed her voyage.
Davide S	France	The ship caught fire at sea. She was towed in to "Ergasteria", Greece by a British steamship.
Jansjen	Germany	The ship was driven ashore at Hellebæk, Denmark. She was on a voyage from Leith, Lothian, United Kingdom to Danzig. She was later refloated and taken into port.
Smaragd	Norway	The brig ran aground in the Dardanelles and was wrecked. She was on a voyage from New York, United States to Odesa, Russia.
Tricolor	Denmark	The ship was driven ashore at Falsterbo, Sweden. She was on a voyage from Stockholm, Sweden to Penzance, Cornwall, United Kingdom.
W. H. Tucker	United Kingdom	The brig was abandoned at sea. Her crew were rescued by the barque Magnum (Norway). W. H. Tucker was on a voyage from Beaufort, South Carolina, United States to Belfast, County Antrim.
Unnamed	Spain	The felucca sank at Sanlúcar de Barrameda.

== 16 November ==
List of shipwrecks: 16 November 1878
Ship	State	Description
Eliza	United Kingdom	The schooner was driven ashore near Grainthorpe, Lincolnshire. Her crew were rescued by Deerhound (United Kingdom). She was refloated on 26 November and taken in to Grimsby, Lincolnshire.
Eunomia	Germany	The brigantine was driven ashore at Cleethorpes, Lincolnshire. She was on a voyage from Honfleur, Manche, France to Sunderland, County Durham, United Kingdom. She was refloated on 25 November and towed in to Grimsby, Lincolnshire.
Hoppett	Sweden	The barque was driven ashore and wrecked at Farsund, Norway. Her crew were rescued. She was on a voyage from Hartlepool, County Durham to Kalmar, Sweden. She was refloated and taken in to Farsund. The wreck was advertised to be sold.
Ida Sofia	Sweden	The schooner was driven ashore at Clee Ness, Lincolnshire. She was on a voyage from Poole, Dorset to Newcastle upon Tyne, Northumberland, United Kingdom. She was refloated and taken in to Grimsby, Lincolnshire.
Isabel	Germany	The ship was driven ashore near Randsund, Norway. She was on a voyage from Härnösand, Sweden to Bristol, Gloucestershire, United Kingdom. She was refloated with assistance and taken in to Kristiansand, Norway.
Marcasite	United Kingdom	The steamship ran aground in the River Thames at Gravesend, Kent.
Oscar	Norway	The schooner was abandoned in the North Sea. Her crew were rescued by the schooner Phœnix (Denmark). Oscar was on a voyage from Hartlepool to Brevig.
Patriot	United Kingdom	The ship was driven ashore and wrecked at Barmston, Yorkshire. Her seven crew were rescued by the Bridlington Lifeboat John Abbott ( Royal National Lifeboat Institution). Patriot was on a voyage from Schiedam, South Holland, Netherlands to Newcastle upon Tyne.
Sea Flower	United Kingdom	The schooner was driven ashore at Clee Ness. Her crew were rescued by the Cleethorpes Lifeboat. She subsequently caught fire and was a total loss.
Star	United Kingdom	The schooner struck Carn Morval, while leaving the Isles of Scilly for Cardiff, Glamorgan. Lady of the Isles (United Kingdom) towed her off and brought her into Hugh Town.
Unnamed	Flag unknown	The steamship foundered off the mouth of the River Tyne.
Unnamed	Flag unknown	The brig was driven ashore near Grainthorpe.

== 17 November ==
List of shipwrecks: 17 November 1878
Ship	State	Description
Anne	United Kingdom	The brig was driven ashore at North Somercotes, Lincolnshire with the loss of all hands. She was on a voyage from Sunderland, County Durham to Arbroath, Forfarshire.
Caroline Kystar	Germany	The brig ran aground and sank at "Sevelskoer", Denmark. Her crew were rescued.
Deerfoot	United Kingdom	The barque was run down and sunk in the Hawk Roads, off Spurn Point, Yorkshire by the steamship Angelo (United Kingdom) with the loss of one of the fifteen people on board. Survivors were rescued by Angelo. Deerfoot was on a voyage from London to South Shields, County Durham.
Emanuel	Sweden	The schooner was driven ashore and wrecked at Thisted, Denmark. She was on a voyage from Helsingborg to Hythe, Kent, United Kingdom.
Enio	Austria-Hungary	The barque was driven ashore at Lagos, Portugal. Her crew were rescued. She was a total loss.
Jalawar	United Kingdom	The barque was abandoned at sea. Her crew were rescued by Mangalore (India). Jalawar was on a voyage from Madras to Anjer, Netherlands East Indies.
Johannes Koster	Germany	The ship was driven ashore and wrecked at "Segelskaret". She was on a voyage from Porvoo, Grand Duchy of Finland to an English port.
Memphis	United Kingdom	The steamship was driven ashore at Copenhagen, Denmark. She was on a voyage from Kronstadt, Russia to Hull, Yorkshire. She was refloated with the assistance of a steamship and resumed her voyage.
Rio	United Kingdom	The barque was driven ashore at Sagres, Portugal. She was on a voyage from Newport, Monmouthshire, United Kingdom to the Antilles.
Sunderland	Norway	The barque foundered in the North Sea. Her crew were rescued by a steamship.
Thalla	United Kingdom	The barque was damaged by ice and sank in the Southern Ocean. Her ten crew were rescued by the barque Mushka (United Kingdom). Thalla was on a voyage from Glasgow, Renfrewshire to Honolulu, Kingdom of Hawaii.
Walker	United Kingdom	The ship ran aground at Sunderland. She was on a voyage from Stettin, Germany to Sunderland.
Willem	United Kingdom	The schooner ran aground on the Middelgrund, in the Baltic Sea. She was on a voyage from Memel, Germany to Dordrecht, South Holland.
Unnamed	Sweden	The barque ran aground at "Holmetunge", Denmark.
Unnamed	Flag unknown	The schooner foundered in the North Sea with the loss of all seven people on board.
Unnamed	Russia	The schooner was driven ashore at Donna Nook. Her crew were rescued. She was on a voyage from Jomala, Grand Duchy of Finland to Hull.

== 18 November ==
List of shipwrecks: 18 November 1878
Ship	State	Description
Cronstadt	Russia	The steamship was driven ashore at the Porkkala Lighthouse, Grand Duchy of Finland.
Hooghly	France	The steamship was driven ashore and wrecked at Castillos, Uruguay. All on board were rescued. She was on a voyage from Bordeaux, Gironde to the River Plate.
Johanna Bengemann	Germany	The barque was abandoned by nine of her crew, who were rescued by the Donna Nook Lifeboat. Her captain and mate refused to leave. She was subsequently driven ashore at Saltfleet, Lincolnshire, United Kingdom. Both crew survived. Johanna Bengemann was on a voyage from Memel to Hull, Yorkshire and/or London, United Kingdom. She was refloated on 20 November and taken in to Hull.
Lynet	United Kingdom	The ship was driven ashore at Bahía Honda, Cuba. She was on a voyage from Cardiff to Havana, Cuba.
Macnear	United States	The ship was wrecked in the Columbia River. She was on a voyage from Hong Kong to Portland, Maine.
Neva	Russia	The ship steamship was driven ashore at Thiessow, Germany. She was on a voyage from Riga to Wolgast, Germany. She was refloated on 26 November and towed in to Griefswald, Germany.
Oxford	United Kingdom	The steamship was driven ashore at "Surrup", Russia. She was on a voyage from London to Reval, Russia.
Unnamed	Imperial Russian Navy	The barge was destroyed by the explosion of torpedoes on board with the loss of between twelve and twenty lives.

== 19 November ==
List of shipwrecks: 19 November 1878
Ship	State	Description
Allicance	United Kingdom	The steamship collided with the steamship Weardale (United Kingdom) in the Bute Channel and was beached. She was on a voyage from Cardiff, Glamorgan to Saint-Nazaire, Loire-Inférieure, France.
Anna	Denmark	The schooner foundered in the North Sea 40 nautical miles (74 km) off St Abb's Head, Berwickshire, United Kingdom. Her crew were rescued by the schooner Elena (United Kingdom).
Argelio	United Kingdom	The brig struck rocks and put in to Lorient, Morbihan, France. She was on a voyage from Trieste to Gloucester.
Cornwall	United Kingdom	The steamship ran aground on the Longships, Cornwall. She was on a voyage from Cardiff to Havre de Grâce, Seine-Inférieure, France. She was refloated and put in to Penzance, Cornwall.
Fram	Norway	The brig was driven ashore and wrecked at Cape Cod, Massachusetts, United States. Her crew rescued by the United States Life Saving Service. She was on a voyage from Stockholm, Sweden to Boston, Massachusetts.
Heathpool	United Kingdom	The steamship struck the pier and was beached at Sunderland, County Durham.
Margaret Banks	United Kingdom	The steamship ran aground in the Sulina branch of the Danube 38 nautical miles (70 km) from its mouth.
Norma	United Kingdom	The steamship ran aground in the River Tees. She was on a voyage from Middlesbrough, Yorkshire to Naples, Italy. She was refloated and put back to Middlesbrough.
Sigurd	Norway	The brig was driven ashore at Orfordness, Suffolk, United Kingdom. She was on a voyage from South Shields, County Durham to Cagliari, Sardinia, Italy. She was refloated the next day and towed in to Harwich, Essex, United Kingdom.
Tullochgorum	United Kingdom	The ship arrived at Mauritius on fire.
Unnamed	United Kingdom	The steamship ran aground on the Saltsckar Rocks, off Redcar, Yorkshire. She was refloated and resumed her voyage.

== 20 November ==
List of shipwrecks: 20 November 1878
Ship	State	Description
Ascupart	United Kingdom	The steamship ran aground on the Typet Ledge, off Atherfield, Isle of Wight. She was on a voyage from Odesa, Russia to Antwerp, Belgium. She was refloated with assistance from the Coastguard and resumed her voyage.
Christiane	United Kingdom	The schooner ran aground on the Haisborough Sands, in the North Sea off the coast of Norfolk. She was on a voyage from Poole, Dorset to Newcastle upon Tyne, Northumberland. She was refloated and taken in to Great Yarmouth in a leaky condition.
Guara	Brazil	The steamship collided with the steamship Cearense (United Kingdom) and sank at Pará. All on board survived.
Melanie	France	The ship was destroyed by fire at Bordeaux, Gironde with the loss of a crew member.
War Eagle	United Kingdom	The paddle tug sank at South Shields, County Durham.

== 21 November ==
List of shipwrecks: 21 November 1878
Ship	State	Description
Alice Davies	United Kingdom	The barque was run down and sunk in the River Mersey by the steamship Cherbourg (United Kingdom) with the loss of five of the fifteen people on board. Survivors were rescued by Cherbourg and the tugs Sailor King and Warrior (both United Kingdom). The wreck was dispersed by explosives in December.
Glenorchy	United Kingdom	The steamship was driven ashore in the River Thames. She was on a voyage from London to Singapore, Straits Settlements.
Gustav	Germany	The brig was driven ashore 6 nautical miles (11 km) north of Aberdeen, United Kingdom. She was on a voyage from Danzig to Antwerp, Belgium.
Thor	United Kingdom	The ship ran aground at Montrose, Forfarshire. She was on a voyage from Baltimore, Maryland, United States to Montrose. She was refloated and taken in to Montrose.

== 22 November ==
List of shipwrecks: 22 November 1878
Ship	State	Description
Caroline Knight	United States	The schooner stranded on Straw's Point, New Hampshire 1/4 nautical mile (0.46 km) east of Life Saving Station No. 7, 1st District in a strong wind. Her crew of five rescued by the United States Life Saving Service.
Clyde	United Kingdom	The ship departed from Liverpool, Lancashire for Seyðisfjörður, Iceland. No further trace, reported missing.
Northcote	United Kingdom	The steamship ran aground on the Lillegrunden, in the Baltic Sea. She was refloated on 24 November and taken in to Copenhagen, Denmark.
Partisan	Sweden	The brig was driven ashore and wrecked at "Raabea", Denmark. Her crew were rescued. She was on a voyage from Hartlepool, County Durham, United Kingdom to Malmö.
Western Eilan	Sweden	The barque was driven ashore at Beaufort, United States.
William H. Hopkins	United States	The schooner stranded on Long Island, New York 1/2 nautical mile (0.93 km) west of Life Saving Station No. 34, 3rd District in a strong wind. Her crew was rescued by the United States Life Saving Service.
Unnamed	Flag unknown	The steamship ran aground on Taylor's Bank, in Liverpool Bay.

== 23 November ==
List of shipwrecks: 23 November 1878
Ship	State	Description
Diana	Denmark	The ship was driven ashore and severely damaged at Tamsui, Formosa. She was refloated.
Ida B. Silsbee	United States	The schooner stranded on the Fire Island Bar in a gale and high seas where she pounded her bottom out. Her crew of three were rescued by the United States Life Saving Service.
Mary A. Rowland	United States	The schooner stranded on the rocks Rackliff Island, Maine in a gale and high seas. Refloated a week later and beached on flats. Her crew of three were rescued by the United States Life Saving Service.
Quebec	United Kingdom	The steamship ran aground in the River Mersey. She was refloated and resumed her voyage.
Riverdale	United States	The Schooner was run into and sunk off Thacher Island, Massachusetts. Her crew were rescued.

== 24 November ==
List of shipwrecks: 24 November 1878
Ship	State	Description
Dora	United Kingdom	The steamship struck rocks in the River Shannon and was damaged. She was on a voyage from Nicolaieff, Russia to Limerick. She completed her voyage in a severely leaky condition.
Louisa Jane	United Kingdom	The cutter struck rocks off Portishead, Somerset and sank. Her four crew survived. She was on a voyage from Roscoff, Finistère, France to Bristol, Gloucestershire.
Maggie Townsend	United Kingdom	The schooner collided with the steamship Tuller or Seniers (Flag unknown) and sank in the River Mersey.
Mercia	United Kingdom	The barque collided with the steamship Camoens (United Kingdom) and sank at São Vicente, Cape Verde Islands. Her crew were rescued. Mercia was on a voyage from Cardiff, Glamorgan to Banana, Congo Free State.
Parthenon	Greece	The steamship ran aground in the Danube 20 nautical miles (37 km) from its mouth.
Richmond	United Kingdom	The steamship sprang a leak and foundered off Cape Finisterre, Spain. All on board were rescued by the steamship Nellie Wise (United Kingdom).
Royal Standard	United Kingdom	The schooner collided with the barque Ezio (Austria-Hungary) approximately 7 nautical miles (13 km) north-east of Lundy Island, Devon with the loss of one of her five crew. Survivors were rescued by Ezio. Royal Standard was severely damaged. She was towed into Ilfracombe, Devon.
Sandsend	United Kingdom	The steamship ran aground at Hartlepool, County Durham. She was on a voyage from London to Hartlepool. She was refloated on 6 December and taken in to Hartlepool.
Scottish Maid	United Kingdom	The brigantine was run down and sunk off Whitby, Yorkshire by the brigantine Ann (United Kingdom). Her crew were rescued by Ann. Scottish Maid was on a voyage from Seaham, County Durham to Lowestoft, Suffolk.
Sophia	United Kingdom	The Thames barge was run down and sunk in the River Thames by the steamship Aberfeldy (United Kingdom).
Three unnamed vessels	Flags unknown	The ships sank in the Tagus with the loss of eighteen lives.

== 25 November ==
List of shipwrecks: 25 November 1878
Ship	State	Description
Ariel	United Kingdom	The schooner ran aground at Sunderland, County Durham. She was refloated.
Cassiopia	United Kingdom	The barque was wrecked at the mouth of the Llobregat. Her crew were rescued. She was on a voyage from Newcastle upon Tyne, Northumberland to Barcelona, Spain.
Constance	Netherlands	The barque was driven ashore on Texel, North Holland. Her crew were rescued. She was on a voyage from Kronstadt, Russia to Amsterdam, North Holland.
Dora	United Kingdom	The steamship struck rocks in the River Shannon and was severely damaged.
Henrietta	Flag unknown	The ship was driven ashore at Olinda, Brazil. She was on a voyage from Santa Catharina to Ceará, Brazil.
Moel Eilain, and Pommerania	Germany	The steamship Pommerania was in collision with the barque Moel Eilain (United Kingdom) and sank in the English Channel off Folkestone, Kent, United Kingdom with the loss of 48 of the 220 people on board. Survivors were rescued by the steamship Glengary (United Kingdom). Pommerania was on a voyage from New York, United States to Hamburg. Moel Eilian was on a voyage from Rotterdam, South Holland, Netherlands to Cardiff, Glamorgan. She put in to Dover, Kent in a severely damaged condition.

== 26 November ==
List of shipwrecks: 26 November 1878
Ship	State	Description
Carmela	United States	The ship was damaged by fire at Trieste.
Emmy	Germany	The schooner was wrecked on the Haisborough Sands, in the North Sea off the coast of Norfolk, United Kingdom. Her crew were rescued by the steamship Frederick Snowden (United Kingdom). Emmy was on a voyage from Ystad, Sweden to Great Yarmouth, Norfolk.
Fleetwing	United Kingdom	The ship was driven ashore at Audresselles, Pas-de-Calais, France.
Gem	United Kingdom	The Mersey Ferry collided with Bowfell (United Kingdom) and was severely damaged. Five people were killed, thirteen were reported missing.
Hertha	Norway	The brig was driven ashore and wrecked at Lyngør with the loss of two of her crew. She was on a voyage from Leith, Lothian, United Kingdom to Christiania.
Pallas	Sweden	The ship was driven ashore on Öland. She was refloated and resumed her voyage.
Zosteria	United Kingdom	The schooner was abandoned off Lowestoft, Suffolk. Her crew were rescued by the Lowestoft Lifeboat. She was on a voyage from Poole, Dorset to Middlesbrough, Yorkshire. Zosteria was subsequently taken in to Lowestoft.

== 27 November ==
List of shipwrecks: 27 November 1878
Ship	State	Description
George Fox	United Kingdom	The ship was driven ashore at Ambleteuse, Pas-de-Calais, France. She was on a voyage from Cowes, Isle of Wight to Sunderland, County Durham.
Klemore	United Kingdom	The steamship ran aground on the Aldeburgh Knapes Shoal, in the North Sea off Aldeburgh, Suffolk and was damaged. She was on a voyage from Newcastle upon Tyne, Northumberland to London. She was later refloated and taken into the River Thames, where she arrived on 14 December.
Magdalena	Denmark	The schooner was driven ashore on Læsø. She was on a voyage from Norrköping, Sweden to Dover, Kent, United Kingdom. She was refloated and resumed her voyage

== 28 November ==
List of shipwrecks: 28 November 1878
Ship	State	Description
Annie	Netherlands	The schooner ran aground and was wrecked on the Barrow Sand, in the Thames Estuary. Her crew were rescued. She was on a voyage from Saint Petersburg, Russia to London, United Kingdom.
Annie Vernon	United Kingdom	The steamship struck the pier at Sunderland, County Durham and was beached. She was on a voyage from London to Sunderland.
Constance Mary	United Kingdom	The ship ran aground at Villareal, Spain. She was on a voyage from Villareal to Plymouth, Devon. She was refloated with assistance.
Escape	United Kingdom	The schooner was driven ashore and wrecked at Middleton, County Durham. Her crew were rescued by the Hartlepool Lifeboat John Clay Barlow ( Royal National Lifeboat Institution). Escape was on a voyuage from Montrose, Forfarshire to London.
Jacob Rotheburg	Germany	The barque was driven ashore at South Shields, County Durham. All on board were rescued by rocket apparatus. She was refloated on 9 December.
Meaburn	United Kingdom	The schooner was driven ashore and severely damaged at West Hartlepool, County Durham.
Richard and George	United Kingdom	The schooner was severely damaged by fire in the River Tyne.
St. Mark	United Kingdom	The steamship ran aground on the Middle Sand, in the North Sea off the coast of Essex and was damaged. She was on a voyage from Stockton-on-Tees, County Durham to London. She was refloated and completed her voyage.
William Carroll	United States	The schooner stranded on North Island, Massachusetts in high surf.

== 29 November ==
List of shipwrecks: 29 November 1878
Ship	State	Description
Abeona	United Kingdom	The fishing lugger was driven ashore and wrecked at Great Yarmouth, Norfolk. Her crew were rescued.
Alfgar	United Kingdom	The steamship was driven ashore at Hammeren, Denmark. She was later refloated.
Charles and John	Sweden	The barque was wrecked on the Lemon and Ower Sand, in the North Sea with the loss of seven of her nine crew. Survivors were rescued by the barque Soli Deo Gloria (Germany). Charles and John was on a voyage from Gothenburg to Calais, France.
Charlotte	United Kingdom	The brigantine was run down and sunk in the Irish Sea by Sea Flower (United Kingdom).
Fanny	(Russian Empire) Grand Duchy of Finland	The barque was driven ashore at Calais. Her crew were rescued.
Giacomo	Italy	The brigantine ran aground on the Meloria Shoal, in the Mediterranean Sea and was wrecked. Her crew were rescued. She was on a voyage from Cardiff, Glamorgan, United Kingdom to Livorno.
Heinrich	Germany	The brig was driven ashore and wrecked on Vlieland, Friesland, Netherlands. A crew member was reported missing.
Marie Honore	France	The ship departed from Swansea, Glamorgan for Marseille, Bouches-du-Rhône. No further trace, posted missing.
Ostfolk	Netherlands	The schooner was driven ashore at Östergarn, Sweden. She was on a voyage from Reval, Russia to London, United Kingdom.
Prince Oscar	United Kingdom	The ship ran aground in the Karnaphuli River. She was refloated the next day.
Rosamond	United Kingdom	The smack was driven ashore at Cherbourg, Manche, France. She was on a voyage from Saint-Malo, Ille-et-Vilaine, France to Newcastle upon Tyne, Northumberland.
San Juan	United Kingdom	The ship was run into by a steamship near The Lizard, Cornwall with the loss of fifteen of her sixteen crew. The survivor was rescued by the steamship.
Southminster	United Kingdom	The 1,223-ton ship went aground and was holed on Kelp Reef, near Cape Campbell, New Zealand, in thick fog. Her passengers, crew and mail were saved.
Spray	United Kingdom	The steamship ran aground at Alloa, Clackmannanshire. She was on a voyage from Alloa to Pillau, Germany. She was refloated and resumed her voyage.
Sweet Home	Canada	The schooner lost her tow in heavy seas and hit a pier at Oswego, New York, then stranded 300 feet (91 m) east of the harbor where she went to pieces. Four crewmen jumped onto the pier when she hit it, a woman was left on board and was rescued by the United States Life Saving Service before the schooner broke up.
Taranaki	New Zealand	The passenger steamship was wrecked on Karewa Island near Tauranga in thick fog. All 107 passengers and crew safely made landfall.

== 30 November ==
List of shipwrecks: 30 November 1878
Ship	State	Description
Alne Holme	United Kingdom	The steamship ran aground in the Bokkegat, off the coast of Zeeland, Netherlands. She was on a voyage from Maryport, Cumberland to Rotterdam, South Holland, Netherlands.
Arragon	United Kingdom	The steamship collided with the steamship Lady Havelock (United Kingdom) and ran aground in the River Avon. Arragon was on a voyage from Bristol, Gloucestershire to New York, United States.
Thyria	Denmark	The brig ran aground at the entrance of the Nieuwe Waterweg and was wrecked. Her crew were rescued by a lifeboat. She was on a voyage from Vindava, Courland Governorate to Schiedam, South Holland.
Wilhelm	Germany	The steamship was driven ashore on Öland, Sweden. She was on a voyage from Copenhagen, Denmark to Reval, Russia. She was refloated on 2 December and taken in to Oskarshamn the next day.
Two unnamed vessels	United Kingdom	The fishing boats were driven ashore at Aberdeen. Their crews were rescued. One boat was severely damaged, the other was wrecked.

== Unknown date ==
List of shipwrecks: Unknown date in November 1878
Ship	State	Description
Albion	Canada	The barquentine was abandoned at sea before 16 November. She was on a voyage from Paspébiac, Quebec to Rio de Janeiro, Brazil.
Anna	Netherlands	The brigantine foundered after 25 November. She was on a voyage from Saint Petersburg, Russia to London, United Kingdom.
ARend	Netherlands	The ship ran aground on the Blauwe Slenk. She was on a voyage from Runcorn, Cheshire, United Kingdom to Harlingen, Friesland. She was refloated on 15 November and taken in to Harlingen.
Aura	United Kingdom	The ship was driven ashore at Gaspé, Quebec. Her crew were rescued. She was on a voyage from Brazil to Gaspé.
Becker	Germany	The schooner was wrecked on the Mexican coast. Her crew survived.
Brechin Castle	United Kingdom	The ship was damaged by fire at sea. She was on a voyage from Trinidad to Calcutta, India. She put in to São Vicente Island, Cape Verde Islands on 15 November.
Bride	United Kingdom	The steamship ran aground at Hayle, Cornwall. She was refloated on 29 November.
Chrysolite	United Kingdom	The ship foundered in the North Sea off Vlieland, Friesland, Netherlands before 12 November.
Comrade	United Kingdom	The ship was abandoned in the Atlantic Ocean. She was on a voyage from Halifax, Nova Scotia, Canada to Jamaica.
Crimea	United Kingdom	The ship was driven ashore and wrecked in the Gulf of Mexico with the loss of three of her crew.
Ella B.	United Kingdom	The ship was abandoned at sea before 20 November. She was on a voyage from Liverpool, Lancashire to Charlottetown, Prince Edward Island, Canada.
Eskbank	United Kingdom	The ship was driven ashore at "Diamond", New Zealand. She was on a voyage from Glasgow, Renfrewshire to Honolulu, Kingdom of Hawaii.
Farnley Hall	United Kingdom	The steamship was run into by the steamship Morna and sank in the River Thames at the entrance to the Surrey Docks.
Felixe	Norway	The ship was abandoned in the Atlantic Ocean before 28 November.
Freddie C. Evett	Canada	The schooner was abandoned in the Atlantic Ocean. She was discovered on 7 November off Tybee Island, Georgia, United States by a pilot boat, which put some of her crew aboard.
George E. Thatcher	United States	The ship foundered in the Atlantic Ocean before 15 November. Her crew were rescued. She was on a voyage from Boston, Massachusetts to Africa.
Gluck Auf	Germany	The ship foundered in the North Sea off the coast of Zeeland, Netherlands. She was on a voyage from London to Helsingør, Denmark.
Guglielmo Tomasino	Italy	The brig was abandoned in the Atlantic Ocean. Her crew were rescued. She was on a voyage from New York, United States to Beyrout, Ottoman Syria.
Il Tipo	Italy	The barque was wrecked on the coast of Haiti before 10 November.
J. E. Woodworth	Canada	The barque was destroyed by fire at sea before 23 November. Her crew were rescued.
Julio and Vicgtoria	Portugal	The schooner was abandoned in the Atlantic Ocean. Her crew were rescued. She was on a voyage from New Bedford, Massachusetts, United States to the Cape Verde Islands.
Kron Prinz Ernst August	United Kingdom	The schooner foundered in the North Sea. Her crew were rescued by the fishing smack Express (United Kingdom). Kron Prinz Ernst August was on a voyage from Hartlepool, County Durham, United Kingdom to Lübeck.
L. de V. Chipman	United Kingdom	The ship was driven ashore at Charlottetown. She was on a voyage from Cardiff, Glamorgan to Charlottetown.
Leon	Cape Colony	The cutter was wrecked at Port Nolloth.
Linwood	United Kingdom	The brig was driven ashore at Maryport, Cumberland. She was refloated with assistance on 23 November.
Luisita	Italy	The ship was abandoned at sea before 13 November. Her crew were rescued. She was on a voyage from San Domingo to Genoa.
Manilus	Flag unknown	The ship was driven ashore in Bulls Bay, South Carolina. She was on a voyage from Cárdenas, Cuba to New York.
Marie Becker	Germany	The schooner was wrecked on the coast of Mexico. Her crew survived.
Marie Sophie	Germany	The barque was beached at Salinas, Brazil.
Margaret	United Kingdom	The schooner was driven ashore and wrecked at Sizewell, Suffolk. Her crew were rescued.
Martha S. Harding	United Kingdom	The brig was driven ashore and wrecked at Easington, Yorkshire.
Moss Glen	Canada	The schooner was abandoned in the Atlantic Ocean before 4 November.
Nelson	United Kingdom	The brig was abandoned at sea.
Ollivier	Norway	The ship foundered in the North Sea off the coast of Yorkshire.
Paragon	United Kingdom	The brig was driven ashore at Tetney, Lincolnshire She was on a voyage from London to South Shields. County Durham. She was refloated on 26 November and taken in to Grimsby, Lincolnshire.
Peder Anker	Norway	The barque foundered in the Atlantic Ocean before 13 November. Her crew were rescued. She was on a voyage from New York, United States to Queenstown, County Cork, United Kingdom and/or Marseille, Bouches-du-Rhône, France.
Phoenician	United Kingdom	The steamship collided with Moravian (United Kingdom) at Cape La Roche in the Saint Lawrence River and was beached. Phoenicia was on a voyage from Quebec City, Canada to the Clyde.
Quito	United Kingdom	The steamship was driven ashore at Kertch, Russia before 13 November. She was on a voyage from Hull, Yorkshire to Taganrog, Russia. She was refloated.
Rachel	United Kingdom	The ship was wrecked at Villanova, near Lisbon, Portugal. She was on a voyage from Villanova to Cardiff.
Sarah	United Kingdom	The brig foundered in the North Sea. She was on a voyage from Villanova to Copenhagen, Denmark.
Sweet Home	United Kingdom	The ship was driven ashore at Brindisi, Italy. She was on a voyage from Newcastle upon Tyne, Northumberland to Brindisi. She was refloated.
The Little Minnie	Jamaica	The schooner capsized and sank with the loss of all but one of those on board. The survivor was rescued three days later by the steamship Warrior (United Kingdom). The Little Minnie was on a voyage from Jamaica to Colón, United States of Colombia.
Ulysse	France	The ship ran aground in the Torres Strait. She was on a voyage from New Zealand to Cape Town, Cape Colony. She was refloated and put in to Mauritius, where she arrived on 8 November.
Zeeland	United States	The steamship caught fire at sea. She put back to New York and the fire was extinguished.
