= Baring Head Lighthouse =

Lighthouse in New Zealand

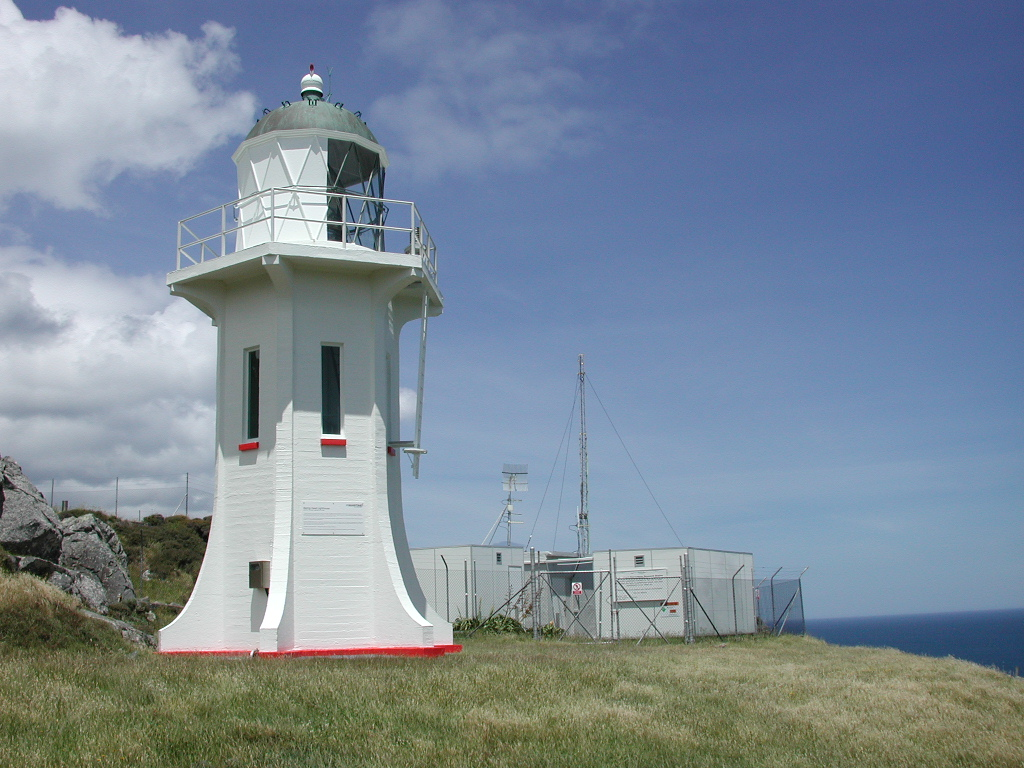
- Location: Baring Head, North Island; New Zealand
- Coordinates: 41°24′29″S 174°52′16″E

Tower
- Constructed: 1935
- Construction: concrete tower
- Automated: 1989
- Height: 12.2 metres (40 ft)
- Shape: octagonal tower with balcony and lantern
- Markings: white tower and lantern, greenish lantern dome
- Power source: solar power
- Operator: Maritime New Zealand

Light
- First lit: June 1935
- Focal height: 87 metres (285 ft)
- Range: 10 nautical miles (19 km; 12 mi)
- Characteristic: Oc W 15s

Baring Head Lighthouse is a concrete lighthouse at Baring Head in the Wellington Region of the North Island of New Zealand, with an LED beacon powered by mains electricity. It is owned and operated by Maritime New Zealand, and can be accessed via walking tracks in the southern area of the East Harbour Regional Park, south of Wainuiomata.

The lighthouse tower is 12.2 m tall (40 ft), but the hilltop elevation gives a focal height of 87 m (285 ft). The light range is 10 nautical miles (19 km; 12 mi).

The lighthouse was built to be the main approach light to Wellington Harbour, as well as a coastal light for Cook Strait. Lit on 18 June 1935, it replaced the light at Pencarrow Head, which was decommissioned later that year. The lighthouse was initially powered by a diesel generator but was converted to mains electricity in 1950. The 1000 W light was fully automated in 1989 and demanned. In February 2005, the original lens was replaced by a flashing LED beacon visible from up to 18 kilometres (10 nmi; 11 mi).

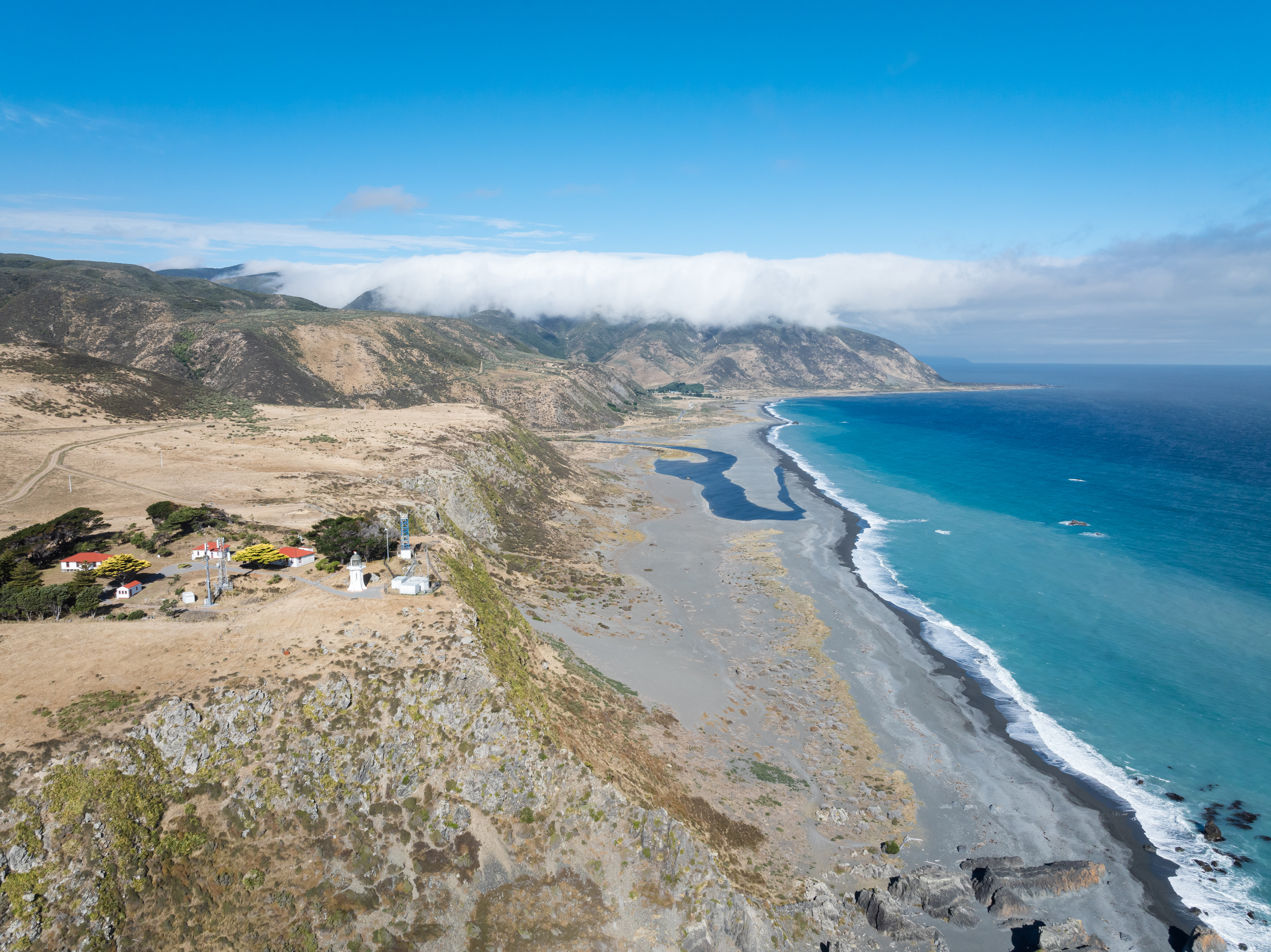
Aerial Baring Head Lighthouse

== See also ==
- List of lighthouses in New Zealand
