= Lake Kohangatera =

Lake in New Zealand

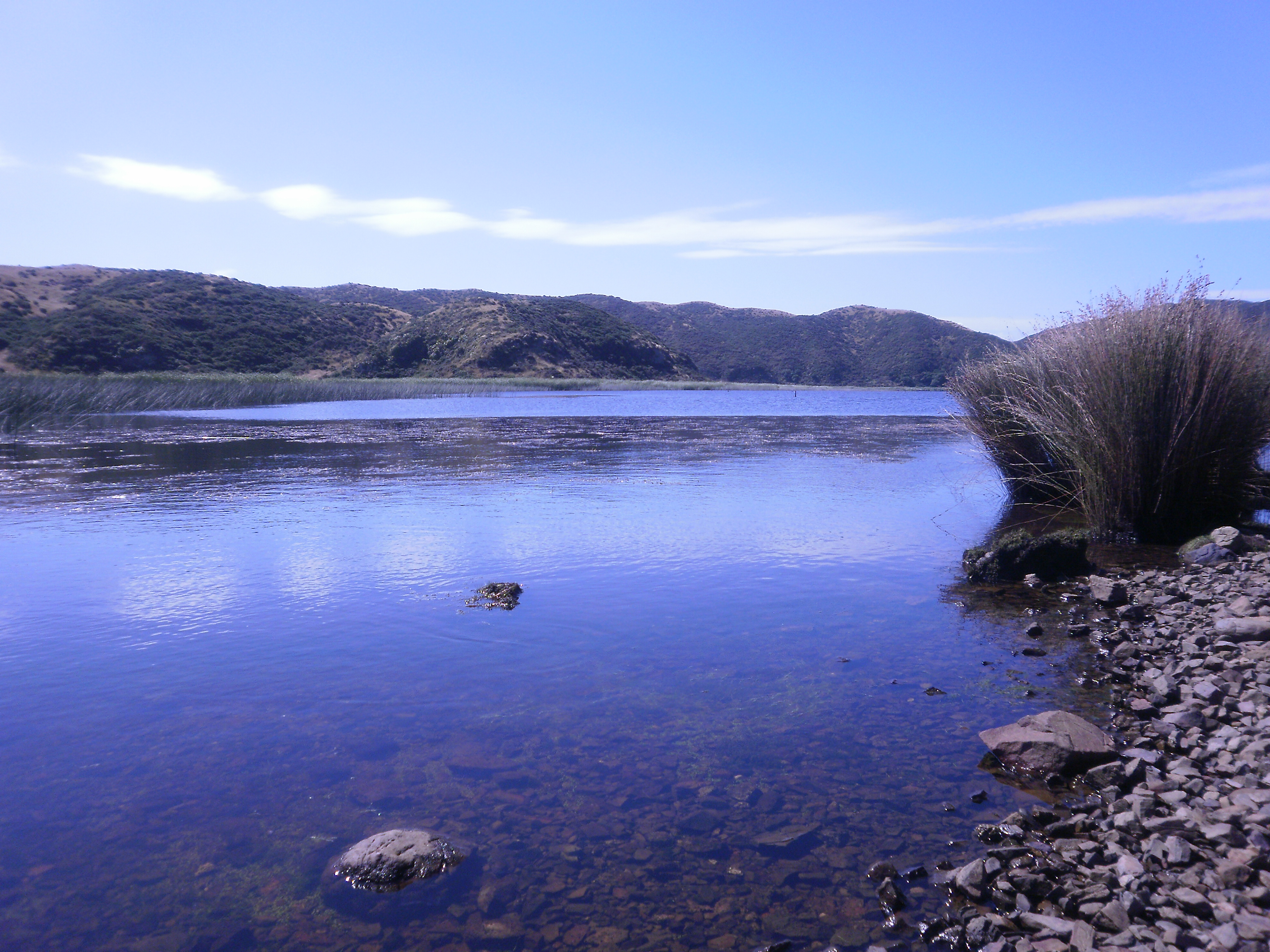
- Lake Kohangatera

- Location within New Zealand Wellington
- Interactive map of Lake Kohangatera
- Location: Wellington Harbour, North Island
- Coordinates: 41.3686°S 174.8668°E
- Primary inflows: Gollans Stream
- Catchment area: 17 km^{2} (6.6 sq mi)
- Basin countries: New Zealand
- Surface area: 17 ha (42 acres)

Lake Kohangatera is one of two lakes in Fitzroy Bay (to the east of Pencarrow Head, on the eastern side of New Zealand's Wellington Harbour). It has an open water area of 17 hectares and is fed by Gollans Stream, which has its headwaters on Mount Lowry, 14 km to the north. The drainage basin area is about 1,700 ha.

The lake's southern end extends close to the sea where it is dammed by the gravel and sand of old earthquake raised beaches. The lake itself is a protected wildlife reserve managed by DOC and no fishing is allowed there. It is also part of the East Harbour regional park (administered by the Wellington Regional Council). It has both significant historical and biological values; a large colony of black shags can be found on the northern edge of the lake and there is substantial archaeological evidence of a Māori fishing village existing there in pre-European times.
