= Francis Penty =

English and New Zealand architect

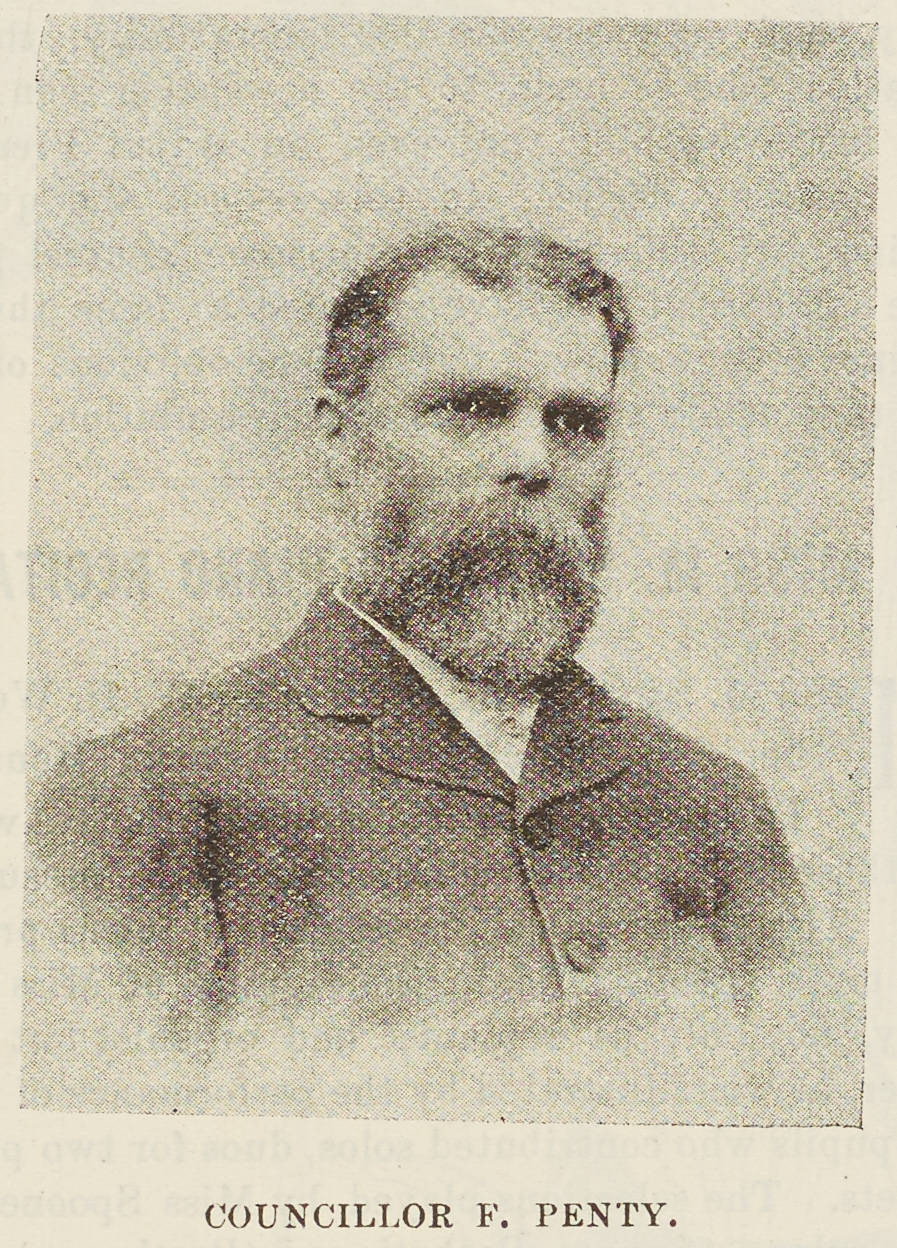
- Born: 1841; Naburn, Yorkshire, England
- Died: 1919 (aged 77–78); Island Bay, Wellington, New Zealand
- Occupation: Architect
- Years active: 1887–1919
- Partner(s): Leonard Joseph Forde, Edward Blake, Charles Lawrence
- Buildings: Hunter Building, Carrigafoyle
- Design: 'York'

Francis Penty (1841–1919) was an English and New Zealand architect. Penty initially worked in Yorkshire and elsewhere in England before immigrating to New Zealand. In New Zealand Penty formed several partnerships and designed over 200 buildings during his career, primarily in Wellington. Penty's most notable works are the Hunter Building and Carrigafoyle. Several of his buildings have registration with Heritage New Zealand and many are scheduled with the Wellington City Council.

== Early life ==
Francis Penty was born in 1841 in the village of Naburn, Yorkshire, England. Penty attended school in York and articled to an architect active in York and Halifax. Penty later worked as a draughtsman with Thomas Worthington.

== Architectural career ==
Scant information is available on Penty's English career but Penty is known to have worked as an architect for the Royal Engineers and later worked for the London & Northwestern Railway Company for 12 years.

In 1887 Penty came to New Zealand aboard the Kaikoura. Penty set up a private practice in Wellington and by 1905 had designed around 200 homes. Penty's first partnership was with Leonard Joseph Forde, lasting from 1893 to 1898, when Forde left New Zealand. Forde handled the Masterton branch focusing on the Wairarapa whilst Penty focused on Wellington. Penty entered a competition to design the Wellington Public Library but came in third place. Penty was suspended from the Wellington Association of Architects after criticising the prices of fellow members.

Penty formed a partnership with Edward Blake in July 1903. Penty and Blake's partnership produced over a hundred buildings. The pair also won the design for Victoria College (now Victoria University of Wellington), the Hunter Building, as it is now known, is registered as a category 1 building with Heritage New Zealand. Penty's partnership with Blake ended in 1909. Following the end of this partnership he entered one with Charles Lawrence. He remained in this partnership until his death in 1919.

Penty was a founding member of the New Zealand Institute of Architects but left in 1911 over a dispute on policies around pricing. Penty rejoined in 1913 after a solution had been agreed upon.

== Political Career ==
Penty served as a Wellington City Councillor from 1892 to 1895. Penty advocated for improving sanitation in the city during his time on the council owing to his background as a sanitation engineer.

== Personal life ==
Penty is believed to have arrived in New Zealand as a widower. In 1904 he married his second wife. Penty lived in Island Bay with his wife, in a house of his own design. Penty was president of the Victoria Bowling Club, member of the Yorkshire Society of New Zealand, and honorary member of the Wellington Rowing Club. Penty was a philanthropist with a notable donation being that of a contribution towards purchasing a lioness for the Newtown Park Zoo.

== List of works ==
Name	Date	Image	Note	Ref
24-26 Courtenay Place	1895		Scheduled with the Wellington City Council	
244 The Terrace	1898		Registered as a category 2 building with Heritage New Zealand	
Duke of Edinburgh Hotel	1898		Demolished in 1975	
89 Brougham Street	1890			
234 Oriental Parade	1900		Scheduled with the Wellington City Council	
34–42 Willis Street	1900		Demolished in 2011	
Preston's Building	1902		Registered as a category 2 building with Heritage New Zealand	
Hunter Building	1903		Registered as a category 1 building with Heritage New Zealand	
Carrigafoyle	1903		Registered as a category 1 building with Heritage New Zealand	
Shanghai Restaurant	1904		Registered as a category 2 building with Heritage New Zealand	
Townsend and Paul warehouse	1905		Scheduled with the Wellington City Council. Architect unknown but presumed to be Penty & Blake.	
8 Patrick Street ('Spiro')	1906		Registered as a category 2 building with Heritage New Zealand	
18 Patrick Street ('York')	1906		Registered as a category 2 building with Heritage New Zealand	
43 Adelaide Street ('Suburban')	1906		Registered as a category 2 building with Heritage New Zealand	
Wellington Bowling Club Pavillion	1906		Demolished	
Thistle Hall	1907		Registered with Heritage New Zealand as part of the Cuba Street Historic Area	
Murray, Roberts & Co. Building	1907		Scheduled with the Wellington City Council	
Pan Hellenic Association Building	1907		Scheduled with the Wellington City Council	
James Smith Building	1907		Building was substantially altered in 1932 to have an Art Deco facade. Registered as a category 2 building with Heritage New Zealand	
ANZ Bank building, Palmerston North	1912			
ANZ Bank building, Wairoa	1915			
Circa Theatre	1916		Scheduled with the Wellington City Council	
