= Dominion Museum building =

Historic building in Wellington, New Zealand

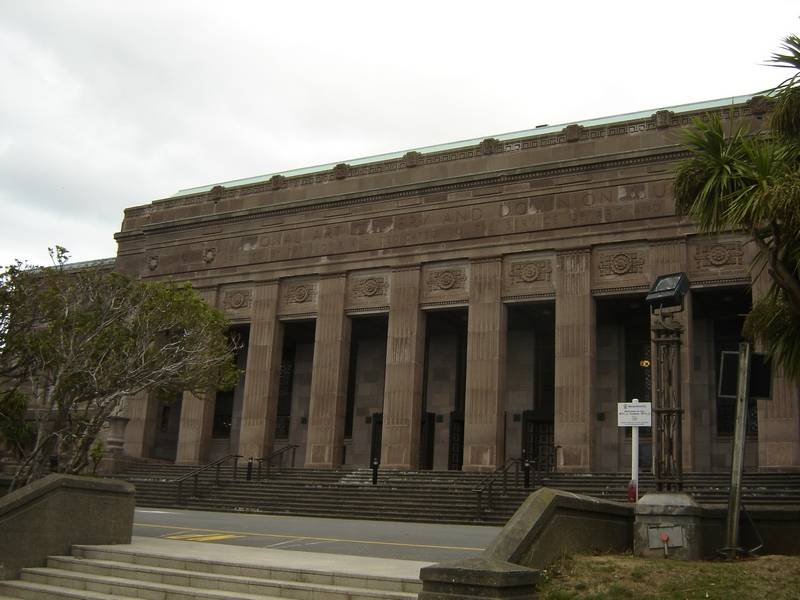
- The former Dominion Museum
- Interactive map of the Dominion Museum building area
- Former names: National Museum

General information
- Location: Buckle Street, Wellington, New Zealand
- Coordinates: 41.299538°S 174.776843°E
- Current tenants: Massey University
- Completed: 1936

Design and construction
- Architect: Gummer and Ford

Heritage New Zealand – Category 1
- Designated: 6 June 1990
- Reference no.: 1409

The Dominion Museum building on Mount Cook in Buckle Street Wellington completed in 1936 and superseded by Te Papa in 1998 was part of a war memorial complex including a Carillon (Note: Much of the 1914–1918 war was in parts of France and Belgium where there were carillons in many churches and towns) and National War Memorial.

It was designed and built to house New Zealand's national museum collection, the National Art Gallery of New Zealand and the New Zealand Academy of Fine Arts.

The building, registered by Heritage New Zealand as a Category 1 Historic Place, currently houses part of the Massey University Wellington Campus.

== History ==
=== Thorndon ===
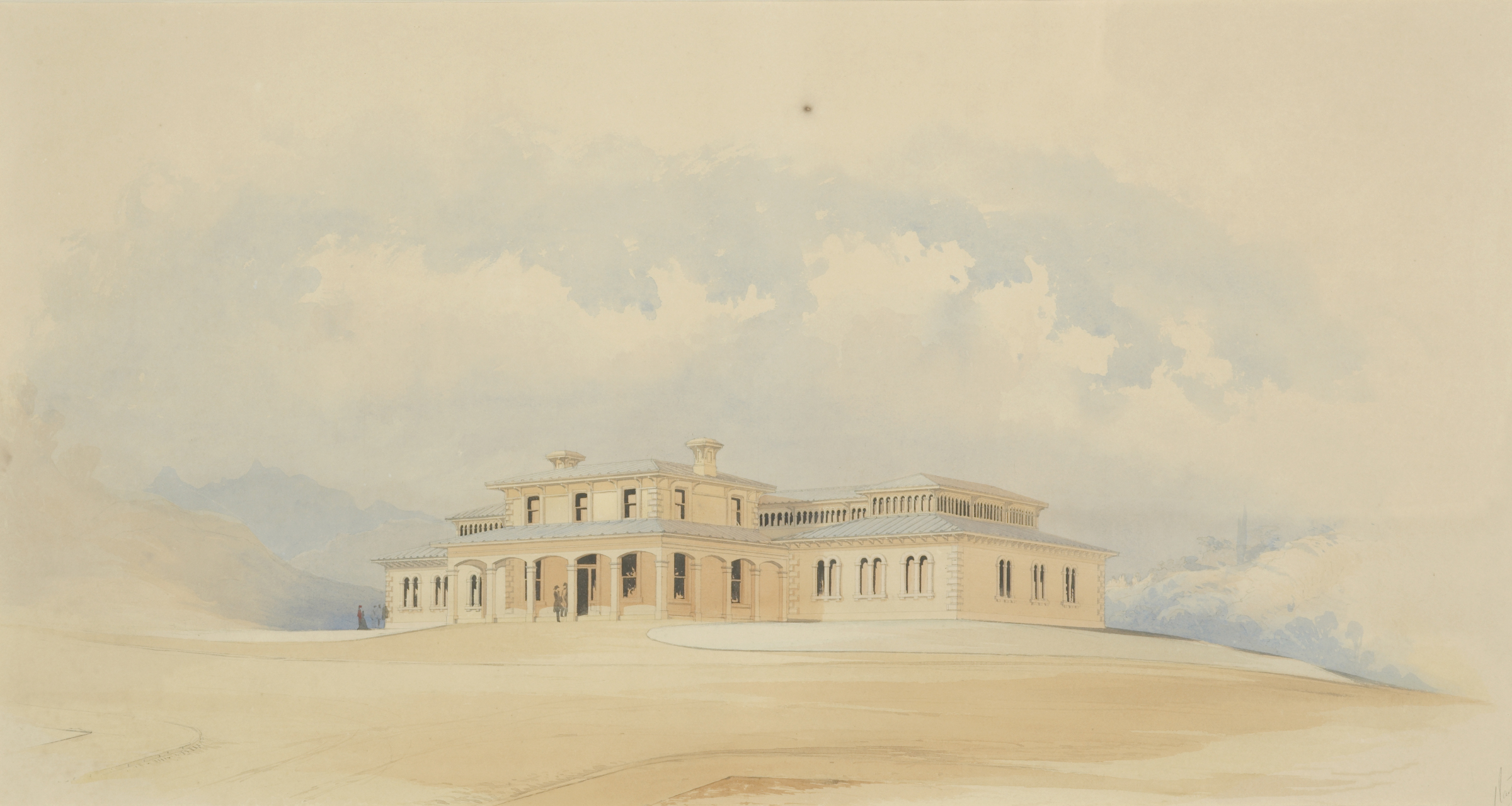
Colonial Museum 1865–1907, Dominion Museum 1908–1936. Museum Street, Thorndon now Pipitea. Prefabricated in Dunedin in 1865

Prior to 1936, the Dominion Museum collection was officially housed in a smaller wooden building in Museum Street behind the Parliament Buildings. Much of the collection was on offsite display or storage.

The Maori Collection including the Maori House originally built at Turanganui, Poverty Bay were housed in the Dominion Farmers' Institute from 1924 until the new Dominion Museum was ready to house them.

=== Mount Cook ===
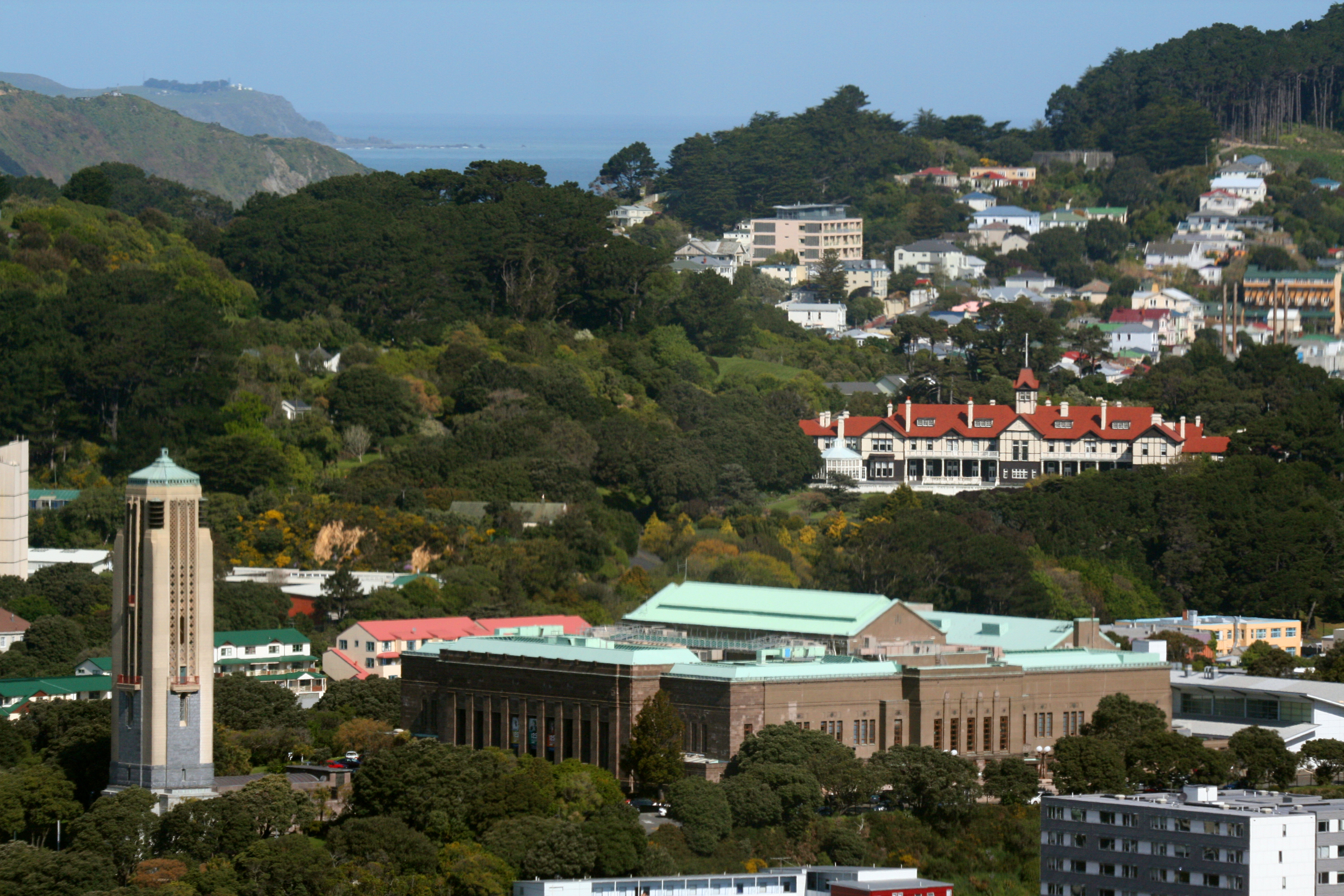
The museum on Mount Cook

In 1929 a fresh competition to design a new museum was announced, and 23 architects submitted designs.

The competition was won by Gummer and Ford from Auckland. In 1930, the National Art Gallery and Dominion Museum Act 1930 established a board of trustees to oversee development of the new building. The building housed the Dominion Museum, the National Art Gallery of New Zealand and the New Zealand Academy of Fine Arts (who had sold their land and donated the proceeds to the new organisation on the provision that they would be accommodated).

The museum is built of reinforced concrete and partly faced with Putaruru stone. Columns in the foyer are faced with Whangarei marble. The roof is steel-framed and clad with copper and glass. The museum was officially opened by the Governor-General on 1 August 1936.

In 1972, an act of Parliament changed the Dominion Museum's name to the National Museum.

In 1992 Museum of New Zealand Te Papa Tongarewa Act 1992 combined the National Museum and the National Art Gallery to form the Museum of New Zealand Te Papa Tongarewa.

The Dominion Museum building was featured in Peter Jackson's 1996 film The Frighteners, and in Peter Webber's 2012 film Emperor.

As of 2025, the building is owned by Massey University and the Wellington Tenths Trust, and is part of the University's Pukeahu Campus' educational facilities. The building is also leased by Massey University as a venue for events, such as conventions and live concerts.

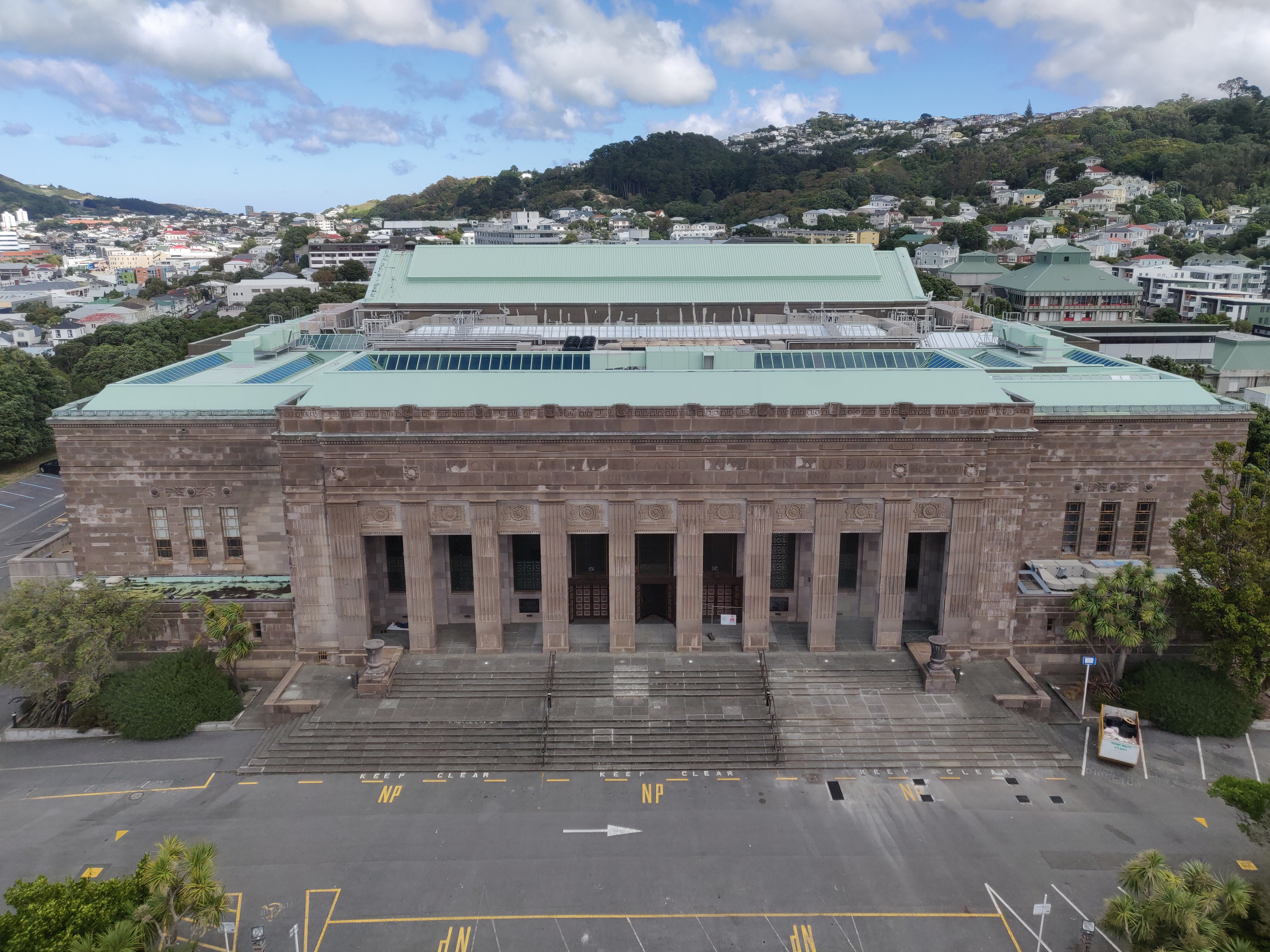
A view of the Dominion Museum building from the Carillon
