= Karori Crematorium =

Heritage building in Karori Cemetery, Wellington, New Zealand

Coordinates: 41°16′41″S 174°45′02″E

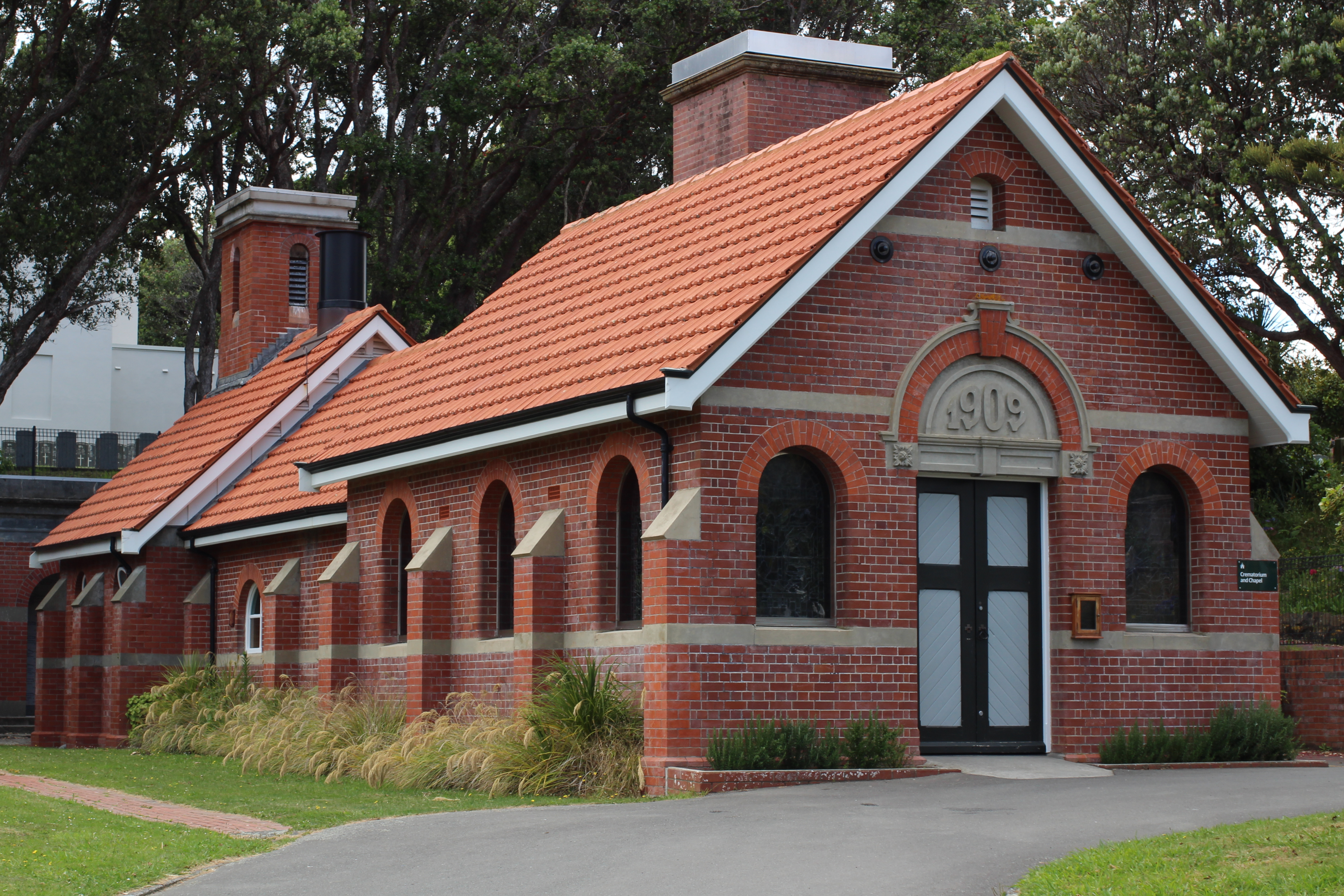
Karori Crematorium at Karori Cemetery in 2025

The Karori Crematorium and its adjacent chapel are located in Karori Cemetery in the Wellington suburb of Karori. The crematorium was the first such facility in New Zealand, and it opened in 1909.

The crematorium and chapel at Karori Cemetery were built after years of lobbying by various citizens. The brick building in the Edwardian-Romanesque style was the first crematorium in New Zealand, and as of 2026 is still in operation. The furnace chimney was designed to look like a short bell tower. The chapel seats about 24 to 32 people. The building is notable for six stained glass windows in the chapel. The windows were made from 1914 to 1939 by the Dublin, Ireland glass company An Túr Gloine ('Tower of Glass'), and are considered to be the most significant group of windows produced by that company in existence outside Eire and Northern Ireland. Heritage New Zealand considers the windows to be the most important set of twentieth century imported windows of their kind in New Zealand.

The Karori Crematorium and chapel are registered by the Heritage New Zealand as Category 1 Historic Places, with registration number 1399.

The Commonwealth War Graves Commission (CWGC) commemorate 36 New Zealand services personnel cremated here during World War II. They also erected a plaque commemorating 15 of them who were cremated at the crematorium and their ashes scattered. It is set into the Services Columbarium Wall in the Services section of Karori Cemetery.
