= Carrigafoyle, Wellington =

Historic building in Wellington, New Zealand

Carrigafoyle
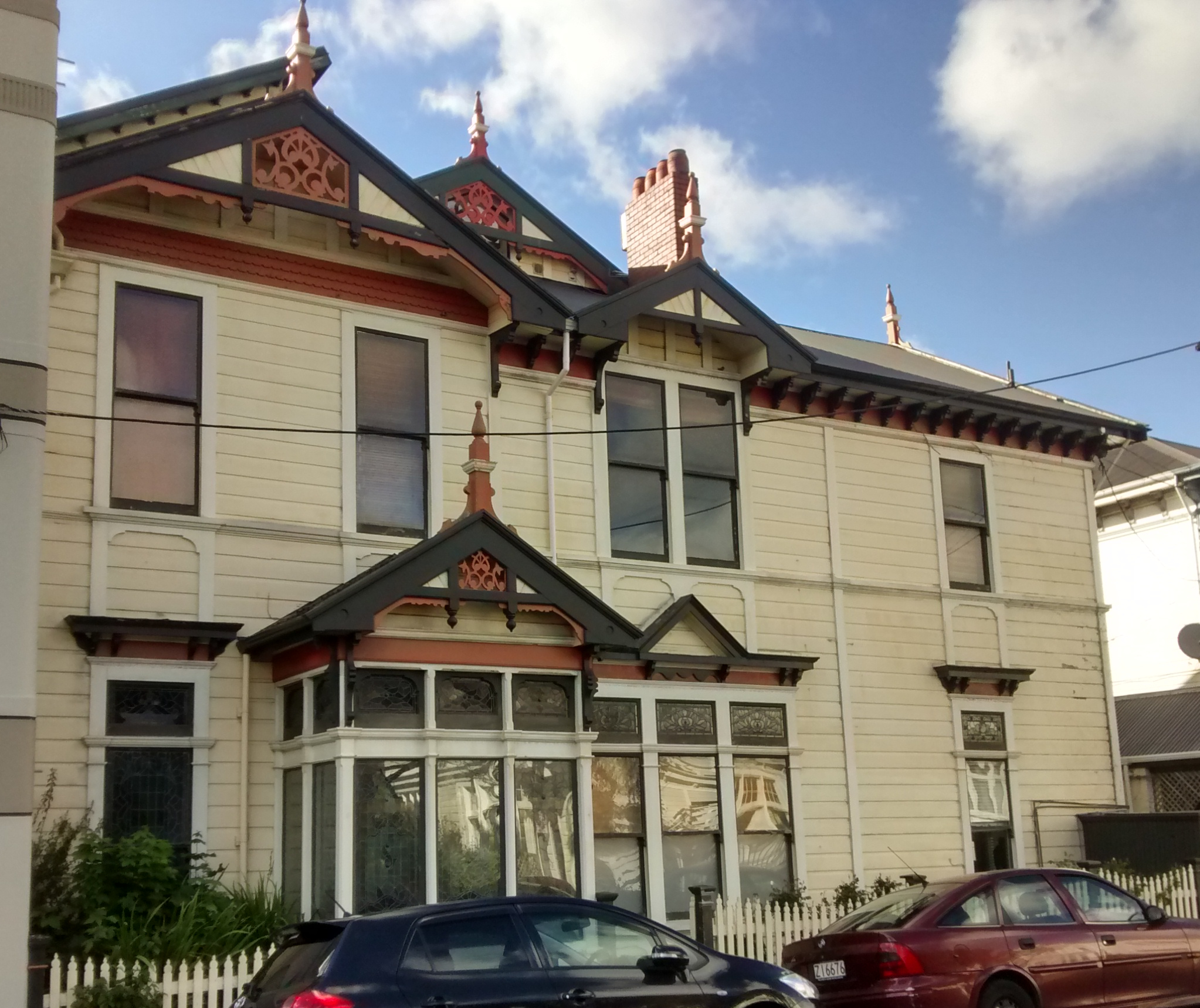
- Interactive map of the Carrigafoyle area

General information
- Architectural style: Edwardian
- Location: 195 The Terrace, Wellington, New Zealand
- Coordinates: 41.286897°S 174.773187°E
- Completed: 1903

Design and construction
- Architects: Penty & Blake
- Main contractor: W Fyfe

Heritage New Zealand – Category 1
- Designated: 11 July 1986
- Reference no.: 1345

Carrigafoyle (meaning "on a rock overlooking water") is a historic building in Wellington, New Zealand.

A stained glass window in the porch of Carrigafoyle

The house was designed by Penty & Blake for Robert and Elizabeth O'Connor. Robert's Irish ancestors were said to extend back to Carrigafoyle, County Kerry in Ireland. Elizabeth was a daughter of the Hon John Martin, after whom Martinborough is named. The house as designed had two main floors plus a basement and sub-basement facing the harbour. There were seven bedrooms and various living spaces. There was a 'principal staircase' for family and guests and a smaller staircase on the opposite side of the building for servants' use. The basement held the billiard room and a museum, which was a private project of the O'Connors' son Albert Creagh O'Connor. 'Spectacular' art nouveau stained glass windows were designed by Charles Edward Carter of Robert Martin Ltd.

After Elizabeth O'Connor died in 1919 the house was put up for sale. A real estate advertisement at that time said the house had 11 bedrooms, a dining room, morning room, drawing room, lounge hall, full-size billiard room, conservatory, telephone room, dark room and two balconies with "glorious" views of the harbour. It was brought by the Stevenson-Wright Family at this point who operated it as a boarding house until the 1970’s when it was sold. The building was restored in the 1980s by Rex Nicholls (a former city councillor). It is flanked by an art deco building bearing the same name.

The building is classified as a Category 1 Historic Place (places of "special or outstanding historical or cultural heritage significance or value") by Heritage New Zealand.

It is mentioned in the song 'Adelphi Apartments' by Tiny Ruins, New Zealand singer-songwriter Hollie Fullbrook.

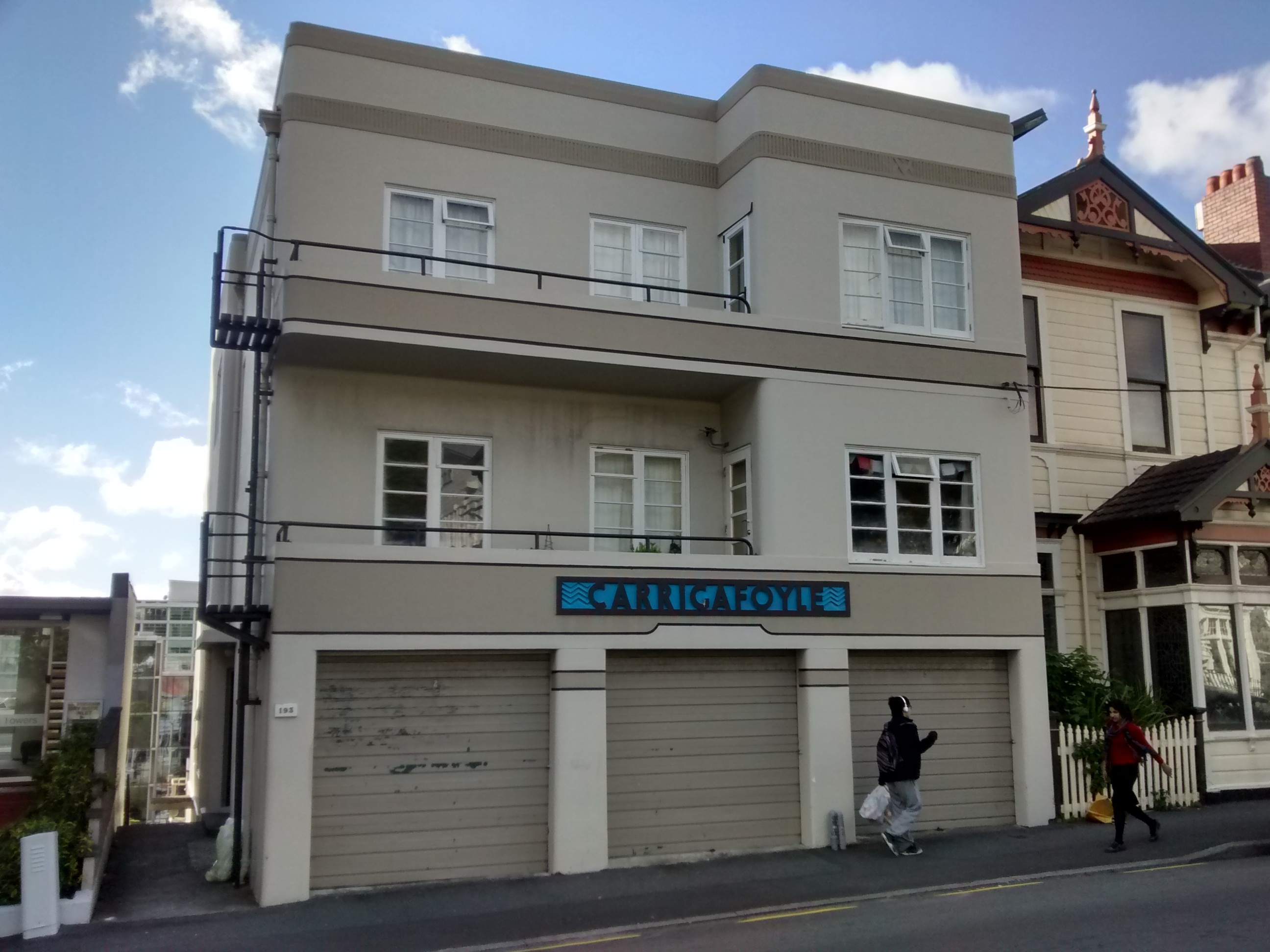
The new Carrigafoyle building adjacent to the old one. This is not heritage listed
