= AMP Society Building =

Historic building in Wellington, New Zealand

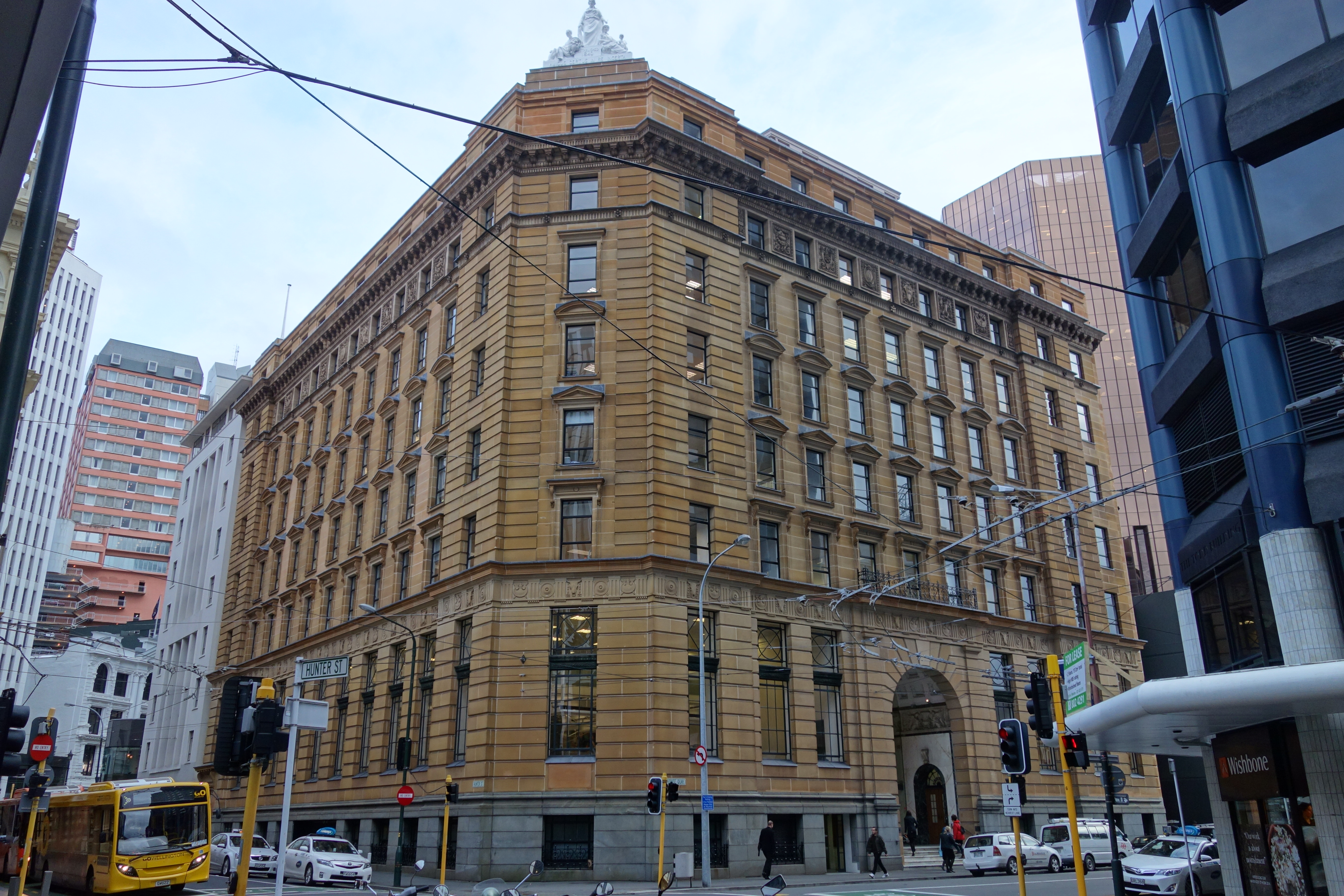
- Interactive map of the AMP Society Building area

General information
- Architectural style: Italian renaissance
- Location: 86–90 Customhouse Quay, Wellington, New Zealand
- Coordinates: 41.285401°S 174.776623°E
- Completed: 1928

Design and construction
- Architects: Clere & Clere (F de J and E H de J)
- Main contractor: Clere & Clere

Heritage New Zealand – Category 1
- Designated: 1-Sep-1983
- Reference no.: 209

The AMP Society Building is a historic building on Customhouse Quay, Wellington, New Zealand.

The Australian Mutual Provident society was founded in 1849 and established a branch on Featherston Street, Wellington in 1871. The AMP Society Building was built in 1928, and features a classical facade of grey New Zealand granite and sandstone from the Hawkesbury River in New South Wales.

The building is classified as a Category 1 Historic Place ("places of special or outstanding historical or cultural heritage significance or value") historic place by the New Zealand Historic Places Trust.

It is currently occupied by Verifone New Zealand and the Ministry of Justice.
