= The Dominion (Wellington) =

Newspaper published in Wellington, New Zealand

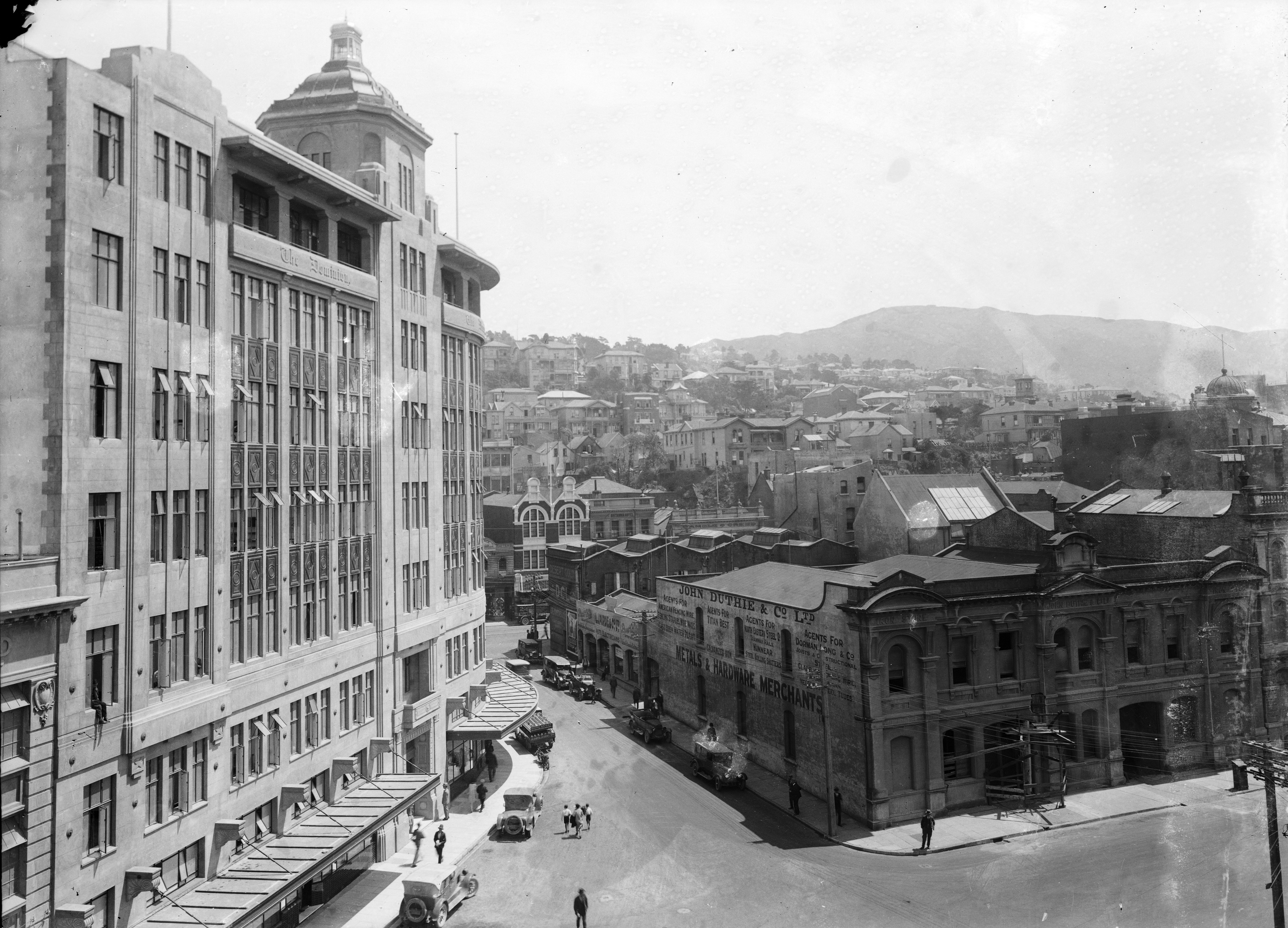
The Dominion Building on the junction of Wakefield, Victoria and Mercer Streets, Wellington, circa 1930

The Dominion (commonly referred to as The Dom) was a broadsheet metropolitan morning daily newspaper published in Wellington, New Zealand, from 1907 to 2002. It was first published on 26 September 1907, the day New Zealand achieved Dominion status. It merged with The Evening Post, Wellington's afternoon daily newspaper, to form The Dominion Post in 2002.

== History ==
=== 20th century ===
The Dominion was founded by Wellington Publishing Company Limited, a public listed company formed for the purpose twelve months earlier by a group of businessmen, rather than newspapermen, "in the Opposition and freehold interests". The existing Wellington morning newspaper The New Zealand Times had a Liberal Party heritage and the big pastoral landowners lacked a voice in the new dominion's capital and its hinterland provinces. Accordingly, The Dominion's circulation was always soundest outside Greater Wellington, where the long-established and politically neutral Evening Post always dominated. Early printing and special services delivered The Dominion the same day throughout the lower North Island. Wellington businessman John Duthie was one of the founding directors and was chairman of the board from 1912 until his death in 1915.

The Dominion promoted the conservative Reform Party and its policies. After twenty years it took over and closed its morning rival The New Zealand Times in 1927. The Dominion's ambitious new headquarters building in Mercer Street was completed in 1928.

Wellington Publishing Company's operations did not provide a good financial return on investment for its backers. In 1964, negotiations were under way with the Canadian–British Thomson Newspapers organization when a holidaying visitor casually picked up a copy and read of the proposal. Rupert Murdoch decided to make a bid, and Wellington Publishing Company became the first international investment by his growing newspaper empire.

=== Merger ===
In 1972 ownership was merged with that of its afternoon rival, The Evening Post, to achieve economies such as running the otherwise part-time new printing house of the Post in two shifts. The new holding company, initially intended to be Amalgamated Publishers, was named Independent Newspapers Limited (INL). The Dominion's headquarters building was soon dispensed with. The two newspapers kept their separate identities and rivalries until 2002, when they were merged to form a morning publication named The Dominion Post.

=== Fairfax/Stuff ownership ===
In 2003, INL divested itself of its publishing concerns to Fairfax Media, an Australian company. As of 2012, The Dominion Post was run from the old Post printing house site in Boulcott Street, and printed in Petone.

On 1 February 2018, Fairfax New Zealand Limited changed its name to Stuff Limited (named after its Stuff website, which launched in 2000). In December 2018, Fairfax Media merged with Australia's Nine Entertainment, which acquired its stable of New Zealand newspapers.

On 25 May 2020, Nine Entertainment sold its holdings, including The Dominion Post, to Stuff's CEO Sinead Boucher for NZ$1, with the transaction completed on 31 May 2024. This marked the return of the company to New Zealand ownership. In April 2023, the merged paper was renamed The Post.
