= List of historic places in Wellington =

List of heritage sites and buildings in Wellington, New Zealand

The List of historic places in Wellington contains the heritage sites and buildings from Wellington registered in the New Zealand Heritage List/Rārangi Kōrero (formerly the Register).

The New Zealand Heritage List is maintained and updated by Heritage New Zealand (aka Heritage New Zealand Pouhere Taonga, initially the National Historic Places Trust and, from 1963 to 2014, the New Zealand Historic Places Trust).

Name	List Type	Address	Number	Image
Pencarrow Head Lighthouse	Historic Place Category 1	Pencarrow Head	34	
St Mary of the Angels Church (Catholic)	Historic Place Category 1	17–27 Boulcott Street	36	
Government Buildings (Former)	Historic Place Category 1	55 Lambton Quay	37	
Old St Paul's Cathedral	Historic Place Category 1	34 Mulgrave Street, Thorndon	38	
Antrim House	Historic Place Category 1	63 Boulcott Street	208	
AMP Society Building	Historic Place Category 1	86–90 Customhouse Quay	209	
Ballance Statue	Historic Place Category 1	New Zealand Parliament Grounds, 1 Molesworth Street and 1 Museum Street, Pipitea	211	
Bank of New Zealand Building (No 1)	Historic Place Category 1	239–247 Lambton Quay	212	
Bank of New Zealand Building (No 3)	Historic Place Category 1	98–102 Customhouse Quay	213	
Cathedral of the Sacred Heart (Catholic)	Historic Place Category 1	40 Hill Street, Thorndon	214	
Cenotaph	Historic Place Category 1	Lambton Quay and Bowen Street	215	
Goldie's Brae	Historic Place Category 1	4 Goldies Brae, Wadestown	216	
Parliamentary Library	Historic Place Category 1	New Zealand Parliament Grounds, 1 Molesworth Street and 1 Museum Street, Pipitea	217	
Government House	Historic Place Category 1	Dufferin Street	218	
Old High Court	Historic Place Category 1	85 Lambton Quay, Pipitea	219	
House (Formerly Christian Science Sunday School)	Historic Place Category 1	22 The Terrace	220	
Hunter Building	Historic Place Category 1	Victoria University of Wellington, Kelburn Parade, Kelburn	221	
Massey Memorial	Historic Place Category 1	Point Halswell	222	
Parliament House	Historic Place Category 1	New Zealand Parliament Grounds, 1 Molesworth Street and 1 Museum Street, Pipitea	223	
Public Trust Office Building (Former)	Historic Place Category 1	131–135 Lambton Quay and 22 Stout Street	224	
Plimmer House	Historic Place Category 1	99 Boulcott Street	225	
St Gerard's Church	Historic Place Category 1	73–75 Hawker Street and Moeller Street and Oriental Terrace, Mt Victoria	226	
St Gerard's Monastery	Historic Place Category 1	73–75 Hawker Street and Moeller Street and Oriental Terrace, Mt Victoria	227	
St John's Church (Presbyterian)	Historic Place Category 1	166–176 Willis Street	228	
St Peter's Church (Anglican)	Historic Place Category 1	211 Willis Street and Ghuznee Street (State Highway 1)	229	
Seddon Statue	Historic Place Category 1	New Zealand Parliament Grounds, 1 Molesworth Street and 1 Museum Street, Pipitea	230	
State Insurance Office Building (Former)	Historic Place Category 1	137–143 Lambton Quay and Stout Street	231	
Turnbull House	Historic Place Category 1	25–27 Bowen Street Wellington Central – Pipitea	232	
Wellesley Club (Former)	Historic Place Category 1	2–8 Maginnity Street	233	
Wellington Harbour Board Head Office and Bond Store	Historic Place Category 1	2–3 Jervois Quay and Queens Wharf	234	
Wellington Harbour Board Shed 11	Historic Place Category 1	Customhouse Quay	235	
Wellington Harbour Board Shed 13	Historic Place Category 1	37 Customhouse Quay	236	
Wellington Harbour Board Shed 21	Historic Place Category 1	Waterloo Quay	237	
All Saints Church (Anglican and Methodist)	Historic Place Category 2	90 Hamilton Road, Moxham Avenue and Kupe Street, Hataitai	1331	
Anderson House (Former)	Historic Place Category 2	67 Hankey Street	1332	
Anscombe Flats	Historic Place Category 2	212 Oriental Parade	1333	
Dr Ewart's House and Surgery (Former)	Historic Place Category 2	279 Willis Street	1334	
Ashleigh Court	Historic Place Category 1	112–122 Riddiford Street and 1 Rintoul Street, Newtown	1335	
Bank of New Zealand Building (No. 2)	Historic Place Category 2	233 Lambton Quay	1336	
Bank of New Zealand (Te Aro Branch Building)	Historic Place Category 1	79–85 Manners Street	1338	
Basin Reserve Pavilion	Historic Place Category 2	Sussex Street, Basin Reserve	1339	
Braemar Flats (Former)	Historic Place Category 2	32 The Terrace	1341	
Red Cross Building (Former)	Historic Place Category 1	200 Willis Street and Ghuznee Street	1342	
Tram Shelter (Former)	Historic Place Category 2	Oriental Parade	1343	
Cambridge Establishment (Formerly Cambridge Hotel)	Historic Place Category 2	28 Cambridge Terrace	1344	
Carrigafoyle	Historic Place Category 1	195 The Terrace	1345	
CBA Building	Historic Place Category 2	328–330 Lambton Quay	1346	
Chevening Flats	Historic Place Category 2	90 Salamanca Road, Kelburn	1347	
Chew House	Historic Place Category 1	19 Ottawa Road, Ngaio	1348	
Children's' Dental Clinic	Historic Place Category 2	46 Frederick St	1350	
St Mary's Church (Anglican)	Historic Place Category 2	174–176 Karori Road and Fancourt Street, Karori	1351	
Departmental Building	Historic Place Category 2	15–21 Stout Street, and Ballance and Maginnity Streets	1356	
DIC Department Store Building	Historic Place Category 2	179–193 Lambton Quay	1357	
Dominion Building	Historic Place Category 2	35 Mercer Street, 76–80 Victoria Street and Bond Street	1358	
Dominion Farmers Institute Building (Former)	Historic Place Category 2	110–118 Featherston Street and 1, 3, 5 Maginnity Street and Ballance Street	1359	
First State House	Historic Place Category 1	12 Fife Lane, Miramar	1360	
Bishop's Court	Historic Place Category 2	32 Mulgrave Street, Thorndon	1361	
Shelter	Historic Place Category 2	76 Old Karori Road (Main Entrance), Karori	1362	
Crofton	Historic Place Category 1	21 Kenya Street, Ngaio	1363	
Franconia	Historic Place Category 2	136 The Terrace	1364	
Glendaruel	Historic Place Category 2	316 Karori Road, Karori	1365	
Holy Trinity Church (Anglican)	Historic Place Category 2	639 Ohariu Valley Road, Ohariu Valley	1367	
Homewood	Historic Place Category 1	50 Homewood Avenue, Karori	1368	
Homewood Croquet Pavilion/Summerhouse	Historic Place Category 1	50 Homewood Avenue, Karori	1369	
Hope Gibbons Building	Historic Place Category 2	7–11 Dixon St	1370	
Prime Minister's Residence	Historic Place Category 1	248-260A Tinakori Road, Thorndon	1371	
House	Historic Place Category 2	39 Pipitea Street, Thorndon	1372	
House	Historic Place Category 2	244 The Terrace	1373	
House	Historic Place Category 2	1/221 – 6/221 The Terrace	1374	
House	Historic Place Category 2	230 The Terrace	1375	
House	Historic Place Category 2	22 Burnell Avenue, Thorndon	1376	
Elliott House	Historic Place Category 1	43 Kent Terrace	1377	
House	Historic Place Category 2	32 Tinakori Road	1387	
House	Historic Place Category 2	21 Salamanca Road	1388	
Wilton Farmhouse and Outbuildings	Historic Place Category 2	116 Wilton Road, Wilton	1390	
House	Historic Place Category 2	46 Roxburgh Street, Mt Victoria	1391	
House	Historic Place Category 2	3 Seddon Terrace, Newtown	1392	
House	Historic Place Category 2	7 Seddon Terrace, Newtown	1393	
House	Historic Place Category 2	61 Coromandel Street, Newtown	1394	
House	Historic Place Category 2	63 Coromandel Street, Newtown	1395	
Inverleith Flats	Historic Place Category 2	1-6/306 Oriental Parade	1396	
Italian Ambassador's House	Historic Place Category 2	36 Grant Road, Thorndon	1397	
Inverlochy House	Historic Place Category 2	3 Inverlochy Place, Te Aro	1398	
Karori Crematorium and Chapel	Historic Place Category 1	Karori Cemetery, Old Karori Road, Karori	1399	
Karori Cemetery Lychgate	Historic Place Category 2	Old Karori Road, Karori	1400	
Kirkcaldie and Stains Department Store Façade	Historic Place Category 2	165–169 Lambton Quay	1402	
Commercial Building	Historic Place Category 2	1–4 and A-C/11 Courtenay Place	1403	
Somerled House	Historic Place Category 2	192 The Terrace	1404	
Ministerial Residence (Former)	Historic Place Category 2	41 Pipitea Street, Thorndon	1405	
MLC Building (Former)	Historic Place Category 1	231 Lambton Quay and 33 Hunter Street	1406	
Mt View Asylum Garden Wall	Historic Place Category 2	Government House Grounds, Dufferin Street	1407	
Mount Cook Police Station (Former)	Historic Place Category 1	13 Buckle Street and Tasman Street, Mt Cook	1408	
National Art Gallery and Dominion Museum (Former)	Historic Place Category 1	7 Buckle Street, Mt Cook	1409	
National War Memorial	Historic Place Category 1	Pukeahu National War Memorial Park, 19 Buckle Street	1410	
Orsini's Restaurant	Historic Place Category 2	201 Cuba Street	1412	
Our Lady Star of the Sea Convent Chapel (Catholic)	Historic Place Category 2	16 Fettes Crescent, Seatoun	1413	
Overseer's House	Historic Place Category 2	Wellington Botanic Garden, Kelburn	1414	
Pilot's Cottage (Former)	Historic Place Category 2	229 Marine Parade, Seatoun	1416	
Prudential Insurance Building	Historic Place Category 2	332–340 Lambton Quay	1417	
Puketiro	Historic Place Category 2	15 Cockayne Road, Khandallah	1418	
Queen Margaret College Tower Building	Historic Place Category 2	53 Hobson Street, Thorndon	1419	
House (Dr Henry Pollen's)	Historic Place Category 1	100 Willis Street and Boulcott Street	1420	
St Barnabas Church (Anglican)	Historic Place Category 2	15 Maida Vale Road, Roseneath	1421	
St George's Church Vicarage	Historic Place Category 2	40 Ferry Street, Seatoun	1422	
St James's Church (Presbyterian) (Former)	Historic Place Category 2	235–245 Adelaide Road, Newtown	1423	
St Mary's College Gabriel Hall	Historic Place Category 2	15 Guildford Terrace, Thorndon	1424	
St Joseph's Providence Porch, St Mary's College	Historic Place Category 2	15 Guildford Terrace, Thorndon	1425	
Scots College Aitken Building	Historic Place Category 2	1 Monorgan Road, Strathmore Park	1426	
Sexton's Cottage (Former)	Historic Place Category 1	26 Bolton Street	1427	
Shamrock Tavern (Former)	Historic Place Category 2	226, 228, 228A, 230 and 230A-C Tinakori Road	1428	
South British Insurance Building	Historic Place Category 2	326 Lambton Quay	1430	
Star Boating Club Building	Historic Place Category 1	Taranaki Street Wharf	1431	
Opera House	Historic Place Category 1	109–117 Manners Street	1432	
Stonehams Building	Historic Place Category 2	280–284 Lambton Quay	1433	
Taj Mahal Public Toilets (Former)	Historic Place Category 2	Cambridge Terrace and Kent Terrace	1434	
Australian Temperance and General Mutual Life; Assurance Society Limited Head Office (Former)	Historic Place Category 1	203–213 Lambton Quay and 22–32 Grey Street	1435	
Telephone Box	Historic Place Category 2	Post Office Square, Customhouse Quay and Jervois Quay	1436	
The Moorings	Historic Place Category 1	31 Glenbervie Terrace, Thorndon	1437	
The Wedge	Historic Place Category 1	20 Glenbervie Terrace, Thorndon	1438	
Thistle Inn	Historic Place Category 1	3 Mulgrave Street and Kate Sheppard Place, Thorndon	1439	
Thorndon Fire Station (Former)	Historic Place Category 2	1-4/12 Murphy Street, Thorndon	1440	
William Wakefield Memorial	Historic Place Category 1	Basin Reserve, Mt Cook	1441	
War Memorial	Historic Place Category 2	Makara Road and South Makara Road, Makara	1442	
Dransfield House (Former Wellington Arts Centre)	Historic Place Category 2	335 Willis Street	1443	
Nairn Street Cottage	Historic Place Category 1	68 Nairn Street and Macalpine Avenue	1444	
Wellington East Girls' College Main Building	Historic Place Category 1	Austin Street and Paterson Street, Mount Victoria	1445	
Wellington Harbour Board Wharf Office Building (Shed 7)	Historic Place Category 1	Jervois Quay	1446	
Wellington Harbour Board Wharf Gates and Railings	Historic Place Category 2	10 Waterloo Quay, Whitmore Street, Customhouse Quay,	1447	
Wellington Hotel	Historic Place Category 2	34 Molesworth Street and Kate Sheppard Place, Thorndon	1449	
Wellington Central Library (Former)	Historic Place Category 2	101 Wakefield Street, Civic Square	1451	
Wellington Railway Station	Historic Place Category 1	Bunny Street, Waterloo Quay and Featherston Street	1452	
Wellington Rowing Club Building	Historic Place Category 1	Taranaki Street Wharf	1453	
Whitcoulls Building	Historic Place Category 2	312–316 Lambton Quay	1455	
Stewart Dawson's Building	Historic Place Category 2	366 Lambton Quay and Willis Street, Stewart Dawsons Corner	1871	
Rita Angus Cottage	Historic Place Category 1	194a Sydney Street West, Thorndon	2291	
Apartment Building	Historic Place Category 2	300 Oriental Parade	2892	
Apartment Building	Historic Place Category 2	348–352 Oriental Pde	2893	
Oriental Parade Band Rotunda (Former)	Historic Place Category 2	245 Oriental Parade, Oriental Bay	2894	
Evans Bay Patent Slip (Former)	Historic Place Category 2	346 Evans Bay Parade, Evans Bay	2895	
House	Historic Place Category 2	294 Oriental Parade	2897	
House	Historic Place Category 2	492 Evans Bay Parade, Evans Bay	2900	
House	Historic Place Category 2	10 Balmoral Terrace, Newtown	2901	
House	Historic Place Category 2	146 Khandallah Road, Khandallah	2903	
Mansfield Court Hotel (Former)	Historic Place Category 2	277 Mansfield Street, Newtown 6021	2907	
St Patrick's Church (Catholic) (Former)	Historic Place Category 2	Makara Road, Makara	2911	
V.S.A. Building	Historic Place Category 2	31–35 Pipitea St	2912	
Halberstam House	Historic Place Category 2	117 Campbell Street, Karori	3186	
Wellington Town Hall	Historic Place Category 1	101 Wakefield Street	3275	
Kelburn Viaduct	Historic Place Category 2	Upland Road, Kelburn	3333	
St Andrew's on the Terrace	Historic Place Category 1	28–30 The Terrace	3571	
Commercial Building	Historic Place Category 2	107–109 Customhouse Quay	3595	
Carter Observatory	Historic Place Category 2	Upland Road, Kelburn	3596	
Newtown Community Centre	Historic Place Category 2	1, 7 Colombo Street and Rintoul Street, Newtown	3597	
House	Historic Place Category 2	38A Colombo Street, Newtown	3598	
Home of Compassion Creche (Former)	Historic Place Category 1	18 Buckle Street, Mt Cook	3599	
Karori Tunnel	Historic Place Category 2	Chaytor Street, Karori	3601	
Northland Tunnel	Historic Place Category 2	Northland Road, Northland	3602	
St Anne's Church (Anglican) (Former)	Historic Place Category 2	77 Northland Road, Northland	3603	
House	Historic Place Category 2	11 Farm Road, Northland	3604	
House	Historic Place Category 2	10 Farm Road, Northland	3605	
House	Historic Place Category 2	5 Farm Road, Northland	3606	
House	Historic Place Category 2	82 Creswick Terrace, Northland	3607	
Robin Hyde House	Historic Place Category 2	92 Northland Road, Northland	3608	
Waterloo Hotel	Historic Place Category 2	1 Bunny Street and 29–33 Waterloo Quay	3610	
Missions to Seamen Building (Former)	Historic Place Category 1	7 Stout Street and Whitmore Street	3611	
Druids Chambers	Historic Place Category 2	188 Lambton Quay and Woodward Street	3615	
Rainey Collins Building	Historic Place Category 2	97 The Terrace	3616	
Central Police Station (Former)	Historic Place Category 2	31–35 Waring Taylor Street and 32–40 Johnston Street	3617	
Government Life Insurance Head Office (Former)	Historic Place Category 2	50–64 Customhouse Quay, 9 Brandon Street, 2–6 Panama Street	3618	
City Meat Company Building (Former)	Historic Place Category 2	2–6 Willis St	3619	
United Fruit Company Building	Historic Place Category 2	360 Lambton Quay	3620	
Evening Post Building	Historic Place Category 2	82 Willis Street	3621	
Preston's Building	Historic Place Category 2	92–96 Willis Street	3622	
Hotel St George	Historic Place Category 2	124 Willis St	3624	
Commercial Building	Historic Place Category 2	243–245 Cuba Street	3625	
Railton Hotel	Historic Place Category 2	213 Cuba Street	3626	
Commercial/Retail Building	Historic Place Category 2	161–163 Cuba Street and 1–5 Swan Lane	3628	
Bristol Hotel	Historic Place Category 2	127–129 Cuba Street	3629	
Barber's Buildings	Historic Place Category 2	123–125 Cuba Street, Te Aro	3630	
Wellington Workingmens Club Building	Historic Place Category 2	107 Cuba Street	3631	
Farmers Building	Historic Place Category 2	96 Cuba Street and 167–171 Victoria Street	3632	
Albemarle Hotel	Historic Place Category 2	59 Ghuznee Street	3633	
National Bank Building (Te Aro Branch) (Former)	Historic Place Category 1	192–194 Cuba Street and Vivian Street (State Highway 1), Te Aro	3634	
Columbia Hotel	Historic Place Category 2	36–38 Cuba Street	3636	
St James Theatre	Historic Place Category 1	77–81 Courtenay Place	3639	
Shanghai Restaurant	Historic Place Category 2	120–126 Courtenay Place	3640	
Hooson's Building	Historic Place Category 2	55 Courtenay Place	3641	
Wellington Gas Company Building (Former)	Historic Place Category 2	58–64 Courtenay Place	3642	
Ford Motor Company Workshops	Historic Place Category 2	3–9 Ebor Street	3643	
Wellington Free Ambulance Building (Former)	Historic Place Category 1	5–9 Cable Street and Jervois Quay	3644	
Wellington Central Fire Station	Historic Place Category 2	38 Oriental Parade	3645	
House	Historic Place Category 2	62 Majoribanks Street, Mt Victoria	3647	
Friends Meeting House	Historic Place Category 2	7 Moncrieff St, Mt Victoria	3648	
Bus Tunnel	Historic Place Category 2	Pirie St, Mt Victoria	3649	
Seatoun Tunnel	Historic Place Category 2	Ferry Street and Broadway, Seatoun	3650	
Gazebo [Relocated]	Historic Place Category 2	Formerly 59 Falkirk Avenue, Seatoun	3651	
Courtenay Market	Historic Place Category 2	31–39 Courtenay Place, Te Aro	3652	
House	Historic Place Category 2	30 Roxburgh St, Mt Victoria	3655	
Cottage [Relocated]	Historic Place Category 2	7 Austin Street [Relocated to 19–21 Patterson Street], Mt Victoria	3662	
Queen Victoria Monument	Historic Place Category 2	Kent Terrace; Cambridge Terrace	3663	
Cottage [Relocated]	Historic Place Category 2	3 Tonks Avenue [Relocated to 7 Tonks Grove]	3664	
Cottage [Relocated]	Historic Place Category 2	1 Tonks Avenue [Relocated to 5 Tonks Grove]	3665	
Daisy Hill Farm House	Historic Place Category 1	15 Truscott Avenue, Johnsonville	4110	
House	Historic Place Category 2	34 Aro Street	4111	
House	Historic Place Category 2	36 Aro Street	4112	
House	Historic Place Category 2	40 Aro Street	4113	
House	Historic Place Category 2	39 Aro Street	4114	
House	Historic Place Category 2	42 Aro Street	4115	
House	Historic Place Category 2	43 Aro Street	4116	
House	Historic Place Category 2	44 Aro Street	4117	
House	Historic Place Category 2	46 Aro Street	4118	
House	Historic Place Category 2	125 Aro Street	4119	
House	Historic Place Category 2	205 Aro Street, Aro Valley	4120	
House	Historic Place Category 2	4 Entrance St, Taitville	4121	
House	Historic Place Category 2	1 Holloway Road, Mitchelltown	4122	
Mitchelltown World War One Memorial	Historic Place Category 2	Holloway Road, Aro Street and Raroa Road, Aro Valley	4123	
House (Former Shop)	Historic Place Category 2	17 Holloway Road, Mitchelltown	4124	
House	Historic Place Category 2	21 Holloway Road, Mitchelltown	4125	
Studio (Former Shop)	Historic Place Category 2	32A Holloway Road, Mitchelltown	4126	
House	Historic Place Category 2	33 Holloway Road, Mitchelltown	4127	
House	Historic Place Category 2	34 Holloway Road, Mitchelltown	4128	
House	Historic Place Category 2	37 Holloway Road, Mitchelltown	4129	
House (Former Shop)	Historic Place Category 2	41 Holloway Road, Mitchelltown	4130	
House	Historic Place Category 2	61 Holloway Road, Mitchelltown	4131	
House	Historic Place Category 2	77 Holloway Road, Mitchelltown	4132	
House	Historic Place Category 2	79 Holloway Road, Mitchelltown	4133	
House	Historic Place Category 2	83 Holloway Road, Mitchelltown	4134	
House	Historic Place Category 2	102 Holloway Road, Mitchelltown	4135	
House	Historic Place Category 2	123 Holloway Road, Mitchelltown	4136	
House	Historic Place Category 2	1 Norway Street, Taitville	4137	
House	Historic Place Category 2	8 Norway Street, Taitville	4138	
Powles House	Historic Place Category 1	34 Wesley Road	4139	
Paramount Theatre	Historic Place Category 2	25–29 Courtenay Place	4160	
Wesley Church	Historic Place Category 1	75 Taranaki Street	4422	
St Paul's Schoolroom (Former)	Historic Place Category 2	4–14 Turnbull Street, Thorndon School, Thorndon	4423	
Khandallah Automatic Telephone Exchange (Former)	Historic Place Category 1	86 Khandallah Road, Khandallah	4425	
Thorndon Brewery Tower (Former)	Historic Place Category 1	31–39 Murphy Street & 142–148 Molesworth Street, Thorndon	4426	
Truby King House (Former)	Historic Place Category 1	Manchester Terrace, Melrose	4427	
Katherine Mansfield Birthplace	Historic Place Category 1	25 Tinakori Road, Thorndon	4428	
Truby King Mausoleum	Historic Place Category 1	Manchester Terrace, Melrose	4430	
Karitane Products Society Building (Former)	Historic Place Category 1	28 Antico Street, Melrose	4431	
Dominion Observatory	Historic Place Category 1	Rawhiti Terrace, Kelburn	4700	
Spinks Cottage	Historic Place Category 1	129 Dixon Street	4704	
Firth House, Wellington College	Historic Place Category 2	21 Dufferin St	4957	
House	Historic Place Category 2	32 Aro Street	4958	
House	Historic Place Category 2	13 Farm Road, Northland	4965	
House	Historic Place Category 2	31 Holloway Road, Mitchelltown	4969	
Fort Ballance (including associated positions at Fort Gordon)	Historic Place Category 1	Point Gordon	5074	
Aida Konditorei	Historic Place Category 2	181 Cuba St	5341	
Silvio's	Historic Place Category 2	173 Cuba St	5343	
Selera Restaurant Building	Historic Place Category 2	151 Cuba St	5345	
Commercial Building	Historic Place Category 2	141–143 Cuba St	5346	
Turning Point	Historic Place Category 2	290 Cuba St	5347	
Commercial/Retail Building	Historic Place Category 2	288 Cuba St	5348	
Cottage and Commercial Building	Historic Place Category 2	282 Cuba Street	5349	
Commercial /Retail Building	Historic Place Category 2	276 Cuba St	5350	
Commercial/Retail Building [relocated]	Historic Place Category 2	274 Cuba Street [relocated to 268 Cuba Street]	5351	
Norml Tattoo Studio [relocated]	Historic Place Category 2	272 Cuba Street [Relocated to 274 Cuba Street]	5352	
Commercial/Retail Building [Relocated]	Historic Place Category 2	289–291 Cuba Street [Relocated to 270–272 Cuba Street]	5353	
Commercial/Retail Building	Historic Place Category 2	297 Cuba St	5354	
Commercial/Retail Building	Historic Place Category 2	301 Cuba St	5355	
The VIC (Lotus Restaurant Building)	Historic Place Category 2	154–156 Cuba St	5356	
Commercial Building (Artech Studios)	Historic Place Category 2	216 Cuba St	5357	
People's Palace	Historic Place Category 2	203–205 Cuba St	5359	
Morgan's Buildings	Historic Place Category 2	197–199 Cuba Street and 149–151 Vivian Street (State Highway 1), Te Aro	5360	
Hallenstein Brothers Building (Former)	Historic Place Category 2	132 Cuba Street and 55 Ghuznee Street (State Highway 1), Te Aro	5361	
Commercial/Retail Building	Historic Place Category 2	191–195 Cuba St	5362	
Berry & Co. Photographers Building	Historic Place Category 2	145–149 Cuba Street	5363	
Commercial/Retail Building	Historic Place Category 2	253 Cuba St	5364	
Maguires Building	Historic Place Category 2	168–174 Cuba St	5365	
L.T. Watkins Building	Historic Place Category 2	176–182 Cuba Street	5366	
Lampard Flats	Historic Place Category 2	284–286 Cuba St	5367	
Commercial Building (Sala Thai Restaurant)	Historic Place Category 2	134 Cuba St	5368	
Cable Car Winding House	Historic Place Category 2	Botanic Gardens, Kelburn	5372	
Ewart Hospital Nurses' Home (Former)	Historic Place Category 2	2 Coromandel Street, Newtown	5375	
Fever Hospital (Former)	Historic Place Category 2	140 Alexandra Road, Newtown	5376	
Kennedy Buildings	Historic Place Category 2	33–39 Cuba St	5377	
Last Footwear Company	Historic Place Category 2	41–43 Cuba St	5378	
James Smith Ltd. Department Store (Former)	Historic Place Category 2	49–65 Cuba Street, 93–97 Manners Street and Pringle Avenue, Te Aro	5379	
T.G. Macarthy Trust Building	Historic Place Category 2	58–60 Cuba St	5380	
House	Historic Place Category 2	164 Tasman Street	5424	
St Matthias' Church (Anglican)	Historic Place Category 2	379 Makara Road, Makara	5483	
Te Ika-a-maru Pā	Historic Place Category 2		6045	
Pā	Historic Place Category 2		6046	
Pits/ Midden	Historic Place Category 2		6047	
Midden	Historic Place Category 2		6048	
Midden/ Made Soil	Historic Place Category 2		6049	
Terraces	Historic Place Category 2		6050	
Midden	Historic Place Category 2		6051	
Terraces	Historic Place Category 2		6052	
Terraces	Historic Place Category 2		6053	
Makara Pā	Historic Place Category 2		6143	
Rangitatau	Historic Place Category 2	Moa Point Road, Tarakena Bay	6158	
Dominion Observatory Historic Area	Historic Area	North Terrace, Upland Road, Rawhiti Terrace, Salamanca Road, Kelburn	7033	
Footscray Avenue Historic Area	Historic Area	2, 4, 6, 8 Footscray Avenue	7034	
Government Centre Historic Area	Historic Area	Molesworth Street, Bowen Street, Lambton Quay, Stout Street, Ballance Street, Maginnity Street and Featherston Street	7035	
Oriental Parade Historic Area	Historic Area	Oriental Parade	7039	
Truby King Historic Area	Historic Area	Manchester Street, Melrose	7040	
South Lambton Quay Historic Area	Historic Area	Lambton Quay	7041	
Star of the Sea Historic Area	Historic Area	16 Fettes Crescent, Seatoun	7042	
House	Historic Place Category 2	207 Aro Street, Aro Valley	7082	
House	Historic Place Category 2	41 Aro Street	7083	
House	Historic Place Category 2	45 Aro Street	7084	
Commercial Building	Historic Place Category 2	134 Willis Street	7200	
House	Historic Place Category 2	127 Aro Street	7203	
Cuba Street Historic Area	Historic Area	Cuba Street	7209	
Kaiwharawhara Magazine	Historic Place Category 2	Ngaio Gorge, Ngaio	7215	
Randell Cottage	Historic Place Category 2	14 St Mary Street, Thorndon	7281	
Dixon Street Flats	Historic Place Category 1	134 Dixon Street	7395	
Old Coach Road	Historic Place Category 1	Old Coach Road, Johnsonville	7396	
Shed 22	Historic Place Category 2	Cable St/Taranaki St	7417	
Odlins Building	Historic Place Category 1	11 Cable Street	7418	
Post and Telegraph Building	Historic Place Category 2	Herd Street	7419	
Berhampore Flats	Historic Place Category 1	493–507 Adelaide Road, Berhampore	7432	
Basin Reserve Historic Area	Historic Area	Sussex Street, Buckle Street, Ellice Street, Dufferin Street, Rugby Street	7441	
Futuna Chapel	Historic Place Category 1	62 Friend Street, Karori	7446	
Lang House	Historic Place Category 1	81 Hatton Street, Karori	7447	
Hirschfeld House	Historic Place Category 1	49 Waiapu Road, Kelburn	7478	
Embassy Theatre	Historic Place Category 1	9-11 Kent Terrace and 2–4 Majoribanks Street, Mt Victoria	7500	
Red Rocks Baches	Historic Area	Wellington South Coast	7509	
Mestanes Bay Baches	Historic Area	Wellington South Coast	7510	
General Headquarters Building (Former)	Historic Place Category 2	213–215 Taranaki Street and Buckle Street, Mt Cook	7518	
Kau Point Battery	Historic Place Category 1	Kau Point, Miramar Peninsula	7542	
Wrights Hill Fortress	Historic Place Category 1	Wrights Hill Road, Karori	7543	
Fort Buckley (R.M.L.) Rifle Muzzle Loading Fortification	Historic Place Category 1	166 Barnard Street, Wadestown	7544	
John Street Doctors (Child Cancer Foundation House)	Historic Place Category 1	27 Riddiford Street, Newtown	7570	
Wellington Botanic Garden	Historic Area	101 Glenmore Street, Thorndon	7573	
Sydney Street Substation (Former)	Historic Place Category 2	19 Kate Sheppard Place, Thorndon	7577	
Wright Street Houses Historic Area	Historic Area	56, 58, 60, 62, 64 Wright Street, Mt Cook	7630	
Kahn House	Historic Place Category 1	53 Trelissick Crescent, Ngaio	7633	
Lilburn House	Historic Place Category 1	22 Ascot Street, Thorndon	7645	
Tapu te Ranga	Wahi Tapu	Island Bay	7654	
Massey House	Historic Place Category 1	126–134 Lambton Quay and 45–55 The Terrace	7661	
Alington House	Historic Place Category 1	60–62 Homewood Crescent, Karori	7698	
Upper Karori Dam	Historic Place Category 2	Waiapu Road, Karori	7749	
Lower Karori Dam	Historic Place Category 1	Waiapu Road, Karori	7750	
Tasman Street Wall	Historic Place Category 2	Tasman Street, Mt Cook	7758	
Toenga o Te Aro (remains of Te Aro Pa)	Historic Place Category 1	39–43 Taranaki Street, CBD	7771	
Erskine College (Former)	Historic Place Category 1	25–31 Avon Street, Melbourne Road and Mace Street, Island Bay	7795	
Eastbourne Ferry Terminal Building (Former) and Ferry Wharf	Historic Place Category 2	Waterloo Quay; Kumototo Laneway	7807	
Thomas King Observatory	Historic Place Category 2	36A Salamanca Road, Kelburn	9024	
Albion Gold Mining Company Battery and Mine Remains	Historic Place Category 2	South Makara Road, Black Gully, Terawhiti Station, Makara	9032	
Freyberg Pool	Historic Place Category 1	139 Oriental Parade, Oriental Bay	9440	
Wellington Trades Hall	Historic Place Category 1	124–128 Vivian Street, Te Aro 6011	9618	
Executive Wing (the Beehive)	Historic Place Category 1	New Zealand Parliament Grounds, 40 Bowen Street, 1 Molesworth Street and 1 Museum Street, Pipitea	9629	
Rangitatau	Wahi Tapu Area	Moa Point Road, Tarakena Bay	9648	
Athfield House and Office	Historic Place Category 1	99A, 105-107A Amritsar Street; 3 Onslow Road, Khandallah	9662	
Chinese Mission Hall	Historic Place Category 2	244–256 Willis Street	9739	
Wellington Central Library	Historic Place Category 1	65 Victoria Street Central	9761	
Cooper's Cottage	Historic Place Category 2	30 Ascot Street, Thorndon	9764	
McLean Flats and Gordon Wilson Flats	Historic Place Category 1	320A and 320 The Terrace, Te Aro	9783	
Wellington Teachers' Training College (Former)	Historic Place Category 1	26–40 Donald Street, Karori	9797	
Hurston	Historic Place Category 2	1 Mersey Street and Melbourne Road, Island Bay	9954	
Hannah Playhouse	Historic Place Category 1	2 Cambridge Terrace, Te Aro	9983	

== See also ==
- Category:Lists of historic places in New Zealand

== Bibliography ==
- Heritage New Zealand, New Zealand Heritage List
