= Chew Cottage =

Historic building in Wellington, New Zealand

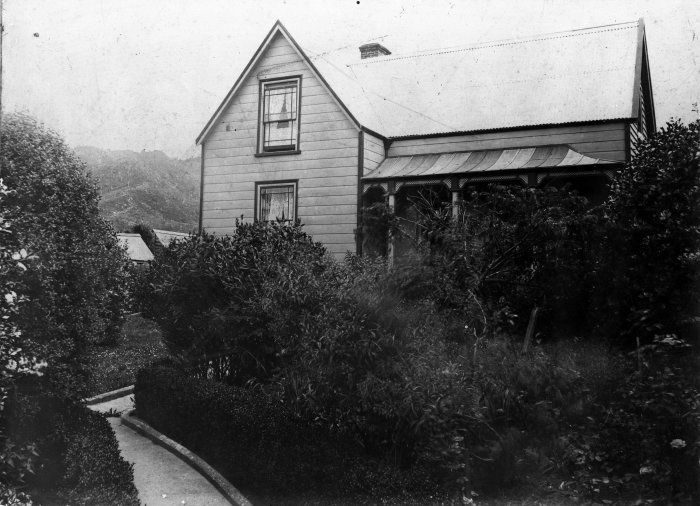
- Interactive map of the Chew Cottage area

General information
- Location: 19 Ottawa Road, Ngaio, Wellington, New Zealand
- Coordinates: 41.249105°S 174.774091°E
- Completed: 1865

Heritage New Zealand – Category 1
- Designated: 27-Jul-1988
- Reference no.: 1348

Chew Cottage is an historic building in Wellington, New Zealand.

The house, originally named "Millwood", was built in 1865 for John and Ester Chew. The cottage is one of Wellington's remaining houses from the 1860s. It resembles a traditional English stone cottage adapted for timber construction.

The building, is classified as a Category 1 Historic Place (places of "special or outstanding historical or cultural heritage significance or value") by Heritage New Zealand.
