= Dominion Building, Wellington =

Historic building in Wellington, New Zealand

Dominion Building
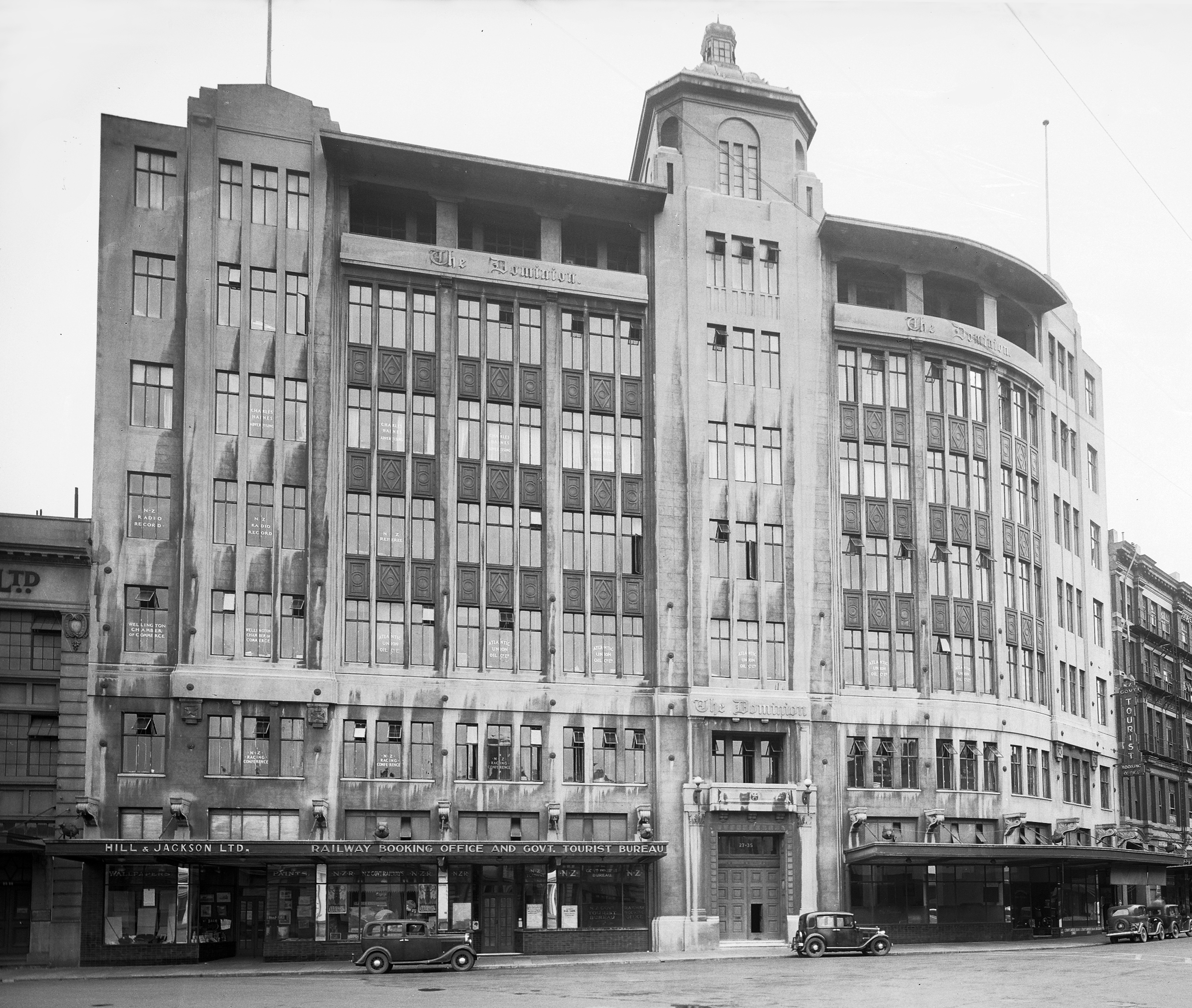
- The Dominion Building, c. 1940
- Interactive map of the Dominion Building area

General information
- Location: 27-35 Mercer Street, Wellington, New Zealand
- Coordinates: 41.2887°S 174.7758°E
- Completed: 1928

Design and construction
- Architects: Crichton, McKay and Haughton

Heritage New Zealand – Category 2
- Designated: 10 September 1981
- Reference no.: 1358

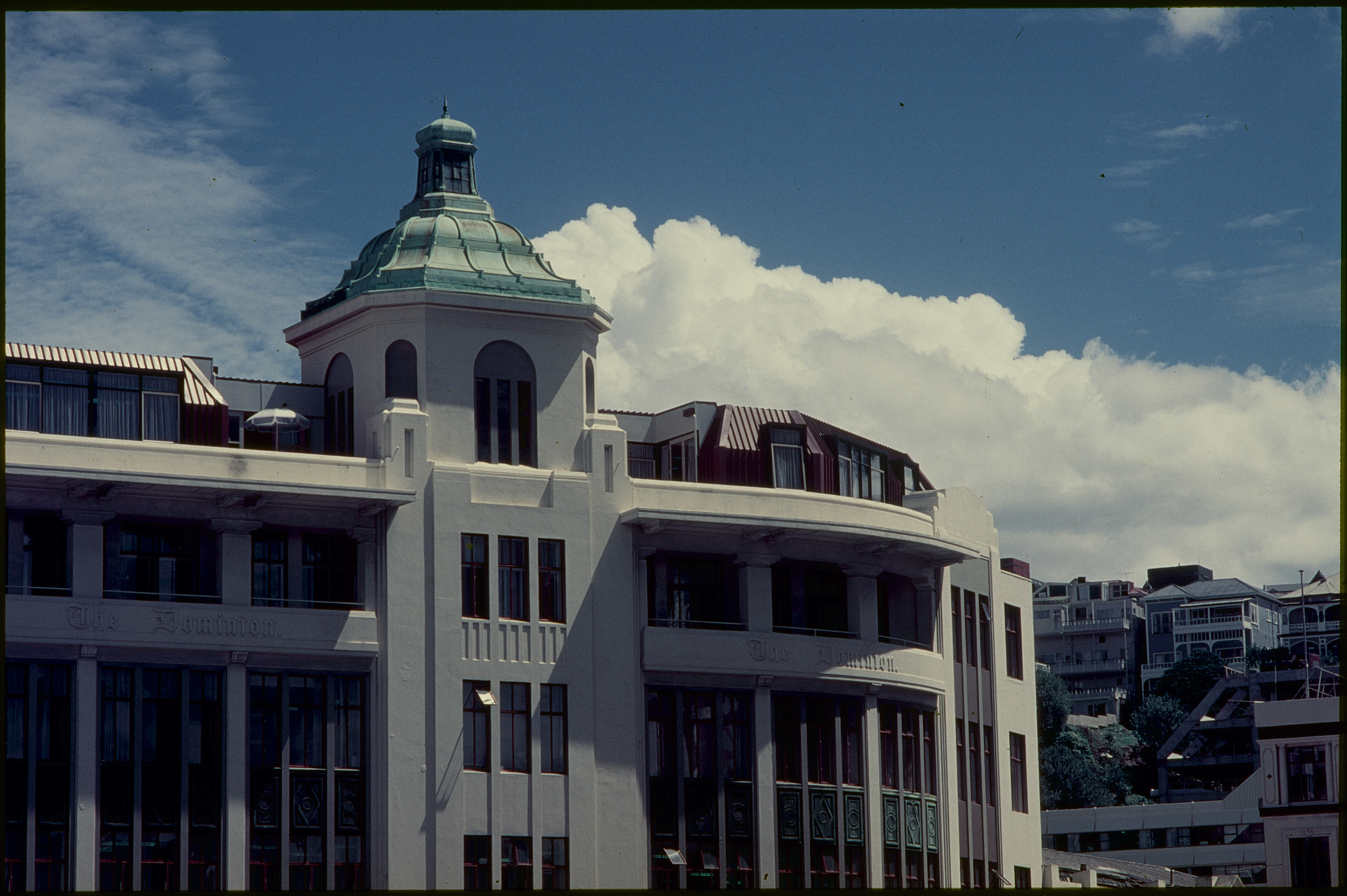
The turret of the Dominion Building

The Dominion Building is a historic structure on the corner of Mercer Street and Victoria Street in Wellington, New Zealand. Originally designed as the headquarters of The Dominion newspaper, it now houses a mix of apartments, offices and retail areas.

A distinctive seven-storey building of some elegance, the Dominion has a frontage of stone imported from Caen in France and interiors of Queensland marble. The building follows the bend in the road. Its most striking feature is a copper-covered tower with a lantern turret.

In the mid-1970s, The Dominion newspaper moved out of the building. The complex was redesigned by Ian Athfield in 1995.

The building is classified as a Category 2 Historic Place by Heritage New Zealand.

Investigation of the leaking turret dome in 2022 showed that repairs were necessary, and remediation work funded by the residents and Wellington City Council was carried out during 2023. Decayed timber was replaced, and the original copper was replaced with 1.5 tonnes of new copper.
