= Nairn Street Cottage =

Historic building and museum

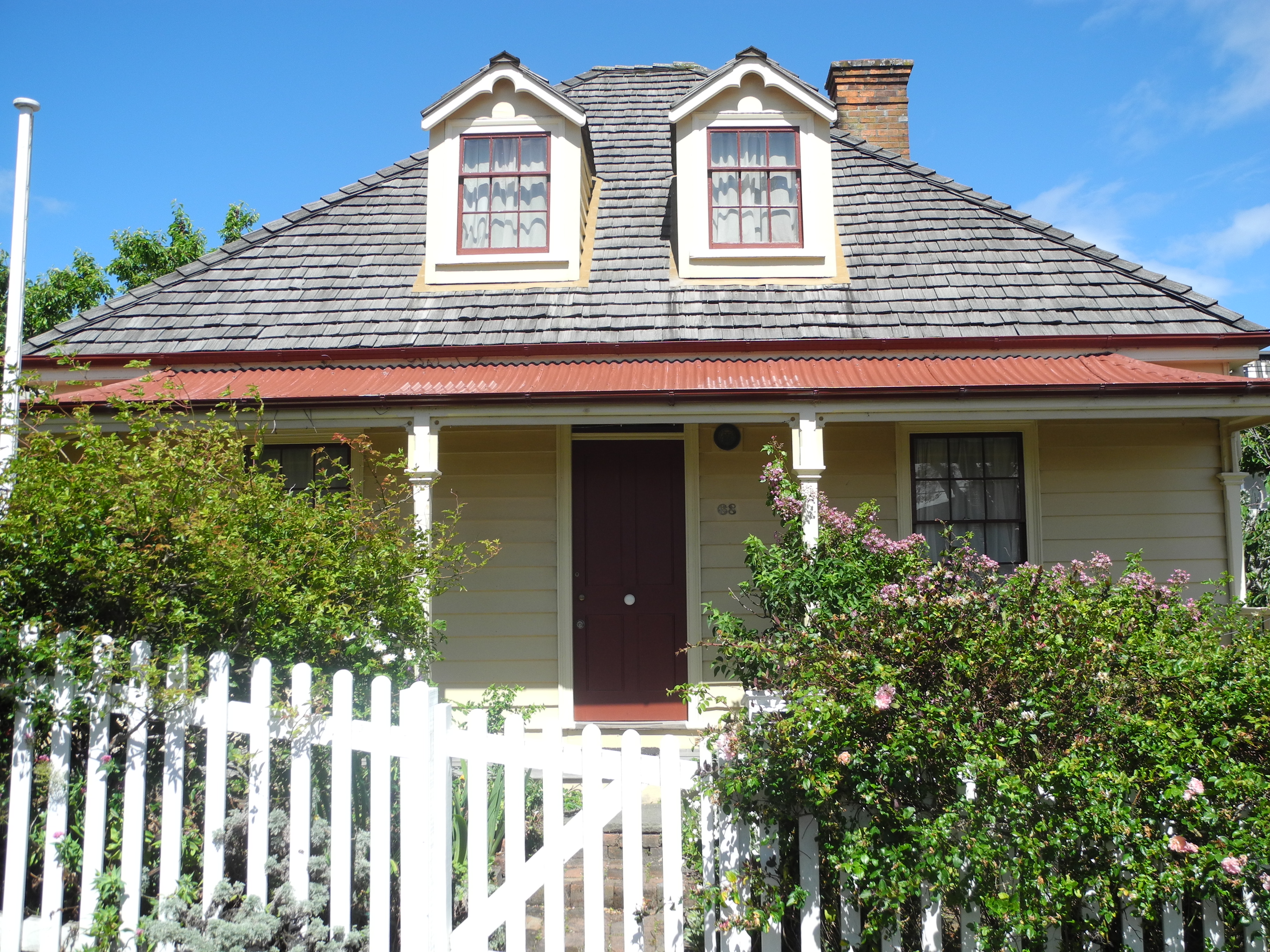
- Interactive map of the Nairn Street Cottage area
- Former names: Colonial Cottage Museum

General information
- Architectural style: Late Georgian style
- Location: 68 Nairn Street, Mount Cook, Wellington, New Zealand
- Coordinates: 41°17′57″S 174°46′12″E
- Current tenants: The Colonial Cottage Museum
- Completed: 1858
- Owner: Wellington City Council

Heritage New Zealand – Category 1
- Official name: Nairn Street Cottage
- Designated: 1986
- Reference no.: 1444

Nairn Street Cottage is Wellington's oldest original cottage. It was originally built by the Wallis family, who lived in the cottage for three generations. Tours of the cottage are available to hear about these early British colonists and their descendants, and the garden is open daily during daylight hours. Nairn Street Cottage is classified as a Category 1 Historic Place (places of "special or outstanding historical or cultural heritage significance or value") by Heritage New Zealand.

== Construction ==
The cottage was built in 1858 and is located on Nairn Street in the suburb of Mount Cook, Wellington. The Cottage was built in a late Georgian style and is similar to other houses built from that time through to about 1870. The Cottage was built by William Wallis who arrived in New Zealand in September 1857 with his wife Catherine.

== The Wallis family ==
William and Catherine were newly-weds who undertook an arduous seventeen-week journey by ship to arrive in New Zealand. Like many immigrants they came in search of a better life. Unlike many immigrants, Wallis purchased the Nairn Street site only after he viewed it. He chose the location specifically because there was a stream at the bottom of his town acre site. Wallis was aware of the necessity of a safe water supply after the 1855 Wairarapa earthquake had created tsunami that swamped Wellington town's water supply leading to several deaths from typhoid.

William had been apprenticed as a carpenter on The Crystal Palace in London. He also built hospitals in the Crimean War, which allowed him the skills and capital necessary to emigrate to the comparatively new colony. The cottage is almost entirely built of native New Zealand timber and was built by hand. His original tool chest remains in the cottage collection.

The Wallis family had 10 children altogether, but after their seventh child the family relocated to a larger house, which William also built, next door.

Descendants of the Wallis family remained in the cottage until the late seventies when the Wellington City Council earmarked the cottage for demolition so that council flats could be built in its place. The Council took the building under the Public Works Act in 1974 from Winifred Turner, a granddaughter of William and Catherine and the last person to live in the cottage. Only the tenacity of Winifred Turner saved the cottage and ensured that its historical value was recognised.

== Museum: 1980–current ==
The Colonial Cottage Museum Society campaigned to save the cottage from demolition, and established the cottage as an educational museum in 1980. The cottage is now owned by Wellington City Council and managed by the Wellington Museums Trust.

Nairn Street Cottage offers guided tours of the house and gardens. Each tour begins with a run through of the Wallis family's history and the significant events that occurred around the world during the 127 years that the Wallis family lived in Nairn Street Cottage.

All of the items within the cottage, with some exceptions, date from between 1850 and 1880. Several items belonged to the family, others were donated from other settler families, while others have been loaned or purchased.

Tours, group tours, and education visits are available at the museum.

In 2018 the cottage was temporarily closed and refurnished. The reopening signified a shift in focus – originally the cottage focused solely on William and Catherine Wallis; the refurbishment saw a wider focus on the different generations of the Wallis family from 1830 to 1970.
