= Bank of New Zealand Te Aro branch building =

Historic building on the corner of Manners and Cuba Street, Wellington, New Zealand

Bank of New Zealand building
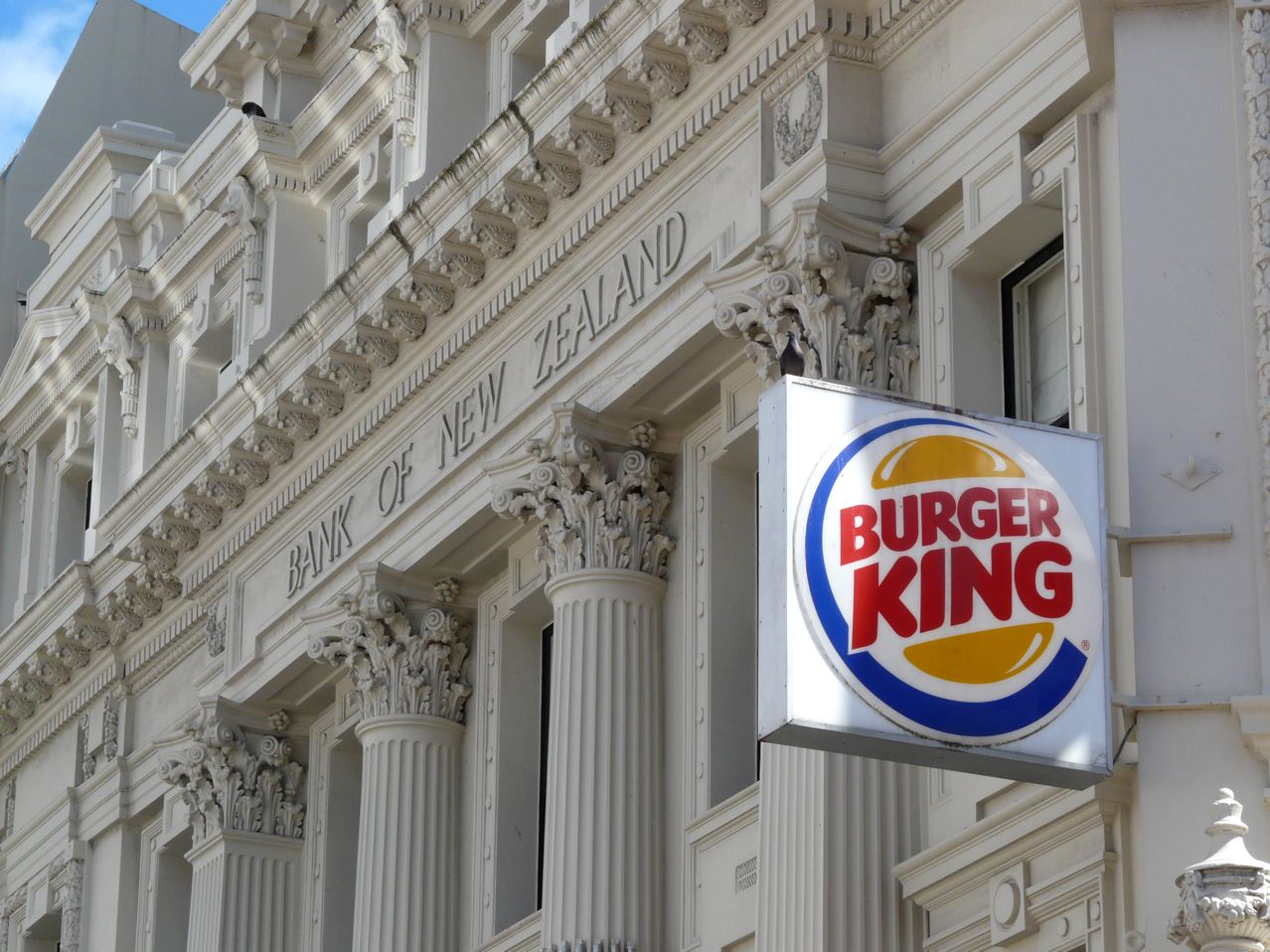
- Facade of the BNZ building in Cuba Street, Wellington
- Interactive map of the Bank of New Zealand building area

General information
- Location: 79-85 Manners Street, Wellington, New Zealand
- Coordinates: 41.291076°S 174.776859°E
- Completed: 1913

Design and construction
- Architects: Turnbull, William
- Main contractor: Campbell and Burke

Heritage New Zealand – Category 1
- Designated: 24-Nov-1988
- Reference no.: 1338

The Bank of New Zealand Te Aro branch building is a historic building on the corner of Manners and Cuba Street, Wellington, New Zealand.

The building, designed by William Turnbull (son of Thomas Turnbull), is one of Wellington's earliest reinforced concrete and steel structures. It features Corinthian columns and ornate projecting cornices. It was refurbished in the early 1980s.

The building, classified as a Category 1 Historic Place (places of "special or outstanding historical or cultural heritage significance or value") by Heritage New Zealand, housed a Burger King restaurant until April 2020.
