= Dominion Farmers' Institute =

Early 20th century reinforced concrete multi-story building

Coordinates: 41°16′54.36″S 174°46′39.71″E

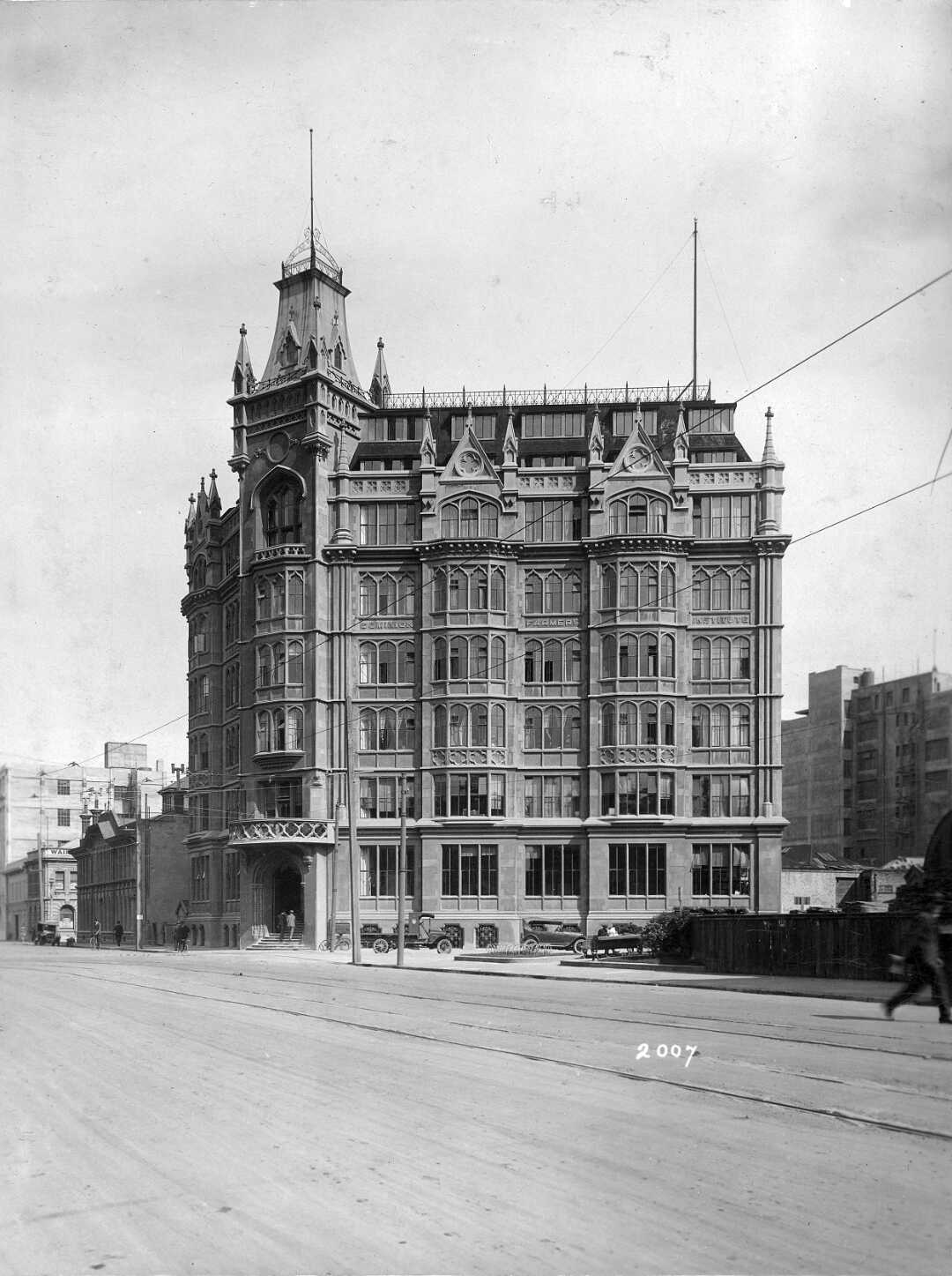
Dominion Farmers' Institute, Ballance Street frontage from Featherston Street

The Dominion Farmers' Institute was an investment company formed to erect a suitable building to house central national offices for New Zealand's agricultural, pastoral and horticultural associations and the many other groups involved with work on the land and their many products. Members attended national meetings in Wellington and often made group and individual representations to government ministers.

== Description ==
The site is on Featherston Street, Wellington, the nation's financial centre and yet close to government offices and Parliament. It has frontages to three streets 110-118 Featherston Street and 1, 3 and 5 Maginnity Street and Ballance Street. Construction was first proposed in 1915. Two foundation stones, one each side of the main entry, were laid on 26 July 1917 by the Governor General and The Prime Minister. The architects were Collins and Harman of Christchurch. The reinforced concrete building went up within twelve months erected by Fletcher Brothers later known as Fletcher Construction. It was completed in mid 1918.

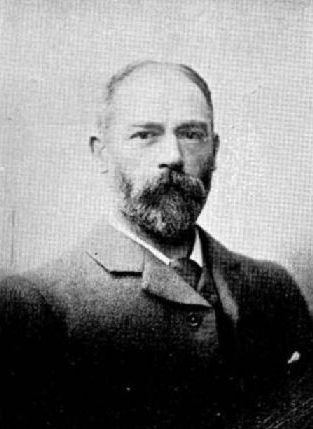
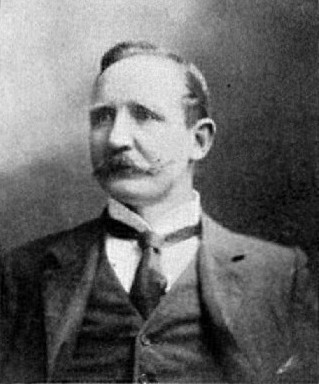
J.J. Collins and R.D. Harman (c. 1903)

"The building provides a large conference hall and committee rooms besides office accommodation. In the ultimate scheme provision is made for a farmers’ club and private hotel where visiting farmers may enjoy all the advantages of social intercourse with their fellows on their visits to the Empire City."

On completion it was claimed to be the largest reinforced concrete building south of the equator. It covers a quarter-acre block with frontages to Featherston, Ballance and Maginnity Streets and contains a total floor area in excess of two acres.

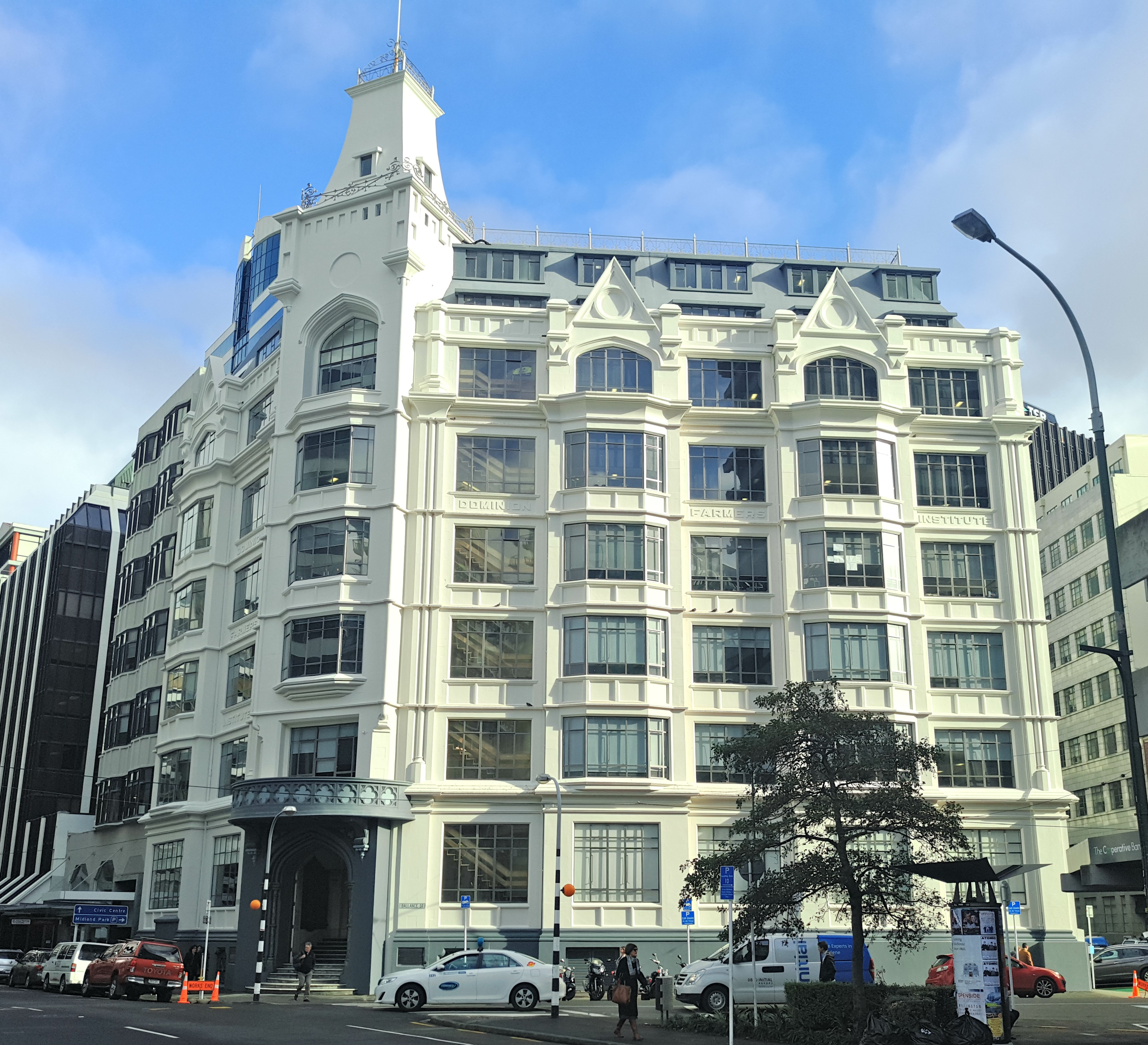
Corner of Featherston and Ballance Streets, 2018

Formally opened 27 May 1919.

Eighteen different farmers' organisations had taken space by the end of 1923. The building's own postal bureau had handled 272,000 letters and 15,400 cablegrams in the last financial year.

The Reserve Bank of New Zealand opened for business on the ground floor of the Dominion Famers' Building on 1 August 1934. On the same day it issued the first New Zealand bank notes replacing those issued by the trading banks. The Reserve Bank remained in the building until its own premises were finished on The Terrace in 1972.

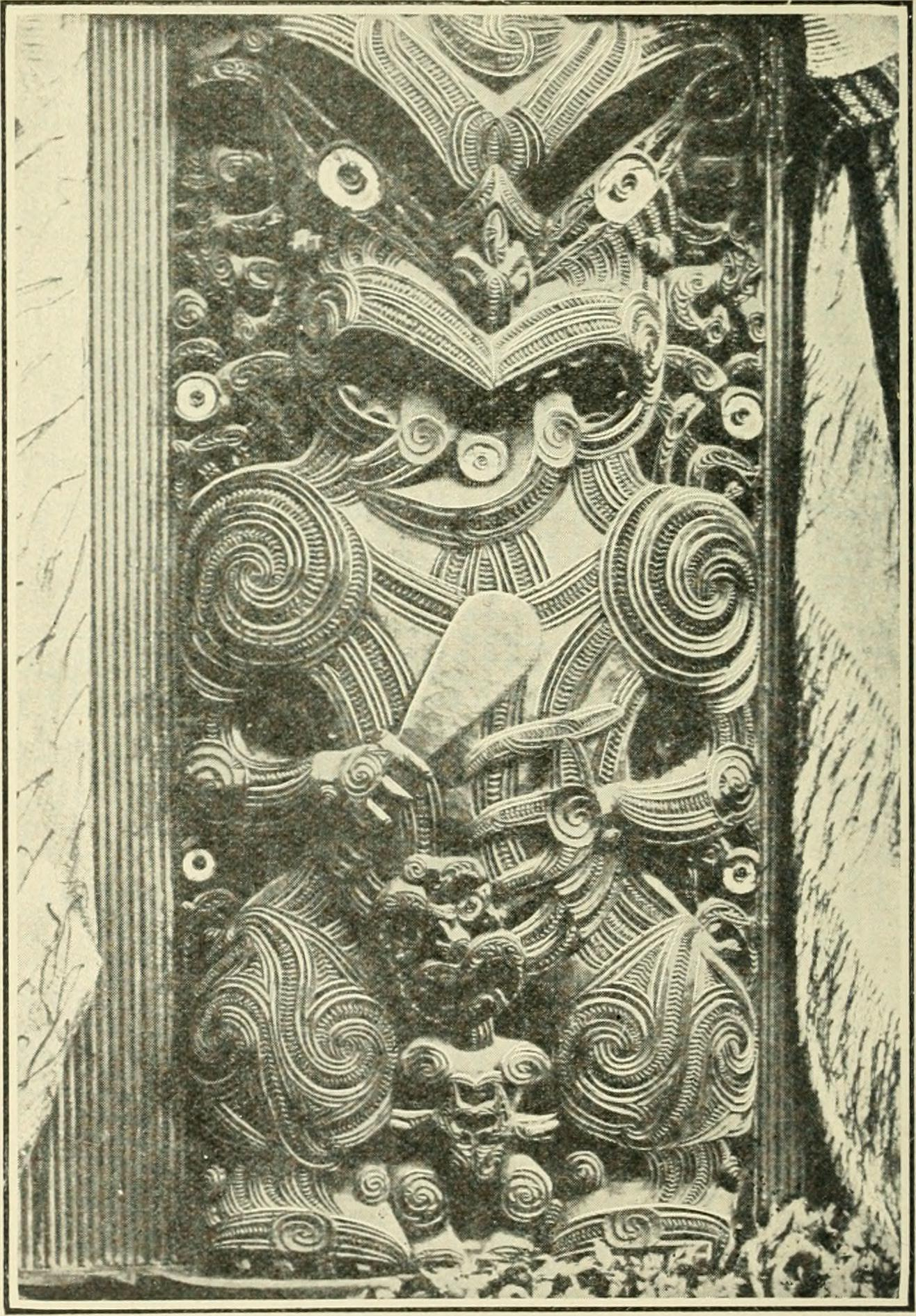
Panel, Te Hau-ti-Turanga

The Dominion Museum's Maori Collection including the Maori House originally built at Turanganui, Poverty Bay were housed in the building from 1924 until the new Dominion Museum was ready to house them.

The building is listed by Heritage New Zealand as a Category 2 Historic Place.

== Facilities ==
- Conference hall and rooms
- Tea rooms

"In the Dominion Farmers' Institute in downtown Wellington you may see a reconstructed moa on the stair landing."

== Tenants ==
(this list is not complete)

Farmers' organisations

- Dominion Farmers' Union —> New Zealand Farmers' Union —> Federated Farmers of New Zealand
- New Zealand Meat Producers' Board
- New Zealand Fruitgrowers' Federation
- New Zealand Forestry League
- New Zealand Apple and Pear Marketing Board

Government organisations

- Reserve Bank of New Zealand 1934 to 1972
- Department of Agriculture
- New Zealand Forest Service

Commercial organisations

- Farmers Co-operative Wholesale Federation
- New Zealand Dairy Board ??
- New Zealand Farmers' Co-operative Distributing Co
- Canadian National Railways

Other

- Italian Consulate
- Embassy of Belgium
