= John Martin (New Zealand politician) =

New Zealand politician and merchant (1822–1892)

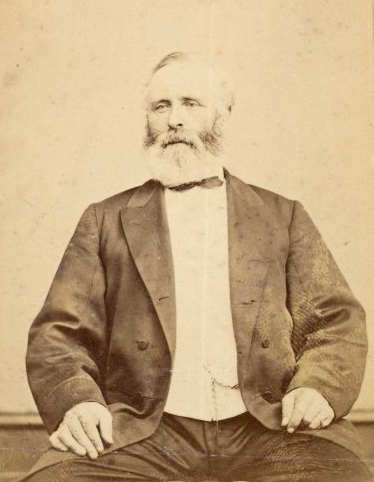
- Martin in circa 1880
- Born: 11 November 1822; Moneymore, County Londonderry, Ireland
- Died: 17 May 1892 (aged 69)
- Known for: naming Martinborough in his namesake

John (Johnny) Martin (1822 – 17 May 1892) was a "labourer, carter, merchant, politician, runholder, [and] land speculator".

== Early life ==
Martin was born in Moneymore, County Londonderry, Ireland on 11 November 1822. His family travelled to New Zealand on Lady Nugent, eventually landing at Port Nicholson, on 17 March 1841.

== Political career ==
Martin was made a justice of the peace by William Fitzherbert in 1876, and in 1878 was called to the New Zealand Legislative Council by Premier George Grey.

He was to be a member of the Legislative Council from 25 July 1878 to 17 May 1892, when he died. During his 14-year career in the Legislative Council, he only spoke four times, and came to be known as the "silent member".
