= Bob Vance =

Bob Vance may refer to:

- Bob Vance (fictional character), character from The Office
- Leon Vance (1916–1944), American soldier
- Bob Vance (jurist) (born 1961), American jurist who ran for Alabama Supreme Court in 2012, son of assassinated judge Robert S. Vance
- Bob Vance (cricketer) (1924–1994), New Zealand cricketer and cricket administrator

== See also ==
- Robert Vance (disambiguation)
