= Wellesley College, New Zealand =

Wellesley College

Location
- 611 Marine Drive, Days Bay, Lower Hutt 5013, New Zealand; 41.2781°S 174.9065°E

Information
- Type: Independent, Boys, full primary (Years 1–8)
- Motto: Amat Victoria Curam (Victory Through Care)
- Established: Croydon's first term at Day's Bay began Wed. 11 February 1914
- Ministry of Education Institution no.: 4149
- Principal: Michael Bain
- Enrolment: 350
- Website: wellesley.school.nz

Wellesley College is a boys-only independent primary school founded in 1914 as Croydon in Days Bay, Eastbourne, New Zealand. It was a boarding school which also took day pupils.

The Croydon name continues in Wellesley's Croydon House but the school's name was changed to Wellesley when Croydon and Wellesley were amalgamated in 1940. Wellesley or Banks Commercial College had been in central Wellington on The Terrace.

Wellesley became a day school about 1972.

== An Anglican Diocesan school ==
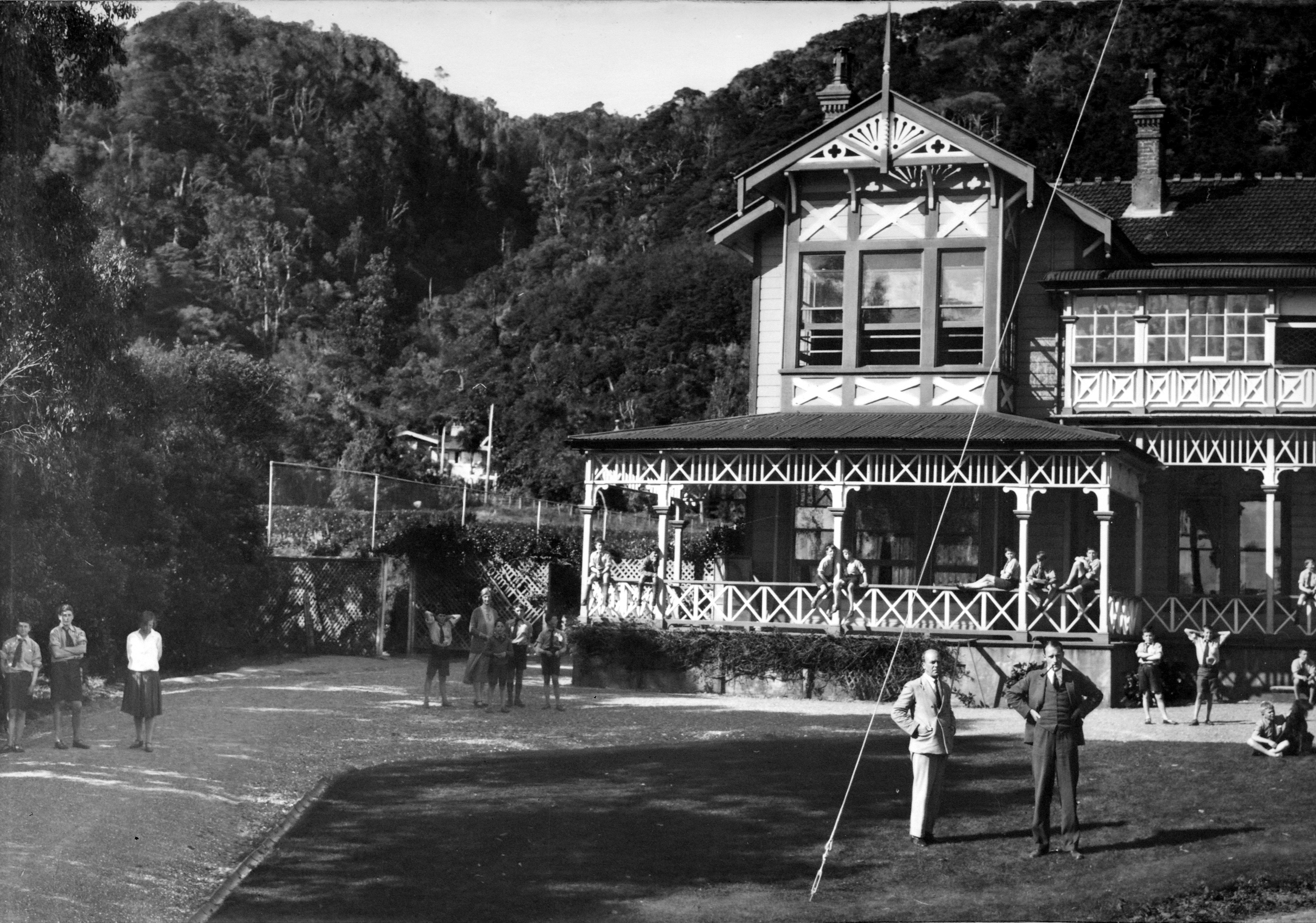
Boys, Mrs Skelley Claude Skelley and Courtenay Hall 1928

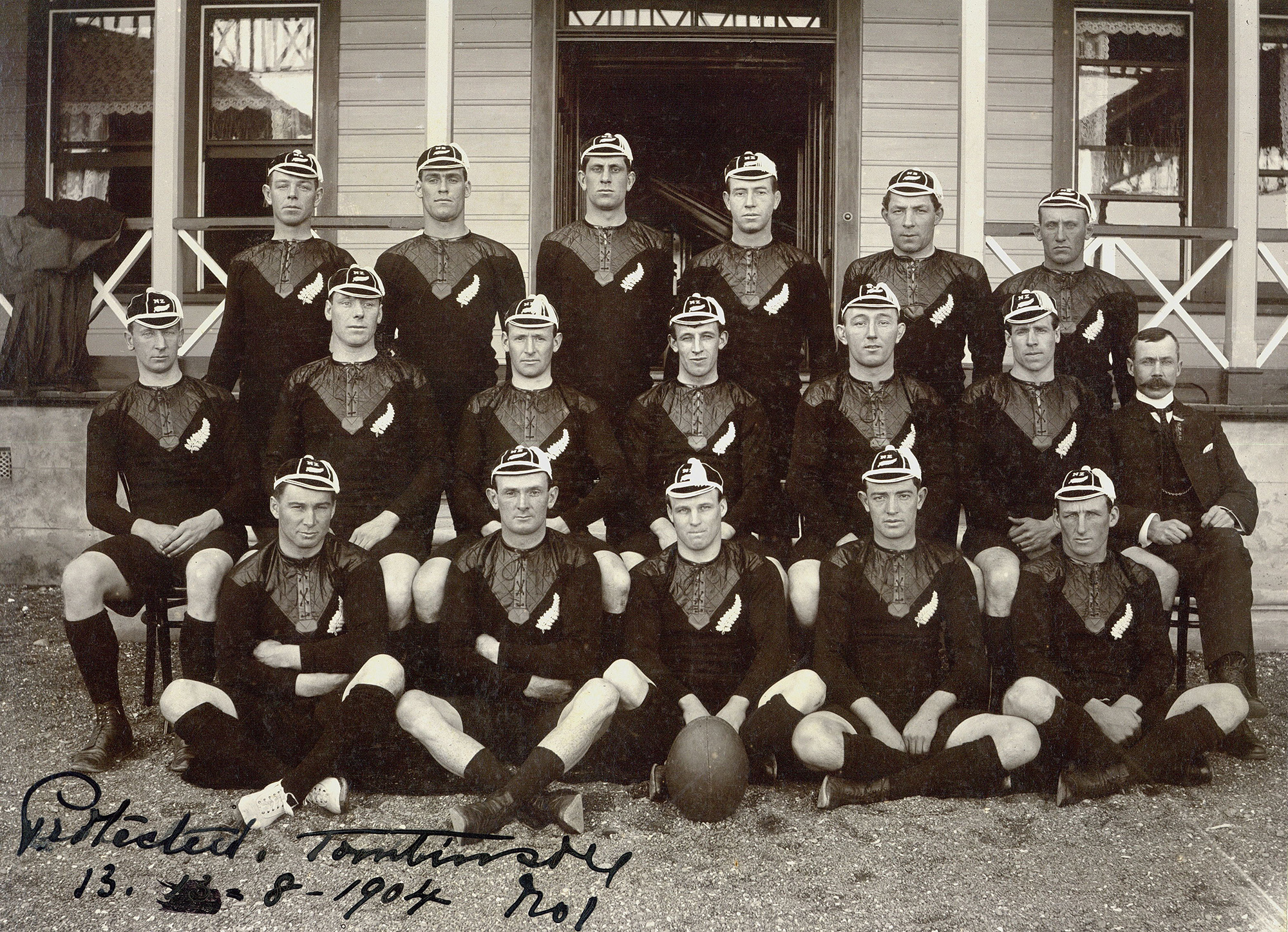
All Blacks at the front door

Wellesley provides classes for boys from Year 0 to Year 8. The school's roll is currently managed to a level of around 340 boys providing an average class size of 23. While core Christian values are maintained representatives of other beliefs have always been a part of Croydon and Wellesley.

Team and athletic sports are provided for and there is a full complement of the necessary facilities. The sheltered waters of Day's Bay and its bush-clad backdrop give opportunities for less structured activities. The curriculum includes the performing arts and visual arts.

Now only a day school until 1970 its core was a boarding school drawing boys from remote-dwelling farming families all over the central North Island, Rangitikei, Hawkes Bay and Wairarapa plus a fair share of city boys. On school-days more boys, then as now, came by ferry or bussed from Wellington and the many parts of the Hutt. The school's acquisition of the fine grounds and the first accommodation came about through a commercial failure.

== History ==
Day's Bay House was built in 1903 for ship-owner, J H Williams, turned ferry service and eastern-harbour property developer. His Wellington Steam Ferry Company Limited made the heart of Day's Bay a destination resort and sports complex. The hotel operation met with only moderate success and in 1913 with its immediate surrounds, 4 acres, it was sold to Miss Gladys Sommerville so she might expand her successful Croydon School then still based at 81 Hill Street Thorndon.

=== Williams Park ===
The remaining property was then bought by the Wellington City Council and is named Williams Park.

=== Croydon ===
With little or no change, Day's Bay House became Croydon Preparatory School for Boys. The old croquet-lawn became the sports field and in the 1920s the hotel's bowling-green became the boys' tennis courts. The rugby field remained at the southern side of the driveway but was not part of school grounds. The Pavilion and its amusements like the ferries and their wharf became part of (out-of-bounds) school life.

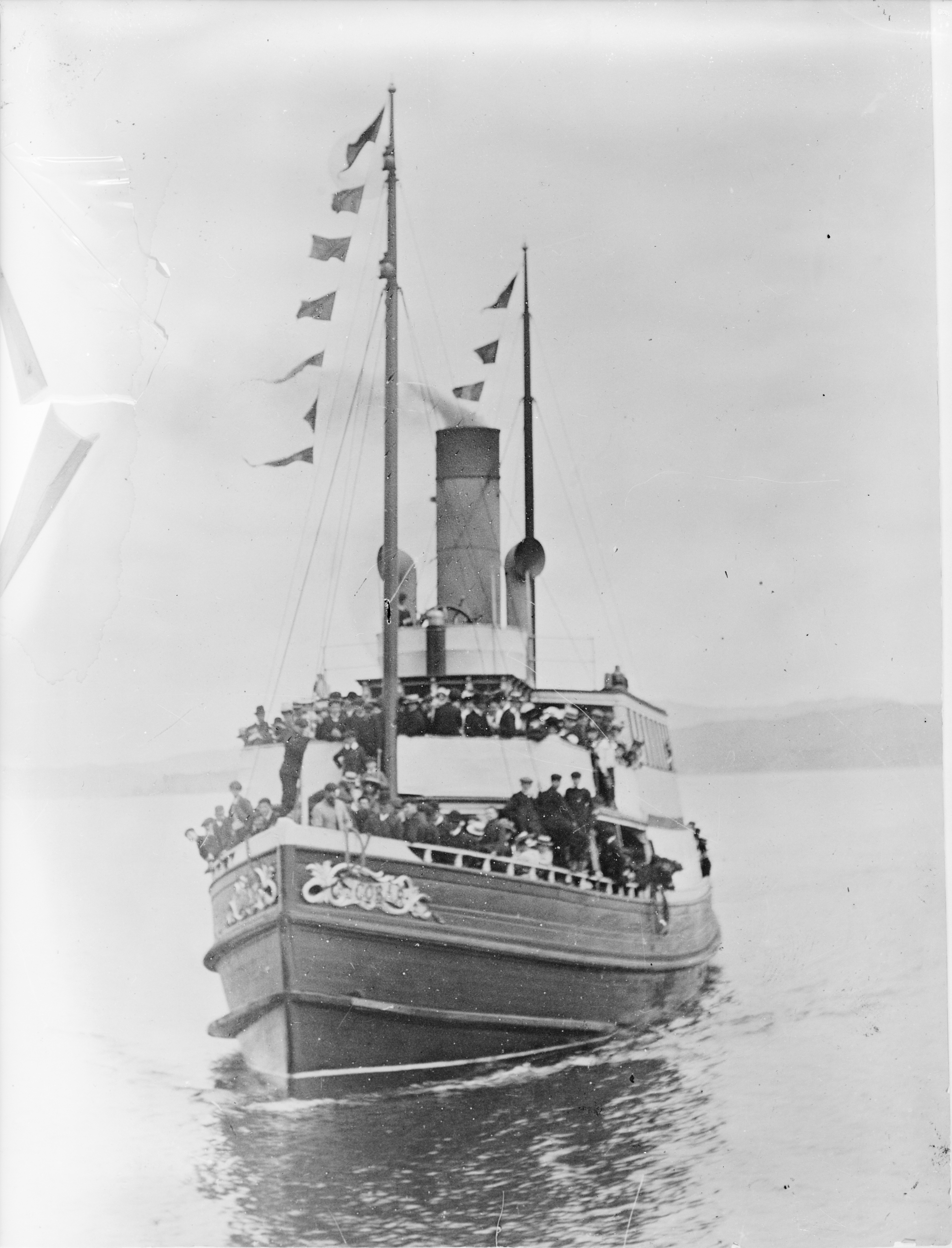
s s Cobar with flagpole(s)

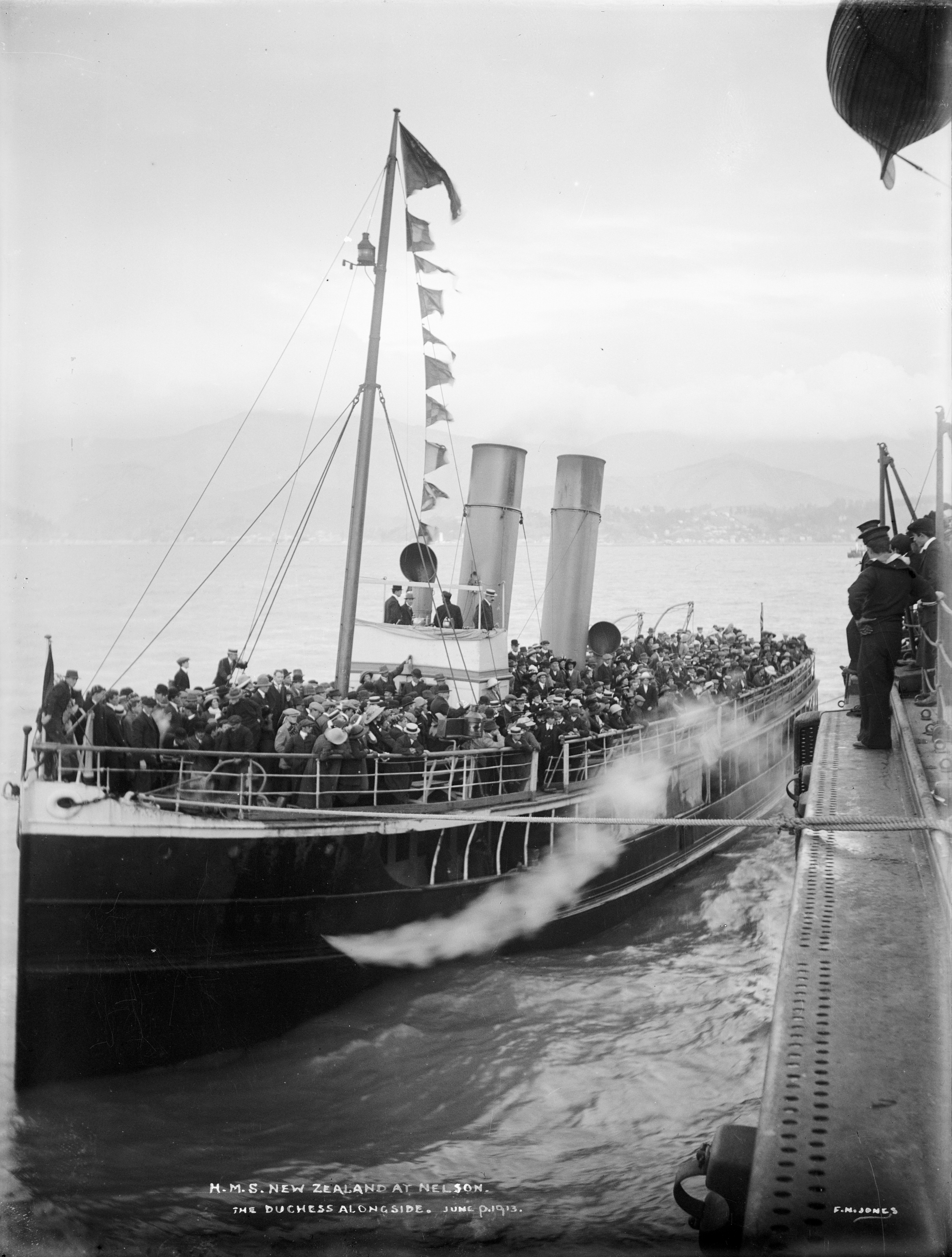
s s Duchess on a weekend excursion to Nelson

Upstairs on the northern side two pairs of bedrooms became dorms 1 and 2 and the upstairs guest sitting-room became dorm 3. Ultimately the (lightly) enclosed upstairs central verandah became a dormitory for the bigger boys. A comparatively well built first-floor room was added on high posts at the north-east corner to form a sick-bay. The main sitting-room was used by the principal but otherwise all accommodation and facilities were used as for the hotel. Boys were not permitted to use the main staircase.

Two corrugated-iron walled additions were made at the back of the main building; an assembly hall cum gymnasium with a very rarely used fireplace all on the same level as the main building and a two-storied block of four small classrooms up on the slope behind it, each with a tiny fireplace. The stairs to the upper floor were dramatically steep. Infant classes remained in the north-facing rooms of the main building by the gymnasium.

Miss Sommerville returned to Thorndon to direct the school from her house in Hill Street.

The school flagpole was the mast of the Cobar. The Cobar was built to be the luxurious steam yacht of a mining magnate, William Longworth, of Port Stephens and Point Piper and principal of the Great Cobar Copper Mining Company in New South Wales, Australia. The mining company struck temporary financial difficulties. Cobar was less than four years old, Williams had attended its launching, and his Wellington Ferry Company snapped it up, sailed it over from Sydney and made the NSW coastal vessel a Day's Bay ferry. Cobar became so much part of the community its name has since been recycled for successors. She was able to carry 900 passengers but licensed for just 745 people.

=== Wellington Diocesan Boys' School —Croydon ===
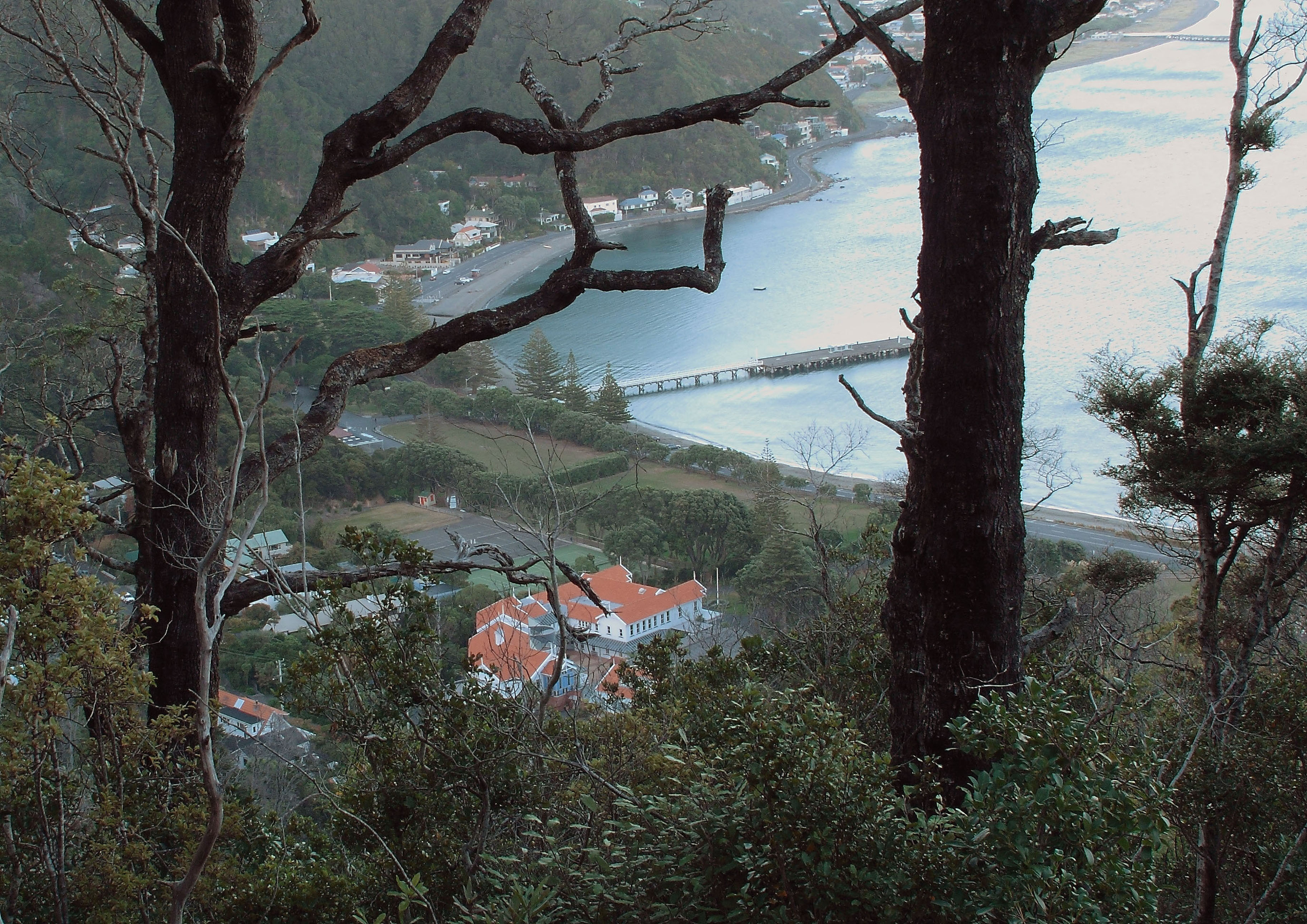
Wellesley, early morning April 2010

In April 1919 the Wellington Diocesan Church Schools Board purchased Croydon (and also Mrs Swainson's school renaming it Marsden).

Croydon would be a boarding school. The Board already had day schools in: Waverley, Masterton, Taihape (St Margaret's), Marton, Hawera, and at St Mark's Wellington.

Board personnel were: Dr Sprott (bishop), Miss Baber (Marsden school), Rev R Franklin (St Barnabas Roseneath, diocesan organising secretary), Messrs. A E Mabin, W J Birch, G Shirtcliffe and J F Studholme. (Note: Arthur Emerson Mabin (c1867-1944) of Levin & Co, William John Birch (1842–1920) of Marton, Sir George Shirtcliffe (1862–1941) prominent in Wellington's financial and business community, Joseph Francis Studholme (1866–1930) of Taihape (later of Fendalton))

The generous help of the last four men as guarantors was acknowledged by the bishop when the school re-opened on 6 June 1919. The bishop advised that failing health had obliged Miss Sommerville to retire and she would not remain head of the school having given her "strong opinion" that the school should have a headmaster. The Rev R H Hobday had been appointed. The opening ceremony concluded with the hearty singing of the National Anthem.

The new name for the school did not persist: soon it reverted to Croydon.

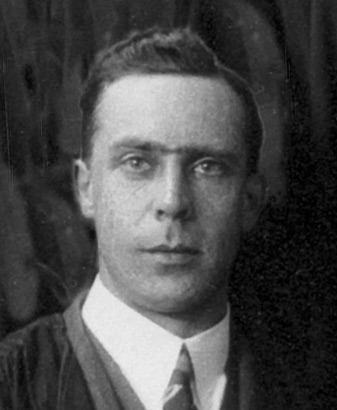
Hutton Stevens 1927 master at Wellington College

=== Wellesley College ===
Wellesley College, at 98 The Terrace, Wellington, was registered in 1938 to W. H. Stevens Ltd. In 1940 William Hutton Stevens leased the premises of Croydon School from the Wellington Diocesan Board and moved his day school, Wellesley College, which had been situated on The Terrace, to Day's Bay and into them. The pupils of the Wellington Diocesan School for Boys (Croydon) were taken over by W. H. Stevens Ltd.; and the company was required to provide for religious instruction in accordance with the doctrines of the Church of England in co-operation with the local vicar. Over some lasting resistance, Stevens declared the two schools merged.

Stevens had taught locally at Wellington College for 15 years, being on the staff in 1917, before becoming head of Wellesley College, in 1933. (Note: Banks's —later Banks— Commercial College established a primary and secondary boys day school in Wellington in 1915. By 1920 it had 150 pupils and new premises were found for it in three houses at 96–102 The Terrace, later the site of Shell House now Transpower House. When it re-opened at the beginning of 1921 to distinguish it from Banks Commercial College it was named Wellesley College. The Evening Post, 17 December 1920) He carried out the school merger in 1949, and retired in 1965. He was free in the use of corporal punishment with a strap he called "Dr. Tawse", referring to the Scottish tawse.

=== Wellington Diocesan Board's Wellesley College ===
In 1965 the Diocesan Board regained management of the premises and in the end elected to retain the name Wellesley.

The corrugated-iron additions with the sick-bay annexe and laundry were demolished and new buildings erected there and on the former bowling-green tennis courts. New classrooms were opened at the beginning of 1969 and the new gymnasium / hall at the beginning of the 3rd term of the same year.

=== St Martin's church ===
The little Arts & Crafts style church was put beside the school in 1922 at what is now 2 Pitoitoi Road. Much of its external character was given by its proportions, the fashionable way it had been painted and its high white-washed pebble-dash walls. At services a parishioner played its harmonium and there was sometimes evensong as well as matins.

Without its term-time boarders and within Eastbourne's parish the church building was removed in 1973 and the site sold.

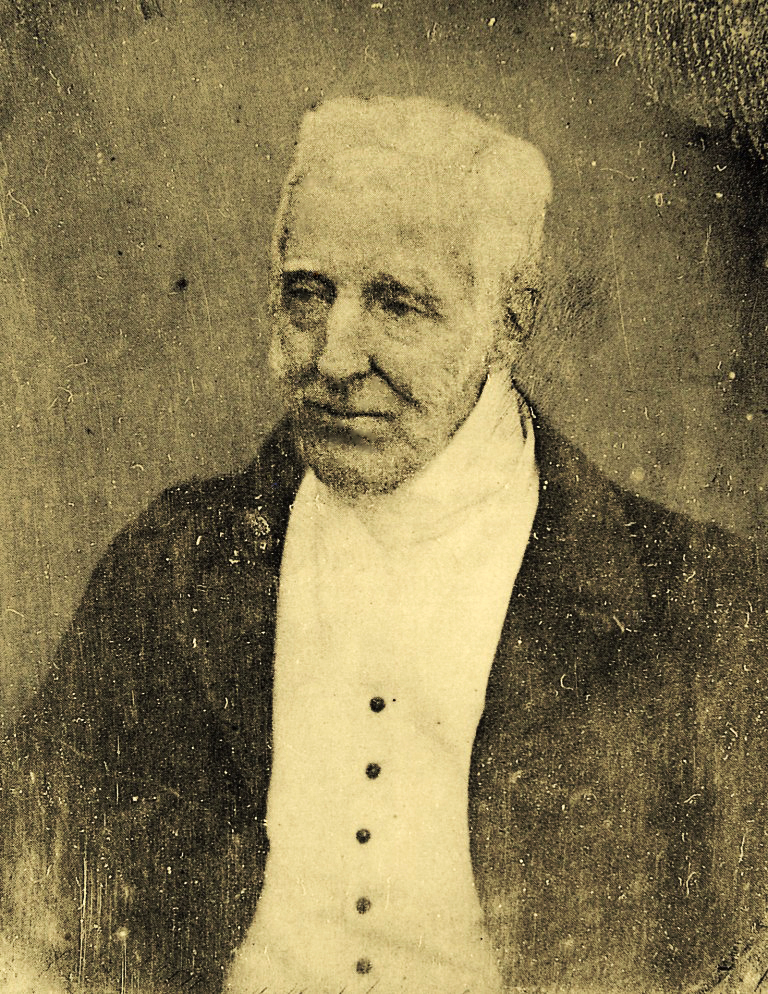
Arthur Wellesley duke of Wellington 1844

== Houses ==
Wellesley as of 2014 has four houses: Wellington, Marlborough, Selwyn and Croydon.

- Wellington house is named after Arthur Wellesley, duke of Wellington
- Marlborough house is named after John Churchill, duke of Marlborough
- Selwyn house is named after George Augustus Selwyn, first bishop of New Zealand
- Croydon, the newest house was voted by the boys and named after the old Wellesley

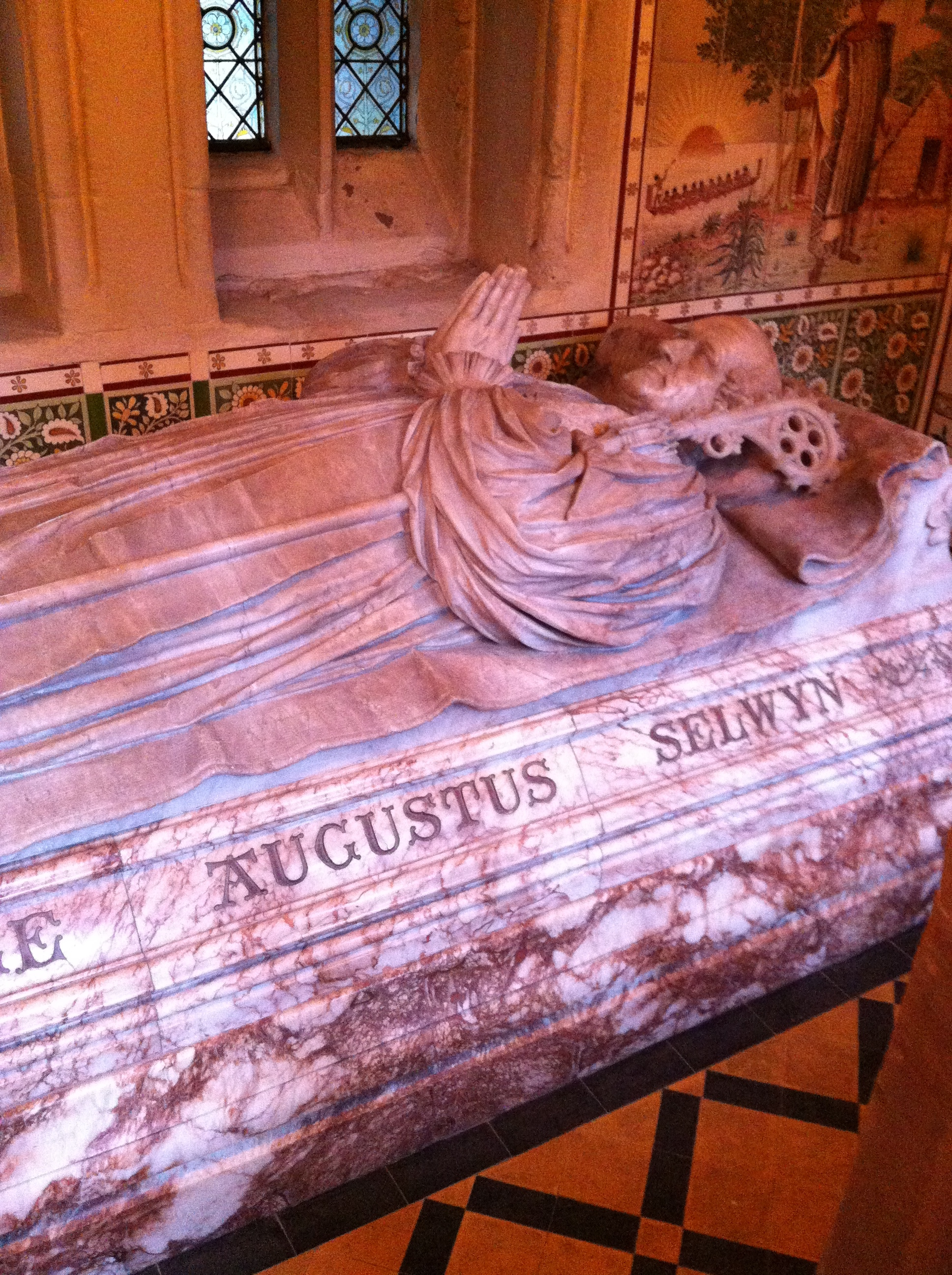
Selwyn memorial Lichfield, England

== Notable alumni ==
- Georgina Beyer (1957–2023), world's first transsexual MP
- Lord Cooke of Thorndon (1926–2006), judge
- Marc Ellis (born 1971), rugby league and rugby union player, businessman, and television presenter
- Alan Gibbs (born 1939), creator of the Aquada amphibious vehicle
- Peter Harcourt (1923–1995), broadcaster, actor, playwright
- Jock Hobbs (1960–2012), All Black and chairman of the New Zealand Rugby Union
- Edgar Kain DFC (1918–1940), air ace of World War II
- Sir John Ormond (1905–1995), chairman of the New Zealand Meat Producers Board
- Sir John Todd KNZM (1927–2015), businessman; Dux in 1943
- Selwyn Toogood (1916–2001), radio and television personality
- Robert Vance (born 1955), cricketer
- John White (1911–2007), jurist
- Richard Wilkins (born 1954), an Australian TV personality; runner-up Dux in his final year

== Principals ==
- Ellen Gladys Sommerville (1884–1958), founder
- Rev Richard Henry Hobday MA BD (1879) 1920–1922
- Claude Henry Thomas Skelley (1880–1962), 1922–1940
- William Hutton Stevens (1893–1980), 1940–1965
- John Bellamy, 1966–1969
- Pat Beatson, 1970–1972
- Arthur Curtis 1972–1977
- Graeme Dreadon 1978–1994
  - Steve Girvan 1984–2020 (deputy)
- Warren Owen 1995–2014
- Brendan Pitman 2015–2020
- Michael Bain 2021–present

== Notable staff ==
- Jack Lamason (1905–1961), NA Cricket representative 1935/1936 and 1937/1938.
- Arthur Porritt (1900–1994), Sole Games Master 1919, New Zealand Olympic representative and Governor-General. A great athlete, like his friend David Cecil he required his name to be changed (to Tom Watson) in the film Chariots of Fire.
- Murray Beresford Roberts
