= Robert Vance =

Robert Vance may refer to:

- Robert Vance (cricketer) (born 1955), New Zealand cricketer
- Robert B. Vance (1828–1899), U.S. representative from North Carolina, nephew of Robert Brank Vance
- Robert Brank Vance (1793–1827), U.S. representative from North Carolina, uncle of Robert B. Vance
- Robert J. Vance (1854–1902), U.S. representative from Connecticut
- Robert Smith Vance (1931–1989), U.S. Court of Appeals judge
- Robert C. Vance (1894–1959), Connecticut newspaper publisher and philanthropist

== See also ==
- Bob Vance (disambiguation)
