= Ferries in Wellington =

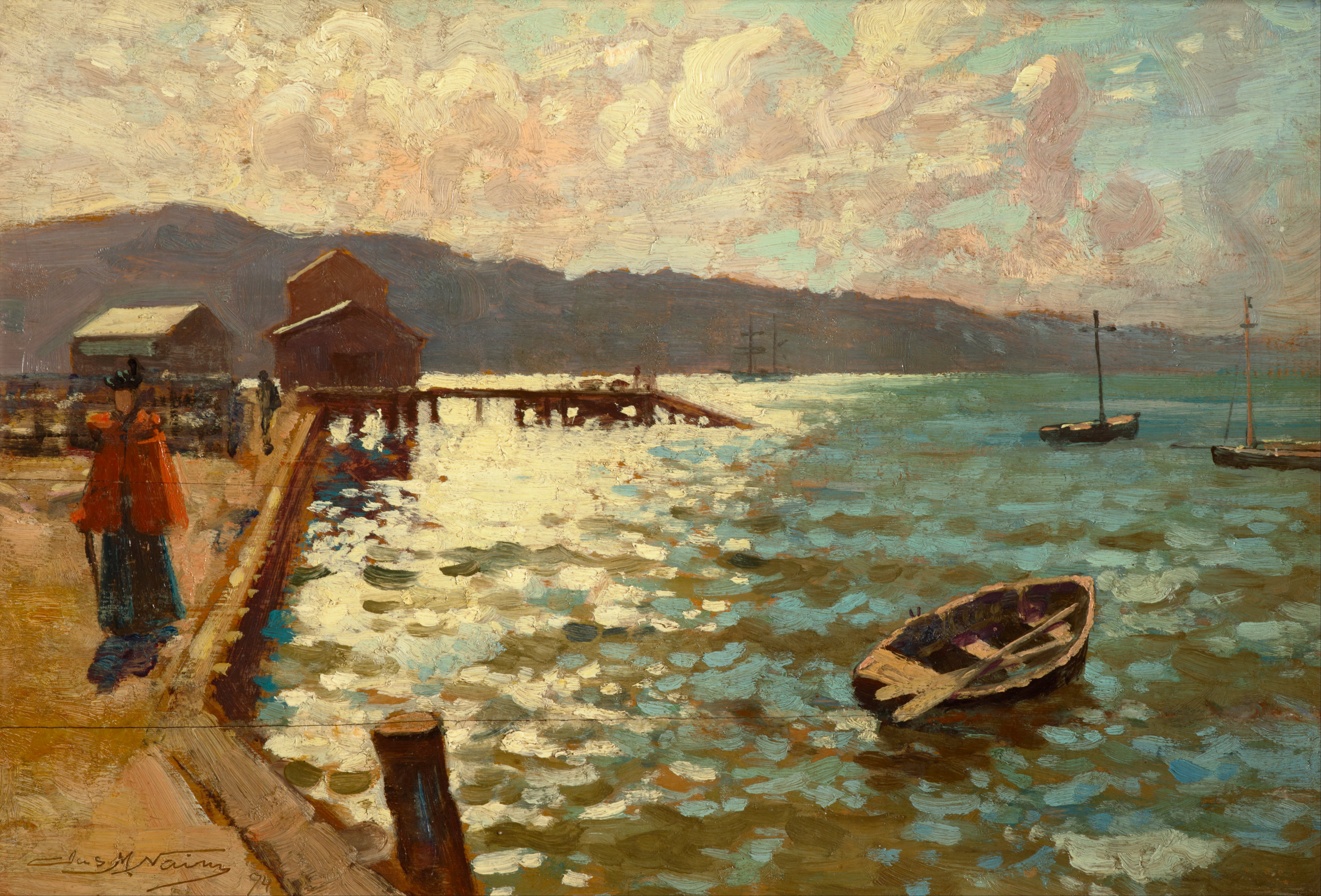
Wellington Harbour, 1894 by J. M. Nairn

Ferries within Wellington's harbour carry commuters and tourists on Wellington Harbour and form a part of the Wellington public transport system in New Zealand. They operate between central Wellington, Days Bay (near Eastbourne), Seatoun, and Matiu/Somes Island. Until 2016, services also ran to Petone on weekends. Historically they also served Lowry Bay and Rona Bay—the ferries belonged to the Eastbourne Borough Council from 1913 to 1950—and briefly, until 1913, Miramar and Karaka Bay. The development of road connections around the harbour's edge, particularly once they were paved during the 1920s, reduced the importance of ferries to the city's transport network, but regular services still run.

Some of the most notable vessels were the SS Cobar and SS Duchess. Cobar was the longest serving, 42 years from 1906 to 1948 when all services ended because Cobar was badly damaged by fire. Duchess was specially built for Port Nicholson in 1897 but licensed to carry 1,029 against Cobar's 745 passengers she had to be first to go when commuters switched to the buses in the 1920s. She was laid up by the council in 1929 and sold in 1930.

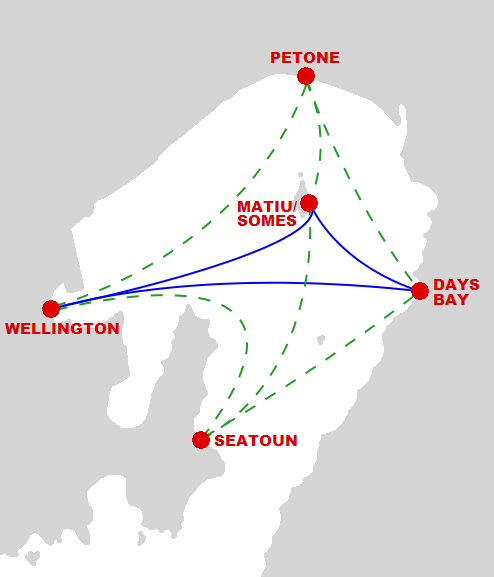
Map of ferry routes in Wellington in 2007, blue representing daily services, green represents weekend-only services

== Routes ==
A ferry service to Days Bay began in 1893 and later served Eastbourne (at Rona Bay). The service was taken over by the Eastbourne Borough Council in 1913 and continued to operate until 1948.

In 1989, a new ferry service was established to Days Bay. It is the only commuter ferry in operation in Wellington. It is run by the private company East by West, with a subsidy from local authorities.

Ferry services from central Wellington to Miramar, Seatoun and Karaka Bay began in 1901. There were several runs each day, operated by a private company, Wellington Harbour Ferries. A second company, the Miramar Ferry Company, began operations the following year, but was bought out by Wellington Harbour Ferries in 1906. Improvements to road connections, notably the construction of the Seatoun Tunnel, made road journeys substantially quicker and easier, and caused patronage to drop—regular services ceased in 1913. In 2006, weekend services to Seatoun resumed followed in March 2008 by a commuter service.

Attempts have been made in recent years to establish a ferry service from central Wellington to Petone, on the northern coast of the harbour. Although there is a major road and rail corridor connecting Petone and Wellington, a ferry service might reduce congestion and possibly provide a faster journey. A trial commuter service was withdrawn in the mid-2000s after failing to attract the level of patronage expected, but Petone continued to be served by a weekend "Harbour Explorer" service until the wharf was damaged in the 2016 Kaikōura earthquake. The Hutt City Council planned in 2017 to spend NZ$8 million on repairing the wharf. Both the East by West ferry company and the mayor of Lower Hutt, Ray Wallace, expressed interest in reintroducing a commuter service.

Although Matiu / Somes Island has never had a substantial population its establishment as a nature reserve generated demand for a ferry service. The island opened to the public in 1995 and off-peak and weekend ferries call on request.

== Vessels ==
These vessels also carried Wellington Harbour Board's pilots and towed large vessels within the harbour.

Name	Operator	In service	Retired	Max Passengers	Gross Tons	Length (meters)	Speed (knots)	Notes
Admiral				616				Placed on the coastal trade.
Aorere	Eastbourne Borough Council							Purchased for cargo-carrying; the service was not a success.
Awaroa	Wellington Harbour Ferries	1911						Built c. 1908 in Sydney for Auckland owners for the Northern Wairoa run
City Cat	East by West Ferries	2000		91		14.5	20	Composite fibreglass design by Malcolm Tennant, built by Martin Blumhart, Auckland for the Gulf Harbour ferry, bought by Fullers in 1998 and by East by West in 1990, 2 x John Deere 6 cylinder engines produce 300 brake horsepower (220 kW)
Cobar	Wellington Harbour Ferries	1906	1948	900	159			Built by George de Fraine, Laurieton, New South Wales in 1903 for William Longworth of Sydney and Cobar Mining, bought 1906 by Wellington Harbour Ferries Company, only authorised to transport 745 passengers. Cobar collided with the Duchess in the early evening of 30 March 1910. A magisterial enquiry decided both masters were equally at fault and their master's certificates were suspended for one year. Burned overnight at Days Bay wharf March 1948 and taken out of service.
Cobar Cat	East by West Ferries	2005		99		17	22	
Countess	Wellington Harbour Ferries	1901	1910		141	30.8		HP steam engine. Launched by Messrs Logan's, Auckland 27 November 1900 for the Wellington Ferry Company's Day's Bay service. Engines were placed on board by A&G Price at Thames. Sold to Napier for a trawler in 1910 and later to Sanford Limited in Auckland. She became a hulk and sank at her Shoal Bay moorings in 1934.
Duchess	Wellington Harbour Ferries	1897	1929	1,200	308	40.5	12	Steel, triple-expansion engines, specially built for Wellington Harbour Ferries by Mackie & Thompson, Glasgow in 1897. Laid up by owners Eastbourne Borough Council in 1929. She was sold to Auckland for the run to Kawau Island in November 1930.
Duco		1892	1909	420				Built primarily as a tug on the Clyde in 1892 for J H Williams. Converted to a fishing boat Duco disappeared on a voyage to the Chatham Islands in November 1909.
Himatangi								
Ika Rere	East by West Ferries	2022		132		19.0	20	Southern hemisphere's first electric ferry
Karaka								
Loyalty	Miramar Ferry Company	1901				29.0		Ex-French gunboat at Noumea. Kauri, copper-fastened; 95 ft, beam 16 ft, depth of hold 7 ft, draught 5 or 6 ft.
Mana		1886	1897	280				Built by W. R. Williams. Sold to Patea Shipping Company in 1897.
Moa		1880		350			7	Served a triple purpose as lighter, tug and excursion steamer taking picnickers to Somes Island. In 1886 Moa was lengthened and greatly altered and placed in the coastal trade. Owner Captain W. R. Williams (father of Captain J. H. Williams) then built the Mana at his yard on Te Aro beach and a wharf at Lowry Bay.
Moturoa								
Muritai	Eastbourne Borough Council Transport Services	1923	1940	1,500		52.6	13	172 ft 6 ins, length b.p. 165 ft, beam 30 ft, depth 12 ft 3 in. Twin triple-expansion engines, two boilers running on oil or coal. Built at Montrose, Scotland, for the council and launched in December 1922, arrived in May 1923 and called the "Greyhound of Eastbourne's fleet". Taken over in August, 1940, by the New Zealand Division of the Royal Navy for defence purposes and renamed HMS Muritai.
Ocean Cruiser	Port Nicholson Launch Company	1951	1951					Re-engined Fairmile, previously in service in Fremantle. Perhaps became HMNZS Maori (P3570).
Opawa								
Pilot				150				Sold to the North as a tug.
Queen of the South								

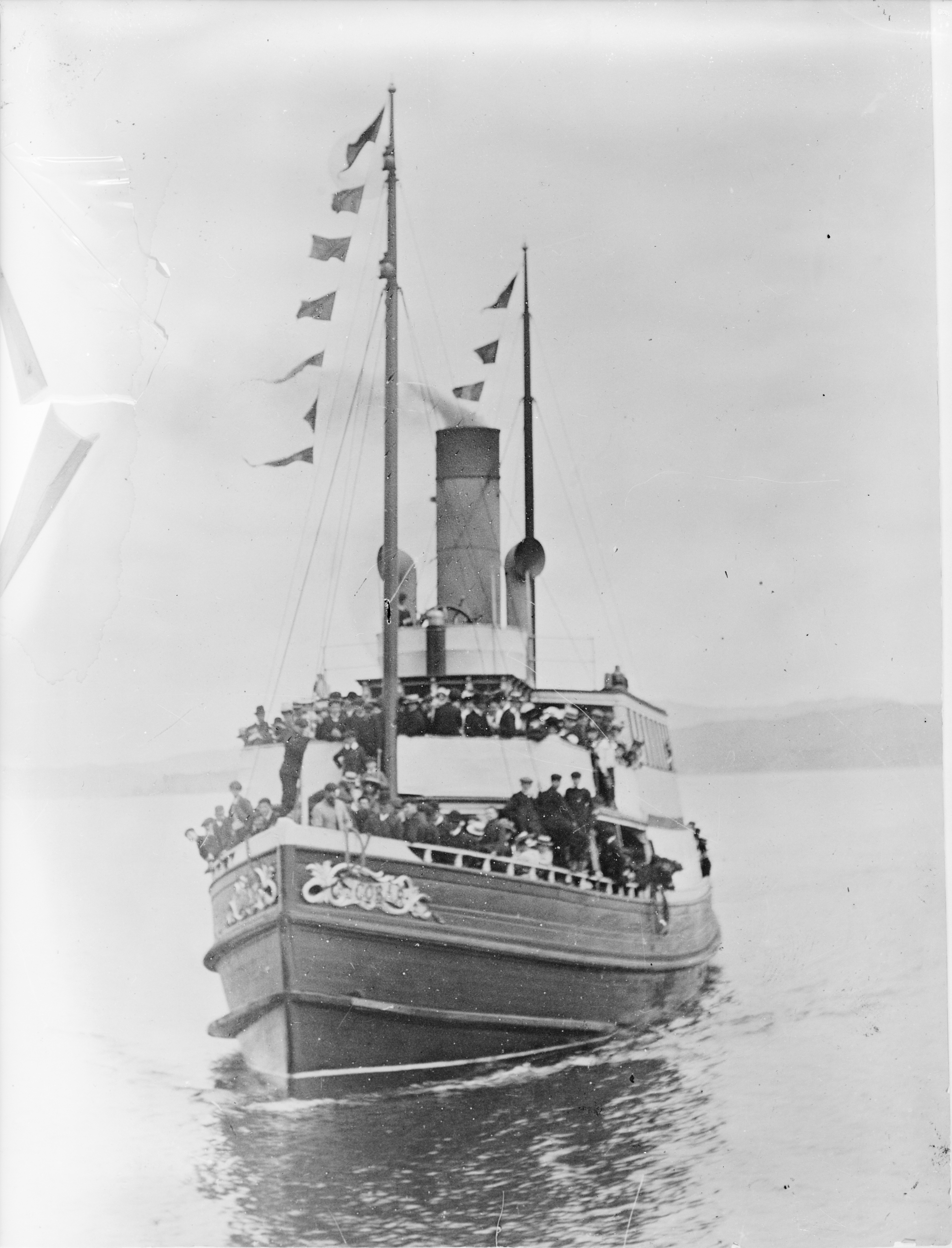
SS Cobar moves alongside Day's Bay wharf before her 1910 collision.

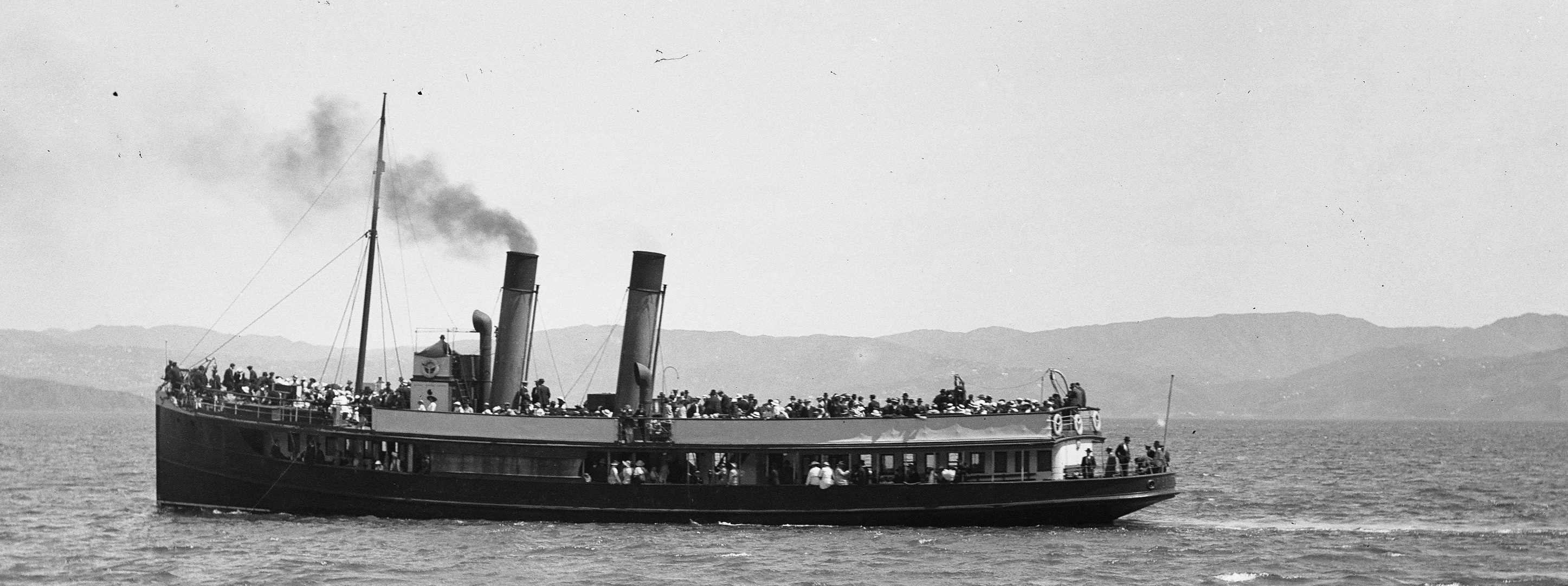
S S Duchess crossing Day's Bay in about 1910

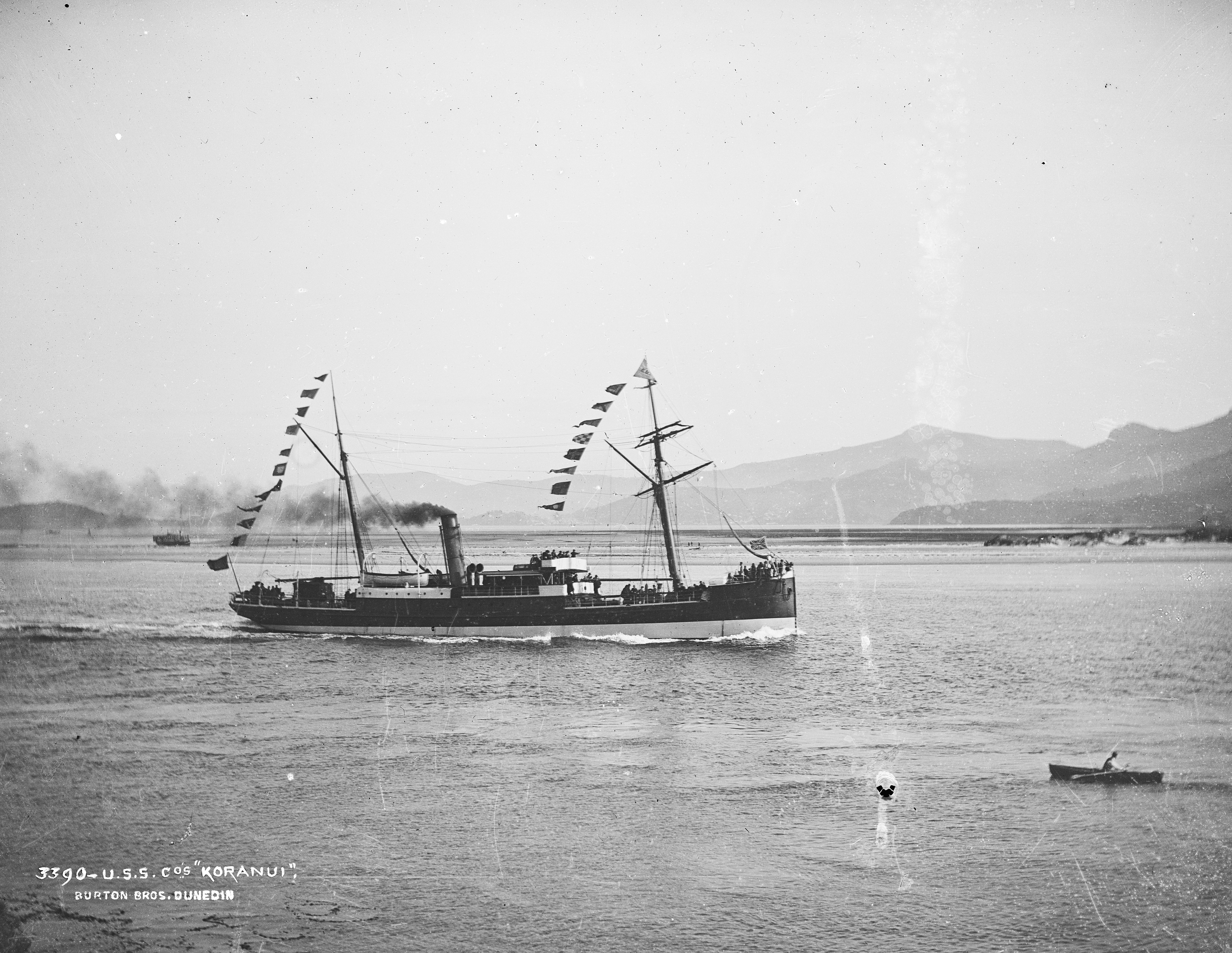
Collier Koranui passing Taiaroa Heads under the Union Steam Ship flag.

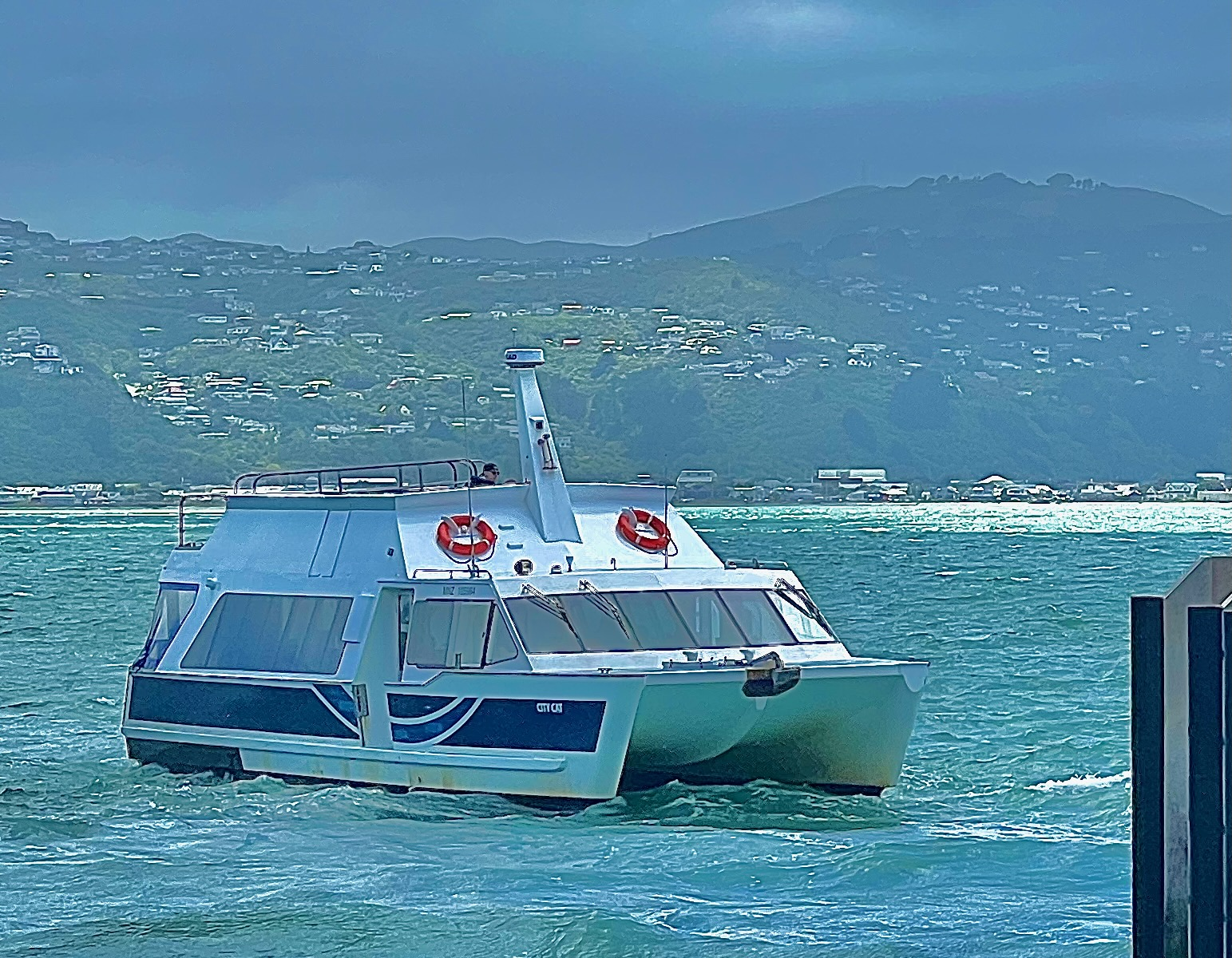
City Cat, built in 1995, off Matiu / Somes wharf

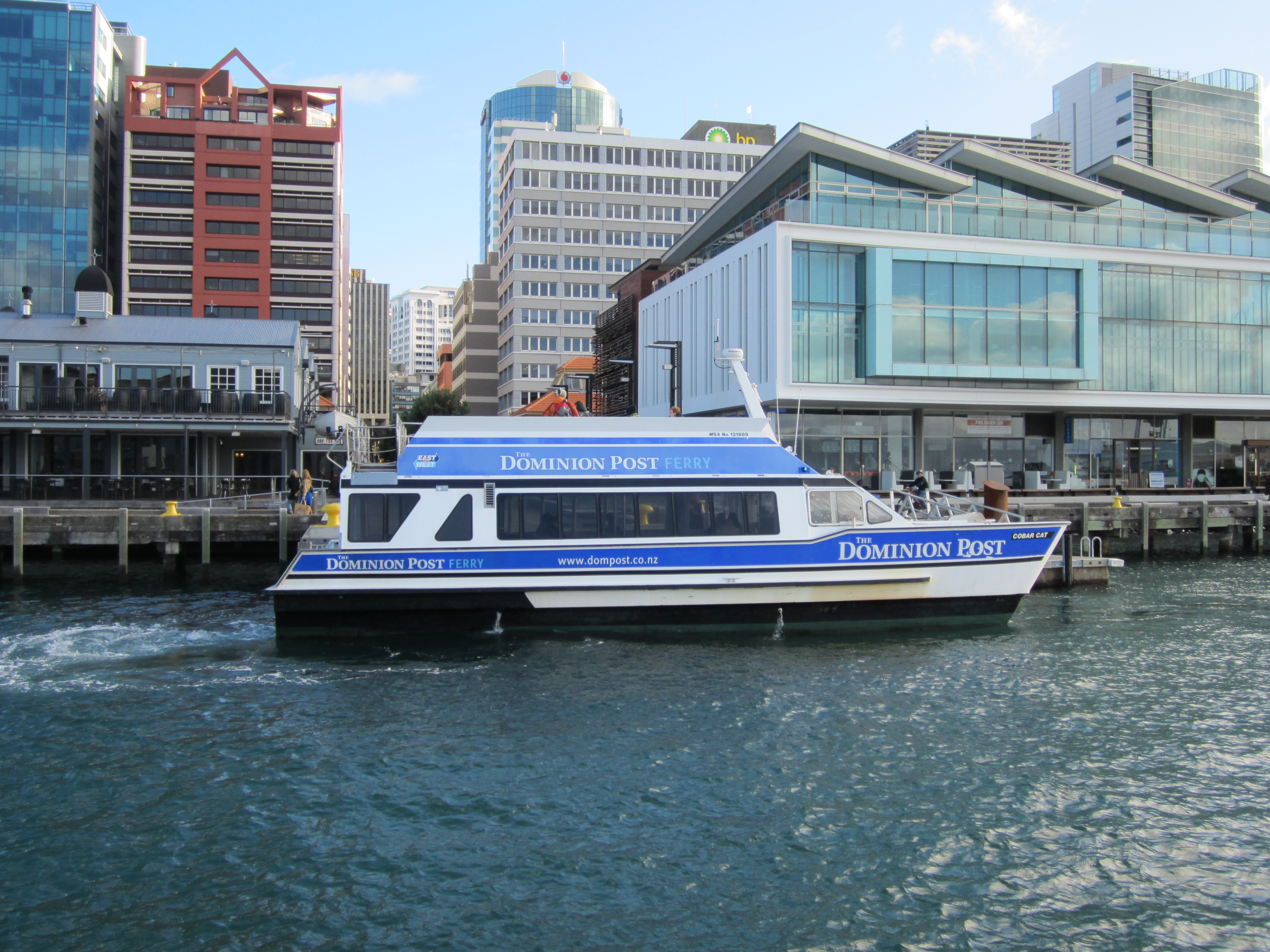
The ferry Cobar Cat at Queens Wharf

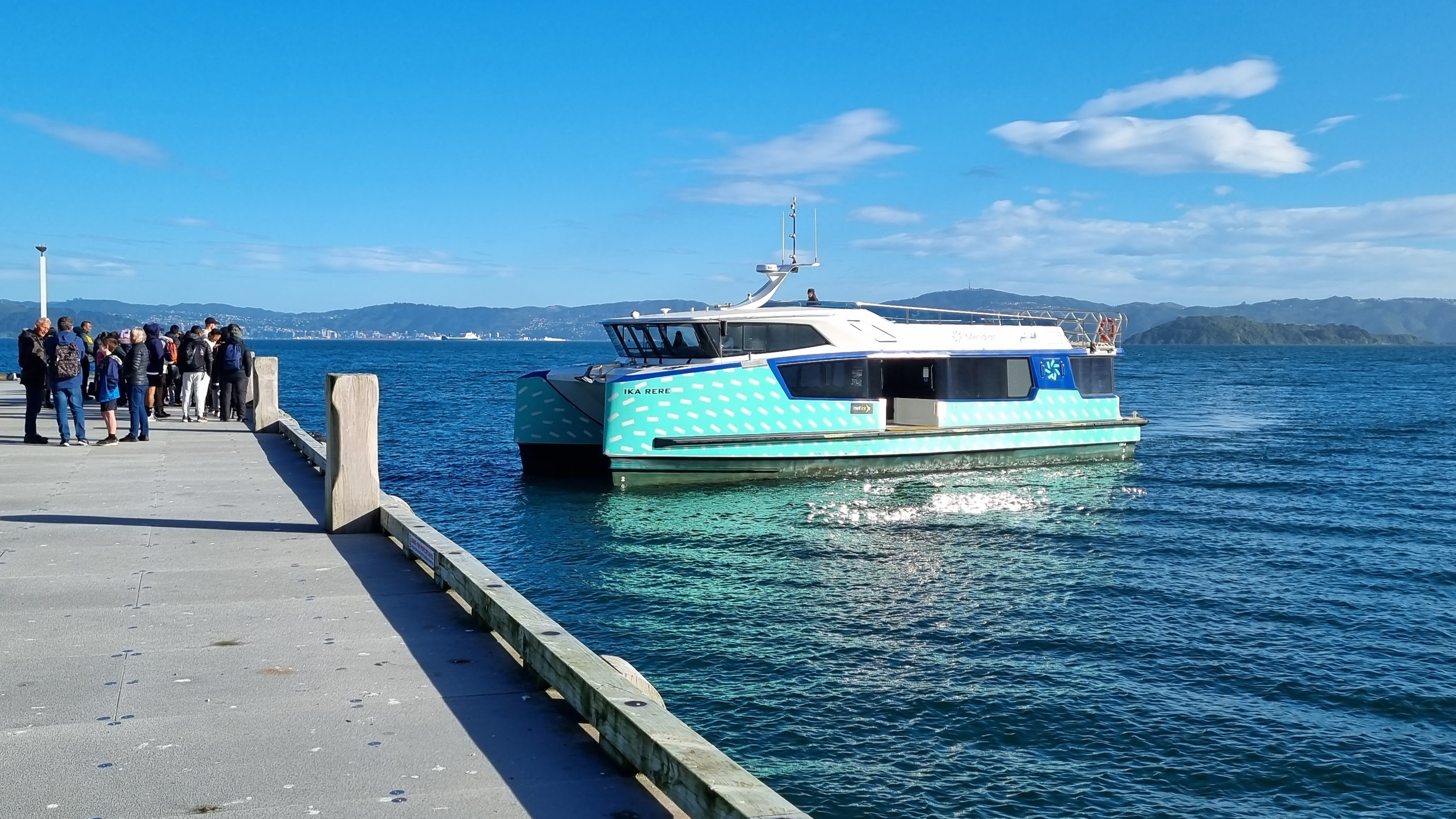
East by West's electric ferry Ika Rere approaching Days Bay Wharf to collect passengers.

== Owners and operators of steamers ==
=== Captain WR Williams ===
William Robert Williams (1832–1890) was born at Gravesend, England, 5 March 1832 and died at his house on Wellington's The Terrace on 17 March 1890. He started out to be a sailor at the age of 12 in vessels trading on the English coast. Moving to Australia in 1856 he involved himself in trade between Melbourne and ports in South Australia then became chief officer on a vessel running to Otago. He acquired an interest in the barque Anne Melhuish in which he brought coal to New Zealand from Newcastle taking timber, kauri gum, and, at the end of the Māori wars, troops the other way. The trans-Tasman coal trade was very profitable. He was soon able to purchase Heversham, Australind, Cyrus, Edwin Bassett, Carlotta, Neptune, Robin Hood, Sophia R Luhrs, G M Tucker, Ellerton, and Mary Bannatyne all forming the nucleus of the Black Diamond Line.

In 1876 he bought the steamer Grafton in Sydney and in 1881 while in England he bought the steamer Westport then being built in Glasgow. The following year, his only son, J. H. Williams, superintended the construction of steamers Koranui and Mawhera in Britain also for the West Coast trade. Other steam vessels belonging to the line were Moa, Manawatu, and Maitai.

Captain Williams moved into coal mining in 1885 forming a company to work a coal lease at Westport then adding the Koranui Coal Company and the Coal Pit Heath mine. However, in 1886, Williams disposed of them to Westport Coal Company and sold his vessels to Union Steam Ship Company (the "Southern Octopus"). He had intended to pay another visit to the Old Country but was found to be suffering from heart disease.

Described as a shrewd man of business he was at one time the largest employer of labour in Wellington. As well as running his line of steamers, he had his shipbuilding yard on the Te Aro foreshore, its site is now on the north side of Halley's Lane in lower Taranaki Street. For some years he was the government's nominee on the Wellington Harbour Board. His obituary in Wellington's Evening Post reported "Although occasionally brusque in his manner Captain Williams possessed a kindly disposition and his acts of benevolence were numerous."

=== JH Williams ===
James Herbert Williams (c. 1858–1915), the son of Captain WR Williams, was for many years connected with his father's business. The younger Williams subsequently acquired the local tug and ferry service which he conducted for a number of years. It eventually developed into the Wellington Steam Ferry Company which developed Day's Bay Estate into a popular resort. Williams died at Thorndon, on 19 January 1915. J. H. Williams held the piloting and tugboat contract at Wellington between 1894 and 1899 with the tugs Duco and Mana. In 1900 he sold his business including the resort of Days Bay to his Wellington Steam Ferry Company.

=== Wellington Steam Ferry Company ===
Incorporated 1900 (J. H. Williams, manager E. G. F. Zohrab). Williams sold his interest in 1905 to William Watson's syndicate and the company became a subsidiary of Watson's newly formed Wellington Harbour Ferries.

=== Miramar Ferry Company ===
Incorporated 1901, plant to Wellington Harbour Ferries in 1906.

=== Wellington Harbour Ferries ===
Incorporated 1906 by (Wm. Watson (1846–1938), president of the Bank of New Zealand, and other Seatoun residents, manager E. G. F. Zohrab) to own a controlling share of Wellington Steam Ferry Company and the plant from Miramar Ferry. In 1913, the ferries were sold to the Eastbourne Borough Council, Day's Bay House to Miss Sommerville, the remaining Day's Bay land was bought by Wellington City Council and the companies were eventually wound up.

=== E. G. F. Zohrab ===
Zohrab (1871–1933). When the council took over Duchess and Cobar in 1913 he took over Admiral, Karaka, and Pilot using them for towing and general work about the harbour but he ran no ferry services, leaving Karaka Bay and Seatoun without any ferry service at all.

=== Eastbourne Borough Council ===
The council committed themselves to the purchase of two vessels on 26 June 1913 and took over Duchess and Cobar on 1 September 1913. The timetable was increased and the service made more convenient for East Harbour residents. In 1923 the council purchased Muritai but it proved an expensive vessel to run. The paving of the Hutt Road and the extension of the bitumen to Muritai lowered ferry custom and the council was obliged to buy a fleet of buses. Duchess was sold in 1934. Muritai was taken over for Defence purposes in August 1940. Cobar was badly damaged by fire in 1948 and sold for a trawler in 1950. Cobar replacement Ocean Cruiser proved unreliable and did not attract the hoped-for custom.

== See also ==
- Interislander for Cook Strait ferries from Wellington to Picton
