= Days Bay =

Suburb of Lower Hutt, New Zealand

Days Bay Oruamatoro (Māori)
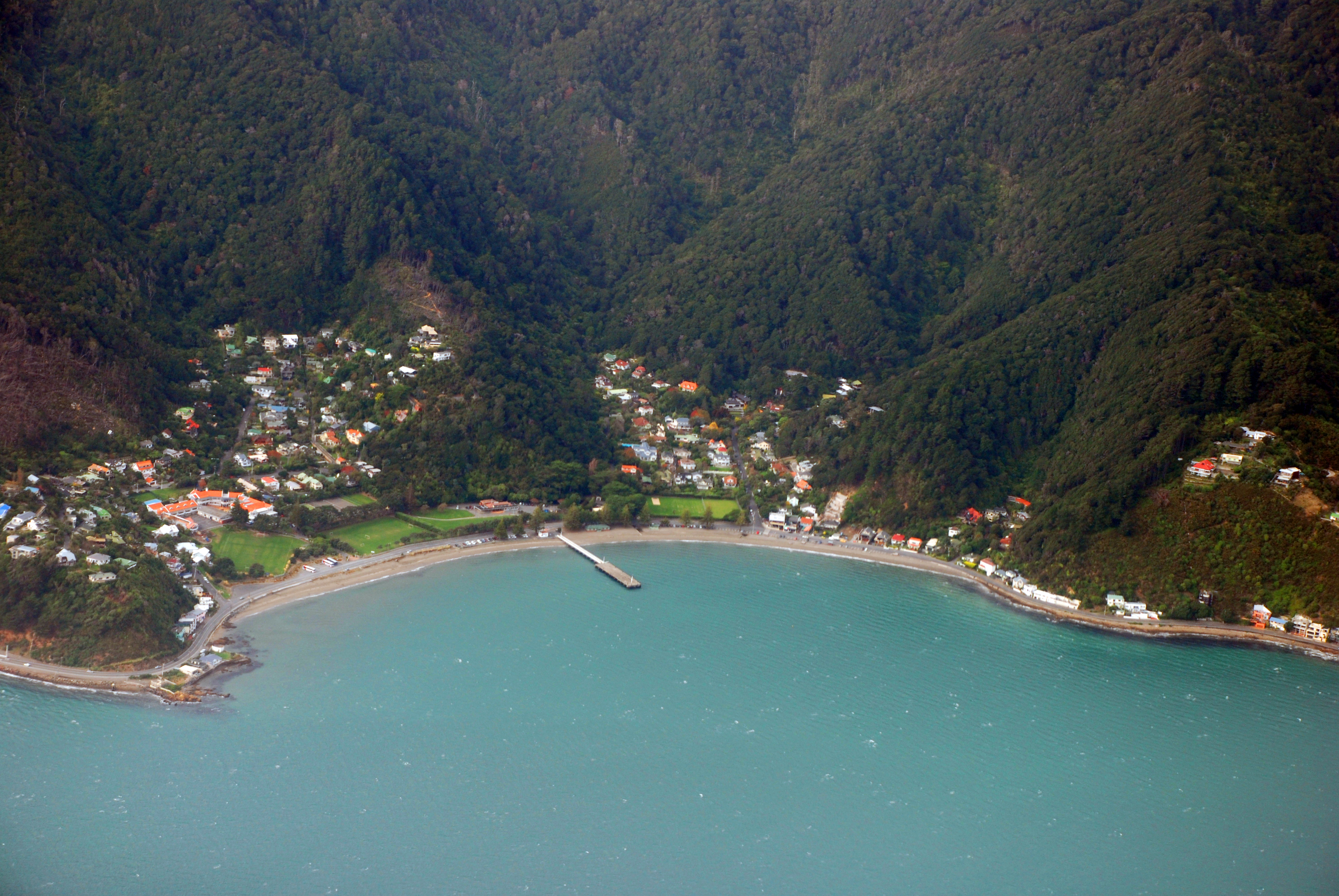
- Days Bay in 2007
- Interactive map of Days Bay
- Coordinates: 41.2816°S 174.9068°E
- Country: New Zealand
- Region: Wellington Region
- Territorial authority: Lower Hutt
- Ward: Harbour
- Community board: Eastbourne Community Board
- Electorates: Hutt South; Ikaroa-Rāwhiti (Māori)

Government
  - Territorial Authority: Hutt City Council
  - Regional council: Greater Wellington Regional Council
  - Mayor of Lower Hutt: Ken Laban
  - Hutt South MP: TBD
  - Ikaroa-Rāwhiti MP: Cushla Tangaere-Manuel

Area
  - Total: 0.49 km^{2} (0.19 sq mi)

Population (2018 Census)
  - Total: 597
  - Density: 1,200/km^{2} (3,200/sq mi)

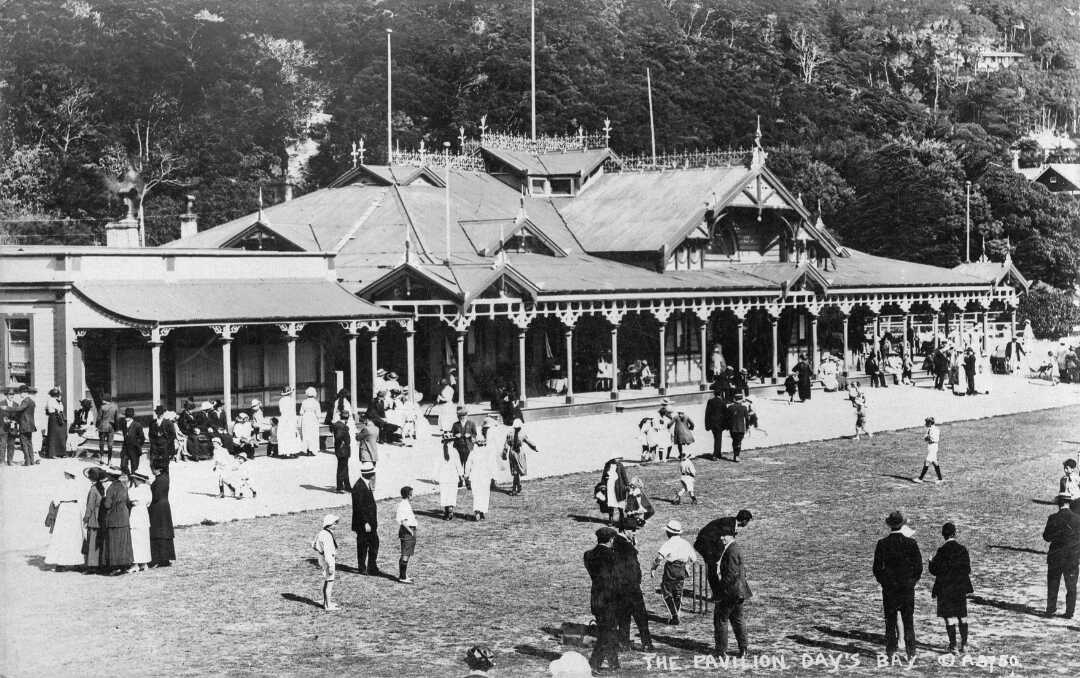
Day's Bay Pavilion opened November 1897

Days Bay (Māori: Oruamatoro) is a residential area in Lower Hutt in the Wellington Region of the North Island of New Zealand. It is walled on three sides by steep bush-clad slopes. Most of its level land is occupied by the 6.5-hectare Williams Park and an independent boys' primary school, originally a part of Williams Park. Wellington shipowner, J H Williams, bought land in Days Bay near the end of the 19th century to create custom for his smaller vessels, building a wharf and turning the bay into a sports and resort development for day-trippers and holiday-makers. Williams sold his interest in 1905 and the new owners split off building sites on unneeded land. The Eastbourne Borough Council bought the ferries in 1913 and the accommodation, Days Bay House, was sold to Wellington's Croydon School. The following year the Wellington City Council with central government support and public subscription bought the resort for the benefit of the public though without its accommodation and, in view of the large cash contribution by the founder's mother, named it Williams Park.

Days Bay's ornate wooden late-Victorian Pavilion, providing teas on its deep verandahs, a restaurant, evening dances and outdoor concerts (Note: "The plans drawn by Mr W C Chatfield . . . chief internal feature will be a magnificent salon measuring 100 ft (30,480 mm) long, 40 ft (12,192 mm) wide 25 ft (7,620 mm) high from floor to apex of roof . . . will be available either as a luncheon room or as a hall for entertainments or dancing . . . will open on to a splendid verandah 16 ft (4,877 mm) wide running along the whole of the front and both sides of the building . . . a large lantern in the roof will give plenty of light . . . a band gallery above the entrance . . . lighted by electricity". The Evening Post, 28 June 1897, page 4) was very popular until it was totally destroyed by an early Sunday morning fire in October 1952. It was eventually replaced by a small building. Better road access was achieved, a bus service provided and the ferries lost custom and Williams Park lost some of its visitors. Suburban electric trains up the west coast and the rise of private cars in the second half of the 20th century opened new options for Wellingtonians.

Since public ownership in 1914, aside from the maturing of trees, no waterslide and a new small pavilion, more than a century has elapsed and Williams Park has changed little.

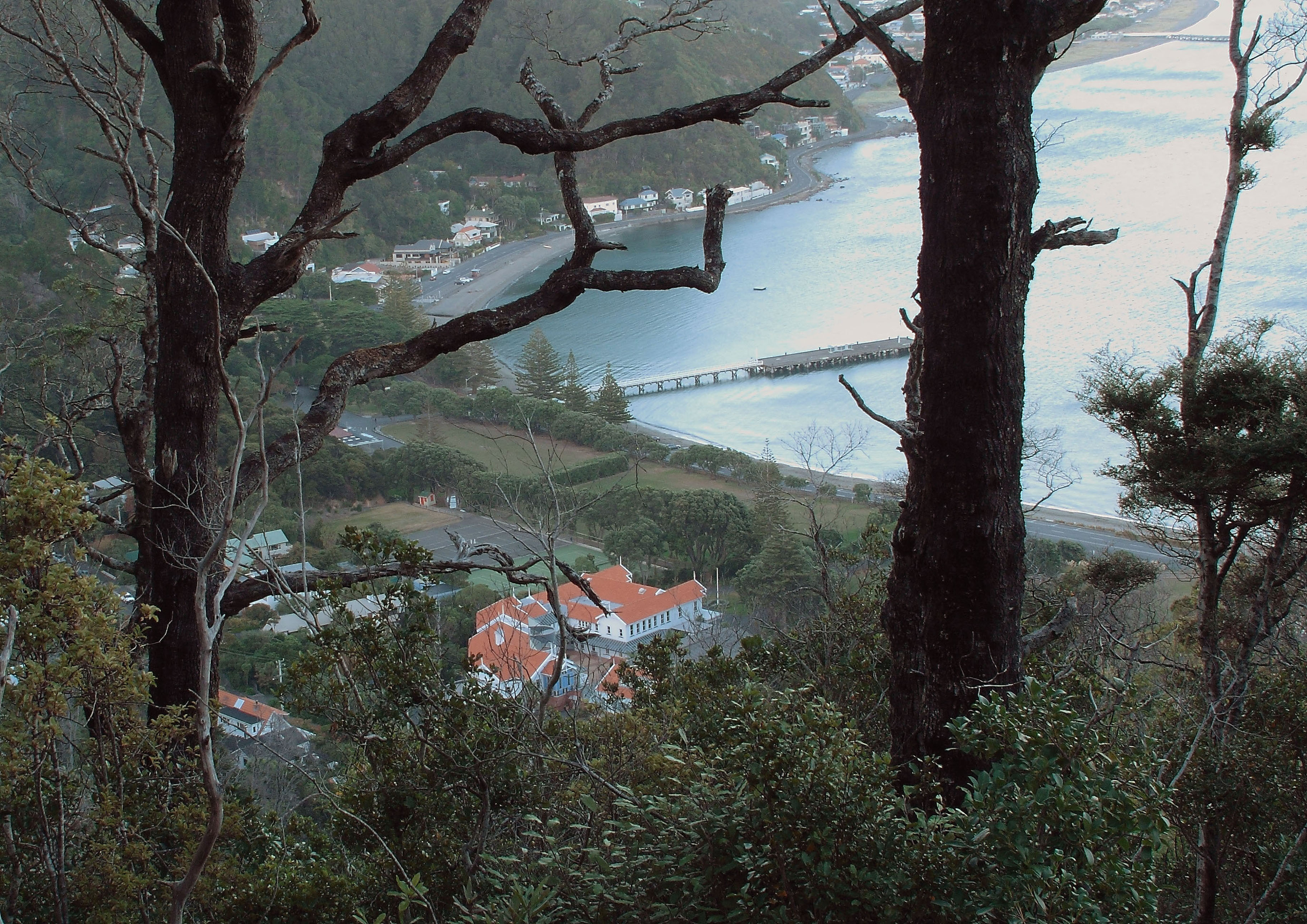
Days Bay, early morning April 2010, the most distant of the orange tile roofs is the Day's Bay House building

== Māori settlement ==
The original Māori name for Days Bay was Oruamatoro. This was a Ngati Ira fortified village "built by Te Hiha six generations ago" (as of 1865).

== European settlement ==
Days Bay was at first known to settlers as Hawtrey Bay. It was settled by George Day and his family who had immigrated from Kent aboard the Arab in 1841. A William Tod appears to have employed George Day to look after his interests in the area while he went south. They had permission to cut and sell firewood and timber. The Days built their house in the bay and operated a schooner that ferried early settlers between the Hutt Valley and Wellington. After their house was severely damaged by an earthquake in November 1849 the Day family left the bay aboard the schooner Flirt, captained by their eldest son George Frederick Day, and sailed to Lyttelton in Canterbury, the port for the new settlement of Christchurch. By December 1849 the family had settled in Sumner and George Day had become a road construction overseer, while the rest of the family appears to have continued their firewood, timber and shipping activities.

== Destination resort ==
A destination resort is a self-contained development that provides for visitor-oriented accommodations and developed recreational facilities in a setting with high natural amenities.

J H Williams a Wellington ship owner and son of another prosperous Wellington ship owner like some other owners ran excursions to Lowry Bay in a work boat dressed for the day in flags and bunting. They were popular with church groups, employees out for their annual company picnic and the like as well as the general public. Lowry Bay's wharf was becoming unsound and at the end of the 1880s Williams rebuilt it at his own expense. A refreshment booth was organised, playground equipment was brought in for young children and races and other activities set up for the older ones and the excursions became a great success. Williams' income came from carrying the people to Lowry Bay and not from their activities once on dry land. Wanting to participate in the takings from those shore activities he took an opportunity in November 1894 to buy the principal 125 acres section of beachfront in Days Bay, got permission to build a wharf and had the rest of the Bay surveyed. Twelve months later his wharf was finished though he ran his first excursion there the month before on 9 October 1895.

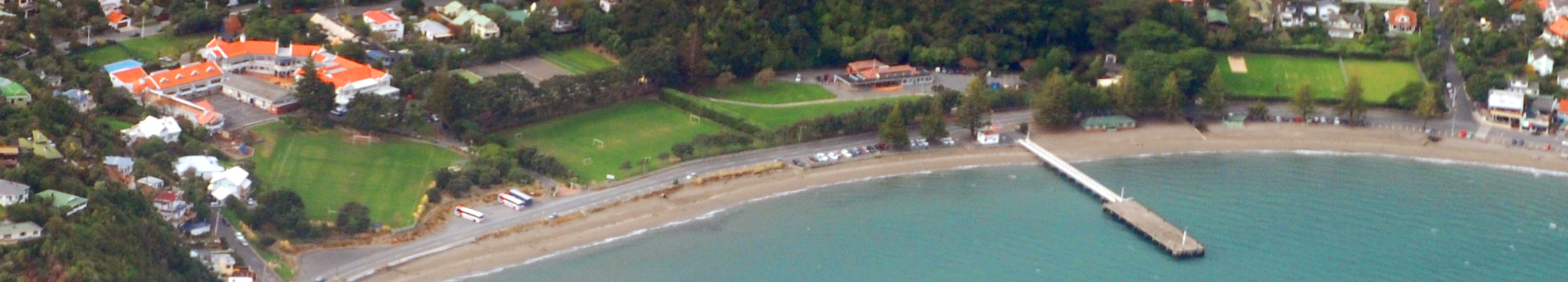
Williams' resort 2007. Days Bay House and at one time hockey at the left through, croquet (built over), hard tennis courts, a sports field, the now much reduced pavilion, petanque and over to tennis on the right.

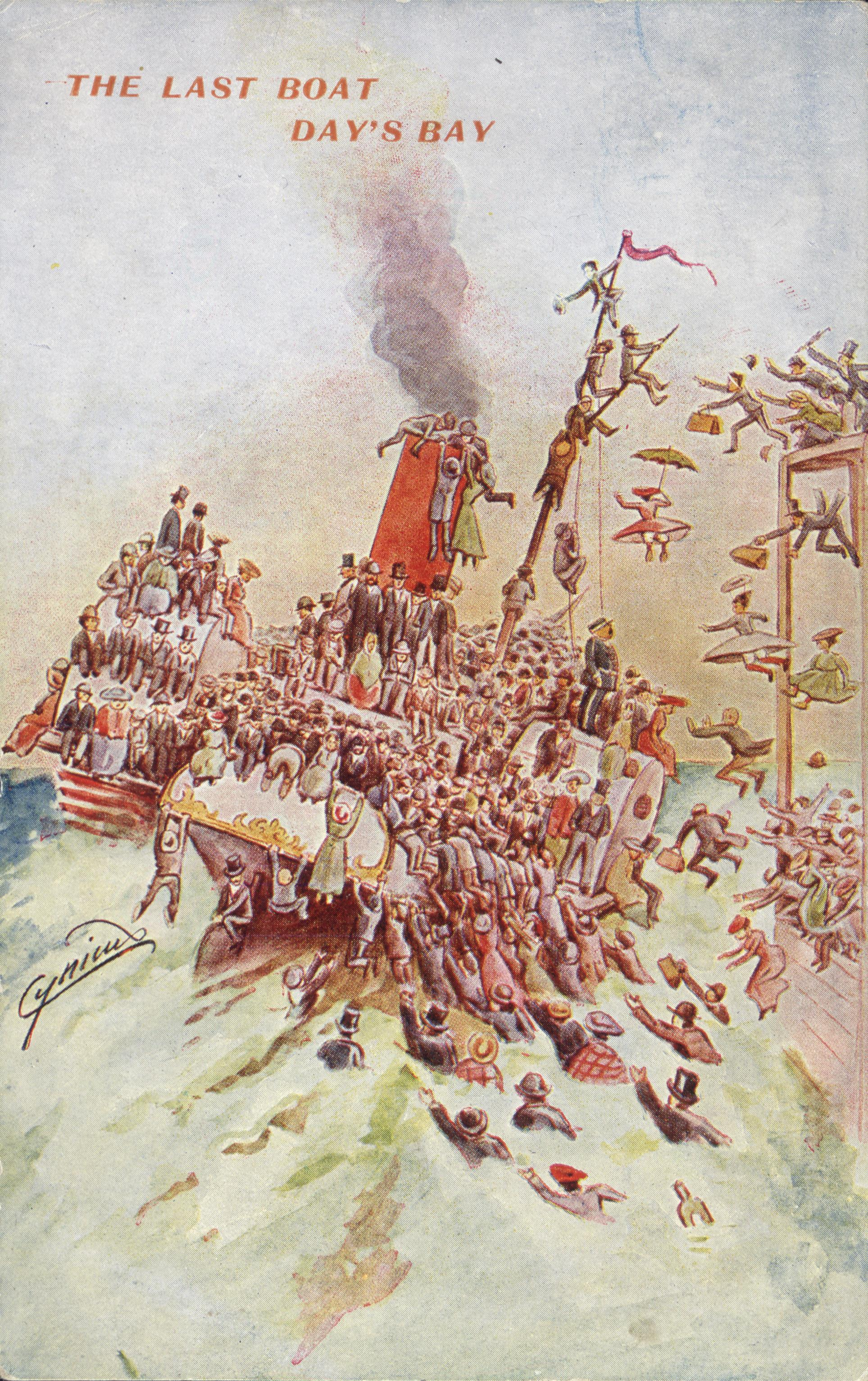
The last boat home c. 1910

In November 1896 the Evening Post reported steamers Duco and Mana were unable to take all who wished to go to Day's Bay. The following winter Williams bought a further 700 acres of land by York Bay and Day's Bay including 200 acres in Portuguese Joe Bay. Days Bay (the prettiest spot in the harbour) was always ready for business and rapidly proved so popular the Chief Post Office by Queens Wharf undertook to a fly a flag to signal there would be no postponement of the day's harbour trip. Large wharf gates—since removed—had to be put up at Days Bay to control the crowds as well as barricades and at the city end the Wellington Harbour Board felt obliged to build a special Ferry Wharf—finished by autumn 1897—otherwise the swarms of trippers created real difficulties at their Queens Wharf. Newspaper reports of as many as six shark fins at once in the warmer waters of the eastern harbour and infestations of venomous katipō spiders in rotten wood on Day's Bay's high tide mark did not deter them. Donkey rides were there on the beach by 1901.

These excursions were not on a regular schedule but fitted between the everyday commitments of Williams’ vessels. Generally passengers were carried by Duco which also performed tugboat duties but at the end of 1897 the specially designed and built for Williams, licensed for 1,029 passengers, electrically lit steamer Duchess arrived from her builders in Glasgow. It was the harbour's first glimpse of her twin-funnelled passenger liner profile.

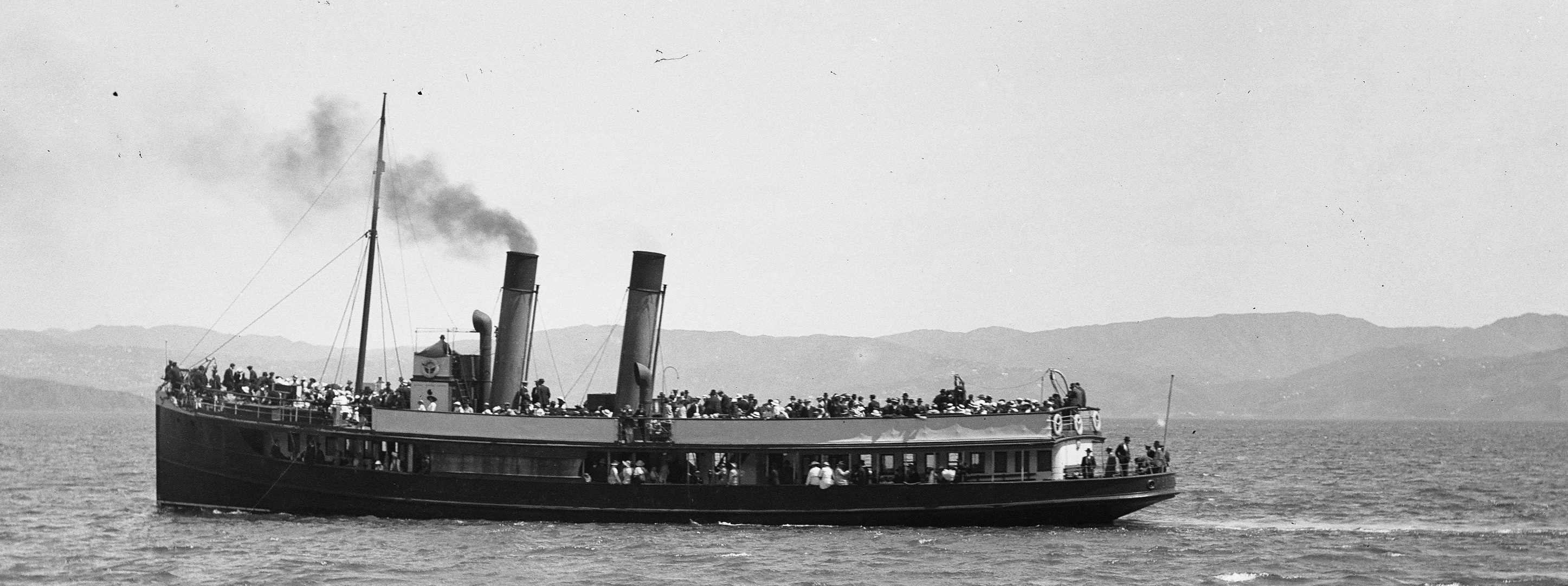
s s Duchess in Day's Bay circa 1910

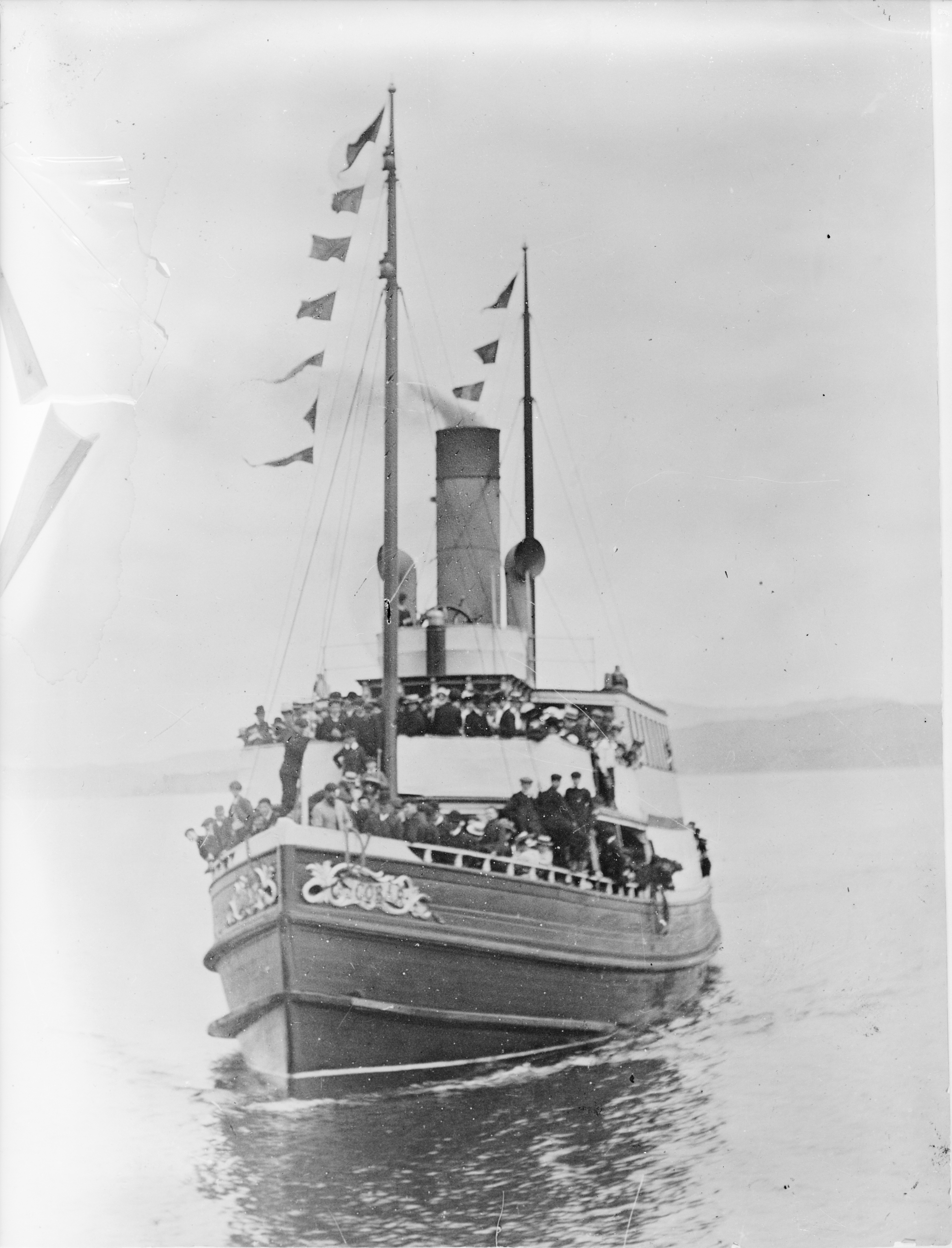
s s Cobar arriving at Day's Bay wharf

=== Property developers ===
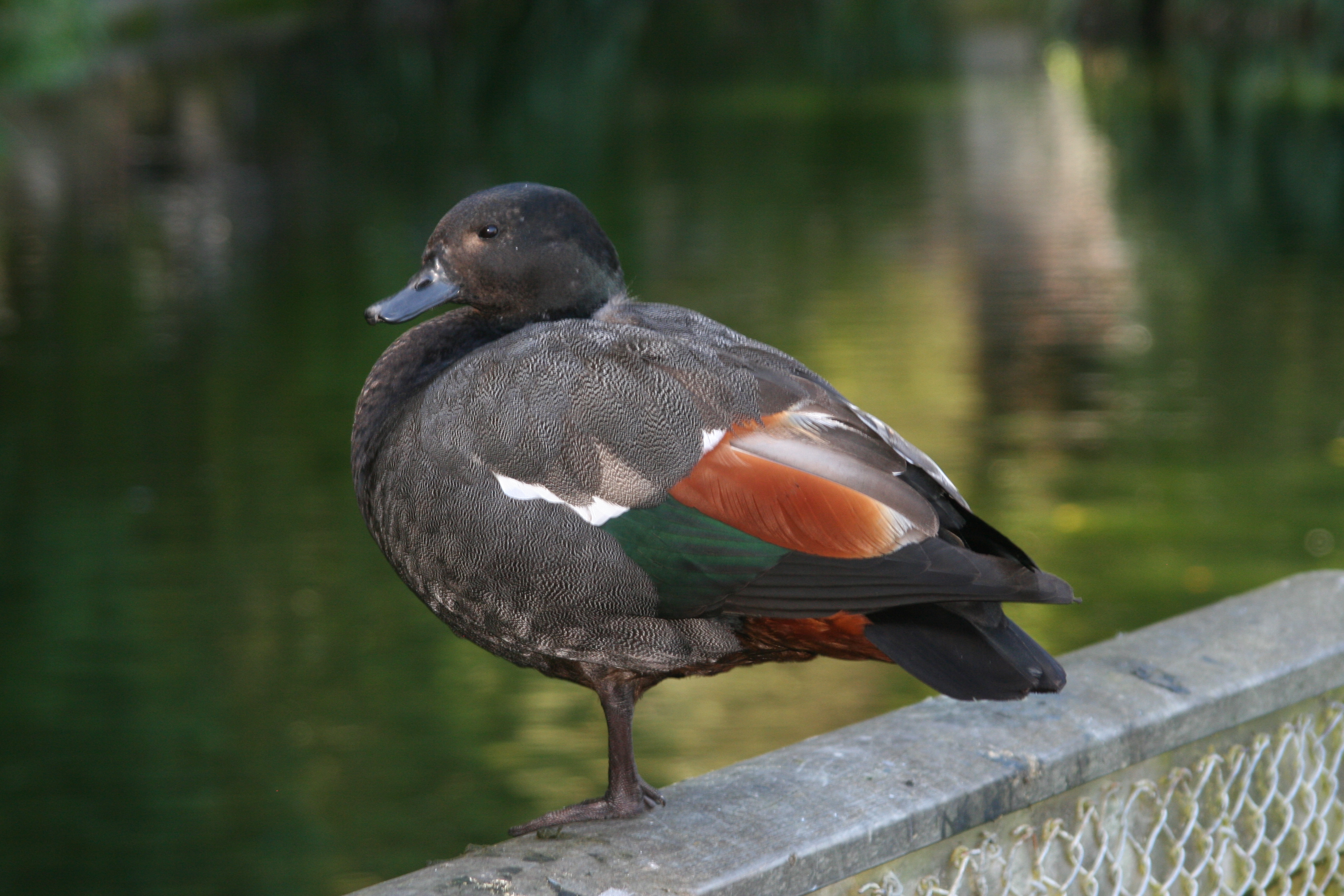
Sheldrake on the old water chute pond, 2010

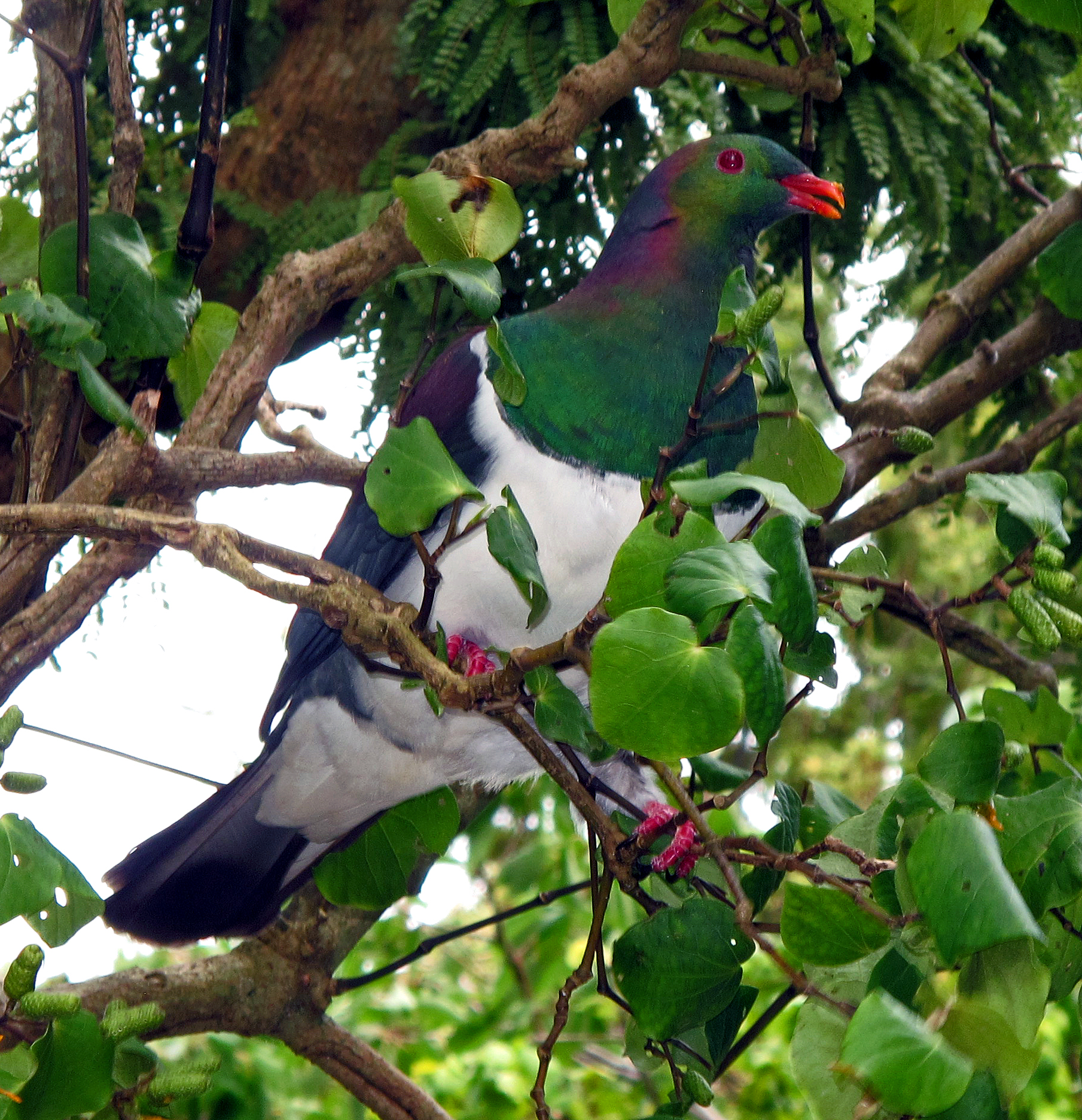
Kererū in Day's Bay, 2012

Then after seven more good years Williams became concerned that in 1909, only four years away, his lease of his Day's Bay wharf would expire. He had put ten successful years work into Day's Bay. The Evening Post reported about 4000 had visited Days Bay on Anniversary Day 1905. His real pleasure was in running his resort and finding extra work for his commercial vessels in their slack times. By 1905 there was less commercial work available. The Union Company had bought two tugs for its own operations and there were other smaller competitors. A wharf had been built at Rona Bay and building sites were being sold. The usual civic institutions were beginning to take root in the neighbourhood, initially an unelected group calling themselves The Day's Bay Ratepayers Association. Properly constituted they would see a useful tax source in his business and in any case he did not want to run a scheduled commuter ferry service to please permanent residents.

Williams had successfully floated Wellington Steam Ferry Company Limited in 1900, a public listed company, and put his own business into its ownership. That way he raised enough extra capital to improve and expand the resort's facilities and acquire another ferry. He now put his share of Wellington Steam Ferry and its 226 acres of Day's Bay up for sale and in August 1905 it was bought by a syndicate led by William Watson of the Bank of New Zealand. Wellington Steam Ferry became a subsidiary of Watson's newly formed Wellington Harbour Ferries Limited.

Within a month an auction of 66 building sites was advertised. It seemed all Wellington protested. Harold Beauchamp, father of Katherine Mansfield appealed to the Premier, Richard Seddon, for the Government to acquire Days Bay and proclaim it a National Park "for all time". (Note: "It has been proposed to acquire under the Scenery Preservation Act the native bush at Day's Bay. A petition is now in circulation praying the Government to acquire not only the bush, but the whole of the Ferry Company's Day's Bay estate. The petition reads:— "To the Right Hon. the Premier, Wellington, — We the undersigned residents of Eastbourne and Wellington. . . Desire to impress upon you the fact that this estate is eminently suitable for a park and recreation reserve, while the hydro establishment and pavilion, which have been erected thereon at an outlay of about £15,000, will give an immediate return to the State, and become an interest earning factor, which, we suggest, would weigh with the Government when deciding for or against the acquisition of the same."" —The Evening Post) He suggested maintenance costs then would be funded by the rents from the accommodation house and pavilion and an agreed portion of the ferry company's fares. No government help was forthcoming.

After the uproar abated the auction went ahead. Wellington Harbour Ferries found revenue enough to maintain the ferry service but wanted the profits from more subdivision in Day's Bay. Its focus became property development, it had a ferry service to make the properties attractive. It lost Miramar business when trams arrived and, as expected by Williams, Harbour Board and Eastbourne Borough Council both pushed up wharf rentals. Duco was sent to the Chathams to fish and earn cash but disappeared with all hands. The council would not buy the bush-clad slopes for a reserve. The Council demanded they be allowed to buy the ferries.

=== Eastbourne's access ===
Eastbourne Borough Council committed themselves to their purchase on 26 June and took over Duchess and Cobar on 1 September 1913. The timetable was increased and the service made more convenient for East Harbour residents. In 1923 the council purchased Muritai but it proved an expensive vessel to run. The paving of the Hutt Road and the extension of the bitumen to Muritai lowered ferry custom and the council was obliged to buy a fleet of buses. Duchess was sold in 1934. Muritai was taken over for Defence purposes in August 1940. Cobar was badly damaged by fire in 1948 and sold for a trawler in 1950. Cobar replacement Ocean Cruiser, a stripped Fairmile with a puny stand-in for its three V12 petrol engines, proved unreliable and did not attract the hoped-for custom.

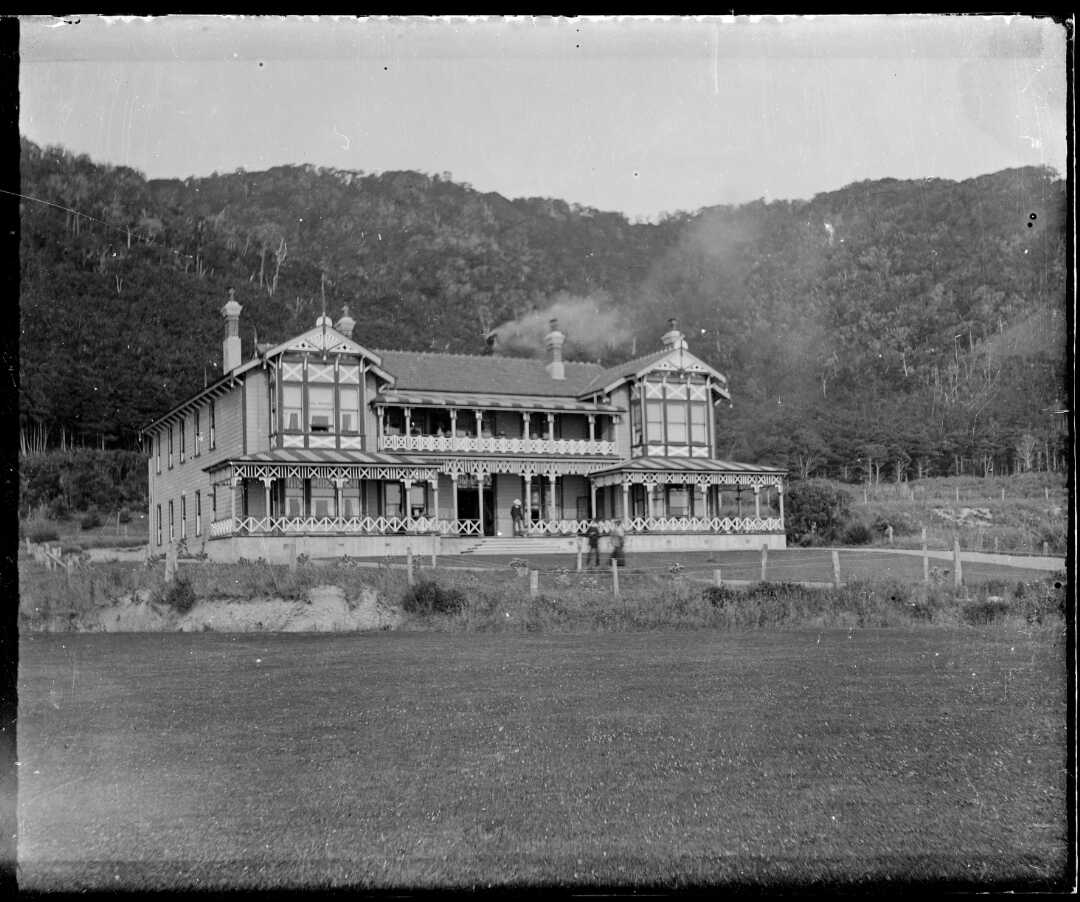
Day's Bay House soon after it was built

=== Days Bay House ===
Day's Bay House was built in 1903 for J H Williams's Wellington Steam Ferry Company. The resort hotel operation met with only moderate success and in 1913 with its immediate surrounds, 4 acres, it was sold to Miss Gladys Sommerville and building and grounds became Croydon School.

=== Williams Park ===
When the resort without hotel became available at the end of 1913 once again strong public pressure arose for the Government or Wellington City Council to buy it. Having no satisfaction from these organisations a Citizens' Committee was formed and it called for donations. Much the largest were from the Government, £4,000 and the Wellington City Council —the same amount—and from Mrs W R Williams, widowed mother of the park's founder, J H Williams.

The Wellington City Council announced on 11 March 1914 that councillors had visited and inspected the land in Days Bay and after a special meeting in the evening in committee resolved to buy it on the terms submitted by the deputation of citizens and the vendors. The foreshore rights vested in the company would now vest in the Wellington City Council.

Mrs W R Williams was given a copy of the following resolution by the council: "That this council place on record its deep sense of the public spirit manifested by Mrs W R Williams in contributing a sum of £1,500 towards the fund for the purchase of the Day's Bay grounds for public purposes and in recognition of her generosity hereby resolves that the reserve shall henceforth be known as Williams Park".

== Day's Bay ferry vessels ==
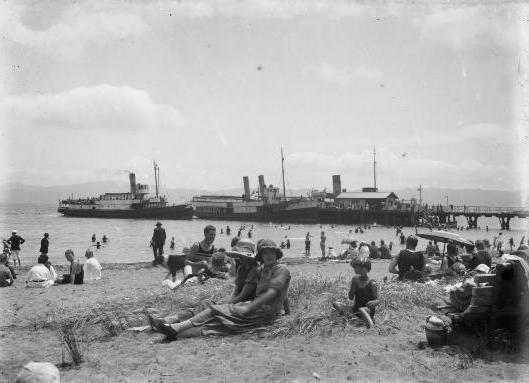
Cobar, Duchess and a third ferry
Days Bay, 1920s

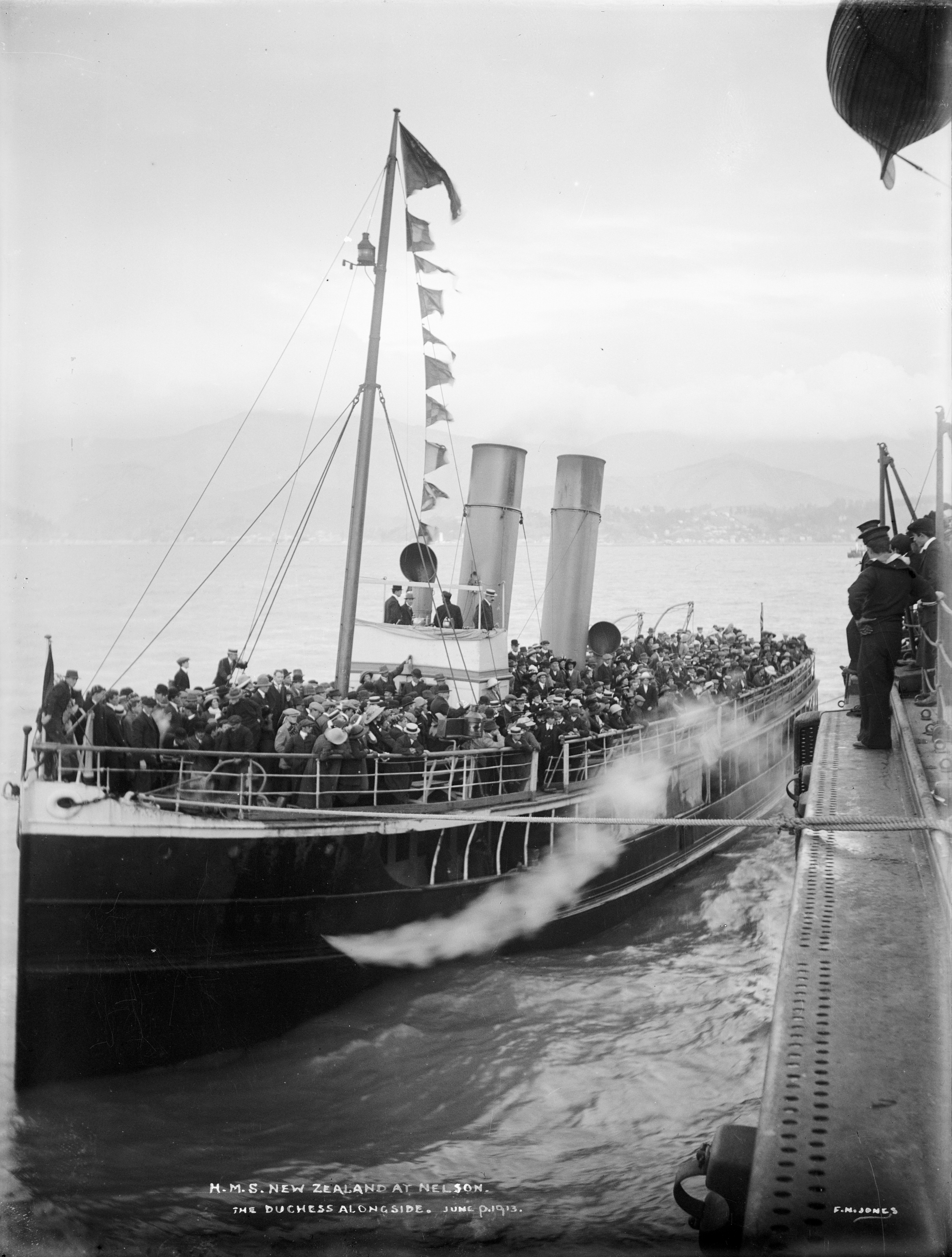
s s Duchess on a weekend excursion to Nelson

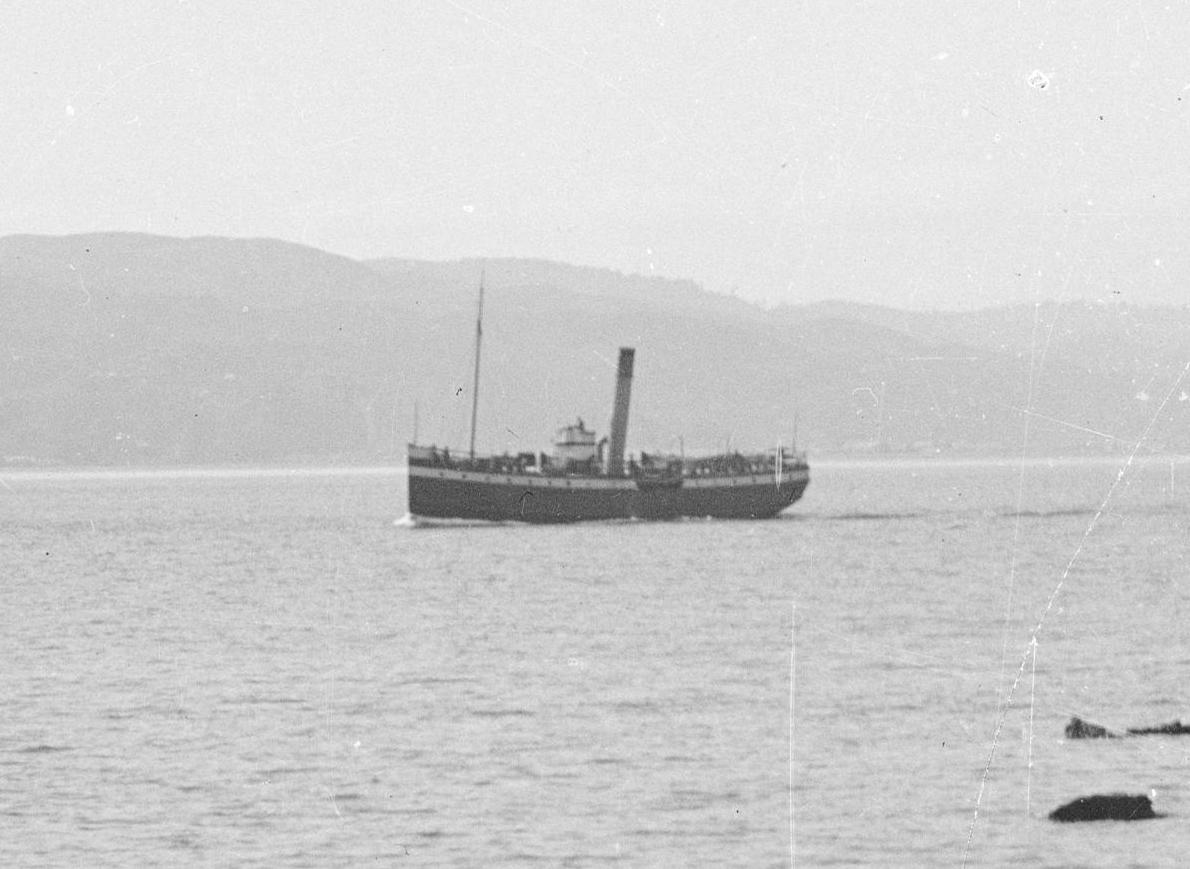
s s Countess in front of Oriental Bay

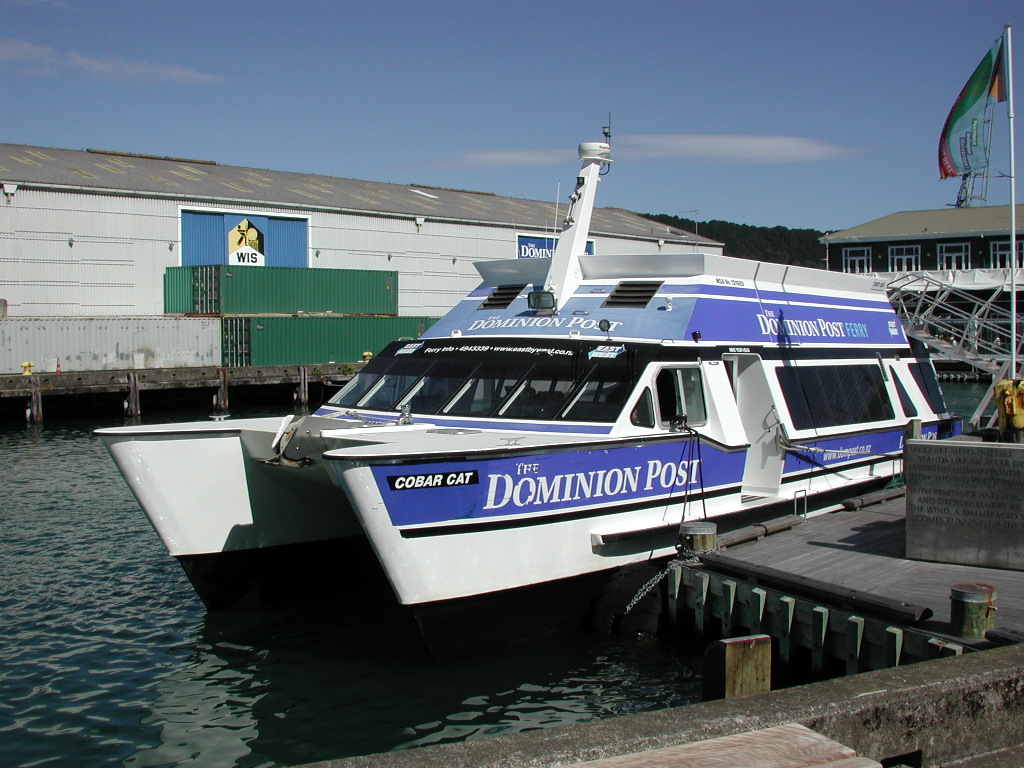
Cobar Cat, Queen's Wharf, 2007

== Local bodies ==
=== The district ===
For a long time the ferries also enjoyed the commuter traffic that found the road intolerable. The whole far or eastern side of the harbour had become known as Eastbourne by the turn of the 19th to 20th century but it was still referred to as the-district-round-about-Day's-Bay. Modern Eastbourne was then Rona Bay (within) Day's Bay and its broader neighbour to its south, Muritai (within) Day's Bay, both accessible by Day's Bay steamer. That is to say Rona Bay (or Brown's Bay or Okiwi) and Muritai (or Robinson's Bay) were in Day's Bay and the province of the Day's Bay Ratepayers Association, a free association of like-minded residents and not an elected body. Some letters to The Evening Post described the Association as a coterie.

=== Eastbourne Borough Council ===
In the Spring of 1904 a bill was introduced to Parliament to constitute an Eastbourne Road District and a Road Board for it replacing the administration of the Hutt County Council. On its way through Parliament the idea became expanded into not just a roads board but a Borough Council. York Bay and Lowry Bay remained in Hutt County at the request of their residents as did, for the moment, Day's Bay. (Note: At the time, 1905, the new Council's permanent Eastbourne residents were believed to number 750 to 800 and summer residents up to 2,000. In fact the 1906 census reported the population of Eastbourne Borough to be 353. ref. Our Population. Evening Post| volume=LXXI| issue=120, 22 May 1906. In 1911 it was reported to have reached 559.) Rona Bay and Muritai became Eastbourne. The first meeting of the new Eastbourne Borough Council was set down for 8 June 1906. By the time of the first World War Williams Park's location was firmly Day's Bay, Eastbourne but civic administration remained separate from Eastbourne and there were complaints at the way Day's Bay in Hutt County took the bulk of the holiday traffic on Eastbourne's Ferries having made no contribution to their upkeep. Of course the visitors would have been just as happy to get off the boat at Rona Bay, there you could take your pick from wharf or sandy beach or if a fresh southerly sprang up, visit friends.

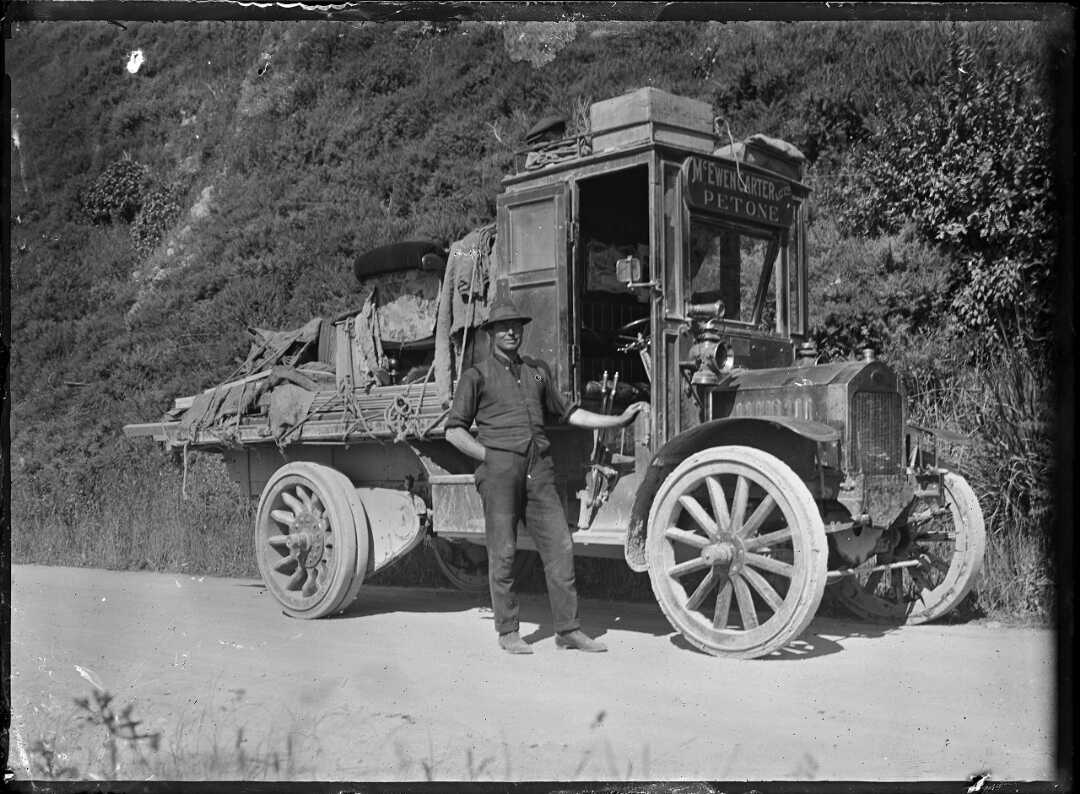
A McEwen's lorry on the summertime surface, 1916

There were four miles of road from the Waiwhetū Bridge to Days Bay. The Hutt County Council defended its practice "which is recognised good practice in road-making" of using a mix of gravel and sand on a muddy clay surface while admitting it was difficult to keep that surface in good condition in winter weather. The City and Suburban Highways Board took the road under their management in early 1926. It was intended to pave the road through Days Bay in late summer 1926 but there was a proposal for a subway to link the wharf and road entrance to the Pavilion. The subway was strongly and in the end successfully opposed by local residents and the paving in front of the park finally went ahead in 1927.

== Demographics ==
Days Bay covers 0.49 km^{2} (0.19 sq mi) It is part of the larger Eastern Bays statistical area.

Historal population for Days Bay
Year	Pop.	±% p.a.
2006	600	—
2013	576	−0.58%
2018	597	+0.72%
2023	570	−0.92%

Days Bay had a population of 570 in the 2023 New Zealand census, a decrease of 27 people (−4.5%) since the 2018 census, and a decrease of 6 people (−1.0%) since the 2013 census. There were 270 males, 288 females, and 6 people of other genders in 228 dwellings. 3.7% of people identified as LGBTIQ+. There were 84 people (14.7%) aged under 15 years, 66 (11.6%) aged 15 to 29, 300 (52.6%) aged 30 to 64, and 126 (22.1%) aged 65 or older.

People could identify as more than one ethnicity. The results were 94.7% European (Pākehā); 4.7% Māori; 1.1% Pasifika; 2.6% Asian; 1.1% Middle Eastern, Latin American and African New Zealanders (MELAA); and 3.2% other, which includes people giving their ethnicity as "New Zealander". English was spoken by 98.4%, Māori by 1.1%, and other languages by 16.8%. No language could be spoken by 1.6% (e.g. too young to talk). The percentage of people born overseas was 29.5, compared with 28.8% nationally.

Religious affiliations were 26.3% Christian, 1.6% Hindu, 1.1% Buddhist, and 0.5% other religions. People who answered that they had no religion were 63.7%, and 6.8% of people did not answer the census question.

Of those at least 15 years old, 276 (56.8%) people had a bachelor's or higher degree, 177 (36.4%) had a post-high school certificate or diploma, and 30 (6.2%) people exclusively held high school qualifications. 144 people (29.6%) earned over $100,000 compared to 12.1% nationally. The employment status of those at least 15 was 255 (52.5%) full-time, 87 (17.9%) part-time, and 3 (0.6%) unemployed.

=== Eastern Bays statistical area ===
Eastern Bays statistical area covers 1.93 km^{2} (0.75 sq mi) and includes several other bays between Days Bay and Point Howard. It had an estimated population of 1,990 as of June 2025, with a population density of 1,031 people per km^{2}.

Historical population for Eastern Bays
Year	Pop.	±% p.a.
2006	2,016	—
2013	1,944	−0.52%
2018	2,079	+1.35%
2023	1,986	−0.91%

Eastern Bays had a population of 1,986 in the 2023 New Zealand census, a decrease of 93 people (−4.5%) since the 2018 census, and an increase of 42 people (2.2%) since the 2013 census. There were 957 males, 1,017 females, and 12 people of other genders in 810 dwellings. 3.8% of people identified as LGBTIQ+. The median age was 51.5 years (compared with 38.1 years nationally). There were 273 people (13.7%) aged under 15 years, 234 (11.8%) aged 15 to 29, 981 (49.4%) aged 30 to 64, and 498 (25.1%) aged 65 or older.

People could identify as more than one ethnicity. The results were 93.4% European (Pākehā); 6.5% Māori; 1.4% Pasifika; 3.9% Asian; 1.4% Middle Eastern, Latin American and African New Zealanders (MELAA); and 2.7% other, which includes people giving their ethnicity as "New Zealander". English was spoken by 98.6%, Māori by 1.8%, Samoan by 0.5%, and other languages by 15.1%. No language could be spoken by 0.8% (e.g. too young to talk). New Zealand Sign Language was known by 0.5%. The percentage of people born overseas was 28.2, compared with 28.8% nationally.

Religious affiliations were 28.1% Christian, 0.6% Hindu, 0.2% Islam, 0.3% Māori religious beliefs, 0.6% Buddhist, 0.3% New Age, 0.2% Jewish, and 1.1% other religions. People who answered that they had no religion were 62.7%, and 6.6% of people did not answer the census question.

Of those at least 15 years old, 927 (54.1%) people had a bachelor's or higher degree, 636 (37.1%) had a post-high school certificate or diploma, and 156 (9.1%) people exclusively held high school qualifications. The median income was $61,800, compared with $41,500 nationally. 540 people (31.5%) earned over $100,000 compared to 12.1% nationally. The employment status of those at least 15 was 870 (50.8%) full-time, 282 (16.5%) part-time, and 27 (1.6%) unemployed.

== Education ==
Wellesley College is a private boys' primary school for Year 1 to 8 students, with a roll of 232 as of July 2026. It opened in 1914.

== People ==
=== James Herbert Williams ===
James Herbert Williams (c.1858–1915) for many years connected with his father's shipping business subsequently created the local tug and ferry service which he conducted for a number of years and eventually formed into the Wellington Steam Ferry Company Limited. He, and later through that company, developed Day's Bay Estate into a popular resort. He died at his residence, 22 Hobson Street, Thorndon, 19 January 1915 aged 57 leaving a son and three daughters.

J H Williams held the piloting and tugboat contract at Wellington 1894–99, his tugs were Duco and Mana In 1900 he sold his business, including the resort of Days Bay, into his Wellington Steam Ferry Company. In 1914, less than twelve months before he died, his mother gave a large sum of money to help Wellington City Council purchase from a subsequent owner the Day's Bay resort for the benefit of the public. In view of her considerable generosity the Wellington City Council named the resort Williams Park. The ferries and the hotel were bought by other interests.

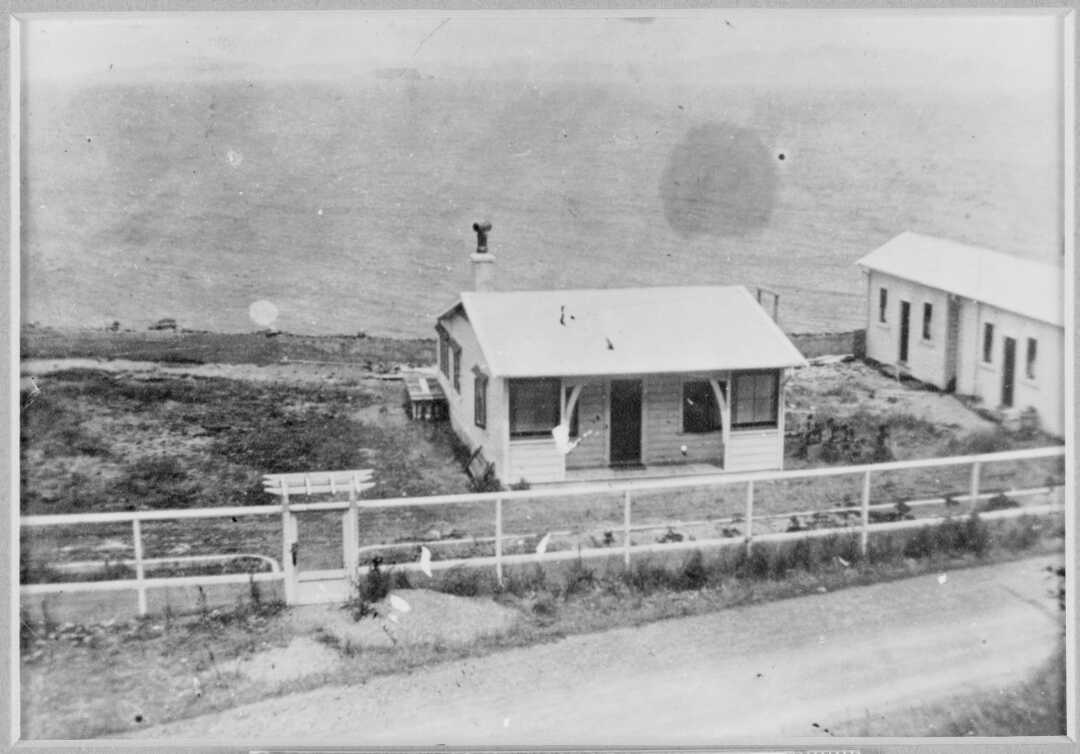
The Beauchamp family cottage in Day's Bay

=== Katherine Mansfield At the Bay ===
The area has particular associations with the young Katherine Mansfield. The story "At the Bay" was based on her holiday experiences as a child when Day's Bay encompassed Rona Bay and Muritai and they took a house on the rise above St Alban's church. After she came back from school in England her father had a tiny family holiday cottage on Day's Bay's rocky beachfront by the point where what is now Marine Parade turns towards Sunshine Bay.

=== Wellington Steam Ferry Company Limited ===
Wellington Steam Ferry Company Limited incorporated 1900 (J H Williams, manager E G F Zohrab) Williams sold his interest in 1905 to William Watson's syndicate and the company became a subsidiary of Watson's newly formed Wellington Harbour Ferries Limited.

Miramar Ferry Company Limited

incorporated 1901, plant sold to Wellington Harbour Ferries Limited in 1906.

Wellington Harbour Ferries Limited

incorporated 1906 (Wm Watson (1846–1938), president of the Bank of New Zealand, and other Seatoun residents, manager E G F Zohrab) to own a controlling share of Wellington Steam Ferry Company Limited and the plant from Miramar Ferry. In 1913 the ferries were sold to the Eastbourne Borough Council and Day's Bay House to Miss Sommerville for Croydon School. The remaining Day's Bay land was bought by Wellington City Council and the companies were eventually wound up.

== Notes ==
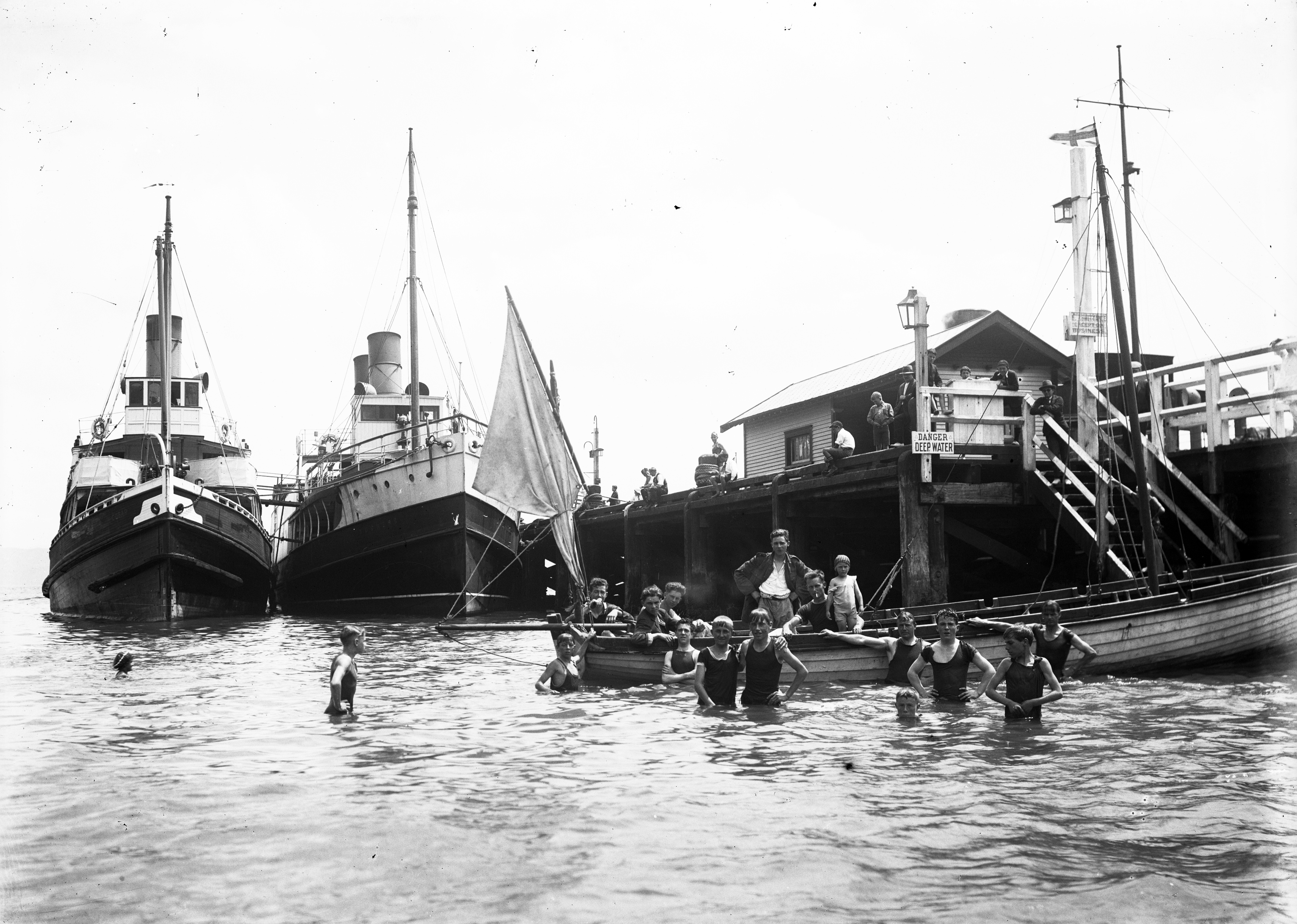
Wharf 1920s

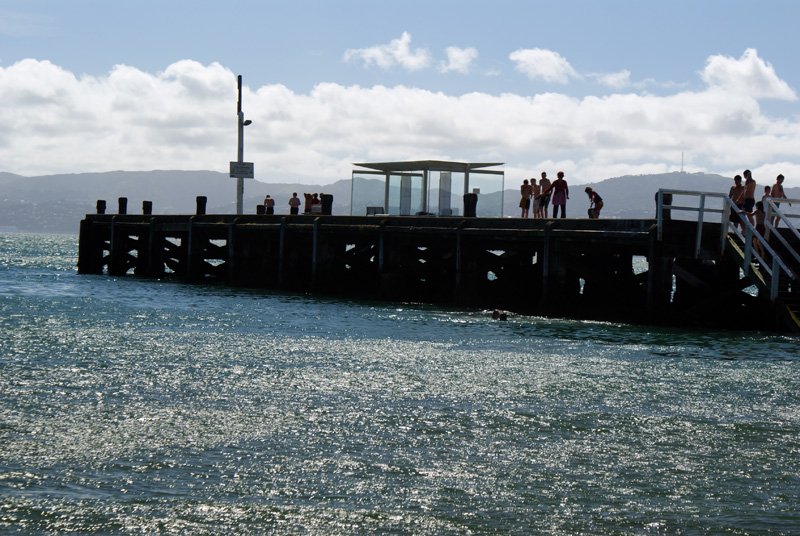
Wharf 2009
