= Bob Vance (cricketer) =

New Zealand cricketer

Bob Vance CBE
- Vance in 1962

Personal information
- Full name: Robert Alan Vance
- Born: 29 December 1924; Wellington, New Zealand
- Died: 7 November 1994 (aged 69); Wellington, New Zealand
- Batting: Right-handed
- Relatives: Bert Vance (son)

Domestic team information
- Years: Team
- 1947/48–1961/62: Wellington

Career statistics
Competition	First-class
Matches	41
Runs scored	1,510
Batting average	21.57
100s/50s	1/7
Top score	109
Balls bowled	36
Wickets	3
Bowling average	3.00
5 wickets in innings	0
10 wickets in match	0
Best bowling	2/8
Catches/stumpings	34/–
- Source: Cricinfo, 21 September 2015

Robert Alan Vance CBE (29 December 1924 – 7 November 1994) was a New Zealand cricketer who played first-class cricket for Wellington from 1948 to 1962. He was chairman of the New Zealand Cricket Council from 1978 to 1987.

== Playing career ==
Vance was a member of the Wellington Colts XI that was undefeated in the 1946–47 season. He made his first-class debut for Wellington in 1947–48, and established his position as an opening batsman in 1950–51, when he scored 75 and 29 in a victory over Auckland. He remained in the team, sometimes as an opener, sometimes batting at number three or four. He made his only century, 109 against Central Districts, on Christmas Day 1956.

He captained Wellington in 1953–54 and 1961–62 when John Reid, Wellington's captain from 1951–52 to 1964–65, was touring South Africa with the Test team. Under Vance's captaincy in 1961–62 Wellington won their first four matches inside two days and went on to win the Plunket Shield. After the season Vance retired from first-class cricket.

== Administrative career ==
Vance was chairman of the New Zealand Cricket Council from 1978 to 1987, and managed the New Zealand cricket team in England in 1986. The R. A. Vance Stand at Basin Reserve in Wellington, built in 1979–80, is named in his honour.

In the 1983 New Year Honours, Vance was appointed a Commander of the Order of the British Empire, for services to cricket and the community.

His son Bert played Test cricket for New Zealand in the 1980s.
