= Robert Vance (cricketer) =

New Zealand cricketer

Bert Vance
Personal information
- Full name: Robert Howard Vance
- Born: 31 March 1955 (age 71); Wellington, New Zealand
- Batting: Right-handed
- Bowling: Right arm off break
- Role: Wicket-keeper
- Relatives: Bob Vance (father)

International information
- National side: New Zealand (1988–1989)
- Test debut (cap 166): 30 March 1988 v England
- Last Test: 24 November 1989 v Australia
- ODI debut (cap 63): 16 March 1988 v England
- Last ODI: 8 March 1989 v Pakistan

Career statistics
Competition	Test	ODI	FC	LA
Matches	4	8	135	78
Runs scored	207	248	6,955	1,607
Batting average	29.57	31.00	32.80	22.31
100s/50s	0/1	0/1	12/36	1/11
Top score	68	96	254*	106
Balls bowled	–	–	266	–
Wickets	–	–	4	–
Bowling average	–	–	58.00	–
5 wickets in innings	–	–	0	–
10 wickets in match	–	–	0	–
Best bowling	–	–	2/18	–
Catches/stumpings	0/–	4/–	150/4	33/1
- Source: Cricinfo, 4 May 2017

Robert Howard "Bert" Vance (born 31 March 1955) is a former New Zealand cricketer. He played in four Test matches and eight One Day Internationals for New Zealand.

Vance was born into a cricketing family; his father, Bob Vance, was for many years a part of the Wellington team and a long-term chairman of NZ Cricket.

== Domestic career ==
Vance first played for Wellington in the 1976–77 season and for four of the next five seasons was the Wellington wicket-keeper before beginning to concentrate on his batting. After establishing himself as a specialist batsman he became one of the most prolific batsmen in New Zealand domestic cricket through the 1980s

Vance was in his twelfth season of first-class cricket and thirty-two years old when finally called up to the New Zealand Test team in the New Zealand summer of 1987–88. That season he scored 638 runs for Wellington at an average of 79.75 and including three centuries. This was followed up the next season with 888 runs at an average of 80.72 including four centuries – a performance which saw him again included in the Test team.

Statistically, Vance's main claim to fame is deliberately conceding, on the instructions of his captain, a record 77 runs in a single over in 1990.
