= Wharves in Wellington Harbour =

Coordinates: 41.284°S 174.781°E

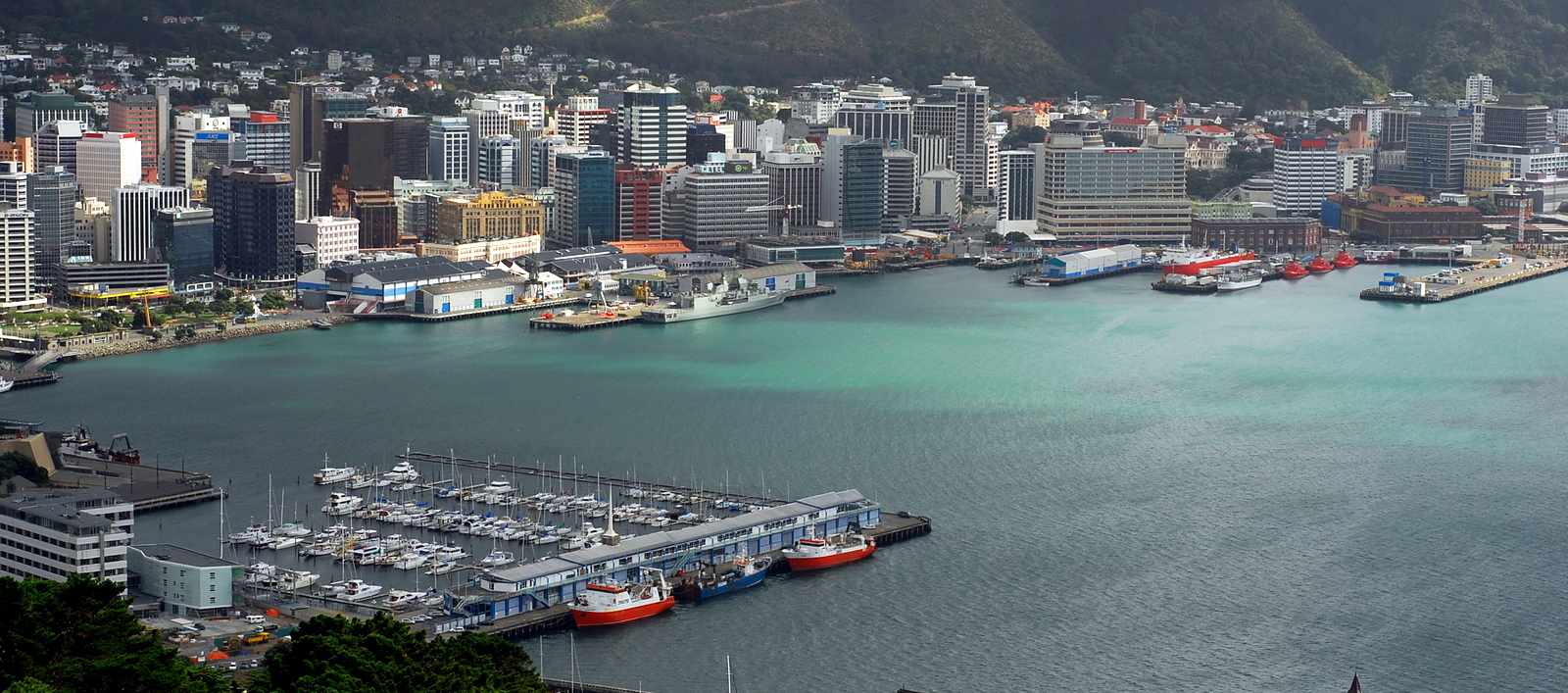
View of Wellington Harbour from Mt Victoria, showing inner harbour wharves. Anticlockwise from top right: Glasgow Wharf, Railway Wharf, Waterloo Quay Wharf, Ferry Wharf (with Eastbourne Ferry Terminal building), Tug Wharf, Queens Wharf. The end of Taranaki Street Wharf can be seen at centre-left, and Clyde Quay Wharf is in the foreground.

Wharves in Wellington Harbour have been essential to the operation of the Port of Wellington and to the development of the city and the lower half of the North Island of New Zealand.

There are 20 wharves situated around Wellington Harbour. These include large wharves in the inner harbour and port area, smaller wharves in seaside suburbs and fuel wharves at Point Howard and Evans Bay. The first wharves were built from 1840 by newly arrived European settlers, to enable them to move goods from ship to shore. The first publicly owned wharf built in Wellington Harbour was Queens Wharf, completed in 1862. Wharves were built for various purposes – moving fuel, primary products such as timber, wool and meat coming from the hinterland, and other goods and passengers. Wharves for passenger vessels included berths for ferries transporting commuters and day trippers to and from the city and suburbs, and larger inter-island ferries going to Picton and Lyttelton. The wharves also serviced passenger liners from overseas and TEAL flying boats.

Wellington Harbour Board was created in 1880 and took control of most wharves in the harbour until its disestablishment in 1989. At that time a commercial company, Port of Wellington (now called CentrePort Wellington), took over management of most industrial wharves, while Wellington City Council and Hutt City Council gained control of most suburban wharves.

Over time Wellington's wharves have been altered, upgraded, extended, truncated or buried in reclamation along the shoreline of Wellington Harbour. Many wharves have been repurposed in response to changing domestic and international conditions and requirements for maritime transport of passengers and cargo.

== Inner harbour ==
=== Early private wharves ===
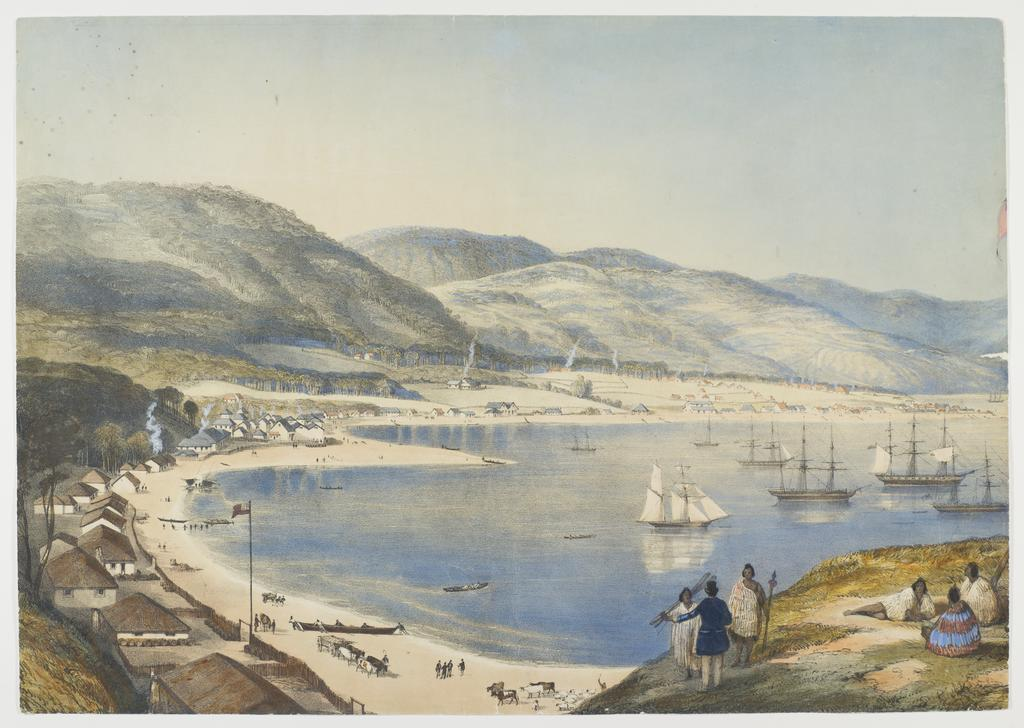
Lambton Harbour, by Charles Heaphy. Drawn in 1841

Wellington Harbour's first wharves were privately owned, built by businessmen to facilitate movement of goods from ships to warehouses and shops. Goods were transhipped from deep-sea vessels to lighters and then to the shore. The names of these early private wharves changed as their ownership changed: for example, Hickson's wharf was also known as Ridgway's Wharf, Wills' Wharf and Houghton's Wharf.

The first wharf built may have been one constructed by J. H. Wallace, opposite Bowen Street. A newspaper article in 1930 described the wharf: "its construction was of the simplest. An empty dry-goods hogshead was carried out as far below low-water mark as it could be placed. When it was filled with stones it constituted the outer pier. Rough wooden trestles were placed at intervals in the intervening space, on which were laid some long straight logs, bound together by wooden ties, and squared on top by the nimble use of an adze".

Other early wharves include Tod's Wharf, in operation by September 1840; Taine's Wharf, built by James John Taine who arrived in Wellington in 1840 and soon built a wharf opposite his premises in Lambton Quay; and Rhodes' Wharf, constructed in 1841 by William Barnard Rhodes. He built a wharf near what is now the Michael Fowler Centre carpark at lower Cuba Street to provide access to his goods store and iron store. Baron Charles Ernest von Alzdorf, land agent and hotelier, built a wharf opposite his hotel. Alzdorf's Wharf was said to have been left high and dry fifty feet from the water after the 1855 earthquake raised the seabed.

By the early 1860s many of these small private wharves were needing repairs and were no longer suitable for serving the larger ships that had begun visiting Wellington.

=== Queens Wharf (1862) ===
From 1856, Wellington Chamber of Commerce began calling on the provincial government to fund construction of a large publicly owned wharf that could serve steamers on the Panama route. Queens Wharf, possibly named by local man Thomas McKenzie in honour of Queen Victoria, opened in 1862 as Wellington's first public wharf and is Wellington's oldest extant wharf. The original wharf was constructed from timber, with totara piles. It was 170 m (550 ft) long with two cross tees extending 23 m (75 ft) on each side. The wharf was extended several times as harbour reclamation occurred and larger ships arrived, beginning in 1865–67 with a 61 m (200 ft) extension seawards, followed by a new cross section 91 m (300 ft) long, extensions to the original cross sections, and the addition of a steam crane and goods sheds.

Queens Wharf was managed by the Provincial Council and then Wellington City Council until Wellington Harbour Board was created in 1880. Queens Wharf became the Harbour Board's operational base and was the port’s main wharf until the advent of container shipping in the 1970s. Two historical buildings on Jervois Quay at the entrance to Queens Wharf date from the Harbour Board era: the Wellington Harbour Board Head Office and Bond Store (1892) and the Wellington Harbour Board Wharf Office Building (1896). Art Nouveau gates made of iron were installed in 1899 between these buildings at the wharf entrance.

During the 1913 Great Strike, supporters broke through gates and barricades at Queens Wharf and Kings Wharf and boarded ships in an attempt to stop strike-breakers from working. They also stopped goods vehicles and racehorses heading for Christchurch from entering Queens Wharf.

In 1989 the Harbour Board was disestablished and a new company (Port of Wellington, now CentrePort Wellington) took over management of port operations. The seafront from Shed 21 near the railway station to Clyde Quay, which includes Queens Wharf, was handed to Wellington City Council. In the 1990s Lambton Harbour Management, a company controlled by Wellington City Council, was involved in developing Queens Wharf as an entertainment area. Two large buildings, Queens Wharf Retail Centre and Queens Wharf Events Centre, opened in 1995. They were designed by the architect to look like wharf sheds. The retail centre was an immediate failure, and the building was sold in 1998 to be converted into office space. The events centre, now known as TSB Arena, still operates and hosts music concerts, sports and other events. Two old goods sheds on the wharf, Shed 3 and Shed 5, were turned into restaurants.

In 2001, Waterfront Investments proposed to build a Hilton Hotel on the outer tee of Queens Wharf. Greater Wellington Regional Council supported the proposed hotel, but a public survey showed that 86% of those surveyed did not want a hotel at this location. In 2009 the Environment Court turned down the proposal, stating that "building a five-star hotel on a public wharf was inconsistent with the sustainable use of natural and physical resources".

Three cranes are displayed on the wharf. One of them, a level luffing crane built in 1951 by Stothert & Pitt, is thought to be the only one of its type in New Zealand. There is a Stothert & Pitt tripod gantry crane, one of ten bought in 1966 that operated on Glasgow Wharf until containerisation arrived, and the third crane is a Series 520 Straddle Carrier used in the early days of container shipping.

There is a memorial to Paddy the Wanderer at the entrance to Queens Wharf, outside the Wharf Office Building. Paddy was a dog which used to roam the waterfront during the 1930s, befriending sailors and wharf workers. The memorial includes a bronze likeness of Paddy, a drinking fountain and drinking bowls below for dogs. Erected in 1945, it was paid for by people who knew Paddy and includes stones from London's Waterloo Bridge, bombed during World War II.

Views of Queens Wharf

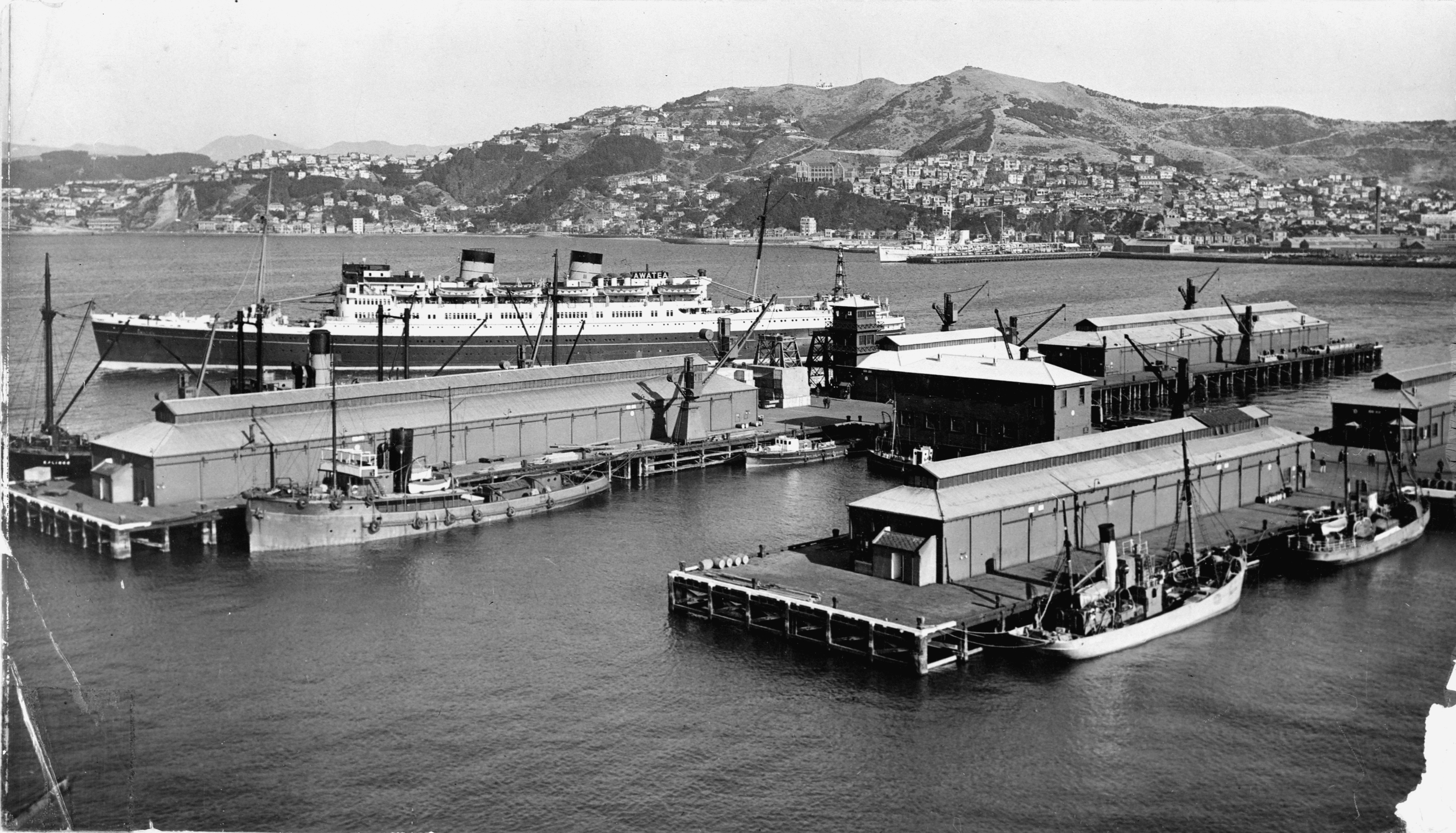
Outer tee c. 1936-1942. Shed 3 in centre, Shed 5 in foreground.

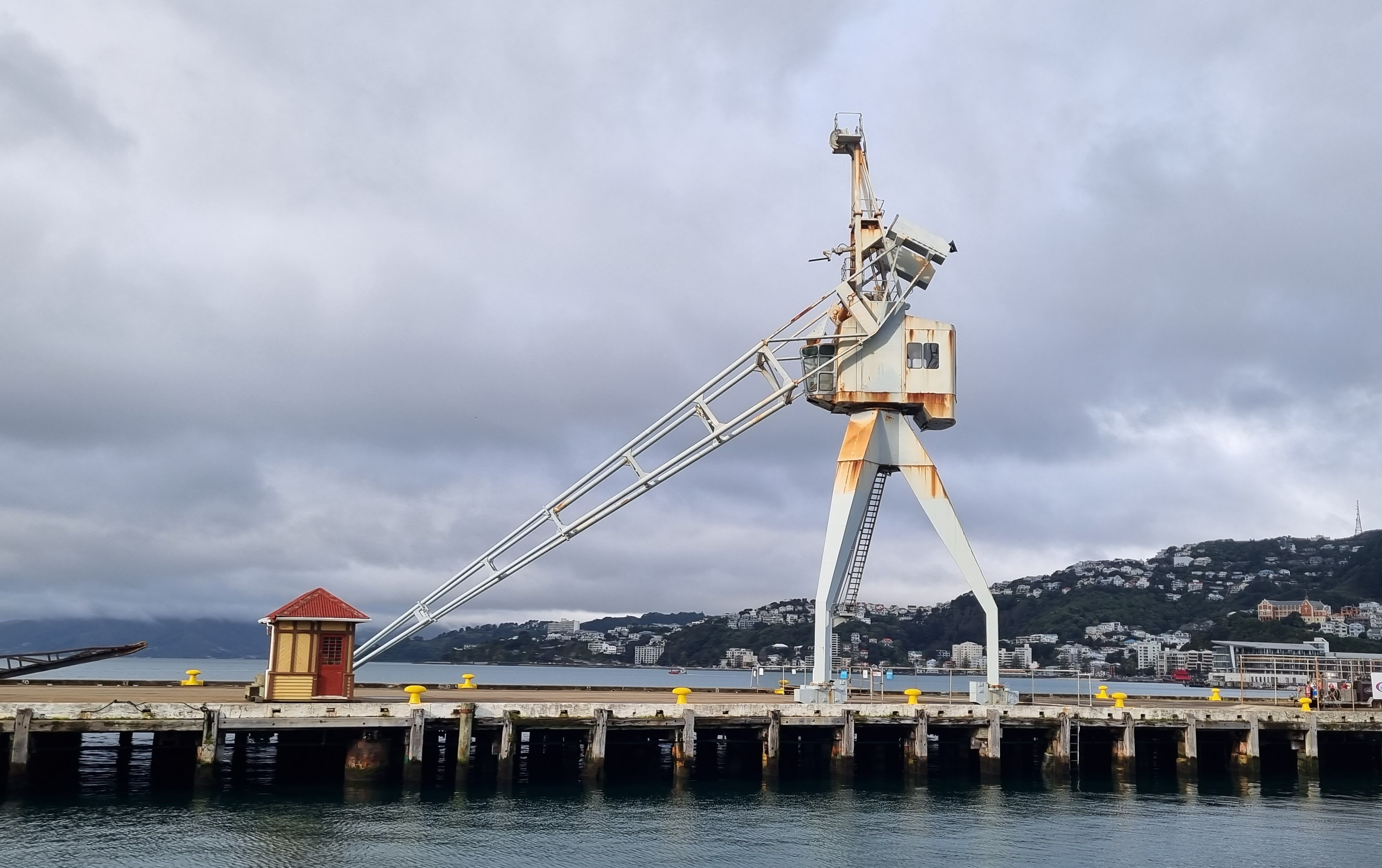
Tripod gantry crane on outer tee

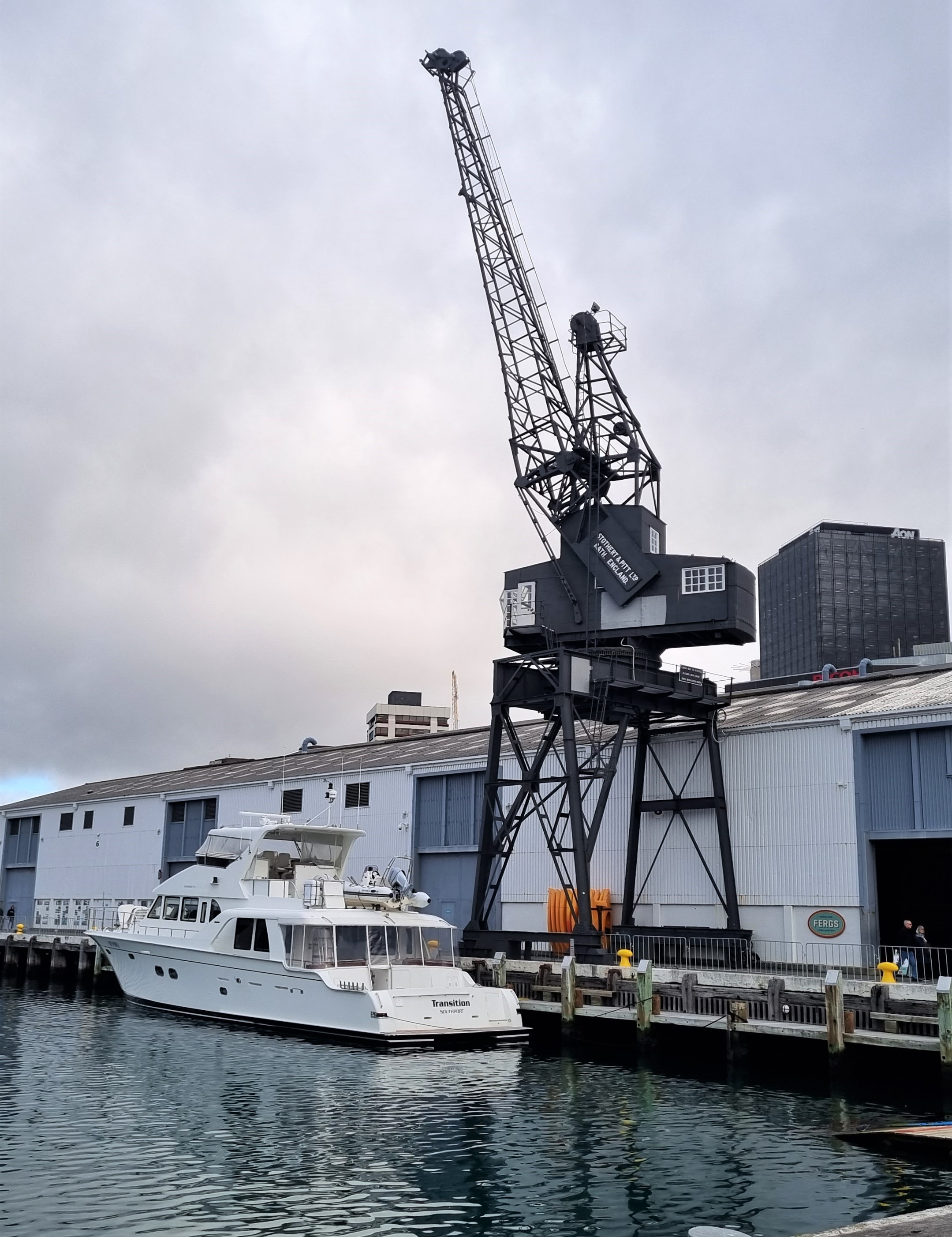
Level luffing crane

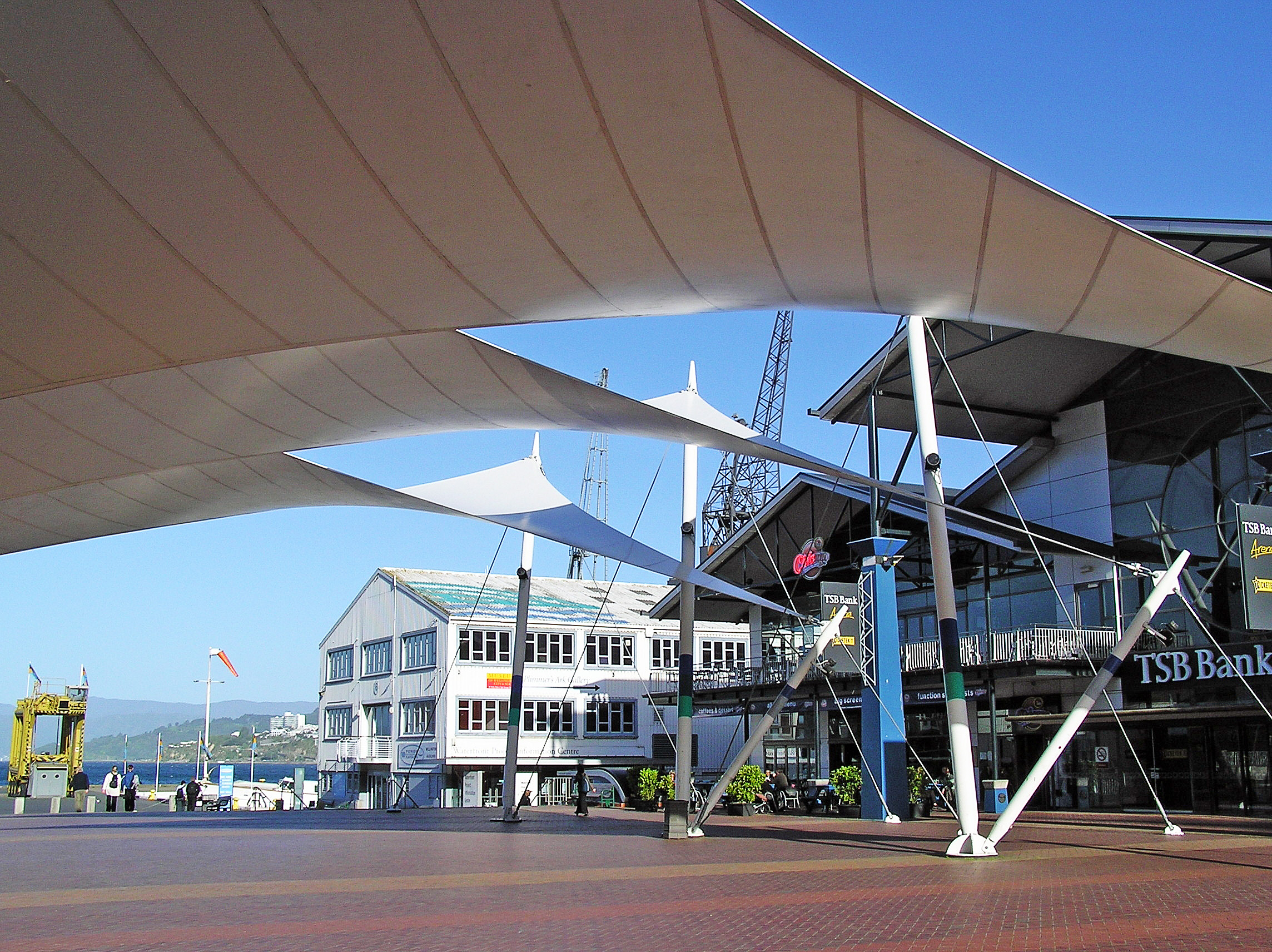
Shed 6 and TSB Arena

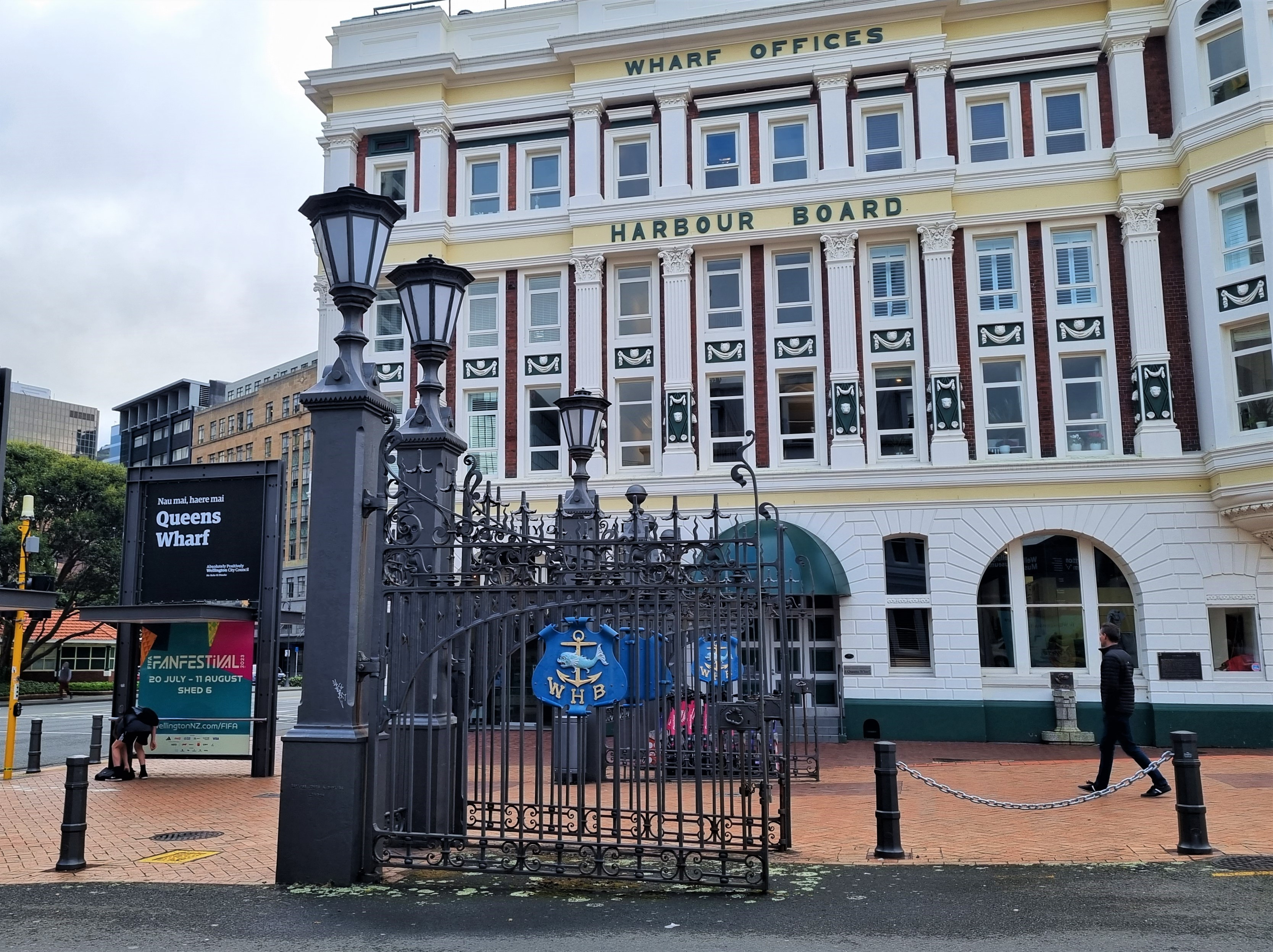
Gates and Harbour Board Wharf Offices building

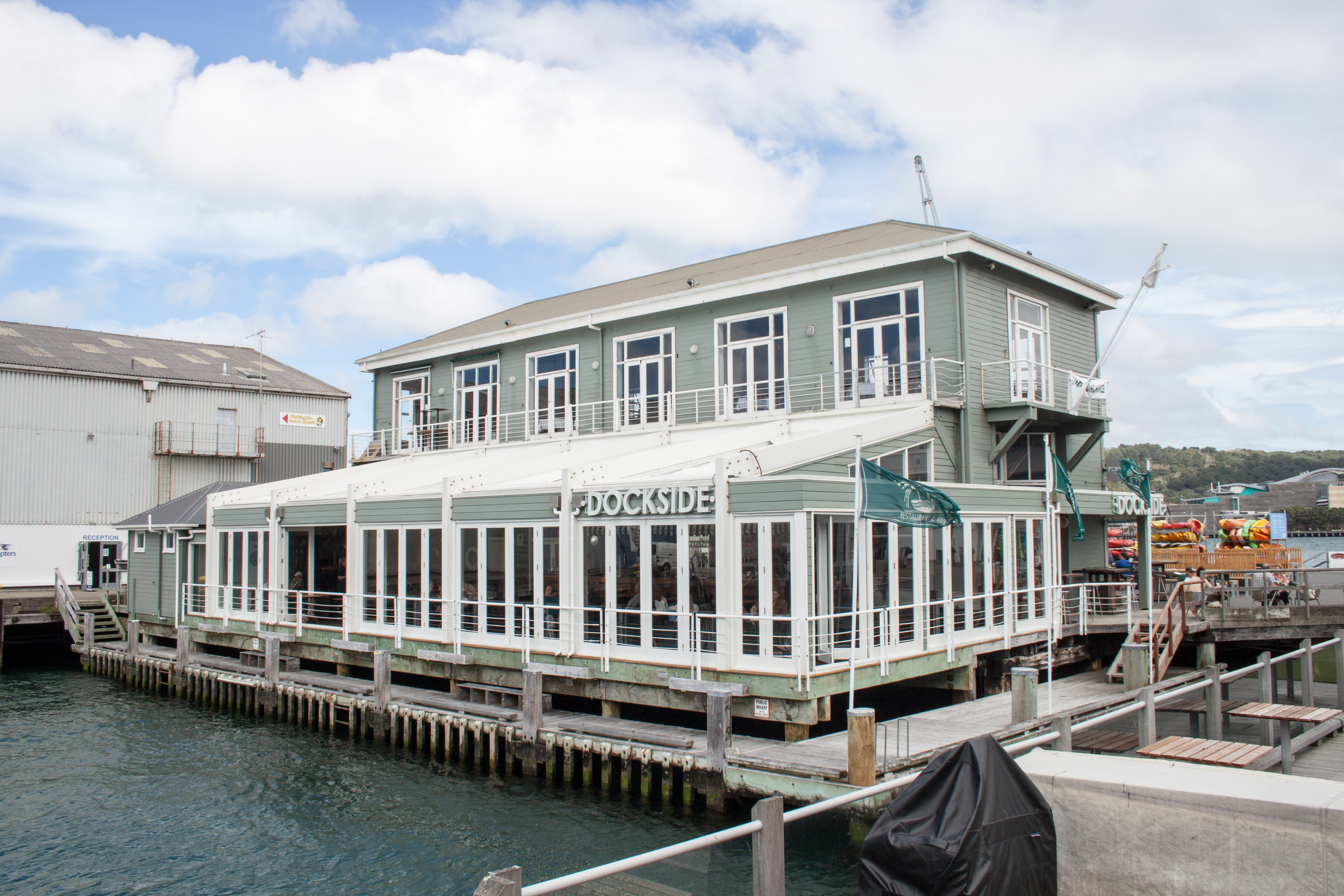
Dockside restaurant (formerly Shed 3)

=== Railway Wharf (1880) ===
Railway Wharf was Wellington's second deep-water wharf after Queens Wharf. It was built by the government and completed in April 1880 on newly reclaimed land near the Railway Station. Control of the wharf passed to Wellington Harbour Board after the Wellington Harbour Board and Corporation Land Act came into effect on 1 September 1880. From the start the wharf was designed to have rail access to facilitate handling of goods, and three separate lines were laid down. The wharf was angled on a north-north-west /south-south-east axis, the same as Queens Wharf, because at the time it was important to moor vessels "fore-and-aft" to align with Wellington's prevailing winds. From 1906 to 1951, Railway Wharf was Wellington's main wharf for unloading coal. In 1951 the railway lines were removed, and the wharf was extended and converted to become the base for the inter-island ferry to Lyttelton which had previously been at Waterloo Quay Wharf. Ferries to Picton also operated from this wharf. The wharf was renamed the Inter-Island Wharf, with the first ferries berthing in 1954. The wharf was altered again when roll-on/roll-off ferries were introduced, but after 1975 the wharf was no longer used by ferries. Railway Wharf is managed by CentrePort.

=== Waterloo Quay Wharf (1883) ===
The wharf now known as Waterloo Quay Wharf was completed in 1883, the first wharf built after Wellington Harbour Board was established in 1880. The wharf was built to serve the wool trade and was known as Wool Wharf or Wool Jetty. A shed that could hold 6000 bales of wool was built at the city end of the wharf. Originally the wharf was connected to land by a bridge, until the space between was reclaimed by 1906. Over the years the wharf has been altered and extended. In 1916 it was converted to serve the inter-island ferry to Lyttelton and until 1953 was known at first as the Wellington-Lyttelton Ferry Wharf, and later Lyttelton Wharf. The ferry terminal was then moved to Railway Wharf, and from about that time Lyttelton Wharf became Waterloo Quay Wharf, used by coastal trading ships. For many years until 2009 the Police Maritime Unit operated from Shed 19 on the wharf. The wharf was also used as a base for the Lynx and other fast ferries. Waterloo Quay Wharf is controlled by CentrePort.

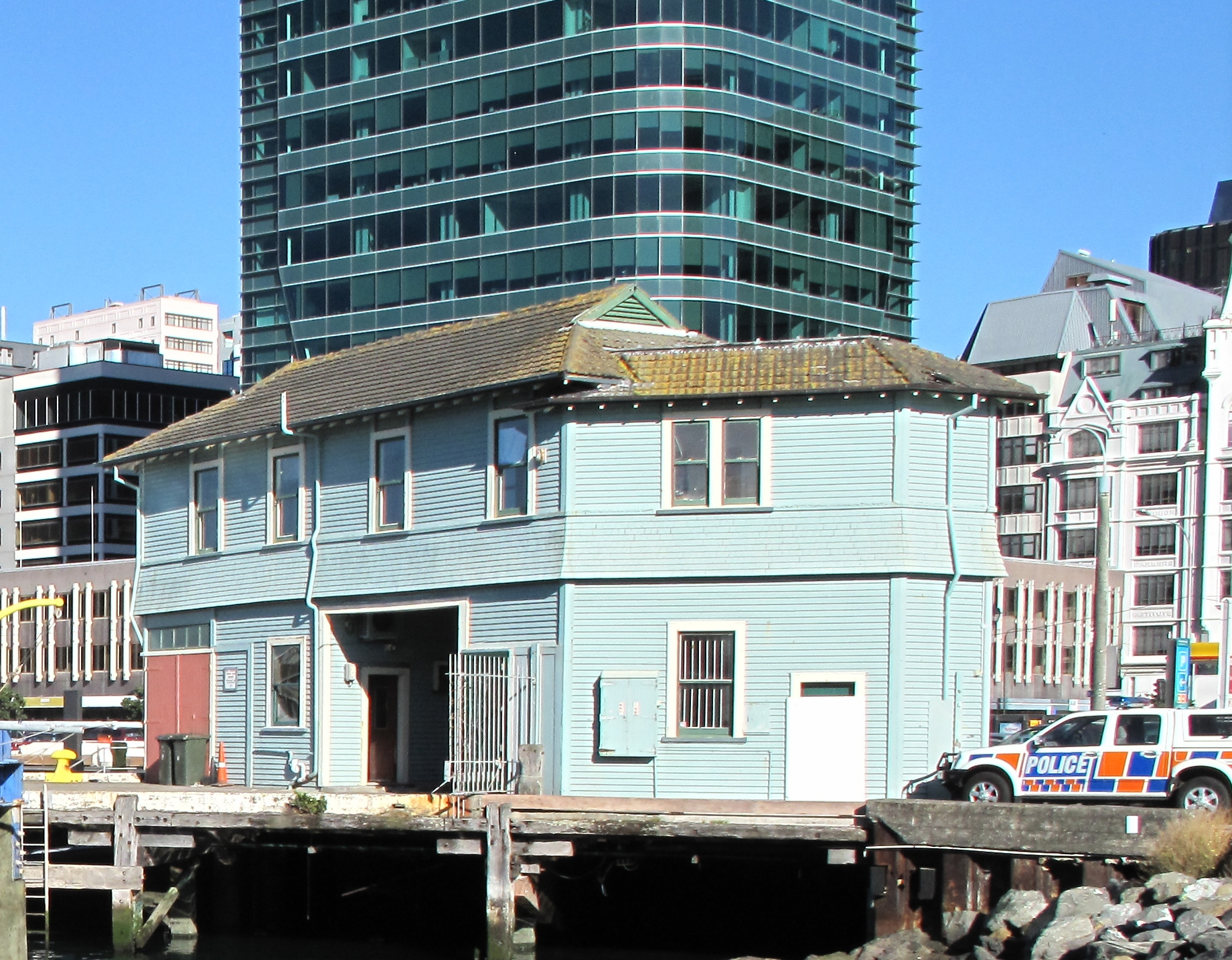
Former Eastbourne Ferry Building at Ferry Wharf

=== Ferry Wharf (1897) ===
Ferry Wharf, also known as Ferry Wharf no. 1 to distinguish it from Tug Wharf (or Ferry Wharf no. 2) built beside it some years later, is located immediately west of Waterloo Quay Wharf. J H Williams had begun a ferry service to Days Bay in 1895, and Wellington Harbour Board wanted to take pressure off busy Queens Wharf. Ferry Wharf came into use in 1897, with additions in 1906 and 1912–1914. The wharf was connected to land by a bridge until reclamation was carried out. In 1912, Wellington Harbour Board built a ferry terminal building at the head of the wharf for the Wellington Ferry Company. Eastbourne Borough Council leased the building from the Harbour Board and operated a ferry service to Eastbourne until 1948. The building then had various occupiers until 2009, when it became the base for the Police Maritime Unit and national dive squad. The Eastbourne Ferry Building is listed as a Historic Place Category 2 by Heritage New Zealand.

=== Glasgow Wharf (1901) ===
The Harbour Board approved plans and funding for a new road and railway wharf in 1898–1899, as part of a larger scheme of harbour reclamation and development. The wharf was named Glasgow Wharf after the late governor, the Earl of Glasgow. It was about 180 m (580 ft) long and 43 m (140 ft) wide and constructed of imported ironbark timber. The wharf was completed in November 1901 at a cost of about £60,000 including sheds and cranes. The Evening Post reported that "the wharf is in all respects the finest structure of the kind in the southern hemisphere". An innovative feature at the time was the installation of ten gantry cranes, built by the Hydraulic Engineering Company of Chester, which were said to be better for working on big ships than the cranes then in use at Queens Wharf. The wharf handled frozen meat and produce needing cold storage.

The wharf has been upgraded several times. In 1966 the Harbour Board installed 10 new electric tripod gantry cranes. These were then made obsolete by the introduction of containerisation. One crane was restored and is now on display at Queens Wharf.

From 1992 until 2004, Glasgow Wharf was the base for the Straitsman ferry, and since 2003 Bluebridge ferries have operated from the wharf. The wharf is managed by CentrePort and is not open to the public.

=== Taranaki Street Wharf (1906) ===
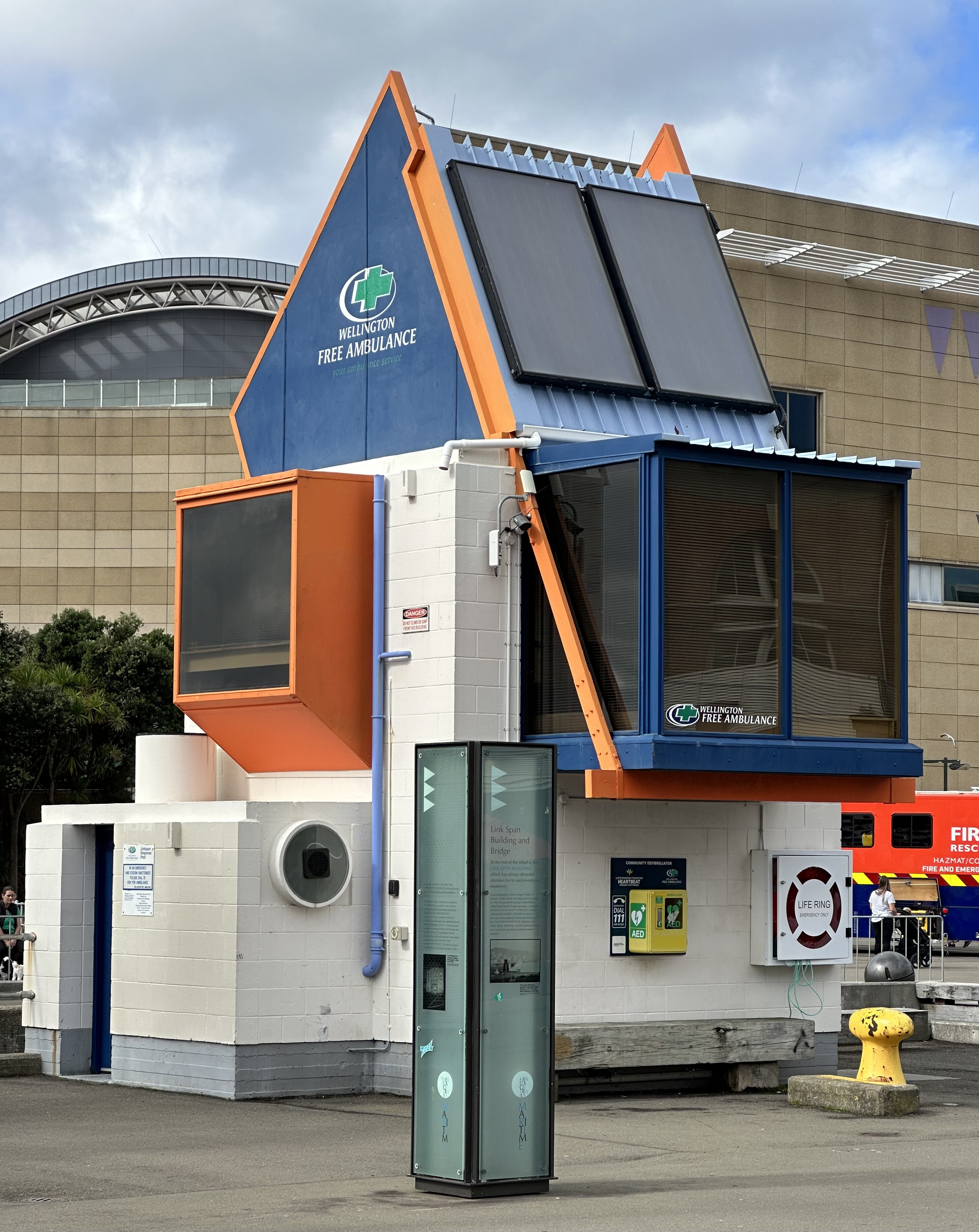
Link span building by Roger Walker at Taranaki Street Wharf

In 1898, the chief engineer of Wellington Harbour Board suggested construction of a wharf opposite Taranaki Street, to be used mainly for moving coal but also for timber and produce. After preparatory reclamation and dredging, the wharf was built in 1906. The wharf was 152 m (499 ft) long by 33 m (108 ft) wide and constructed from Australian hardwood. It had one fixed 20-ton hydraulic crane and 10 moveable 2-ton hydraulic cranes for shifting coal. Ornamental gates at the entrance to the wharf are similar to those at Queens Wharf. They were installed in the 1930s, replacing earlier gates.

A major change to the wharf came in the late 1960s, when the wharf was converted for use by roll-on/roll-off ferries. A linkspan bridge with a control building designed by Roger Walker was completed in 1969. The Union Steamship Company planned to operate a fortnightly freight service to Australia, but the freight service was soon overtaken by the introduction of containerisation based at Thorndon. The original bridge has since been replaced by a stylised version, and the building which housed machinery for operating the bridge is now used as a base by Wellington Free Ambulance.

Land between Queens Wharf and Taranaki Street Wharf was reclaimed from 1969, allowing creation of Frank Kitts Park and Whairepo Lagoon and closing in the landward side of Taranaki Street Wharf. In 1989 two historic rowing club buildings were moved to the reclaimed area.

In 2002, Wellington Waterfront Limited began transforming the Taranaki Street Wharf area to a public space. In 2011, Te Wharewaka o Pōneke opened on reclaimed land between the wharf and the lagoon. This building is an enterprise by Taranaki iwi and Wellington Waterfront Limited. It houses several waka, as well as a café and function rooms. Taranaki Street Wharf is now part of a waterfront public area and promenade stretching from Clyde Quay to Waterloo Quay and is managed by Wellington City Council.

The floating crane Hikitia is berthed at Taranaki Street Wharf.

=== Kings Wharf (1909) ===
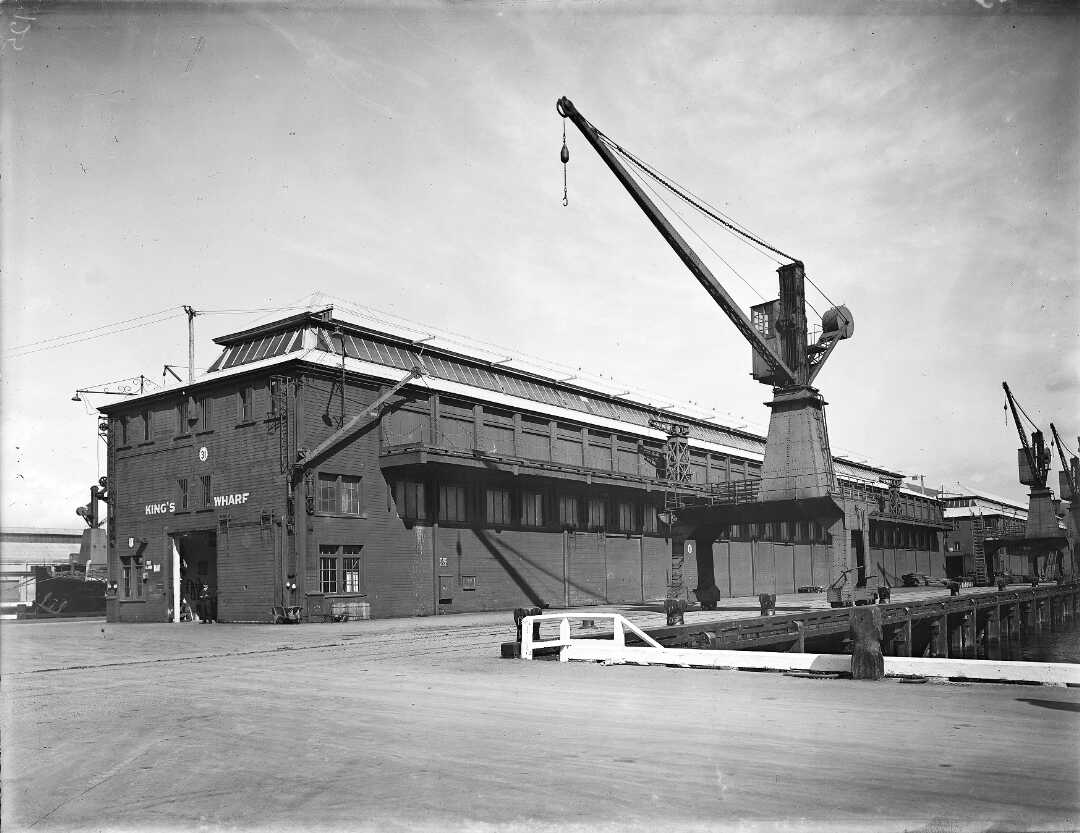
Kings Wharf sheds and cranes, c. 1930s

Kings Wharf is a timber wharf constructed between 1906 and 1909, parallel with and to the east of Glasgow Wharf. Tenders for construction of the wharf and two double-storeyed sheds were accepted in September 1906, with Charles F Pulley as the builder. The wharf was 262 m (861 ft) long and 49 m (160 ft) wide. It was built on 903 ironbark timber piles, arranged in 42 bays each of 6.1 m (20 ft). The construction included two double-storeyed sheds (numbered 31 and 33) of timber construction. Railway tracks were provided on each side of the wharf, and large mobile cranes on special tracks were used for handling cargo between railway wagons and the holds of ships at the wharf. The wharf was completed in 1909, with a ceremony for the laying of the last block held on 26 March 1909. It was the last major wharf to be built in timber, as concrete was used for all other wharf construction after 1909.

One of the notable vessels to berth at the wharf in the years immediately following its construction was HMS New Zealand, the Royal Navy battlecruiser of the dreadnought era. The vessel had been funded for the Royal Navy by New Zealand as a gift. It berthed at Kings Wharf in June 1913, during HMS New Zealand's 1913 circumnavigation. Later in 1913, the wharf was the location of a strike by waterside workers that was an early stage of the 1913 Great Strike. During the Second World War, another notable event at Kings Wharf was the arrival of USS Wakefieldon 14 June 1942, carrying around 6,000 US marines from the 1st Marine Division.

In the 1960s, the Thorndon Container Terminal was built with reclamation of land up to and including the east side of Kings Wharf. However, berth 1 on the western side of Kings Wharf remains operational. Kings Wharf was pushed sideways by the 2016 Kaikōura earthquake, but has been repaired.

=== Clyde Quay Wharf (1910) and Overseas Passenger Terminal (1964) ===
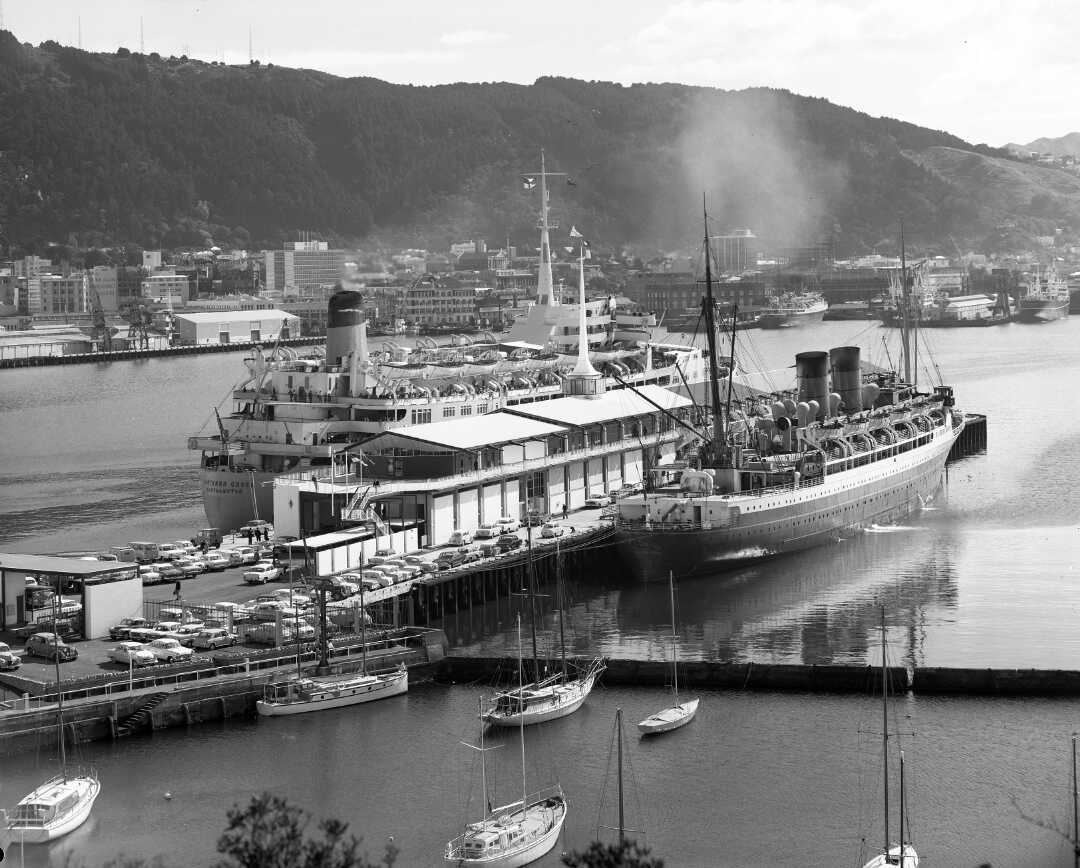
Overseas Passenger Terminal c. 14 April 1965, with vessels Southern Cross and Rangatira

Clyde Quay Wharf was completed in 1910 by Wellington Harbour Board. Its location and purpose were controversial at the time. Trade in imported goods was decreasing by the time the wharf was completed, and the wharf was distant from the rest of the port, so it was never used as much as other wharves in the harbour. The wharf was 170 m (560 ft) long and was the first wharf in Wellington built of reinforced concrete rather than timber. It was also notable for a line of concrete arches 6.1 m (20 ft) high running the length of the wharf. This was a crane track for electric cranes to run along, but initially the Harbour Board chose not to install a crane until it was proven necessary. In 1961 the wharf was closed.

The wharf was then extended, and the Overseas Passenger Terminal was built on the wharf by the Wellington Harbour Board. The building was constructed to replace inadequate passenger facilities at the wharves on the other side of the inner harbour. It was designed by an architectural practice owned by former Wellington Mayor Michael Fowler. The design was intended to give the appearance of an ocean liner and included customs and immigration facilities, a restaurant, café and waiting lounges. It was opened on 7 December 1964. However, it was effectively obsolete at the time of opening because of a rapid decline in international passenger shipping resulting from increasing international air travel. The building was subsequently used as an exhibition and events centre and housed various businesses and restaurants. The Overseas Passenger Terminal was demolished in 2012 to make way for a new apartment complex called Clyde Quay Wharf, which opened in 2014. The Clyde Quay Wharf apartments were designed by Athfield Architects and won several awards. There are 75 apartments in the building, but the area at ground level around the wharf has been left accessible to the public. The spire and four wall mosaics from the old building were used in the new one.

=== Tug Wharf (1914) ===
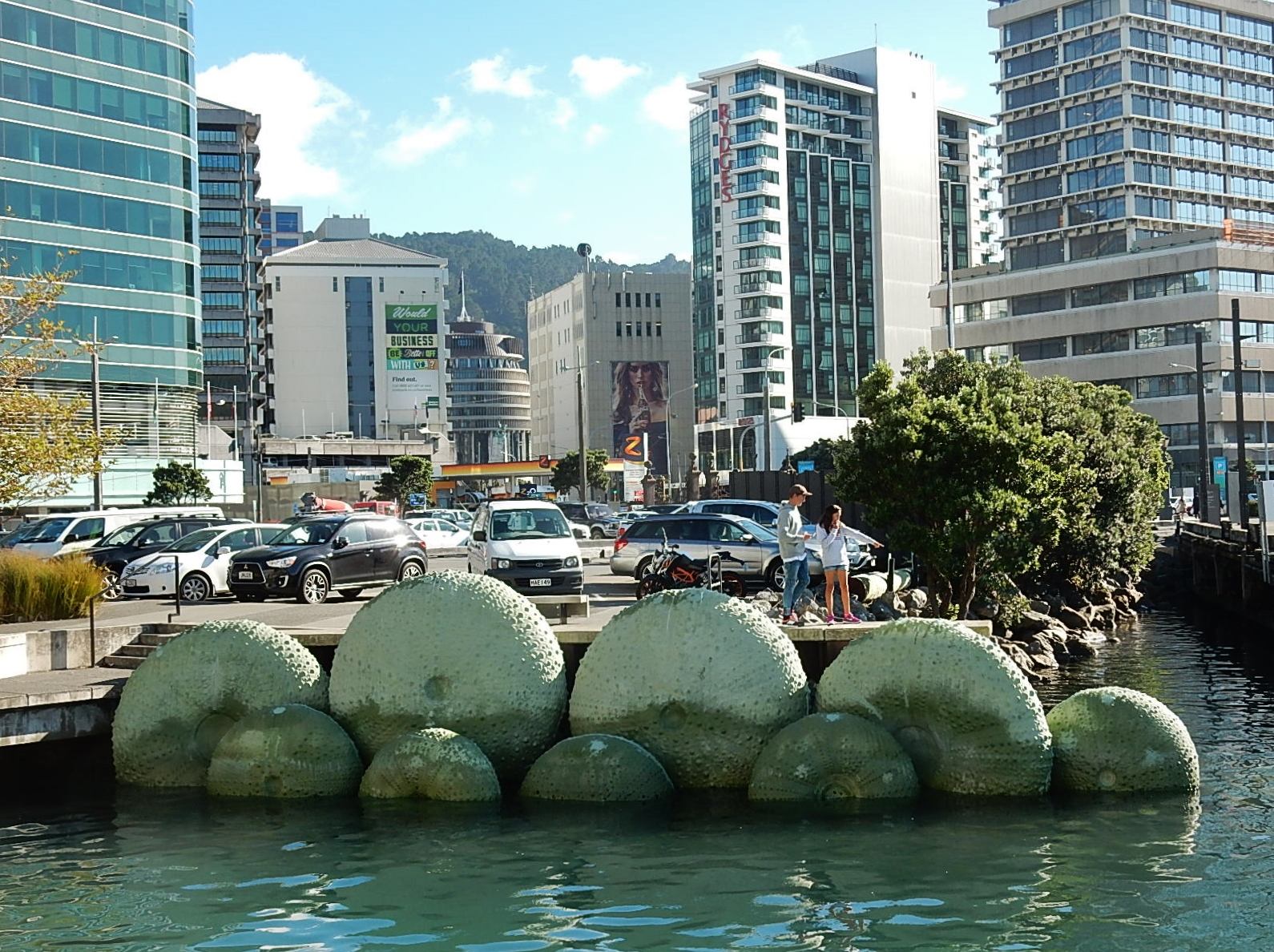
Ngā Kina sculpture next to Tug Wharf

In the early 20th century, ferry services were important for conveying people from localities around the harbour into the city. By 1911, Ferry Wharf had become congested, with six boats needing to berth there. In November 1911 the Harbour Board resolved to extend Ferry Wharf and build a new wharf 26 m (85 ft) long next to it to serve the ferries to Seatoun and Karaka Bay. A contract was signed in June 1912 but construction was delayed due to difficulties sourcing timber and by the 1913 Great Strike, so the wharf was not completed until 1914. By this time ferry services to Seatoun and Karaka Bay had ceased, but other ships and tugs used the new wharf. It was originally known as Ferry Wharf no. 2, but by the 1930s it was known as Tug Wharf.

By the 1970s, reclamation nearby meant the landward side of the wharf could not be used, and in 1971 a walkway was built which connected Tug Wharf to Queens Wharf along the newly reclaimed area. In 2007 Tug Wharf became part of the Kumutoto Precinct development, and a pedestrian bridge was built in 2008 to link the wharf to the rest of the promenade along the waterfront. Further development in 2018 linked the wharf to the north Kumutoto precinct with two short bridges.

In 2011, designer toilets nicknamed 'lobster loos' were opened between Tug Wharf and Queens Wharf. Ngā Kina, a sculpture of giant kina (sea urchins) by Michael Tuffery, was installed at the water's edge next to Tug Wharf in 2012.

=== Pipitea Wharf (1923) (former) ===
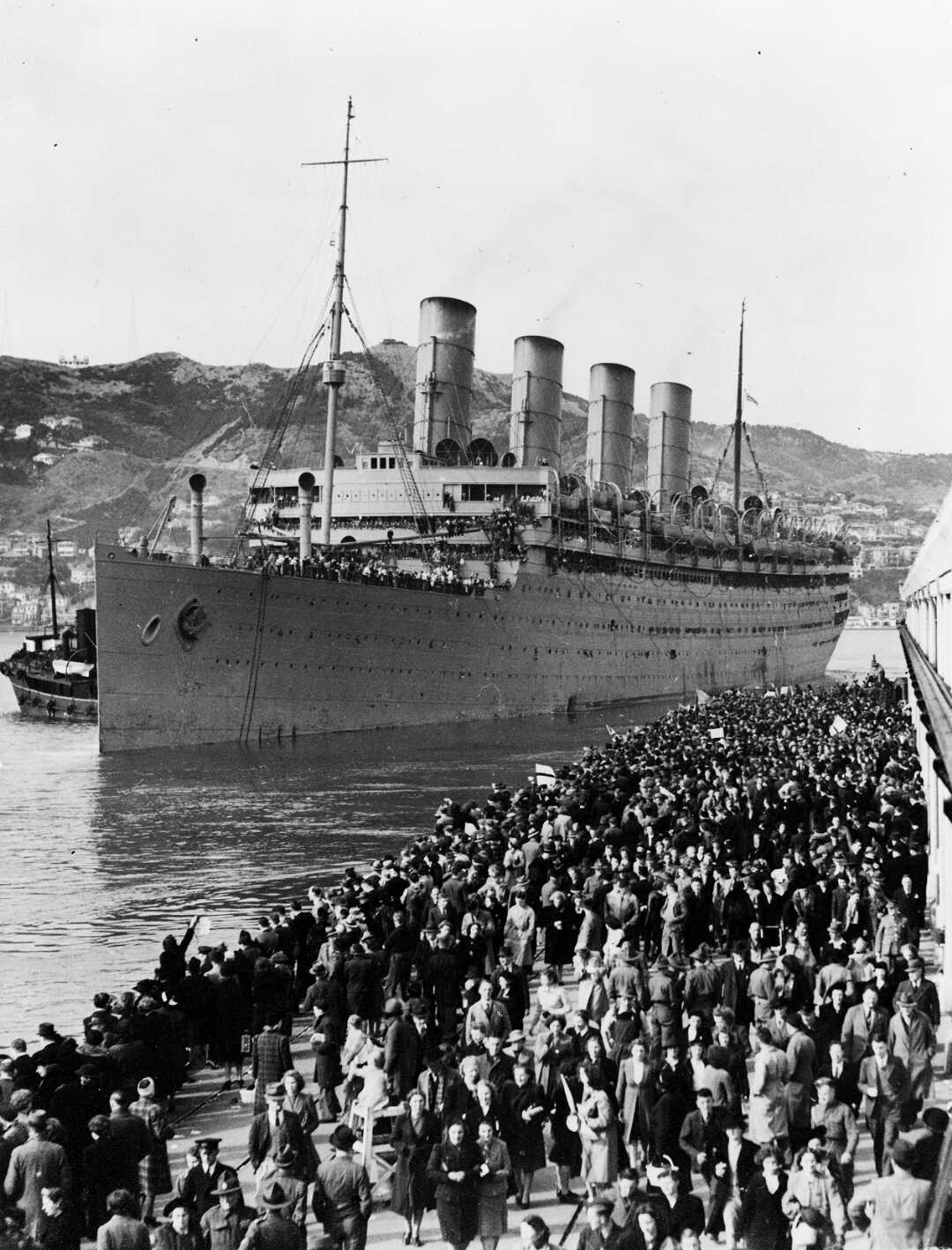
RMS Aquitania leaving Pipitea Wharf, Wellington – 2 May 1940

Pipitea Wharf is a former wharf in the inner harbour that was absorbed into the reclamation undertaken to create the Thorndon Container Terminal in the 1960s.

The Harbour Board announced a commitment to the new wharf in 1912. At that time it was proposed to be 180 m (200 yd) to the east of Kings Wharf, 180 m (600 ft) long and wider than Kings and Glasgow wharves. However, construction of the wharf was greatly delayed by the disruption and shortages of materials caused by World War I. The Board had called for tenders shortly before the outbreak of World War I, but had to withdraw the notice. A new notice calling for tenders for the construction of the wharf was eventually issued in June 1919. Steel reinforcing for the wharf did not arrive until 1920, and cement arrived in 1921. The final pier of the wharf was driven on 13 February 1923. The final dimensions of the wharf were 289 m (948 ft) on the northern side, and 57 m (186 ft) in width, making it the second largest structure of its kind in New Zealand at the time (behind Queens Wharf, Auckland). The Board elected to manage the construction of the wharf with its own resources and in 1923 reported that this had achieved a saving of 19% compared with the lowest tendered cost.

There was a major incident in June 1936 when the inter-island ferry TSS Wahine collided with the wharf while entering the port in dense fog. The bow of the vessel was extensively damaged.

During World War II, Pipitea Wharf was used for berthing large ocean liners that had been converted for use as troopships. One of these vessels was RMS Aquitania, of the Cunard line, the largest of the ocean liners to call into New Zealand during the war. The ship's draught of 11 m (36 ft) was a record for any port in New Zealand at that time. Pipitea Wharf was one of the berthing places for passenger vessels bringing assisted migrants to New Zealand in the 1950s and 1960s.

When the Thorndon Container Terminal was developed, Pipitea Wharf was part of the reclamation and became fully absorbed. However, in the 2016 Kaikōura Earthquake, the fill surrounding some of the remaining original wharf piles subsided by around 300 mm (12 in), leaving the tops of the piles exposed.

=== Jubilee floating dock (1932–1988) ===
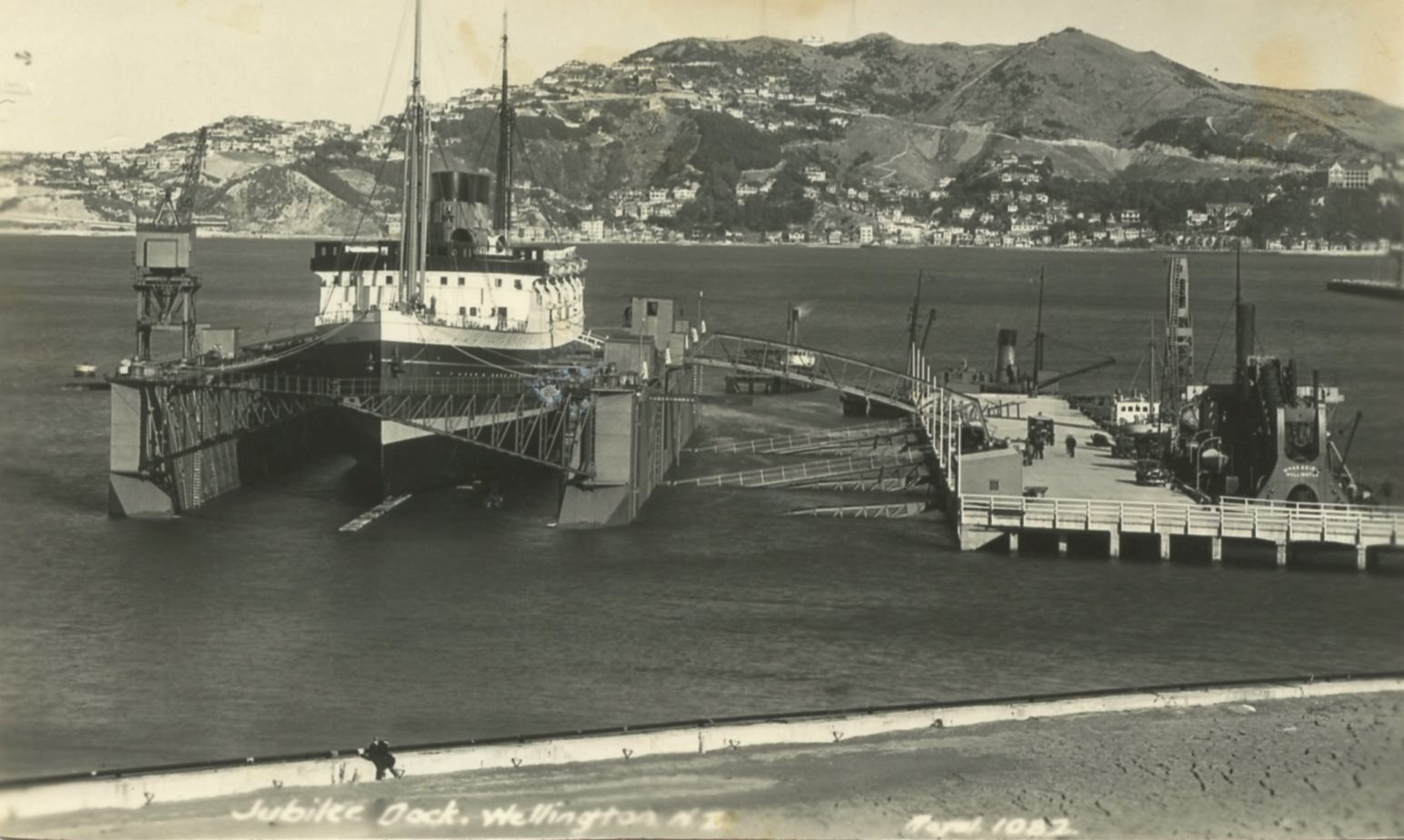
Jubilee Floating Dock c. 1935

In 1928, the Harbour Board announced a decision to procure and install a floating dock with a lifting power of 15,000 tons, to be used for ship repairs. The floating dock was built in England then towed for five and a half months at sea, covering 21,000 km (13,000 mi), and arrived in Wellington Harbour on 28 December 1931. The dock was 160 m (540 ft) long and 36 m (117 ft) wide, with a lifting capacity of 17,000 tons. It was powered by electricity and included a crane capable of lifting up to five tons. A wharf was built adjacent to the Thorndon reclamation for permanent mooring of the floating dock. The dock was named 'Jubilee Dock' in honour of the Harbour Board's fiftieth anniversary in 1930.

In 1988, the Harbour Board sold the floating dock to an engineering firm in Nelson, and it was then on-sold for use in Singapore. The dock was taken in tow from Wellington, but broke up and sank on 2 January 1989, only five days into the tow.

=== Kaiwharawhara Wharf (proposed) ===
From the 1960s, state-owned roll-on/roll-off passenger ferries to Picton, operated by KiwiRail and currently branded as the Interislander, have berthed at a terminal near Aotea Quay. StraitNZ, a competing privately owned company, operates its Bluebridge ferries from Glasgow Wharf. In 2020, following two years of discussion with stakeholders, Greater Wellington Regional Council announced that it had chosen Kaiwharawhara as its preferred site for a new wharf and ferry terminal. The terminal would be built on land owned by KiwiRail, CentrePort and the NZ Transport Agency. The new wharf would be able to accommodate the larger ferries that Interislander planned to introduce, and would replace the two separate facilities currently operated by the Interislander and StraitNZ. In addition, CentrePort would be able to make changes to the layout of its other port operations. The plan includes a wharf about 250 m (820 ft) long, a ferry terminal building, changes to road, rail and pedestrian access, and marshalling and loading areas. Resource consent was granted in January 2023. The panel that approved the project called it the biggest rail capital project since World War II.

Site preparation began, but the cost of the project increased significantly. In December 2023, the new Finance Minister, Nicola Willis, declined extra funding to KiwiRail for its proposed new ferries and terminal infrastructure, and the project stalled while the parties involved considered their options.

== Eastern side of Wellington Harbour ==
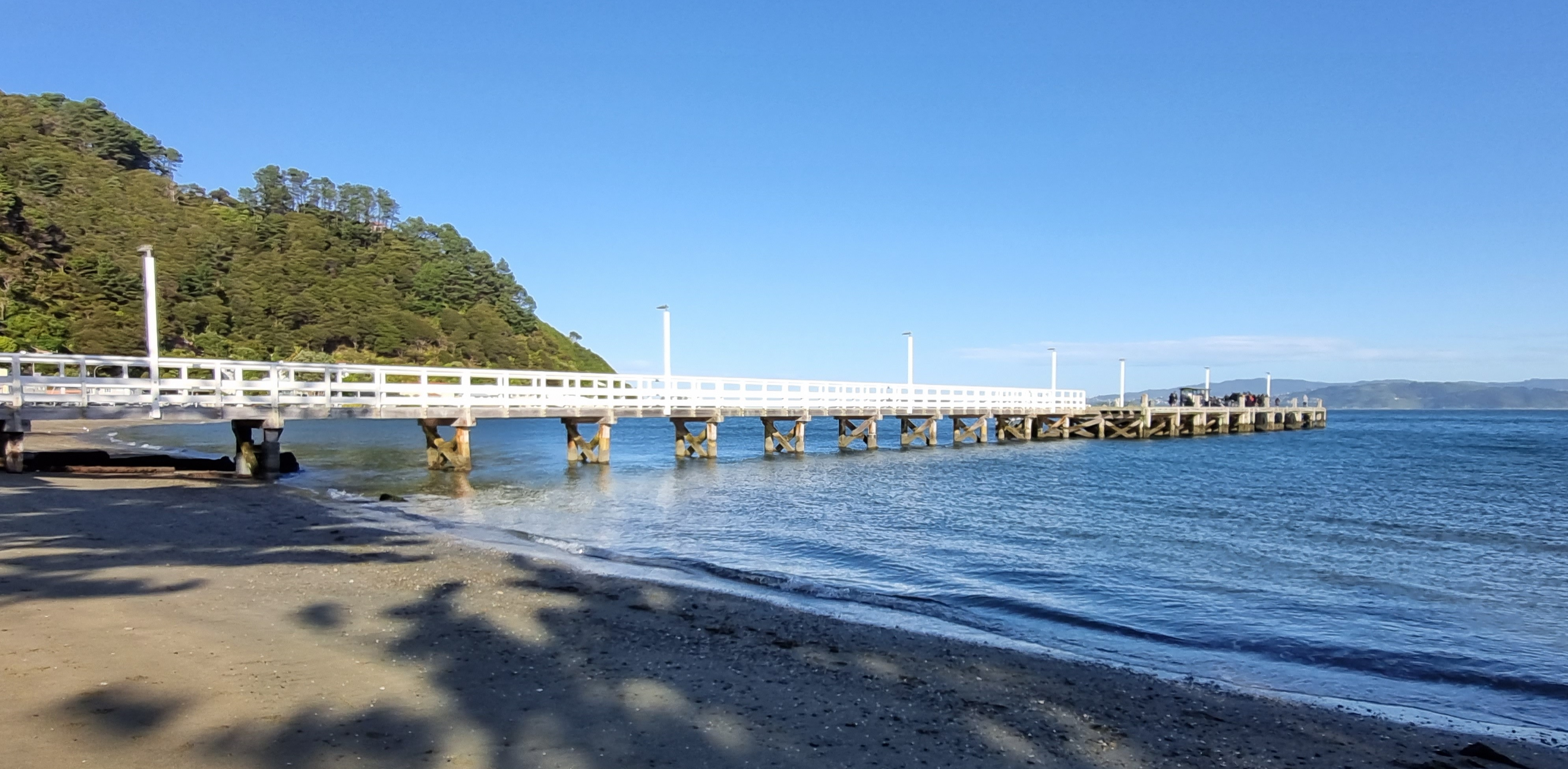
Days Bay Wharf

=== Days Bay Wharf (1895) ===
Days Bay Wharf was built in 1895 by Neil McLean for J. H. Williams to serve Williams' ferries bringing day-trippers across the harbour from Wellington city. Apart from benefitting day trippers, the wharf also improved access to bays on the eastern side of the harbour, which led to an increase in land values. In the early 20th century interest in Days Bay as an attraction decreased, and in 1905 Williams sold his shares to the Miramar Ferry Company which then formed into Wellington Harbour Ferries. The ferry company's lease on the wharf expired in 1909, and Wellington Harbour Board took ownership. Today the wharf is used by East by West Ferries to transport commuters and visitors and is a popular attraction for people visiting the beach. Days Bay Wharf is listed as a Category 2 Historic Place by Heritage New Zealand.

=== Rona Bay Wharf (1906) ===
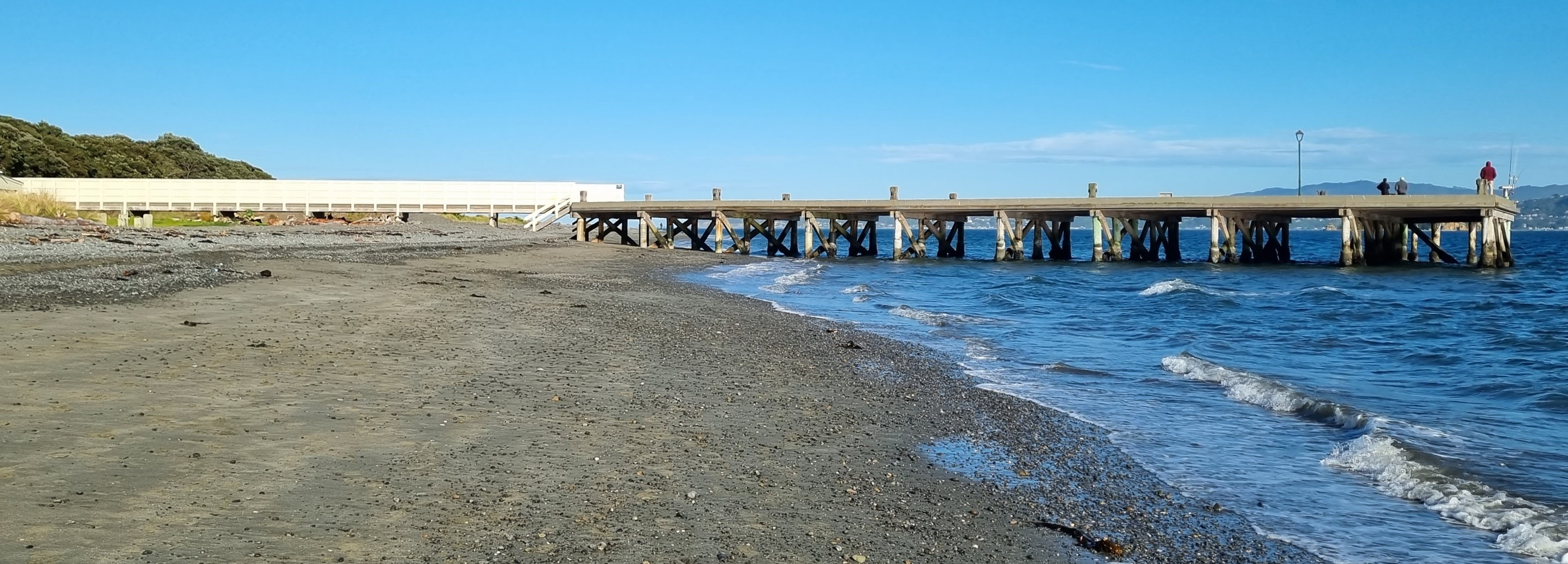
Rona Bay Wharf

Rona Bay Wharf was built for Wellington Harbour Board in 1906, with additions in 1908. The wharf has a bend in the middle. It was intended to serve passenger ferries, and also ships bringing supplies to the fast-developing area. In fact, few ships other than ferries used the wharf, and the ferry service ended in 1948. In 1960, the Harbour Board leased the wharf to Eastbourne Borough Council (now Hutt City Council). In the 1990s, Hutt City Council considered demolishing the wharf but after public opposition a trust was created to look after the wharf. After a restoration project costing $3.3 million, the wharf was re-opened in 2018.

=== Petone Wharf (1909) ===
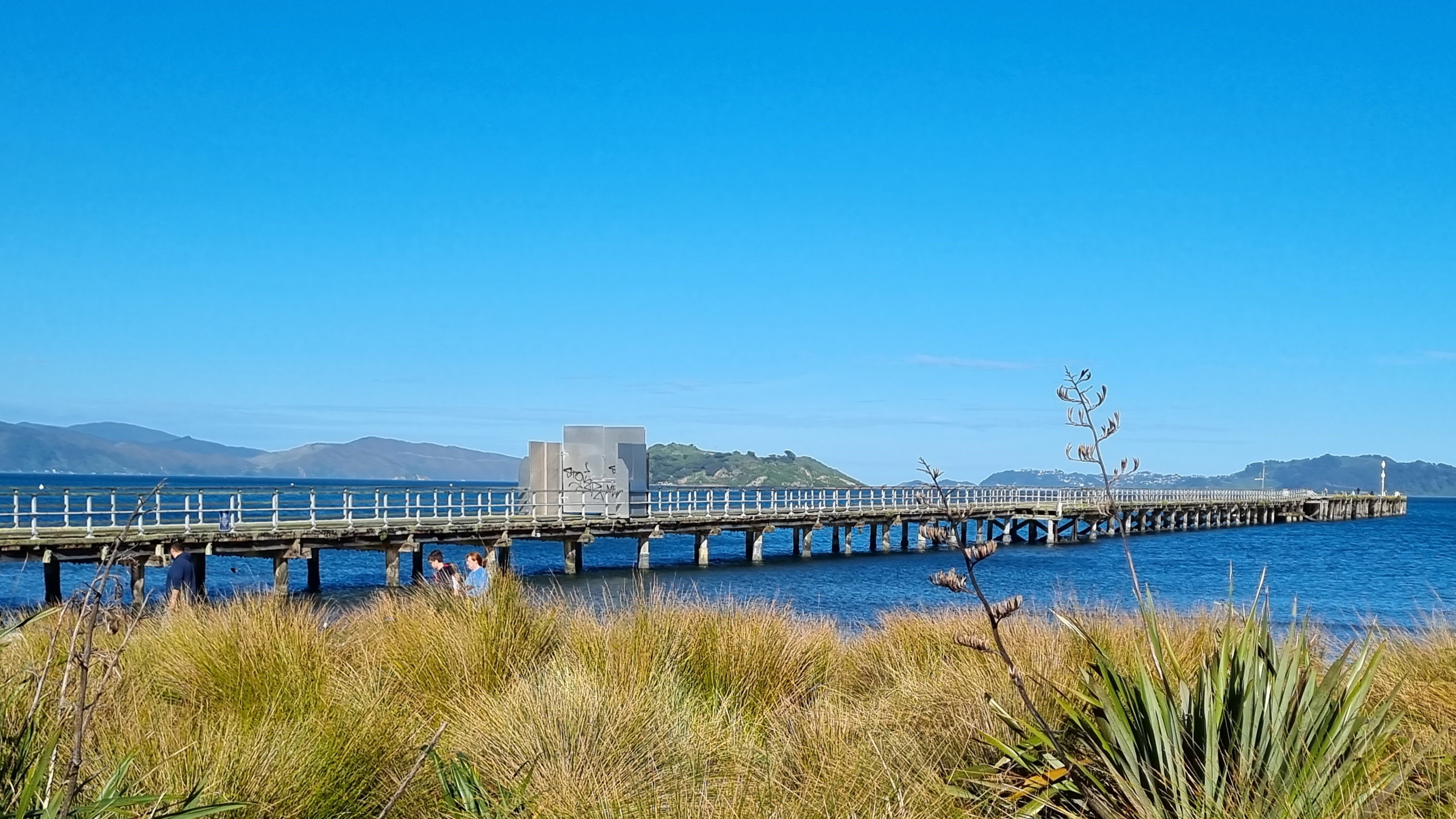
Petone Wharf, 2023

In 1883–1884 the Gear Meat Company built a wharf at Petone so that it could move its products quickly to Wellington for export. The company bought an old ship, the Jubilee, and moored it at the wharf to use as a freezing plant. When the ship was full it was towed across the harbour to Wellington and the meat transferred to other ships for transport to markets. The wharf deteriorated and was removed in 1902, and contractors for the Harbour Board built a new wharf slightly further east during 1908–1909. The wharf has been used intermittently by passenger ferries.

Petone Wharf was popular with walkers and people fishing, but was closed to the public in January 2021 after suffering earthquake damage in the 2016 Kaikōura earthquake and two smaller subsequent earthquakes, as well as damage from marine worms. In May 2021, Hutt City Council voted to repair the wharf but a year later the Council was still considering the best course of action. In November 2023, Hutt City councillors voted to demolish the wharf at a projected cost of $6 million. A local resident expressed concerns that demolishing the wharf would disturb the Waiwhetu Aquifer, but the Council stated that the advice they received from engineering consultants indicates that the aquifer would not be at risk if the wharf is removed. In February 2024, the 'Save Petone Wharf' protest group told Hutt City Council that new technology was available that would enable the wharf to be saved. Worm-damaged piles could be wrapped in laminate and the gap between the pile and the laminate filled with grout. There were significant protests from the community, including one event in April 2024 where over 1,000 people demonstrated their objections. In April 2025, following preparation of a report on options, Hutt City Council made provision in their ten year plan for $12 million for work on the wharf. In 2026 a contract was signed with GK Shaw for a partial restoration of the wharf and work began in October. The scope included repair of the first 290 m (950 ft) of the wharf and improving seismic resilience, followed by repair of 60 m (200 ft) of the wharf head, and demolition of the remaining 50 m (160 ft) that was found to be in "particularly poor condition".

=== Point Howard Wharf (1930) ===
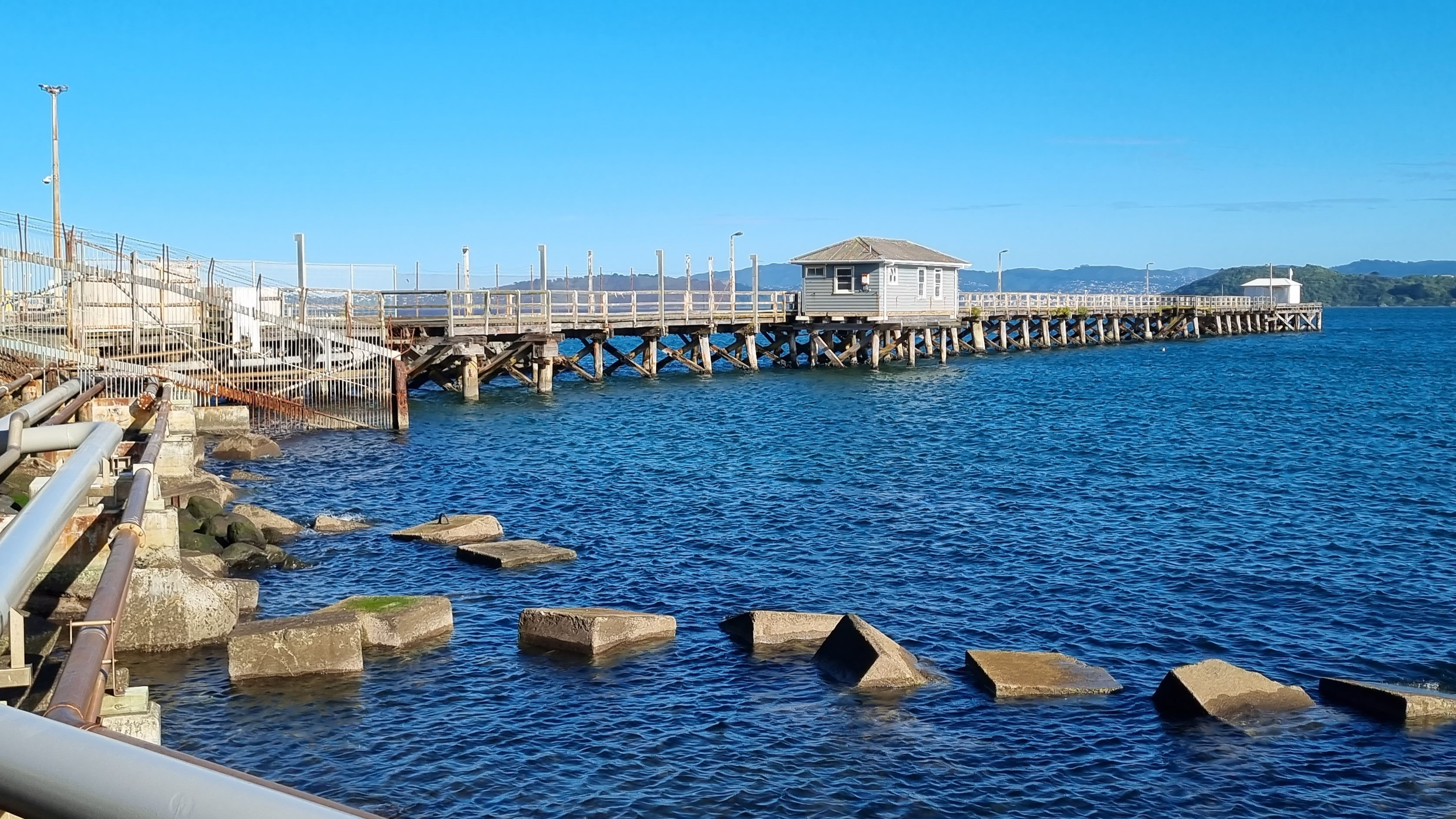
Point Howard Wharf in 2023. At left is the oil pipeline to tanks at Seaview.

After Seaview was identified as a site for oil storage, the Texas Oil Company (Texaco, later Caltex) bought five acres in 1929 and built oil storage tanks. In the same year the Harbour Board started work on construction of a new oil wharf at Point Howard. The original wharf was made from hardwood logs and is 169 m (554 ft) long. As the wharf was not to be used to offload general cargo, it was designed with an approach that was only 4.3 m (14 ft) wide, much narrower than a normal wharf. The wharf was completed in March 1930 and initially used by only limited numbers of tankers, but expansion of related industries in Seaview saw demand for the wharf increase. In 1933 the wharf was extended by adding a 159 m-long (522 ft) tee-shape across the end. In the 1970s Point Howard Wharf was replaced as an oil wharf by Seaview Wharf, and by the 1980s it was only used occasionally, by chemical tankers. After the disestablishment of Wellington Harbour Board in 1989, ownership of the wharf passed to Hutt City Council.

The tee at the end of the wharf was removed in 2013 due to deterioration. Point Howard Wharf was closed to visitors in 2018 after further damage to the piles was discovered. Engineers have cautioned against demolition of the wharf because it is possible that disruption of the piles might cause major damage to the Waiwhetu Aquifer which supplies almost half of Wellington's fresh water. (The aquifer was pierced during construction of the wharf in 1929.)

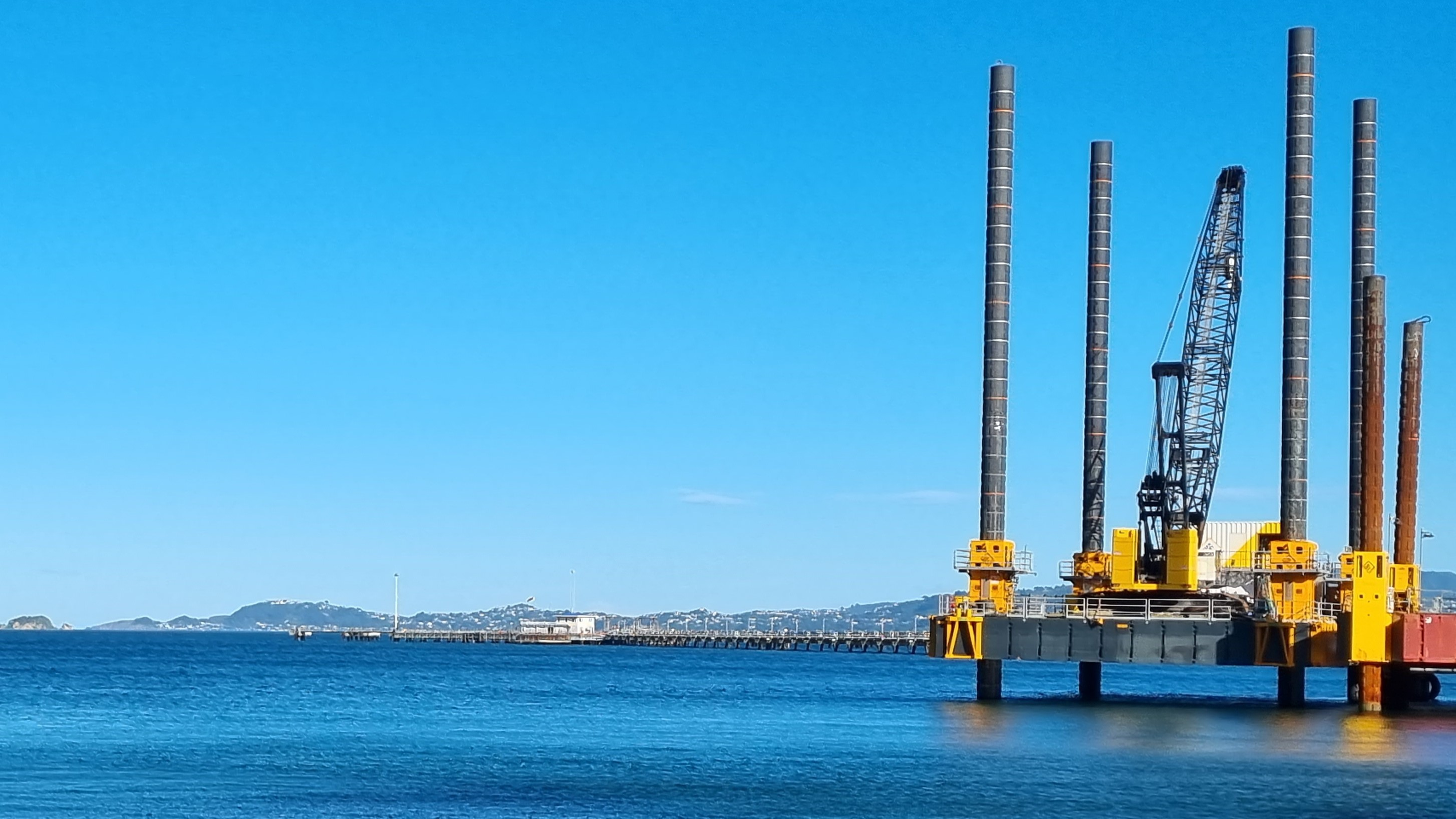
Seaview Wharf in 2023, with work being carried out to improve earthquake resilience

=== Seaview Wharf (1977) ===
Seaview Wharf at Point Howard, Seaview, is owned and maintained by CentrePort and serves a fuel terminal, replacing the older Point Howard Wharf. Planning for the construction of Seaview Wharf began in the mid-1960s, and the wharf began operating in 1977. The Seaview fuel terminal is the main point of supply for liquid fuels for the lower North Island and is also a backup point of supply for other parts of the North Island. The landward end of the wharf is at Point Howard, and the wharf is approximately 600 m (2,000 ft) long. Fuel pipelines along the wharf connect with bulk fuel storage facilities in Seaview. The fuel terminal handles approximately one million tonnes of fuel annually.

In 2001, the wharf was equipped with an impressed current cathodic protection scheme to help prolong its life. The wharf was damaged in the 2016 Kaikōura earthquake, but was able to continue operating. A 2019 report published by the Wellington Lifelines Project included an observation that following a major earthquake:

Fuel is critical to run generators, earth-moving plant and for the transport of residents around the region. There will likely be significant roads outages preventing fuel tankers getting into the region, therefore a robust refuelling and storage facility for fuel is critical.

In 2021 a $60m project commenced to improve the seismic resilience of the wharf.

== Matiu / Somes island ==
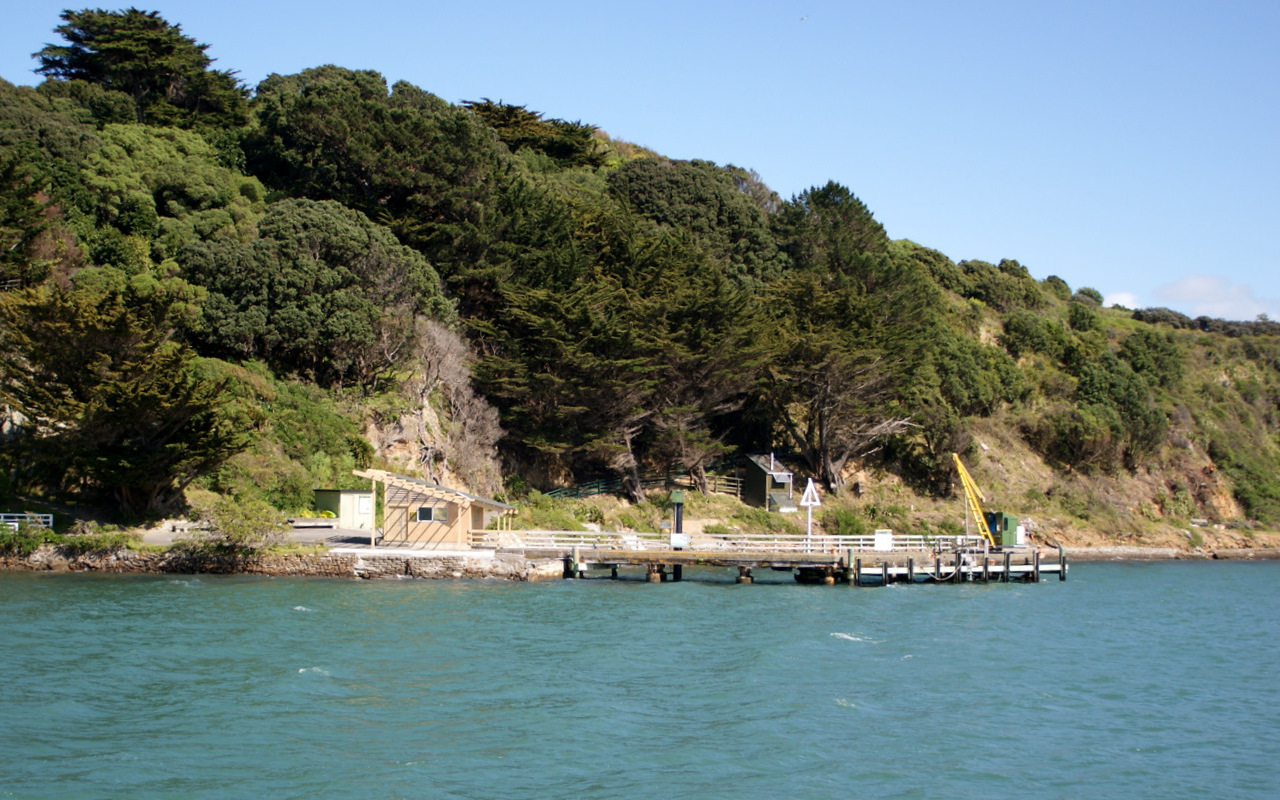
Matiu / Somes Island Wharf

In 1904, an early wharf at Somes Island was reported to be in poor condition. The Minister of Public Works reported to Parliament in September 1908 that a new wharf had been erected at Somes Island. The current small wharf, built around 1948, is used by visitors to the island, including East by West ferries which has a regular service for tourists.

In January 2024, the Kaitiaki Board governing the island announced that public access to the island would be closed for 6–8 months while the wharf was rebuilt.

== Evans Bay ==
=== Evans Bay Patent Slip (1873–1980) ===
A patent slip and associated jetty wharves were built in Evans Bay for servicing vessels of up to 2000 tons. The Patent Slip was commissioned in 1873. After over 100 years' service, the slipway closed on 31 July 1980. The site was demolished and various equipment scrapped, sold or given to museums, and land was filled in for a new housing subdivision. The site was listed as a Category 2 Historic Place in 1982. Wellington City Council rezoned the site as a heritage area in 2003, and the area is now known as Cog Park.

=== Miramar Wharf (1901) ===
Miramar Wharf is situated on the Miramar Peninsula at the head of Evans Bay. Miramar Wharf was funded by the Crawford family and built in 1901 by Neil McLean. In 1909–1910 the wharf was altered and extended, and at the same time a concrete seawall was built to the south and land reclaimed behind it. Tram tracks were laid from the wharf through the newly created Miramar Cutting to the Miramar Gas Works so that coal could be unloaded more efficiently. The wharf was further lengthened in 1921. In November 2015 the wharf, now owned by CentrePort Wellington, was closed due to deterioration of the piles.

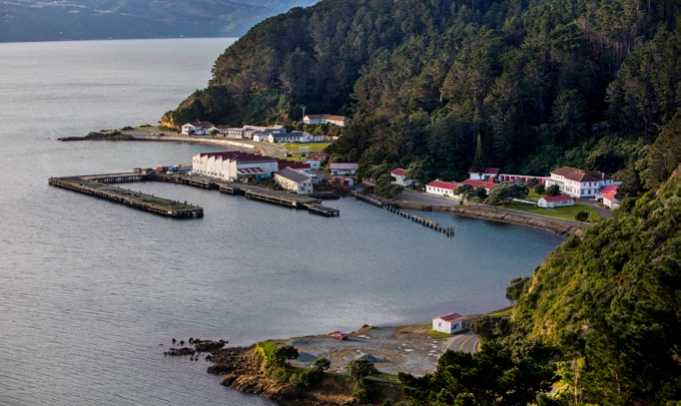
Shelly Bay, showing three fingers of the wharf

=== Shelly Bay Wharf (1902, 1940s) ===
In 1886, the Crown took over land at Shelly Bay for defence purposes and in the following years it became the site for an anti-submarine mine depot which included a wharf. The wharf was extended in 1902. In 1907, the base was transferred to the Royal Navy, which constructed a new wharf. The wharf complex was expanded during World War II. Ownership of the base including the wharf was transferred to the Royal New Zealand Navy after its creation in 1941 and then to the Royal New Zealand Air Force in 1946. TEAL flying boats used the wharf in the 1950s. The air force base closed in 1995 and since then parts of the wharf have rotted away through lack of maintenance. Shelly Bay was the site of a proposed major residential development, but the project was cancelled in September 2023, and the land sold to Peter Jackson and Fran Walsh.

=== Burnham Wharf (1927) ===
Burnham Wharf is an oil wharf located near Miramar Wharf at the head of Evans Bay. It was built for the British Imperial Oil Company and opened in 1927. The wharf is operated by CentrePort. Aviation fuel for Wellington Airport is delivered by ship to Burnham Wharf and is then piped to the airport. The 2019 Wellington Lifelines Project reported that the wharf and the fuel infrastructure were reaching the end of their design lives and were both vulnerable in an earthquake.

=== Flying boat jetty (1951) ===
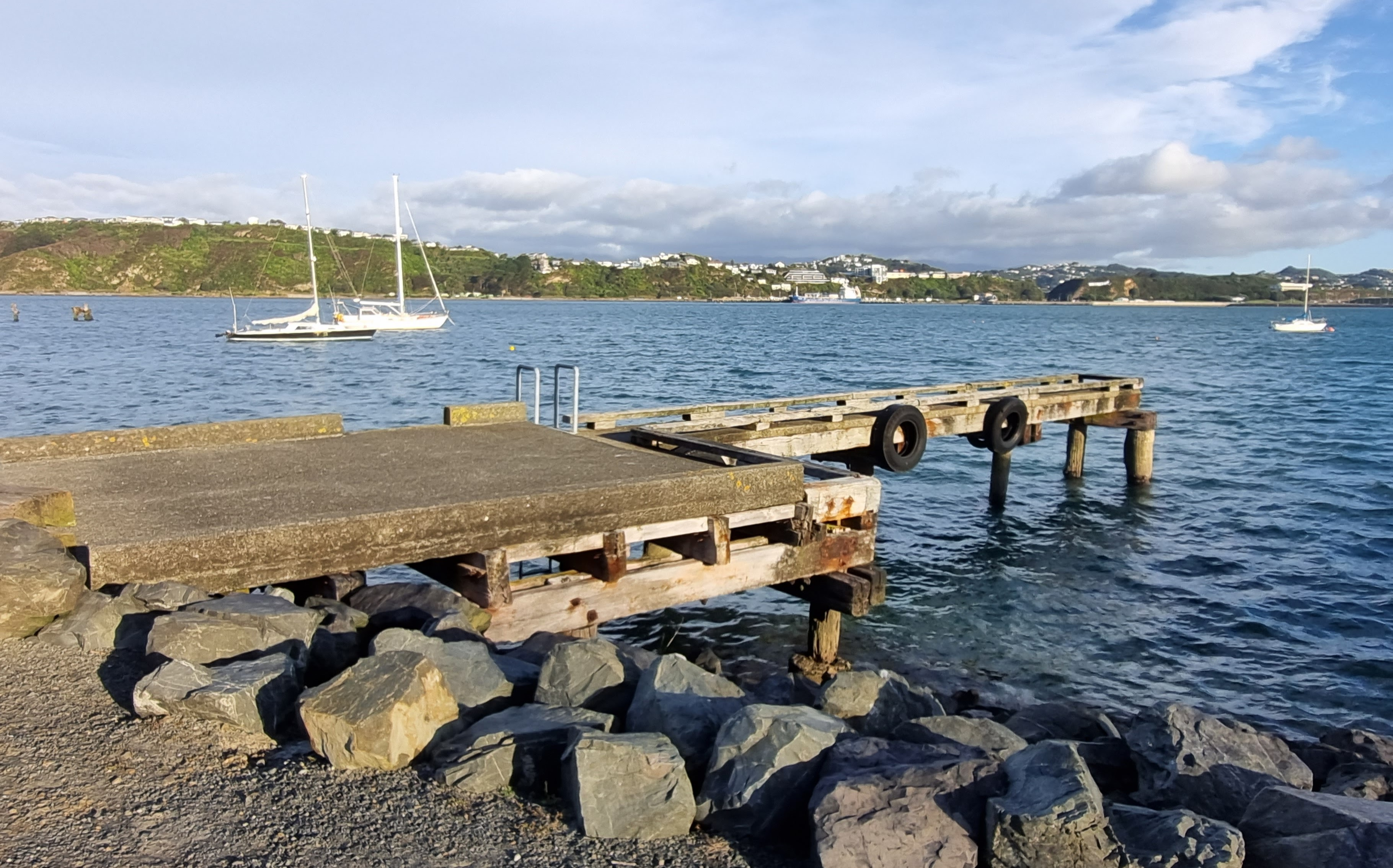
Flying boat jetty, with Miramar peninsula in distance

A small jetty was built at Evans Bay in 1951 to serve a short-lived international flying boat service, at what is now Cog Park.

In the months before the jetty was constructed, passengers were transported by launch between the shore and the flying boats, but in 1951 the jetty was built and connected via a gangway to a floating U-shaped pontoon made of 124 large square steel tanks connected together and ballasted with water and oil. The pontoon was 110 ft long and 74 ft wide. The flying boat service to Australia ended in 1954, and in 1957 the 400-ton pontoon structure, known as a 'Braby pontoon', was winched on to land, dismantled and transported in pieces to Auckland by road and rail, to be reused by the Air Force at Hobsonville Air Base.

In November 2023, Wellington City Council announced that it intended to repair the jetty. The project would cost $500,000, but an anonymous donor had agreed to pay about half of that cost. Some city councillors raised concerns about the spending, given the Council's difficult financial position at the time of the announcement. The work is expected to take several months, but may be delayed if little penguins (kororā) are found at the site. Wellington City Council has asked the Department of Conservation for permission to relocate any penguins in the way of the project. A tender for the work was awarded in June 2024. The jetty is not heritage-listed but the Council intends to give it some heritage protection after the repairs are completed.

== Entrance to Wellington Harbour ==
=== Mahanga Bay Wharf (1886 – 1962) ===
During the 1870s and 1880s there were fears of a Russian attack on New Zealand. Defensive measures were taken around the country, including construction of Fort Ballance which was built during 1885–1886 at Point Gordon above Mahanga Bay. Mahanga Bay Wharf was built in 1886 to support the fort. Submarine mines were laid in the harbour. These could be detonated from the shore, so a tide gauge was erected at the wharf for accurate measuring of the depth of the water between the mines and a potential target vessel. A tramway was laid from the wharf to the fort in 1904, and the wharf was extended in 1906. Although the wharf was under military control, vessels taking the public on excursions were sometimes permitted to berth at the wharf. After World War II the wharf became neglected and was a danger to the public, so the Harbour Board and Defence Department agreed to demolish it, and in 1962 divers from the Royal New Zealand Navy blew up the wharf.

=== Seatoun Wharf (1901) ===
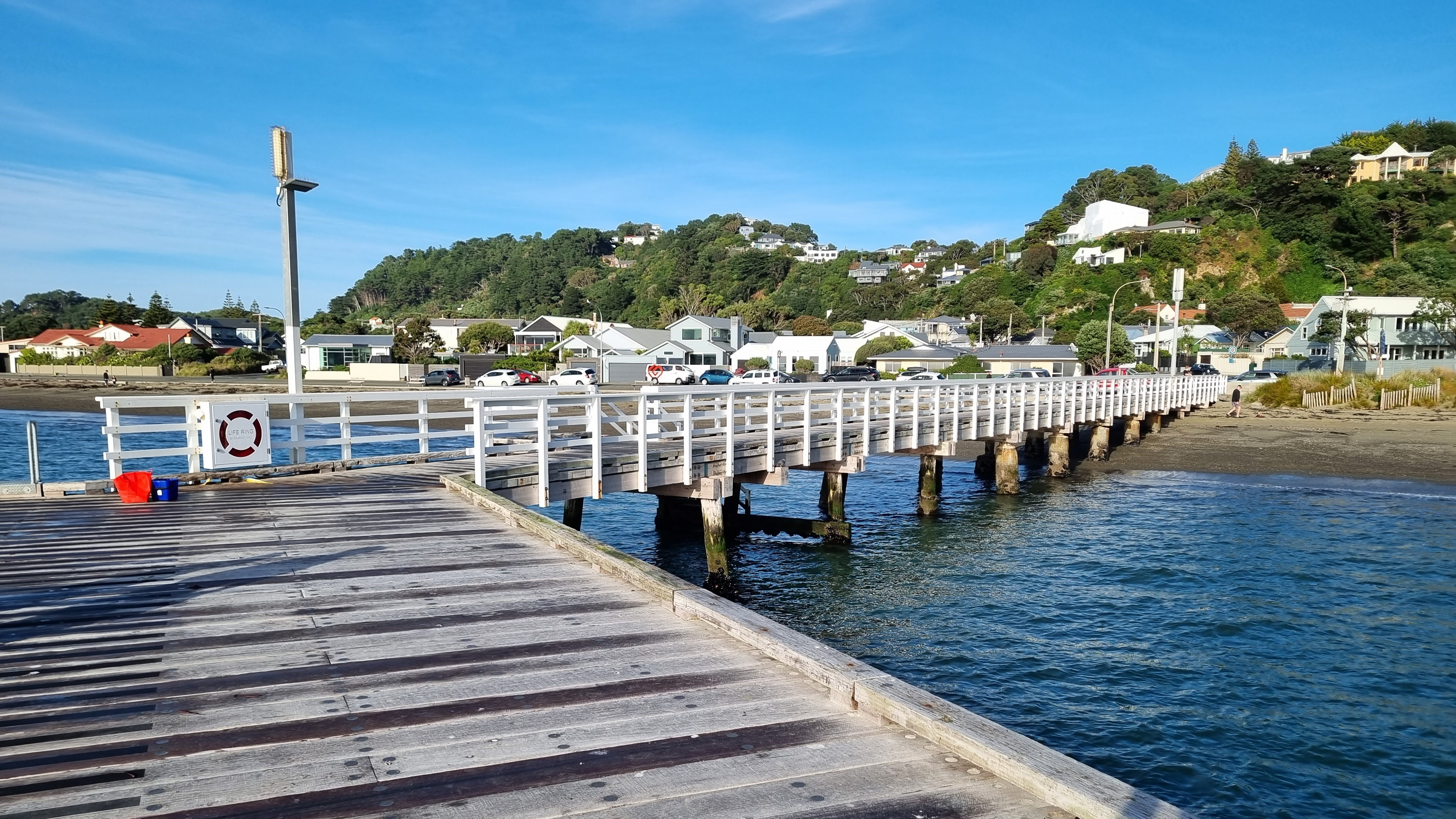
Seatoun Wharf

The Seatoun Roads Board was formed in 1880 to agitate for improved transport to Seatoun and promote development in the area. It helped build Seatoun Wharf, which opened in 1901. The main part of the wharf is 67 m (220 ft) long and the end, which bends to the left, is 30.5 m (100 ft) long. Ferries transported residents between Seatoun and Customhouse Quay in the city. Demand for travel by ferry collapsed after the Seatoun tunnel opened in 1908 and a tram service commenced. The ferry service ceased in 1913. From the 1990s, East by West ferries ran a service in the harbour that sometimes included stops at Seatoun. In 2021 Wellington City Council closed the wharf for 18 months for major repairs, and when it reopened East by West Ferries stated that they would no longer offer a service to Seatoun. The ferry company cited "increased running costs, passenger volumes, and scheduling issues" as the reason for the cancellation, saying that only one of their boats was able to berth at Seatoun in all tides.

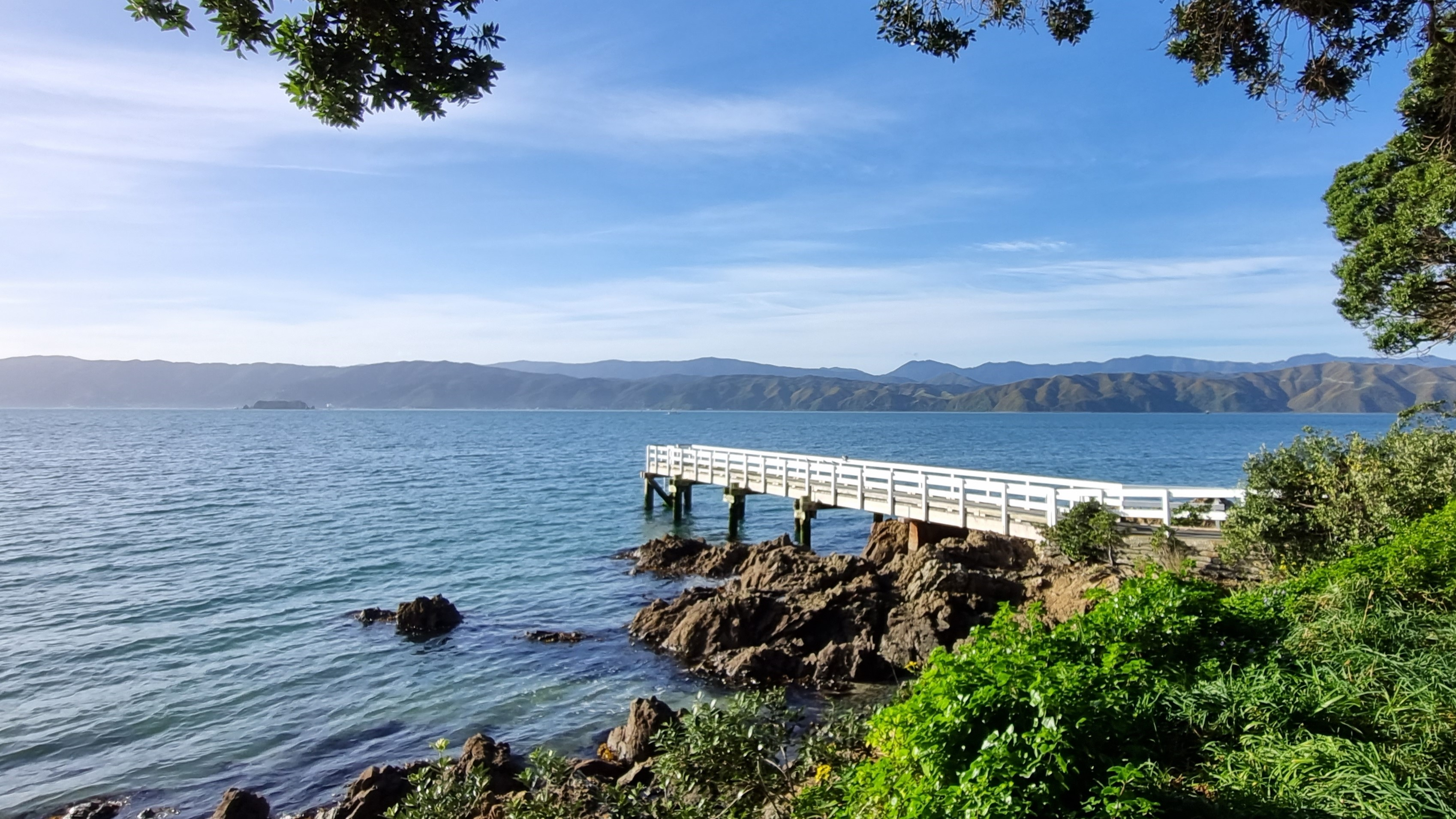
Karaka Bay Wharf

=== Karaka Bay Wharf (1901) ===
Karaka Bay Wharf was built in 1901 by Neil McLean for the Seatoun Roads Board, in an effort to encourage settlement in the area. Ferries took local people to and from the city, but after the Seatoun tunnel was built and trams came to the area demand for the ferry decreased, and the ferry ceased operating in 1913. Apart from a brief period in the 1920s when ferries ran again, the wharf has not been used since except by people fishing and swimming. The wharf used to be about twice as long as it is today, with a wide platform at the end. In 2002, the remaining section was damaged in a storm and needed major repairs. The wharf is managed by Wellington City Council.
