= Lobster loos =

Public toilets in Wellington

Coordinates: 41.283783°S 174.778374°E

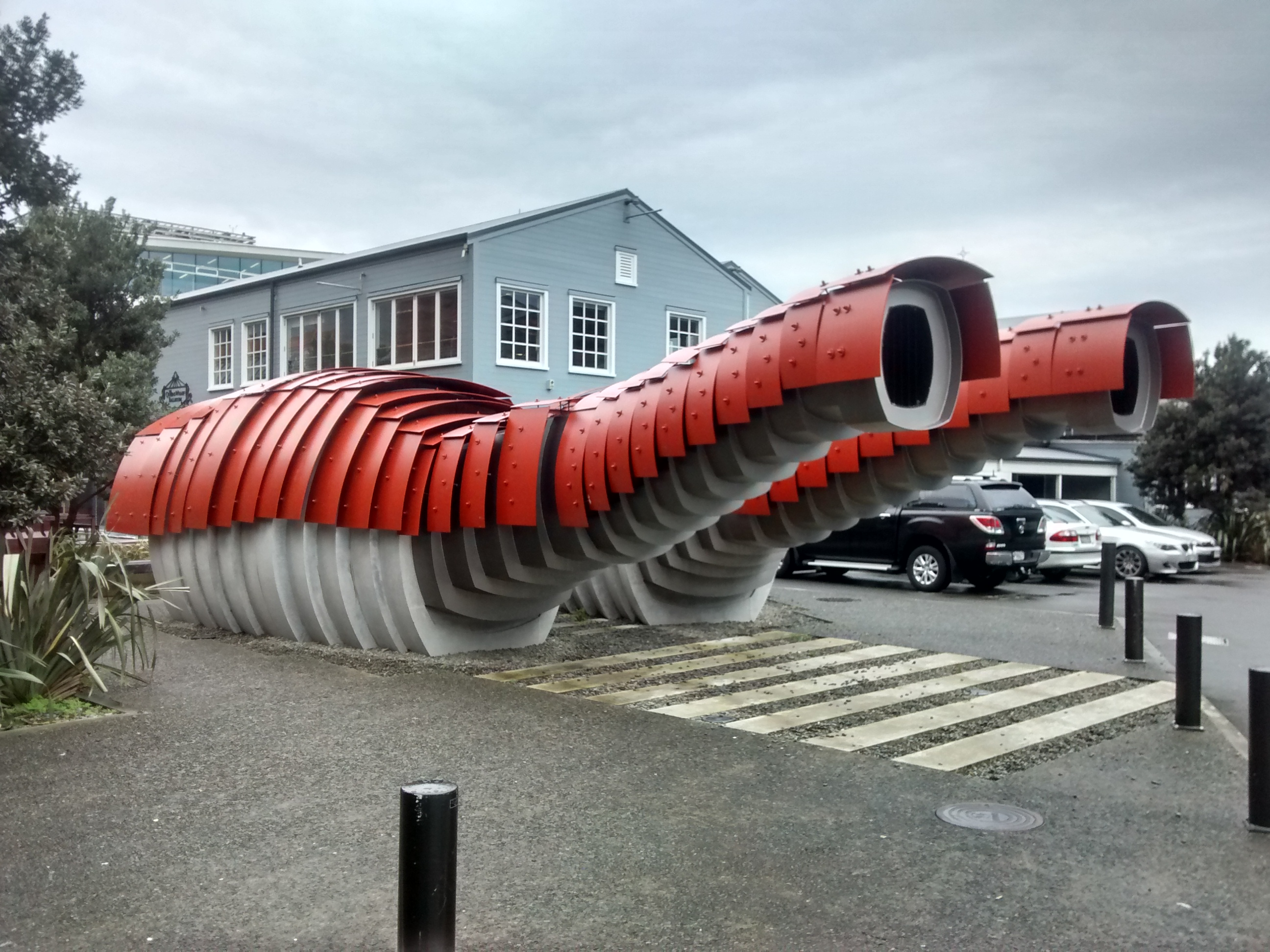
The lobster loos in August 2015

The lobster loos are iconic public toilets in Wellington, the capital city of New Zealand. They are part of the Kumutoto public space near Queen's Wharf on the Wellington Waterfront. They are formed from two concrete 'tentacles' covered over by a red-orange steel shroud. Updraft through the tentacles provides natural ventilation. The toilets were designed by Bret Thurston of Studio Pacific architects and cost $375,000 to build, twice as much as an ordinary facility. They were commissioned in August 2011.The toilets won a design award at the 2012 Wellington Architecture Awards and have been the subject of international interest.

The unofficial name "lobster loos" caused some controversy because of Māori cultural objections to the mixing of food and toileting in the name.

As of 2026, the toilets are open 7:00am to 11:00pm.

== See also ==
- The Bucket Fountain
