= Point Howard =

Suburb of Lower Hutt, New Zealand

Point Howard Ngaumatau
- Suburb
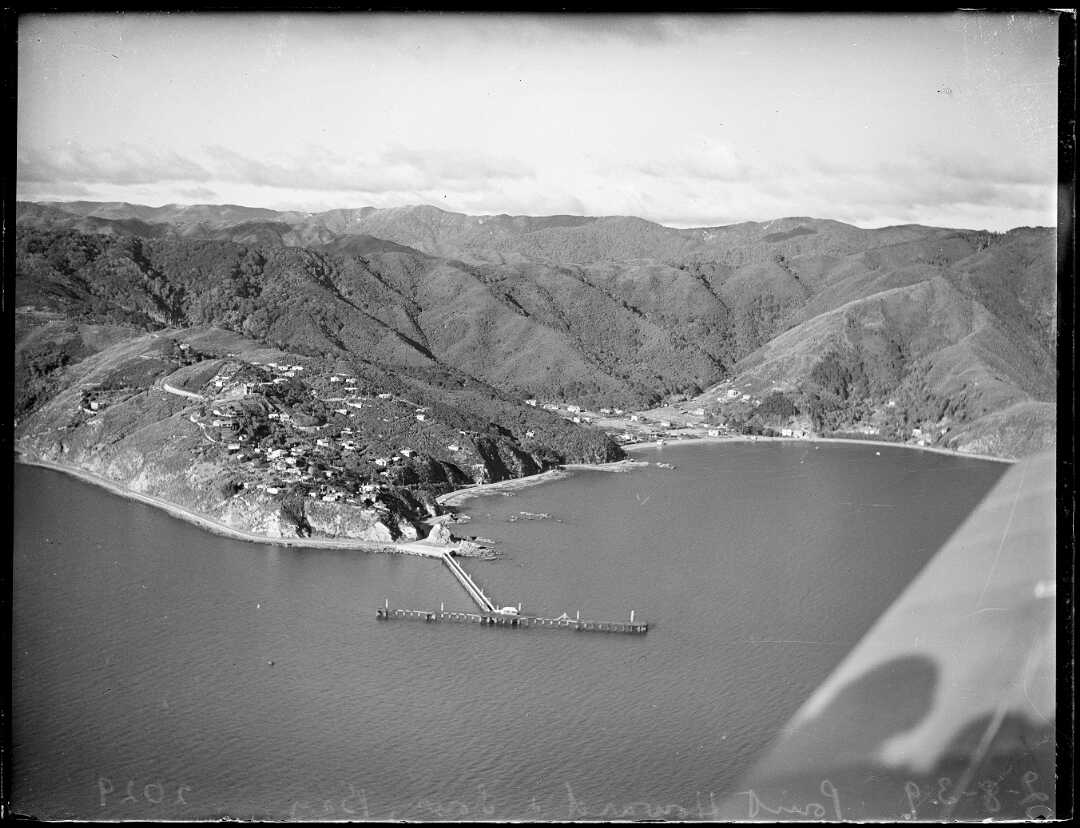
- Point Howard and Lowry Bay, 1939
- Interactive map of Point Howard
- Coordinates: 41.251°S 174.907°E
- Country: New Zealand
- Region: Wellington Region
- Territorial authority: Lower Hutt
- Ward: Harbour
- Community board: Eastbourne Community Board
- Electorates: Hutt South; Ikaroa-Rāwhiti (Māori)

Government
  - Territorial Authority: Hutt City Council
  - Regional council: Greater Wellington Regional Council
  - Mayor of Lower Hutt: Ken Laban
  - Hutt South MP: TBD
  - Ikaroa-Rāwhiti MP: Cushla Tangaere-Manuel

Area
  - Total: 0.47 km^{2} (0.18 sq mi)

Population (2018 Census)
  - Total: 363
  - Density: 770/km^{2} (2,000/sq mi)

Point Howard is a suburb on the eastern side of Wellington Harbour, in Lower Hutt, New Zealand.

== Geography ==
Point Howard is a headland and bay situated near the swamp land around Waiwhetū and the estuary of Hutt River. It is the first of a series of bays on the eastern side of Wellington Harbour which wind their way to the Pencarrow headland. Māori legends and oral history record the hills in this area being clad in rare New Zealand beech forest which reached down to the shoreline.

== Pre-European settlement ==
Māori were first associated with the Eastern Bays around 1400. The Wellington area (Whanganui-a-Tara) was occupied by Ngati Tara around 800 years ago and they were in turn supplanted by Ngāti Ira and their Rangitāne allies connected to the Ngati Kahungunu whose lands stretched into Wairarapa and Hawke's Bay. Between 1820 and 1840 they competed for control of the land with Ngāti Mutunga and Ngāti Toa from North Taranaki and after losing several battles the Ngāti Toa supported the iwi of Ngāti Tama and Ngāti Rangatahi in their occupation of lands around the Hutt Valley. By 1840 Ngati Toa Rangitira was the dominant iwi in the Wellington region. During this period the Eastern Bays were sparsely inhabited and primarily used as fishing grounds. The major Māori pā in the area was at Waiwhetu and land access to the eastern bays was by a steep track which ran up the long sloping ridge named Ngaumatau ('bite of the fishhook') by Ngāti Ira. Te Atiawa chief Puakawa was killed in his garden at Ngaumatau shortly after the arrival of European settlers in the ship Tory in 1839.

== European colonisation ==
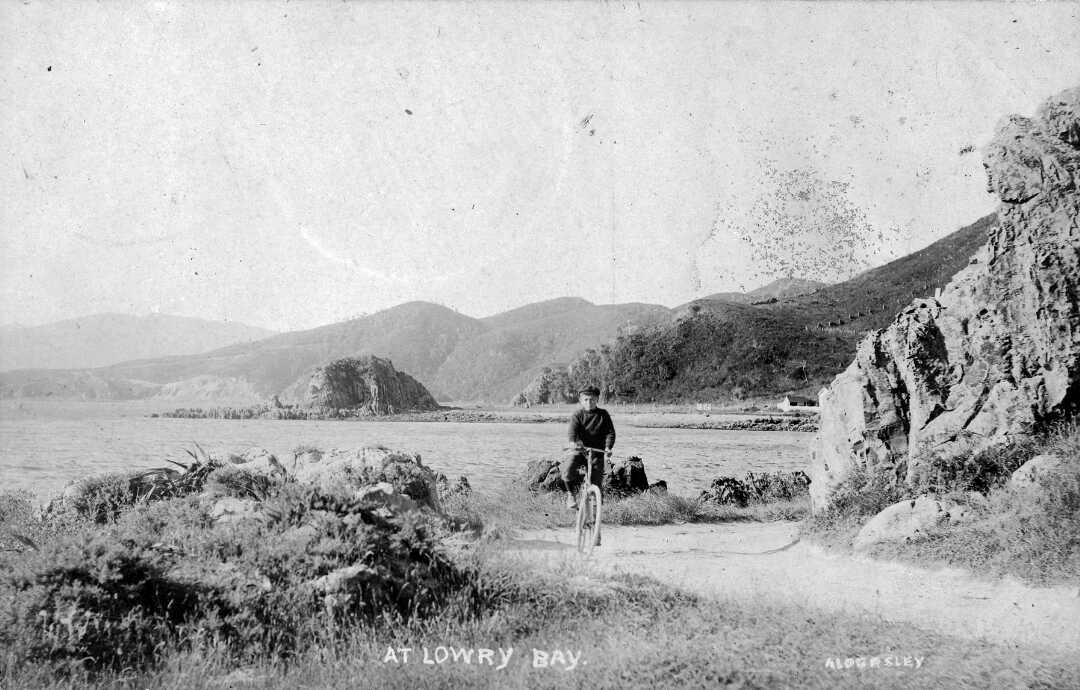
Point Howard viewed from the south point of Mahina Bay c. 1910

The first Europeans to visit the bays were probably whalers and traders but European colonisation of Point Howard began with the 1826 survey of Wellington Harbour by Captain James Herd on board the ship Rosanna. This was followed by Colonel William Wakefield and the New Zealand Company's choice of the harbour for their first settlement and the arrival of the first settlers in 1839, on board the ship Tory. Captain Chaffers named the headland next to Lowry Bay, Point Howard, after Philip Howard, a member of the New Zealand Committee Association. Point Howard was originally part of Lowry Bay but remained undeveloped by Europeans for most of the nineteenth century. The Wairarapa Earthquake of 1855 was a significant event as it saw the land around the estuary uplift by nearly two metres to create land access along the base of Point Howard and was the beginning of road access to the southern bays.

Hugh Sinclair of Wainuiomata, owned much of the land around Point Howard, and in 1877 he laid out plans for a subdivision which included multiple access roads. Few sections were sold in the initial offer and the development was abandoned. By 1891, the land was still part of Lowry Bay and owned by the wealthy lawyer Dillon Bell. In 1905 legal requirements of Bell's family trust forced the subdivision of his land. The Lowry Bay Estate Company was formed to subdivide the northern section which included current Point Howard. Thirty-six subscribers brought 1000-pound shares to qualify for a ballot for the prime sections but it was 1920s before all the sections were sold. By 1938 there were 29 houses on the whole estate.

In 1907 the Hutt County Council began work on widening and constructing a properly formed road around the Eastern Bays and after the Second World War, better roads and cars increased its popularity as a picnic destination and home for wealthy Wellingtonians. The Hutt Council erected a bathing shelter across from Point Howard beach in 1926.

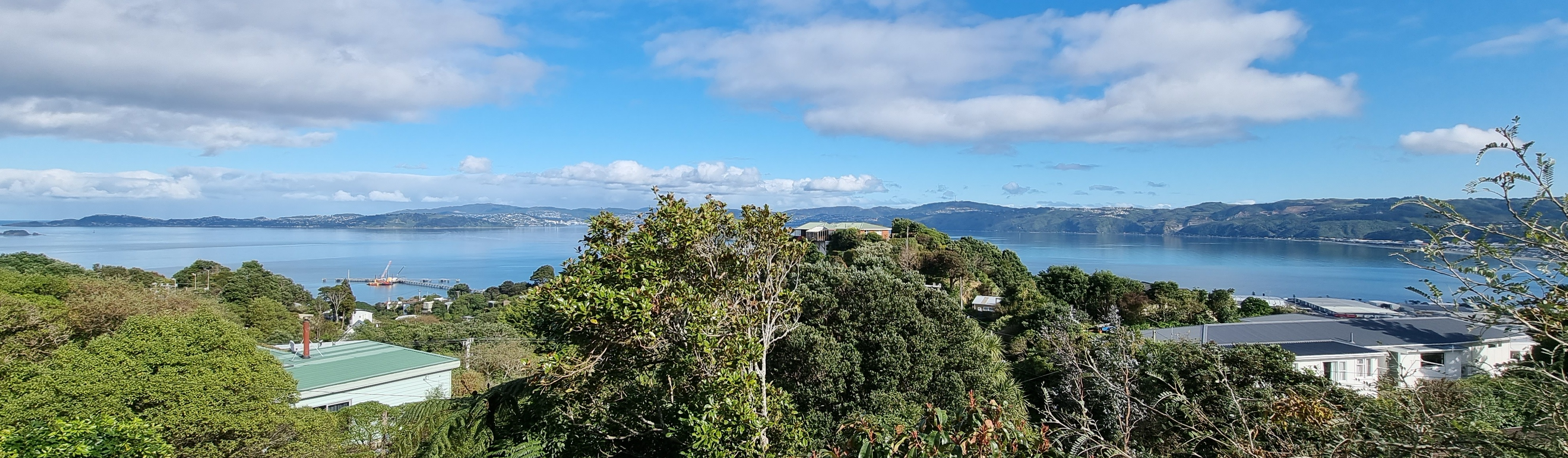
Point Howard (Ngaumatau), Wellington, New Zealand, 2022

== Industrial expansion ==
An expansion of industrial sites at Seaview on the northern approach to Point Howard in the 1920s led to major developments for the suburb. After Seaview was identified as a site for the storage of oil, the Texas Oil Company (Texaco and later Caltex) bought five acres in 1929 and built oil storage tanks. In the same year the Harbour Board started work on construction of a new oil wharf at Point Howard. The original wharf was made from hardwood logs, 80 to 90 feet (24 to 27 m) long. As the wharf was not being used to offload general cargo it was designed with an approach that was only 14 feet (4.3 m) wide, much narrower than a normal wharf. The wharf was completed in March 1930 and while limited numbers of tankers used the wharf initially, expansion of related industries in Seaview saw more demand for use of the wharf. In 1930, the Vacuum Oil Company completed major works on their petroleum and kerosene works on Seaview Road and their two 750,00-gallon petroleum tanks were connected by an 8-inch pipeline with the Point Howard Wharf. In 1933 the wharf pilings were joined to extend the width of the wharf to cater for demand. In February 1934, the largest oil tanker to visit New Zealand, Texas Company's Australia, berthed at Point Howard wharf with her load of two million gallons of petroleum.

Up until the 1930s the Eastern Bays were reliant on rainwater or access to a stream for drinking water, but in January 1932 work began on the area's water and sewage infrastructure. As this coincided with the depression years men on relief wages were employed to excavate a site at the top of Point Howard for a new reservoir to supply the Eastern Bays with water.

== Demographics ==
Point Howard covers 0.47 km^{2} (0.18 sq mi) It is part of the larger Eastern Bays statistical area.

Historical population
Year	Pop.	±% p.a.
2006	378	—
2013	333	−1.79%
2018	363	+1.74%
2023	372	+0.49%

Point Howard had a population of 372 in the 2023 New Zealand census, an increase of 9 people (2.5%) since the 2018 census, and an increase of 39 people (11.7%) since the 2013 census. There were 189 males and 189 females in 153 dwellings. 3.2% of people identified as LGBTIQ+. There were 45 people (12.1%) aged under 15 years, 42 (11.3%) aged 15 to 29, 174 (46.8%) aged 30 to 64, and 108 (29.0%) aged 65 or older.

People could identify as more than one ethnicity. The results were 92.7% European (Pākehā); 8.1% Māori; 2.4% Pasifika; 3.2% Asian; 1.6% Middle Eastern, Latin American and African New Zealanders (MELAA); and 5.6% other, which includes people giving their ethnicity as "New Zealander". English was spoken by 98.4%, Māori by 1.6%, Samoan by 0.8%, and other languages by 12.1%. No language could be spoken by 1.6% (e.g. too young to talk). The percentage of people born overseas was 29.0, compared with 28.8% nationally.

Religious affiliations were 24.2% Christian, and 0.8% other religions. People who answered that they had no religion were 64.5%, and 8.9% of people did not answer the census question.

Of those at least 15 years old, 186 (56.9%) people had a bachelor's or higher degree, 108 (33.0%) had a post-high school certificate or diploma, and 33 (10.1%) people exclusively held high school qualifications. 105 people (32.1%) earned over $100,000 compared to 12.1% nationally. The employment status of those at least 15 was 165 (50.5%) full-time, 51 (15.6%) part-time, and 3 (0.9%) unemployed.
