= Holland Tunnel Gallery =

Coordinates: 41°30′6.5″N 74°0′41″W

Holland Tunnel Gallery was a contemporary art gallery operating from two locations, Newburgh and Paros.

== History ==
Holland Tunnel Gallery was founded in 1997 by Dutch artist and curator Paulien Lethen. The gallery operated from a Home Depot garden shed at Lethen's Williamsburg home. Holding up to six people at a time, it was observed by a New York Times critic to be New York City's "smallest gallery open to the public." Art critic Roberta Smith described the gallery as "One of the quirkiest spaces in Williamsburg".

In 2000 a second location for the gallery opened on the Greek island of Paros in a historic merchant building owned by Lethen and her sister and musician, Heleen Schuttevaêr.

The Williamsburg location ceased operation in 2019 after Lethen established a new location in Newburgh in 2018 at 46 Chambers Street in a converted civil war era townhouse.

Lethen and Schuttevaêr published a history of the gallery in 2014. A short documentary about Lethen and the Holland Tunnel Gallery called Requiem for Williamsburg was directed by Dutch filmmaker Yara Hannema.

Notable artists to feature in exhibitions at Holland Tunnel Gallery include Bix Lye (son of Len Lye), Vivien Collins, Jan Mulder, Thornton Willis, Mark Gibian, Tadashi Hashimoto, and Joel Carreiro. The gallery held its final exhibition in November 2023, a retrospective of works by Lethen. In August 2025, the exhibition Reclamation: Lost and Found in Newburgh marked a return of activity to the Chambers Street site and a temporary reactivation of the Holland Tunnel name.
