= Te Wharewaka o Pōneke =

Building on Wellington waterfront

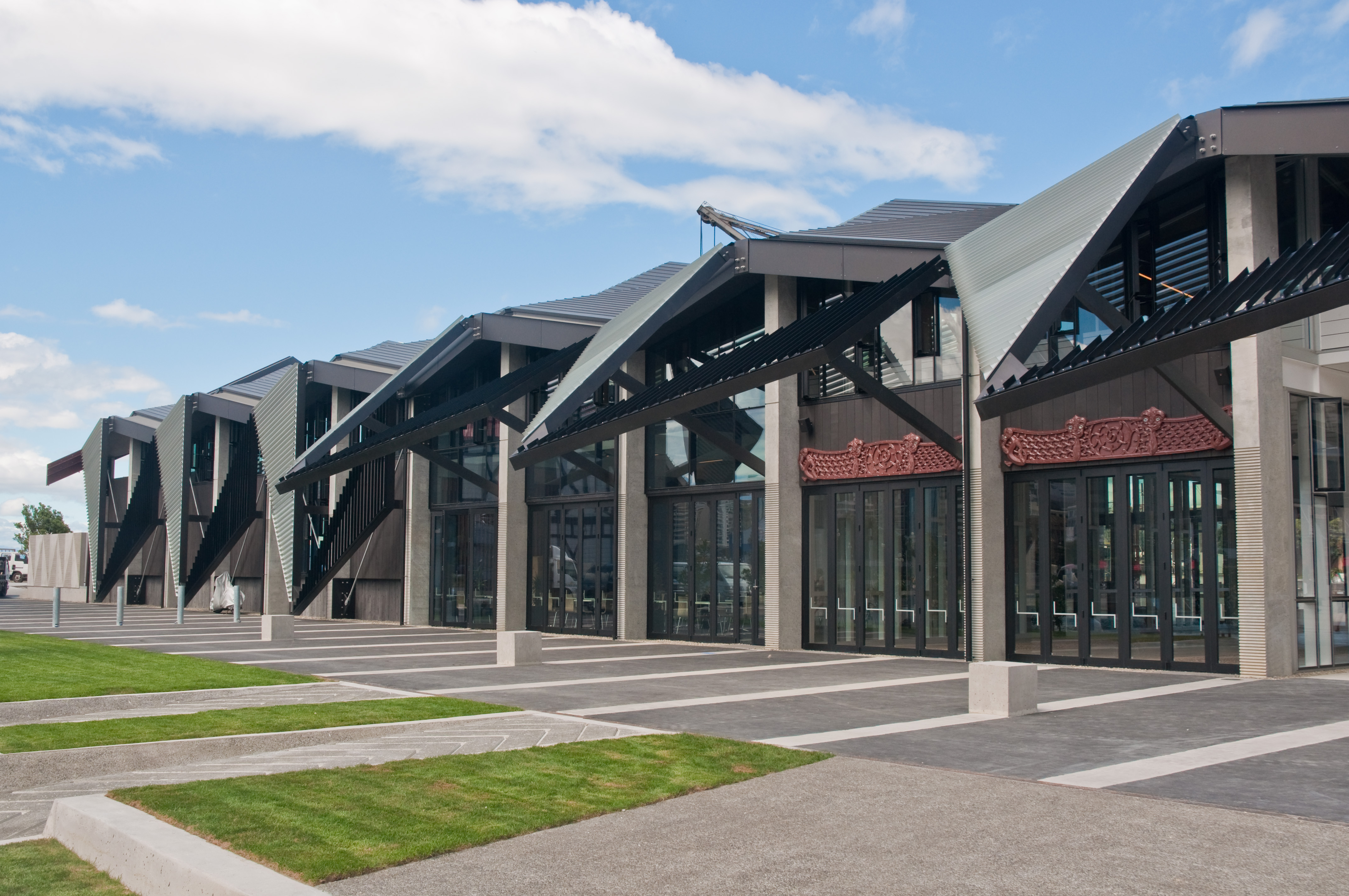
- Interactive map of the Te Wharewaka o Pōneke area
- Alternative names: Te Raukura

General information
- Location: Taranaki Street Wharf, Wellington Waterfront
- Coordinates: 41°17′21″S 174°46′47″E
- Opened: 6 February 2011

Design and construction
- Architecture firm: architecture +

Website
- wharewakatours.maori.nz

Te Wharewaka o Pōneke ("the waka house of Wellington"), full name Te Raukura – Te Wharewaka o Pōneke, is a building located on Taranaki Street Wharf, Wellington, New Zealand. It is situated immediately adjacent to Whairepo Lagoon, between Frank Kitts Park and the Museum of New Zealand Te Papa Tongarewa. The building houses a conference venue, a café and a waka house and was officially opened on 6 February 2011.

Te Wharewaka o Pōneke is built on reclaimed land close to the harbour frontage of the historic Te Aro Pā, one of the largest Māori communities in Wellington up until the 1880s. A charitable trust owns the building and provides cultural and educational activities from the facility. These include walking tours that show the history of Wellington from the earliest explorers to the present day, waka tours, and presentations for primary and secondary school groups. In 2025, the travel magazine Lonely Planet rated the waka tours operated from the building in the list of top 10 things to do in Wellington.

== History ==
Land between Queens Wharf and Taranaki Street Wharf in Wellington Harbour was reclaimed from 1969, allowing creation of Frank Kitts Park and Whairepo Lagoon and closing in the landward side of Taranaki Street Wharf. In 1989, two historic rowing club buildings, the Star Boating Club and Wellington Rowing Club, were moved to the reclaimed area adjacent to Whairepo Lagoon. The initial concepts for the development of the national museum Te Papa on the Wellington waterfront announced in 1990 included provision for a lagoon for waka, but the final design for Te Papa did not facilitate a suitable connection with the harbour.

In 2002, Wellington Waterfront Limited began transforming the Taranaki Street Wharf area into a public space, and undertook the development of the wharewaka building as a joint initiative with Taranaki iwi. Te Wharewaka o Pōneke was built on reclaimed land between the wharf and the lagoon, immediately to the south of the two rowing club buildings. The wharewaka is of special significance to the Māori collective Taranaki Whānui ki Te Upoko o Te Ika comprising descendants from Taranaki iwi of Te Ātiawa, Taranaki, Ngāti Ruanui, Ngāti Tama and Ngāti Mutunga. The building is located close to the harbour frontage of the historic Te Aro Pā, one of the largest Māori communities in Wellington up until the 1880s. (Note: Some archaeological remains of the Te Aro Pā from the 1840s were discovered during redevelopment work on a property in lower Taranaki Street in 2005. The remains are classified as a Category 1 Historic Place, and have been preserved for display to the public.) The wharewaka building sees the re-establishment of a Māori presence on the waterfront.

Te Wharewaka o Pōneke was officially opened at a dawn ceremony on Waitangi Day, 6 February 2011. It houses several waka as well as a café and conference rooms.

The building cost $12.5 million, funded by a Government contribution of $7 million, a further $1 million from Wellington City Council, and the balance from loans from several Māori trusts. It is owned and operated by the Wharewaka o Pōneke Charitable Trust, representing the Port Nicholson Block Settlement Trust, the Wellington Tenths Trust, the Palmerston North Reserve and Wellington City Council.

== Design ==
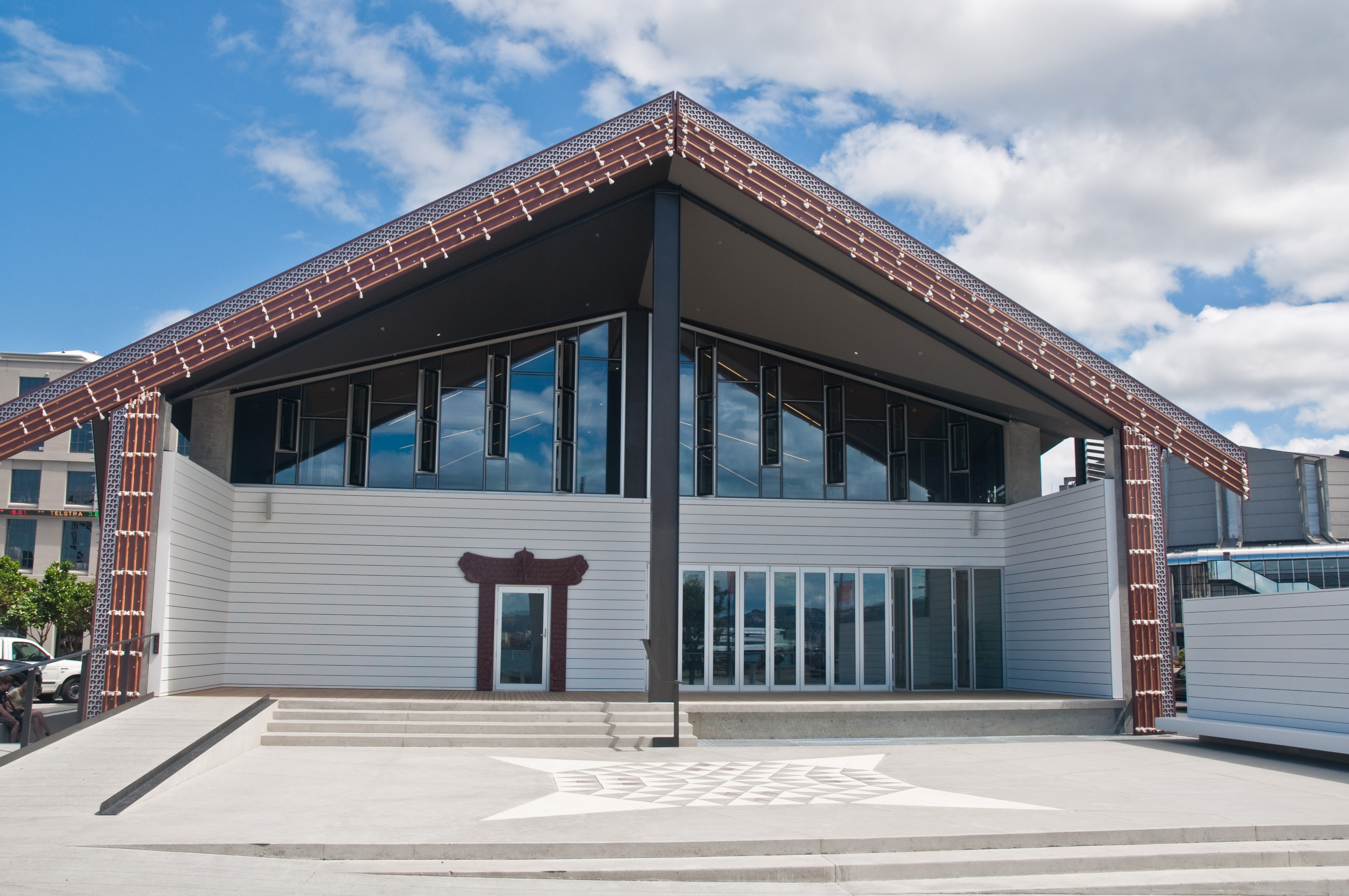
The entrance to the conference centre side of the building

The building was designed by the Wellington firm architecture+, and early design work commenced around 2001. The layout of the building follows some aspects of the design of wharenui. The entrance faces north-east, and includes bargeboards carved by Rangi Kipa. One of the design challenges was that the building would be viewed from all sides, whereas a Māori wharenui is typically seen primarily from the front. The early design work undertaken by Māori architect Mike Barnes conceived the building as representing a human body wearing a korowai or cloak. The korowai has been implemented with abstract triangular forms of the roof that appear to have been pulled down over the building. The design included a function centre, a café, and a whare (house) for waka.

The building uses controlled natural ventilation for cooling, and air-conditioning has been avoided to minimise energy consumption. The insulation in the roof is twice the requirements of the building code, and together with the double glazing minimises solar heat gain. Heating is provided by in-slab heating pipes supplied by a heat exchanger operating on seawater from the adjacent lagoon.

In 2015, Stuart Gardyne, a director of architecture+, was awarded the NZIA Gold Medal for career achievement by the New Zealand Institute of Architects for a body of work including the wharewaka.

== Awards and recognition ==
Te Wharewaka o Pōneke was one of the winners in the public architecture category of the 2011 NZIA Wellington Architecture Awards. It also won the category for: ‘Enhancement or Protection of the City’s Built Environment’ in the Wellington Civic Trust Awards 2011. The building was one of the winners in the commercial architecture category of the 2012 NZIA New Zealand Architecture Awards.

== Waka ==
=== The waka Te Raukura ===
In 1989, to mark the 150th anniversary of the European settlement of Wellington, the Wellington City Council commissioned the construction of a waka, to be named Te Raukura, and contributed $100,000 towards its construction. The name Te Raukura represents a white feather, and is the symbol of Parihaka leader Te Whiti o Rongomai. The waka was carved by Rangi Hetet and helpers at Waiwhetū in Lower Hutt. Te Raukura was launched in December 1989, along with its sister vessel Te Aniwaniwa, as part of celebrations of the 150th anniversary of signing of the Treaty of Waitangi, but remained in the custody of Waiwhetū Māori. In 1991, there was a dispute with Wellington City Council over possession of the waka. By 1994, Te Raukura was stored at the Wellington City Council offices. However, the council had funding concerns because of the costs involved in transporting the waka from its storage location to the sea. Each time the waka was to be used, it had to be moved on a trolley through the foyer of the council offices in Civic Square and then transported by truck. This had to be arranged some days in advance of any ceremonial use so that paddlers could practise. The costs of security for protecting the waka during the period away from the council offices added to the funding concerns.

By 1997, the waka was back at Waiwhetū for repairs, and local Māori insisted that better housing for the waka was needed before it would be released back to Wellington City Council. In 2006, the waka was in damaged condition and was again returned to Waiwhetū Māori for repairs. Wellington City Council paid $80,000 for replacing the totara hull of Te Raukura with kauri. The council was also paying rent for the storage of the waka at a recently constructed cultural centre close to Waiwhetū Marae.

The official opening of the new wharewaka building at Whairepo lagoon was scheduled for Waitangi Day on 6 February 2011. The plans for the wharewaka had included permanently displaying Te Raukura. However, by 28 January 2011, Te Raukura was still at Waiwhetū. The Waiwhetū rūnanga did not release Te Raukura for the official Waitangi Day opening of the wharewaka, and Hinemoana, a waka tetekura from Whakatāne was arranged as a short-term replacement. Despite the absence of the waka that had been intended for display in the building, the wharewaka was given the name Te Raukura Te Wharewaka o Pōneke.

The Dominion Post of 19 February 2011 described a "cultural divide" where the Wellington City Council insisted on its legal rights of ownership, but the Waiwhetū Māori perspective was that:

The waka Te Raukura is a taonga (treasure) that belongs to the "people of the harbour". It is considered a unifying force of two cities, which belongs on the water for the enjoyment of all harbour dwellers – not cooped up as a museum piece, gathering cobwebs under private ownership. Furthermore, Māori, as guardians, have cared for the waka during its creation, and since council officials failed in their "duty of care" – returning the badly damaged canoe to Waiwhetū Māori in 2006 to undergo a $80,000 repair job. The rūnanga arranged for the waka to be carved, painstakingly repaired its cracked hull, and housed it in a newly built cultural centre across the road from Waiwhetū Marae – where it remains. Local Māori have a strong attachment. Their leaders are unwilling to hand the canoe back to the council without assurances that it will not sustain the same damage.

In late February, Welllington City Council filed papers in the High Court seeking a hearing where they would ask the court to order the return of the waka. A judicial settlement conference was held in early April, and later in the month the council agreed to relinquish all rights to Te Raukura in exchange for receiving $150,000 from Waiwhetū Māori within 28 days. The council refused an alternative proposal of shared guardianship of the waka, and Waiwhetū Māori paid the $150,000 at a meeting with the mayor of Wellington, Celia Wade-Brown, on 23 May 2011. The council committed to using the funds received to procure a new waka.

=== New waka for Wellington ===
Two new waka in traditional materials were procured for Te Whanganui a Tara (Wellington) in mid-2011. The waka taua Te Rerenga Kōtare and the waka tētē Te Hononga were built in Northland under the guidance of master carver Hector Busby and are made out of swamp kauri. The waka taua was purchased by Wellington City Council and Te Wharewaka o Poneke Charitable Trust using funds from the settlement with Waiwhetū Māori for Te Raukura. The waka tētē was funded with a $100,000 grant from the Wellington Community Trust. A further waka Poutu with a fibreglass hull, was subsequently procured to be used more regularly for waka tours, alongside Te Hononga. Te Rerenga Kōtare is reserved for ceremonial occasions such as Waitangi Day, Anzac Day and Matariki.

==== Te Rerenga Kōtare ====
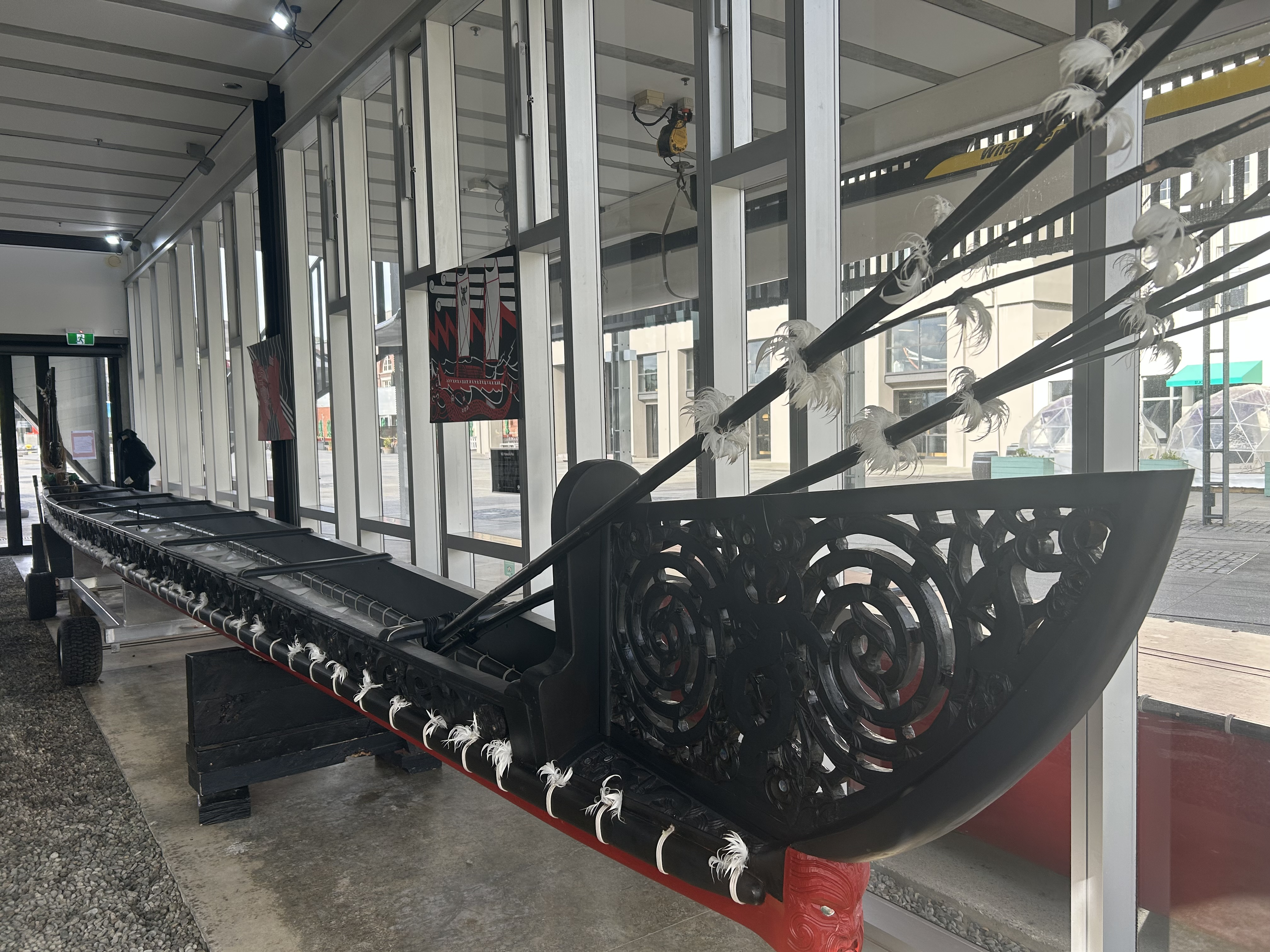
The waka taua Te Rerenga Kōtare in the wharewaka

Waka taua are the largest and most highly decorated of the single-hull carved waka used by Māori for ceremonial engagements and historically as war canoes. The waka taua has an elaborate carved prow called the tau ihu with a large variety of designs such as this highly stylised prow from Taranaki. The hull of the waka has been formed from a single log with the size of the waka determined by the size of the log. When the waka is used in ceremonial occasions it has two poles protruding from the prow covered with feathers called ihiihi. It has two large 'eyes' or karu atua through which the way ahead is viewed. A waka taua symbolises prestige, strength and self-determination. The name, Te Rerenga Kōtare (flight of the kingfisher), refers to the native sacred kingfisher, whose flight is strong, balanced and focused.

The waka carries a crew of male kaihoe (paddlers) of around 18–20 and is used around Te Whanganui a Tara/Wellington Harbour and at times in other places for waka regatta. For ceremonial occasions the kaihoe on the waka will wear traditional pake or raincapes, which tie around the shoulders of the paddlers.

==== Te Hononga ====
Te Hononga and Poutu are waka tētēkura, or canoes that embody the hopes, dreams and aspirations of the ancestors. Waka tētēkura are multipurpose canoes that were used for fishing and transport. Te Hononga is less elaborately carved than Te Rerenga Kōtare. The name Te Hononga, means to form alliances and bind together. Both men and women are welcome on these waka. Te Hononga has a distinctive prow known as a tētē that typically takes the form of a stylised face with a protruding tongue, described as tētē, or pakoko. The maiden voyage of Te Hononga on Wellington harbour was on 13 August 2011.

==== Poutu ====
Poutu was launched on Waitangi Day 2014 and built in remembrance of kaumātua Sam (Poutu Wipa) Jackson.The hull is fibreglass and has carved tauihu (prow) and taurapa (stern-post). Poutu is constructed of fibreglass for strength, durability, lightness and for the comfort of the users. This waka has buoyancy compartments through the centre of the waka and at each end that keep it afloat even if filled with water.

== Cultural and educational activities ==
The Wharewaka o Pōneke Charitable Trust provides cultural and educational activities based from the building. These include walking tours that show the history of Wellington from the earliest explorers to the present day, waka tours, and presentations for primary and secondary school groups. The trust reported that in the 2025 year it had delivered 2,541 walking tours, and 1,084 waka tours. In 2025, the travel magazine Lonely Planet rated the waka tours in the list of top 10 things to do in Wellington.

== See also ==
- Wharves in Wellington Harbour
