= Kill or Be Killed =

Kill or Be Killed may refer to:

== Film and TV ==
- Kill or Be Killed (1942 film), British documentary short film
- Kill or Be Killed (1950 film), American film
- Kill or Be Killed (1966 film), Italian Spaghetti Western
- Kill or Be Killed (1976 film), South African martial arts film
- Kill or Be Killed (2015 film), American Western film
- "Kill or Be Killed" (The Vampire Diaries), 2010 episode of The Vampire Diaries
- "Kill or Be KIlled", an episode of Monsters: The Lyle and Erik Menendez Story

== Music ==
- Kill or Be Killed (Biohazard album), 2003
- Kill or Be Killed (Deniro Farrar and Shady Blaze album), 2012
- "Kill or Be Killed" (song), song by Muse from their 2022 album Will of the People
- "Kill or Be Killed", a song by Jay Rock from his 2011 album Follow Me Home

== Other ==
- Kill or Be Killed (comics), ongoing American comic book series that began in 2016
- "KILL or BE KILLED", motto of Flowey, the main antagonist of the video game Undertale
