= Whairepo Lagoon =

Lagoon in Wellington

Coordinates: 41.288652°S 174.779037°E

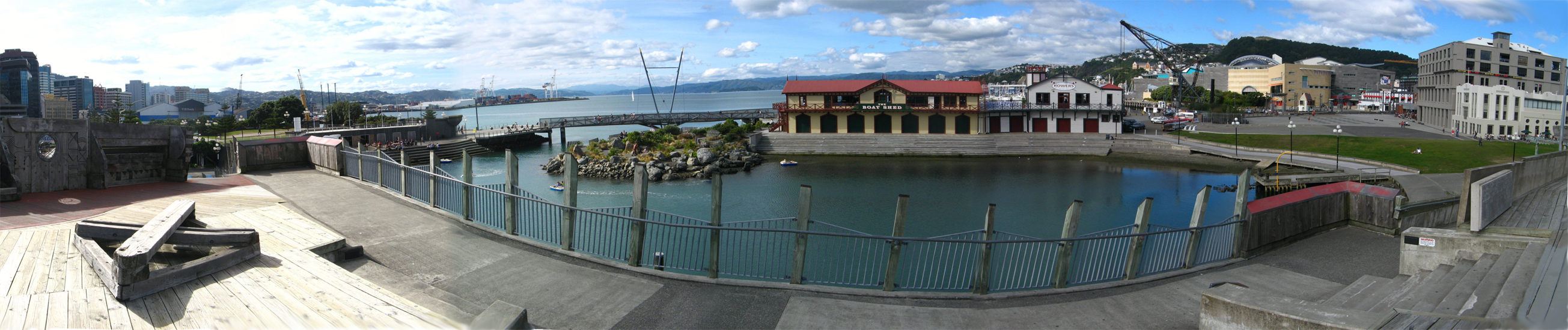
Whairepo Lagoon, from the City-to-Sea bridge, circled by Frank Kitts Park, The Boatshed, Museum of New Zealand Te Papa Tongarewa, and the New Zealand Exchange before the construction of Te Wharewaka o Pōneke.

Whairepo Lagoon is an open public area on the waterfront of Wellington, New Zealand. It is a small man-made sea water lagoon connected to Wellington Harbour through a narrow channel.

Land between Queens Wharf and Taranaki Street Wharf on the Wellington waterfront was reclaimed from 1969, allowing creation of Frank Kitts Park and Whairepo Lagoon and closing in the landward side of Taranaki Street Wharf. In 1989, two historic rowing club buildings, the Star Boating Club and Wellington Rowing Club, were moved to the reclaimed area adjacent to Whairepo Lagoon. Te Wharewaka o Pōneke was built on reclaimed land immediately to the south of the two rowing club buildings and was officially opened at a dawn ceremony on Waitangi Day, 6 February 2011.

A split-level footbridge over the mouth of the lagoon was designed by Eastbridge. The lagoon is surrounded by the City-to-Sea bridge, the Wellington Rowing, Star Boating Club, and Te Wharewaka o Pōneke buildings. Tanya Ashken's Albatross fountain sits on the north side of the lagoon between it and Frank Kitts Park.

On 17 December 2015 the lagoon was officially named Whairepo Lagoon, as it previously had no official name. The lagoon was previously referred to as Frank Kitts Lagoon, Frank Kitts Park Lagoon or simply The Lagoon. 'Whairepo' is the Māori name for the Eagle ray which can sometimes be seen in the lagoon.

From December 2023 to April 2024 a statue of Marvel's Mjölnir, the hammer of Thor, was placed next to the lagoon for a Marvel exhibition.

On 4 April 2026, a long distance open water swimmer, Jono Ridler, completed an approximately 1,400 km (870 mi) swim when he came ashore at Whairepo Lagoon. The swim had begun at North Cape on 5 January 2026, and set a new world record for an unassisted multistage ultramarathon swim. The swim and associated community visits along the way was to raise awareness of the environmental damage caused by bottom trawling.

== Gallery ==
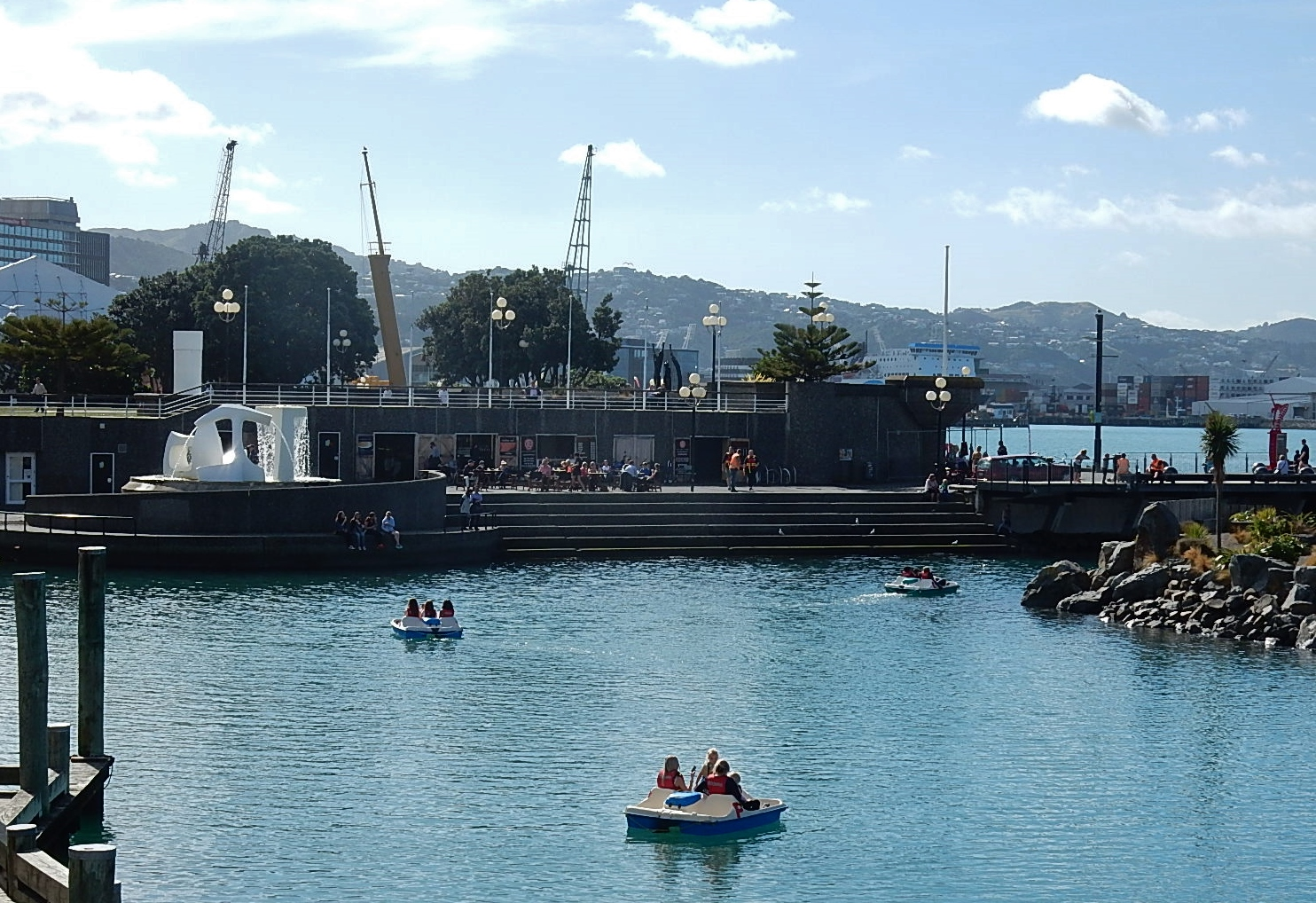
Pedal boats on the lagoon

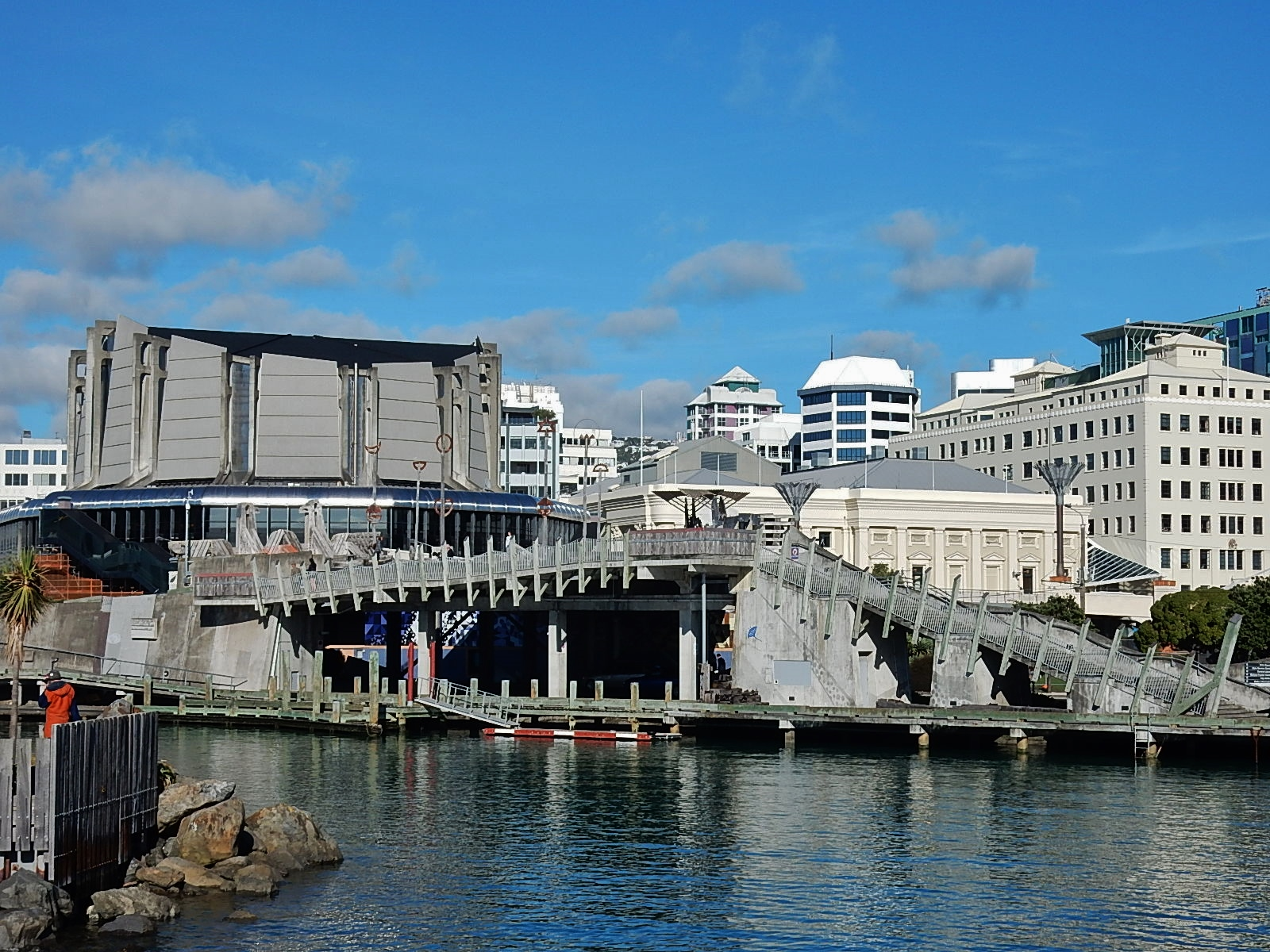
City to Sea Bridge

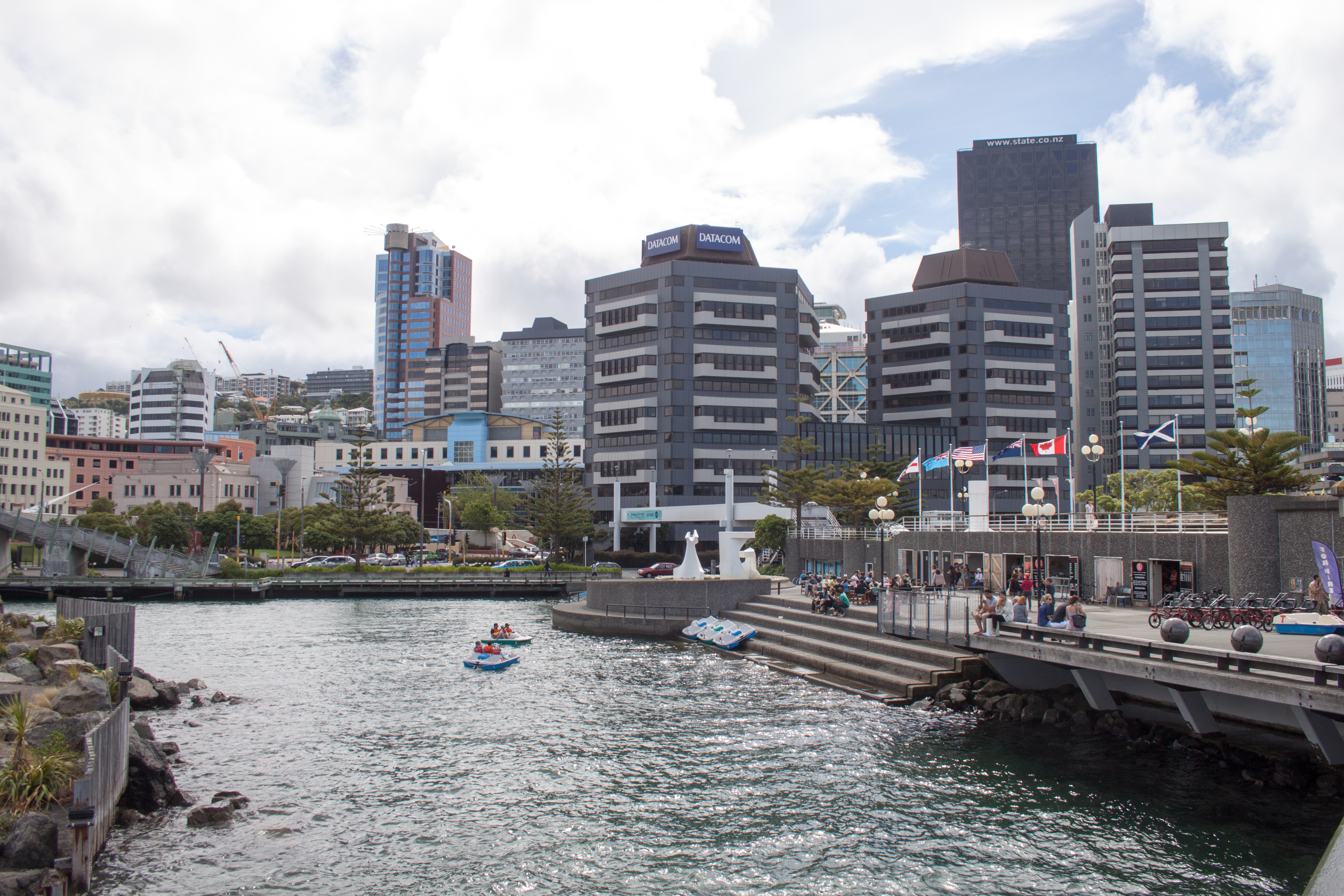
A view of Wellington's civic and commercial centre from the seaward side of the lagoon

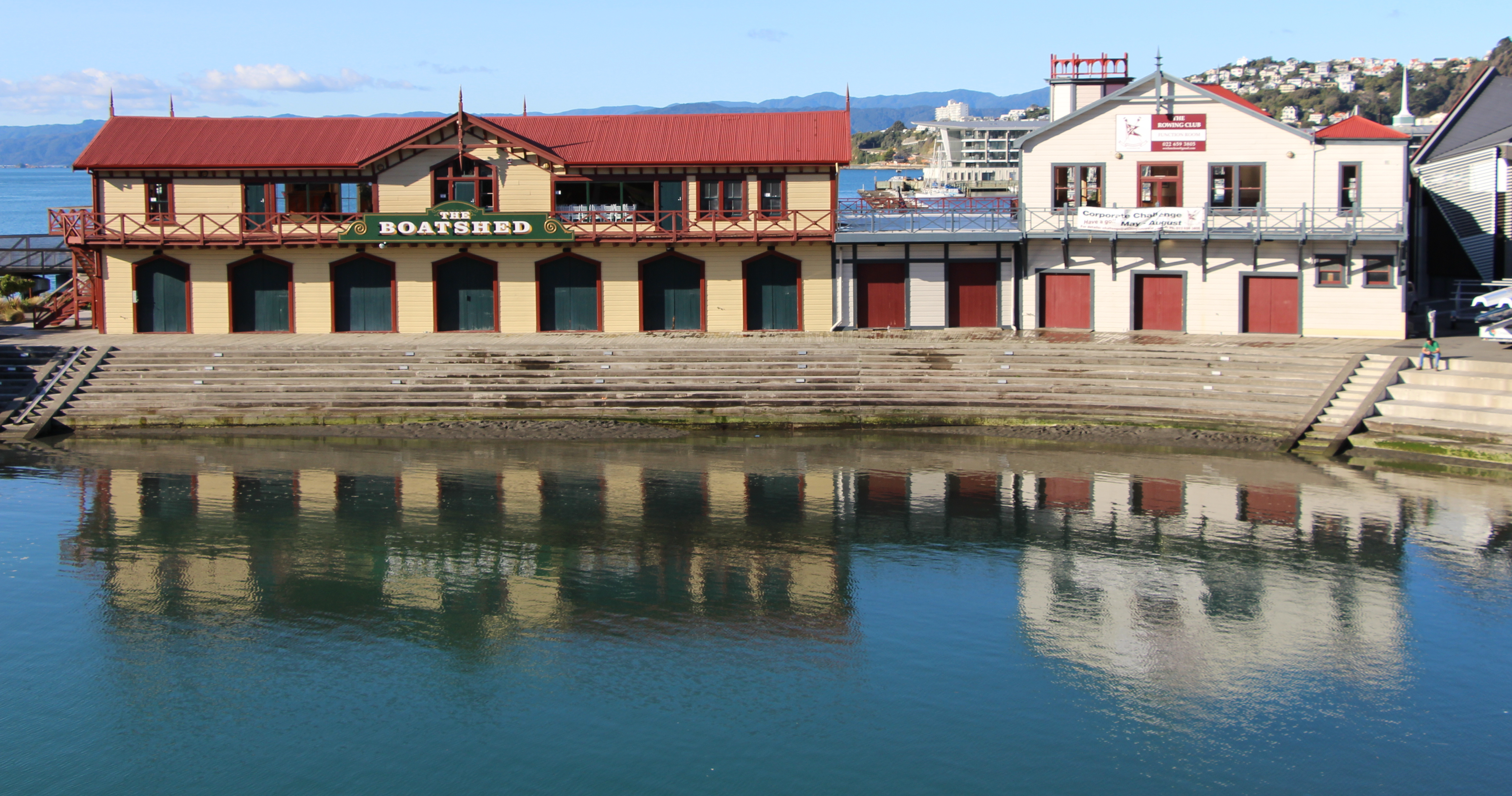
The Star Boating Club and Wellington Rowing Club buildings

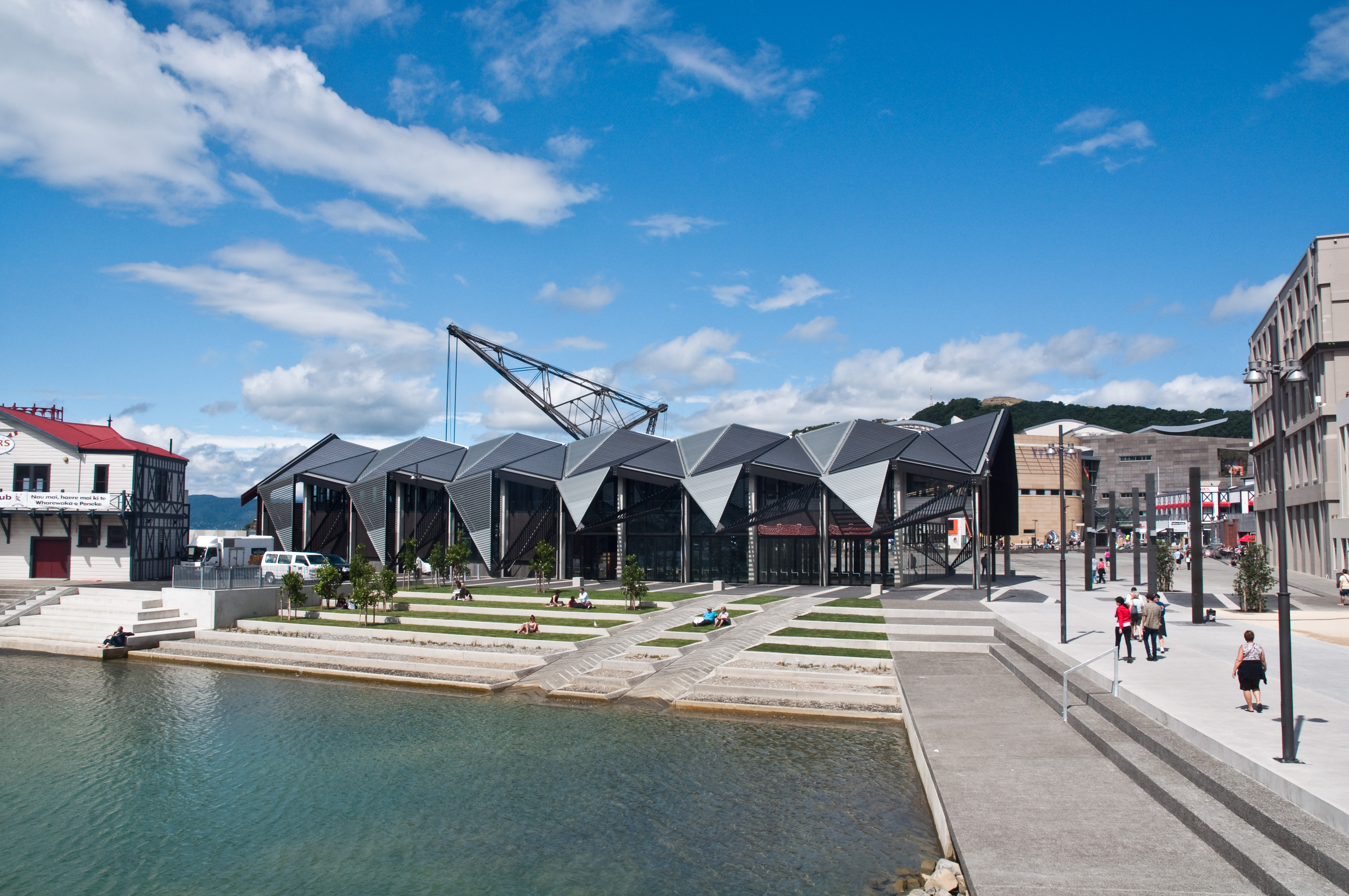
Te Wharewaka o Pōneke
