= Bix Lye =

British-American artist

Bix Lye (February 19, 1937 – January 10, 2023) was a British-American artist specializing in sculpture and printmaking.

== Life ==
Born in London to New Zealand-born artist and filmmaker Len Lye and South African dance teacher Jane Lye (nee Florence Winnifred Thompson), he was named after the jazz musician Bix Beiderbecke.

== Career ==
During the Second World War, Bix and Jane Lye (and accompanied by Yancy Lye, born in 1940) were frequently separated from Len Lye while the latter worked on film commissions from Britain's Ministry of Information and the Realist Film Unit. During the London Blitz, Jane and Bix Lye departed London for the rural safety of living with friends such as Naomi Mitchison in Scotland, Sidney Bernstein in Kent and Ruthven Todd in Essex. Todd in particular become a close friend and surrogate father to Bix.

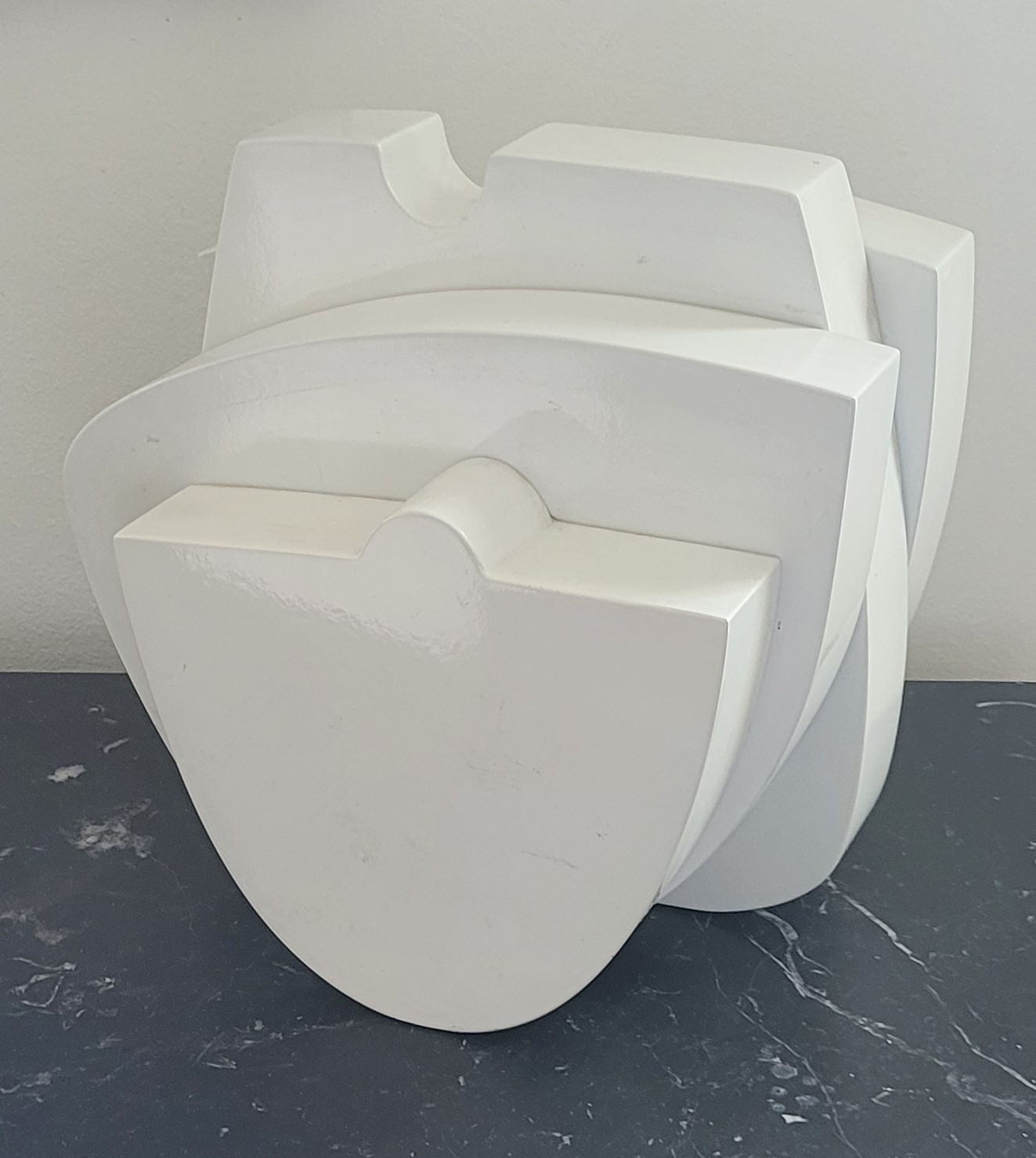
Untitled sculpture by Bix Lye, documented in Newburg, NY. 2023

Len Lye's absence culminated in his relocation to New York in 1943 to work for Time Inc. The family followed in 1945, joining Len Lye at his apartment at 791 Lexington Avenue by which point Len Lye had established a new relationship with Ann Zeiss (recently separated from British journalist Wilfred "Tommy" Hindle), a situation that created an often strained relationship between father and son.

Bix Lye studied at the Boston University and the Rhode Island School of Design, majoring in sculpture. Following his studies, he shared studio space with his father at 801 Greenwich Street and supported his artistic career through work as a specialized carpenter.

Lye's signature style involved small, table-top sized sculptures in a mid-century modern aesthetic meticulously fashioned in discrete sections from contemporary industrial materials such as Epoxy, Masonite, and Lucite. His diminutive minimalist sculpture found immediate attention in New York during the 1960s, featuring in both the 1964 and the 1968 editions of the Whitney Museum of American Art's Annual Exhibition of Contemporary American Sculpture.

In later years, Lye returned to more frequent exhibiting and was a frequent exhibitor with Holland Tunnel Gallery, including notable collaborative exhibitions with Jan Mulder (Double Feature, 2006) and the abstract expressionist painter Thornton Willis (Matter of Fact, 2022).

Lye was a long-term resident of Brooklyn before relocating to Newburgh where he died in 2023.
