= Footprints Studio =

Former textile printing workshop in London

Footprints Studio was a textile printing workshop in the manner of the Arts and Crafts movement established by Celandine Kennington in 1925 at Durham Wharf in London's Hammersmith. Typical products were hand block printed fabric, curtains, coats and shawls. The name ‘Footprints’ is said to have been on account of the foot pressure workers applied to the blocks to print onto fabric. Footprints was known for its preference of aniline dyes over vegetable dyes and lino blocks over wood.

The workshop was supervised by Gwen Pike and goods were sold through the shop ‘Modern Textiles' owned by Elspeth Little. Following the death of Gwen Pike and retirement of Celandine Kennington, Joyce Clissold (1903-1982) took over management of the workshop with Germaine Tallents.

In 1933 workshop moved to larger premises in Brentford and a new outlet opened New Bond Street followed by another in Knightsbridge two years later. By this stage the workshop employed up to 50 people, typically working class women.

The business declined with World War Two but remained active until Clissold's death in 1982.

== Artists and designers ==
Notable artists and designers associated with Footprints include.

- Phyllis Barron
- Joyce Clissold
- Marion Dorn
- Erik Kennington
- Elspeth Little
- Len Lye
- Enid Marx
- Paul Nash
- Gwen Pike
- Doris Scull
- Margaret Stansfield
- Germaine Tallents
- Norman Wilkinson

== Collections ==
Footprints studio work is held in museum collections in the UK.

- Works in the collection of the Victoria and Albert Museum
- Works in the Central Saint Martins Museum and Study Collection
