= Frank Kitts Park =

Public park in Wellington, New Zealand

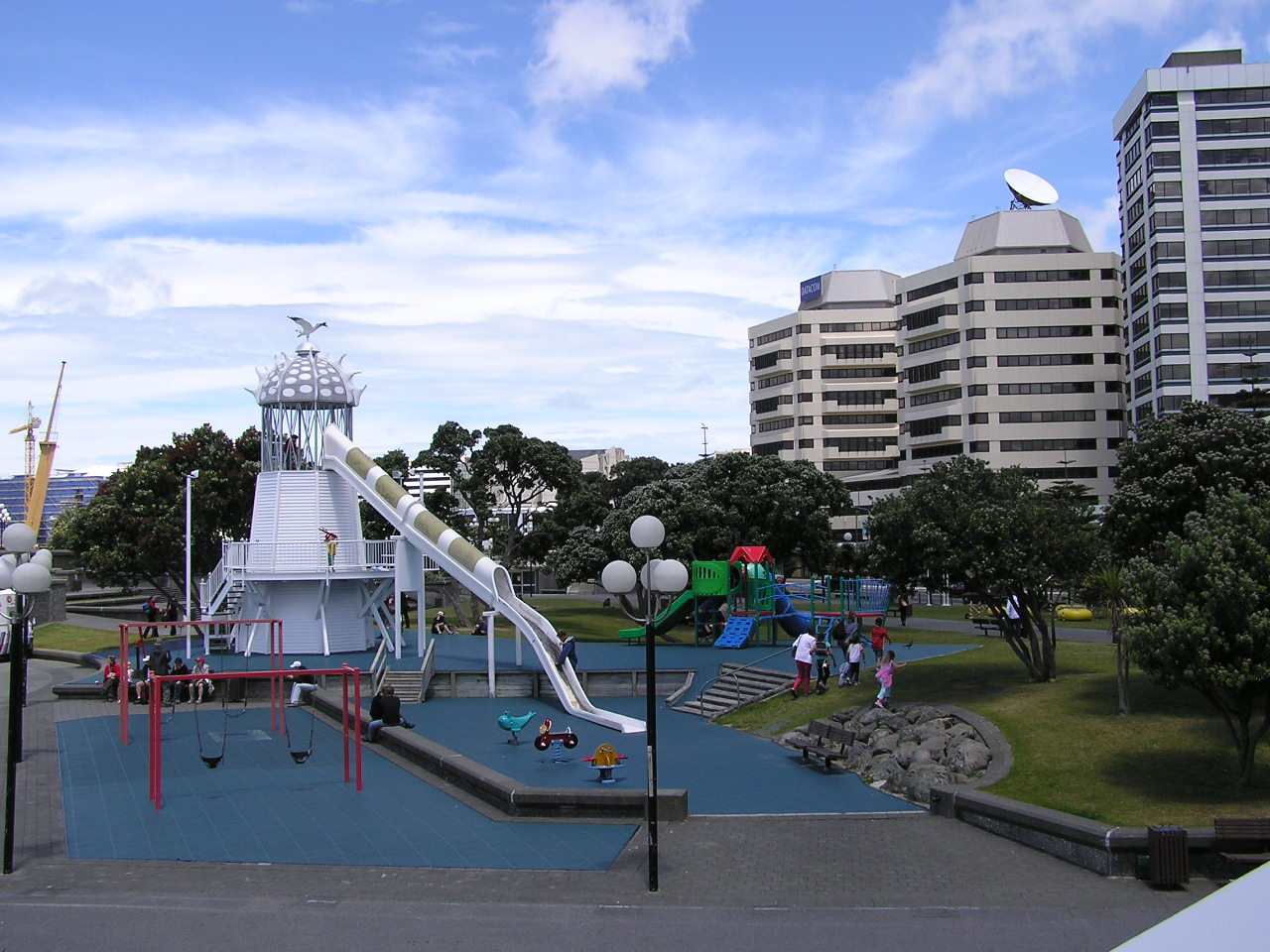
- Playground at Frank Kitts Park (2004)
- Interactive map of Frank Kitts Park
- Type: Public park
- Location: Wellington, New Zealand
- Area: 2 hectares (4.9 acres)
- Created: 1976; 50 years ago
- Operator: Wellington City Council
- Status: Open year round

Frank Kitts Park is a public park situated between Jervois Quay and the Lambton Harbour waterfront in Wellington, New Zealand. It is named after Sir Frank Kitts, New Zealand politician and mayor of Wellington.

== Background ==
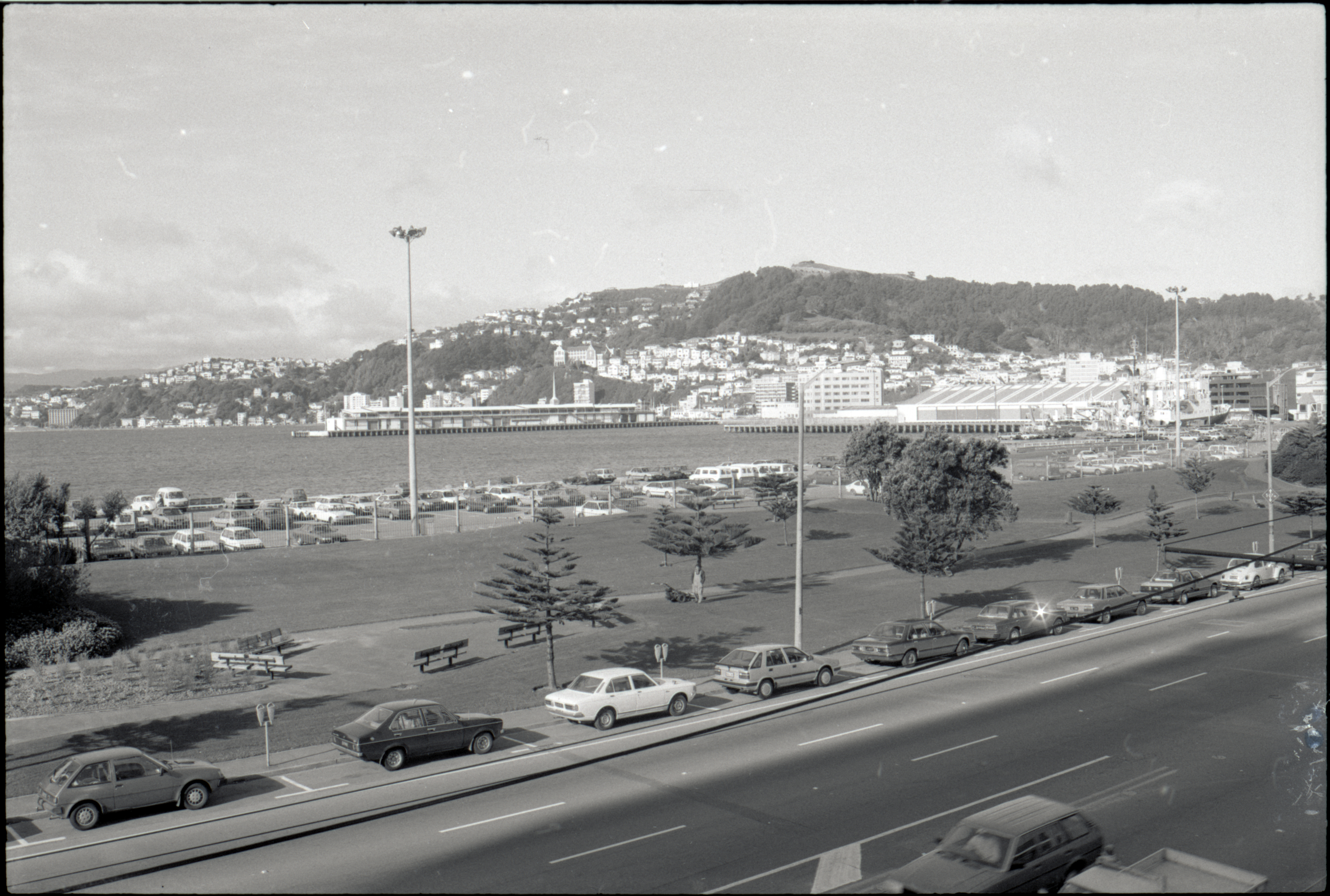
Frank Kitts Park in 1987, before redevelopment. Jervois Quay in foreground.

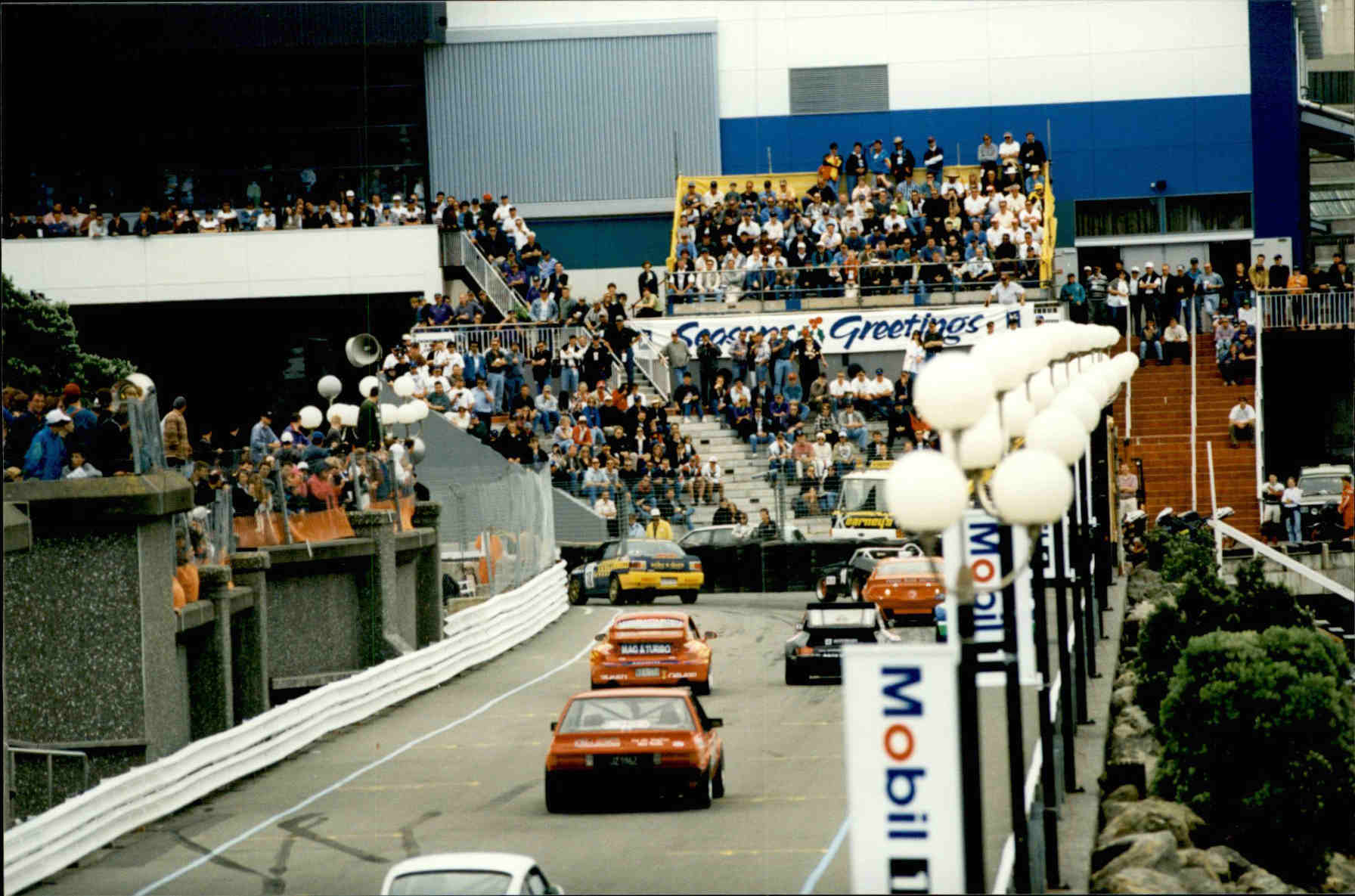
Mobil Street Race along the promenade at the park, 1996. TSB Arena in background.

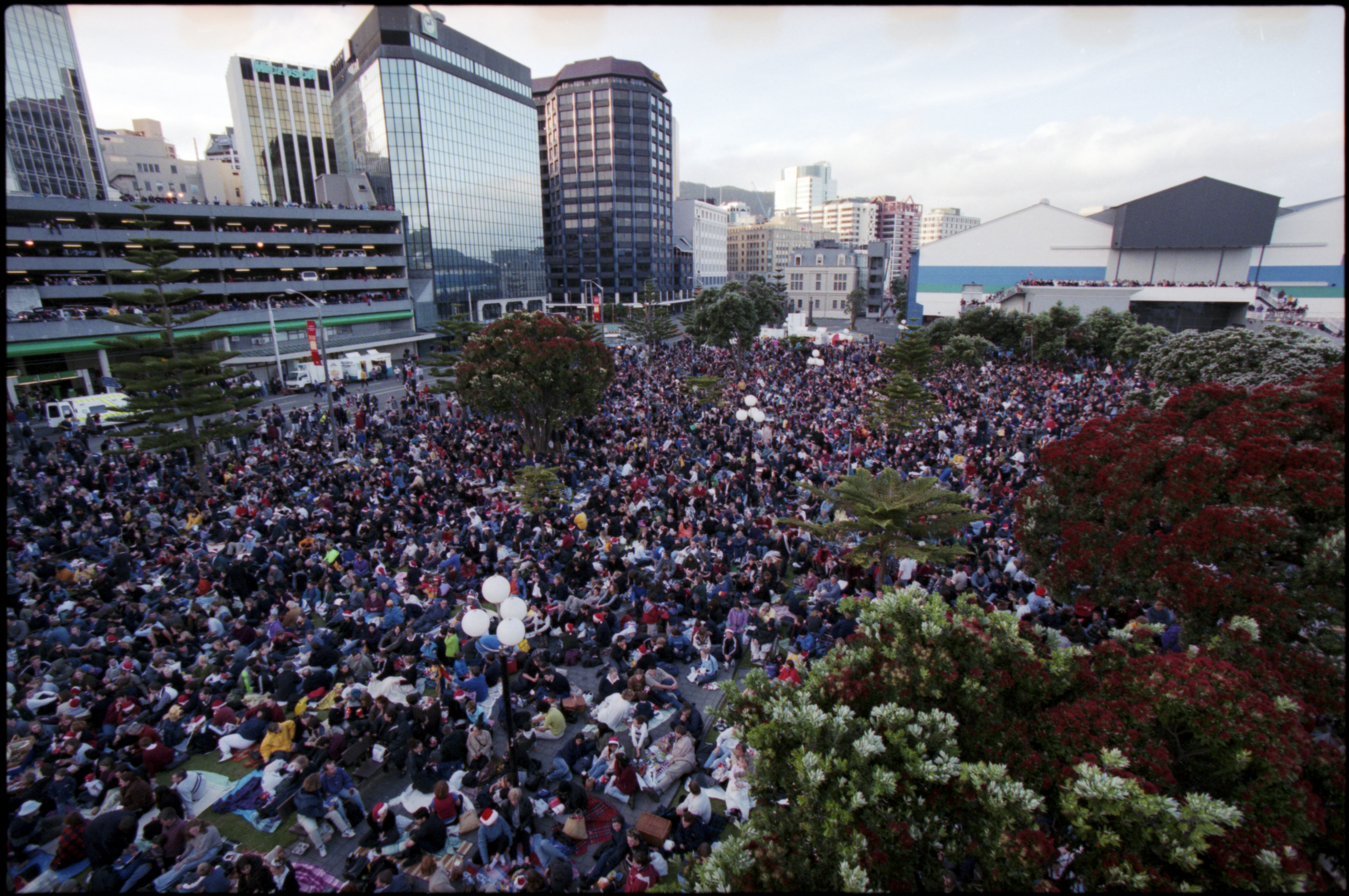
'Carols by Candlelight' event at the park in 1999.

The park was formed in 1976 on reclaimed land and an area alongside Jervois Quay formerly used for wharf sheds, and was originally known as Marine Park. In 1978 a pedestrian bridge was built over Jervois Quay linking the park to the city. Wellington City Council renamed the park Frank Kitts Park in May 1979, in memory of Sir Frank Kitts who had died two months earlier. Kitts was mayor of Wellington from 1956 to 1974 and a member of the Harbour Board at the time of his death, and the Council wished to acknowledge his long association with the city and harbour.

The park was redeveloped by Lambton Harbour Management, a Council-owned organisation charged with waterfront management and development, and reopened in 1990. Horizon Paving Company won an award for Best Public Project in the 1992 New Zealand Landscape Guild Awards for its work on Frank Kitts Park. The company was praised for its craftsmanship, precision and attention to detail in the complex project of paving the park.

The south end of the redeveloped park consists of a covered public carpark for 99 cars with the roof of the carpark forming a large area of lawn. The carpark, which also hosted an 'underground' market in the weekends, was closed in 2020 due to earthquake risk, but reopened in December 2024 with 97 carparks after the Council reassessed the risk. The north end of the park has a lawn and popular children's play area which features a lighthouse-shaped slide. The slide was closed in 2021 after three incidences of pre-schoolers breaking their legs. In the central area of the park is a small amphitheatre which has been used for many public events including Carols by Candlelight, festivals and concerts, and which is a popular lunch spot for city workers. The seaward side of the park consists of a broad promenade partially bordered by a high wall between the promenade and amphitheatre. The wall was included in the 1990 redevelopment as a safety barrier for people watching the Wellington 500 car races and includes spaces underneath for small retail outlets.

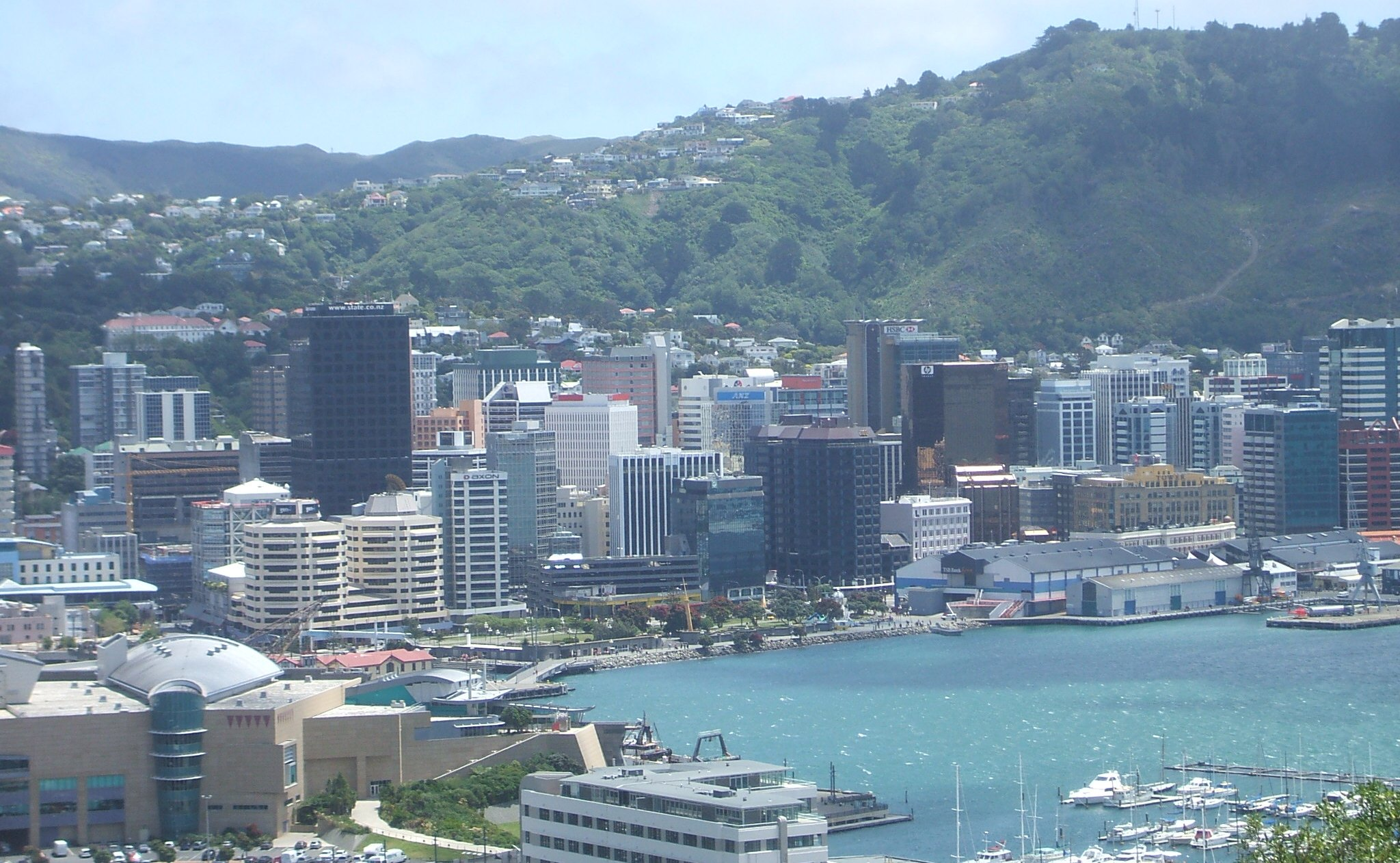
View of Wellington from Mt Victoria, with Frank Kitts Park in the centre.

== Points of interest ==
Tanya Ashken's Albatross fountain sits at the south end of Frank Kitts Park next to Whairepo Lagoon. It was commissioned by the Wellington Sculpture Trust and installed in 1986.

One of the masts from the ship Wahine forms a memorial near the amphitheatre at the park. A plaque placed there on behalf of survivors of the Wahine disaster reads in part:

"Hundreds survived due to the efforts of a large rescue mission. This plaque is dedicated to all those who assisted in that rescue. You saved us from disaster and took us to a safe place."

If development of the park goes ahead, the mast will be retained but moved to a new location within the park.

Water Whirler is a kinetic sculpture by Len Lye that was installed on the waterfront near the children's play area, adjacent to the promenade, in 2006. It oscillates and sprays water from many jets. In 2018 the sculpture was badly damaged by a man trying to swing from it, and in April 2023 another vandal damaged it again. The repaired sculpture was reinstalled in October 2024.

Fruits of the Garden is a bronze sculpture by Paul Dibble. It was exhibited at Frank Kitts Park during the 2002 New Zealand Festival, then bought by Lambton Harbour Management and permanently installed at the park.

Near Fruits of the Garden is a sundial by Charles Stone. It was commissioned by the Lambton Harbour Development Project in 1990 and commemorates Mayor Frank Kitts and the opening of the redeveloped park.

Numerous plaques have been installed on the wall along the promenade. These commemorate various events, organisations and people, including for example the ship Pamir and its crew, Polish refugee children of Pahiatua, US Marines, and New Zealand forces who served in the Korean War.

== Future plans ==
The Waterfront Leadership Group was a council-appointed group of citizens who came together in 2000 to consider the future of Wellington's waterfront. They held meetings, considered submissions, presentations and reports and commissioned market research to understand the needs and concerns of Wellingtonians. Their work resulted in The Wellington Waterfront Framework, published in 2001 by Wellington City Council, which laid out a vision, themes and policy for the future of the waterfront. The themes identified were historical and contemporary culture, city to water connections, promenade, open space and diversity. About Frank Kitts Park specifically, the report stated that the park was a large green park and centre for outdoor activities on and off the water. The report suggested that the Jervois Quay edge of the park could be made safer and access to the water improved, and concluded: "While no major work is proposed for the main part of the park, it is recognised as major green open space. It provides visual relief from the predominantly hard surfaces of the adjacent central city". In spite of this document acknowledging the value of open and public space, there have been multiple proposals from Wellington City Council to enclose or build on the open space at Frank Kitts Park. Cost and controversy over the proposed Chinese Garden have stalled redevelopment plans. By June 2020 the proposed cost of redevelopment was $30 million, and by February 2021 the forecasted cost was more than $40 million. In October 2024 Wellington City Council announced it was going ahead with plans to redevelop the park, with a budget of $42 million.

=== Chinese Garden ===
In 2001 when the Wellington Waterfront Framework was published, it mentioned a proposal for a traditional walled Chinese garden to be constructed near Te Papa. However, in 2016 a controversial proposal was announced to use part of Frank Kitts Park for the garden. Many Wellingtonians were upset at this announcement and over 3000 signed an online petition to keep the park in its current form. Objections often focused on the fact that a walled garden locked at night would remove access for many people and reduce open space in the heart of the city. The Environment Court gave resource consent for the Chinese Garden in 2016, but lobby group Waterfront Watch appealed the decision. As of October 2024 construction had not begun.

=== Fale Malae ===
In September 2021 Wellington City Council approved construction of a fale malae, a Pacific-focused venue for hosting corporate and cultural events, meetings and gatherings, at Frank Kitts Park. This would entail demolition of the closed carpark and loss of open space on the waterfront. Design concepts for the fale were released in April 2022, showing that the carpark and the footbridge over Jervois Quay would be removed.

=== Playground redevelopment ===
Plans for redeveloping the park and playground go back to 2006. The playground at Frank Kitts Park was built around 1989 and featured a slide shaped like a lighthouse. In September 2021 Wellington City Council voted to remove the slide after reports of very young children injuring themselves using it in spite of notices advising of the recommended minimum age for users. In January 2022 the whole playground was demolished and a $6 million redevelopment began, but construction stopped in May 2022 when the builders, Armstrong Downes Commercial, went into liquidation. In December 2022 the Council announced that the cost of the playground redevelopment would increase to about $9 million and the playground might reopen by summer 2023. The playground was redesigned to fit a smaller budget and reopened in February 2024.

== Gallery ==
Frank Kitts Park

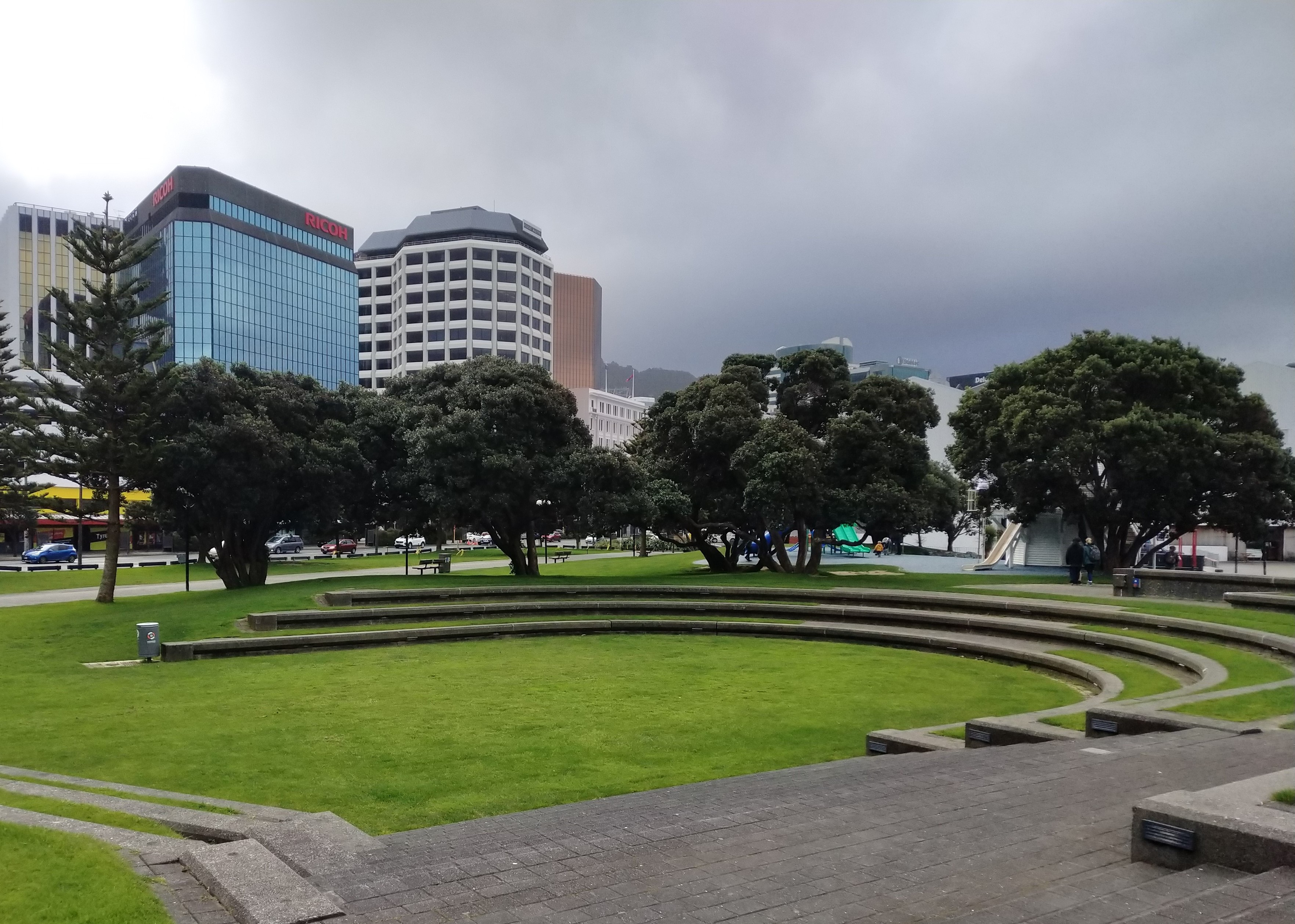
Amphitheatre

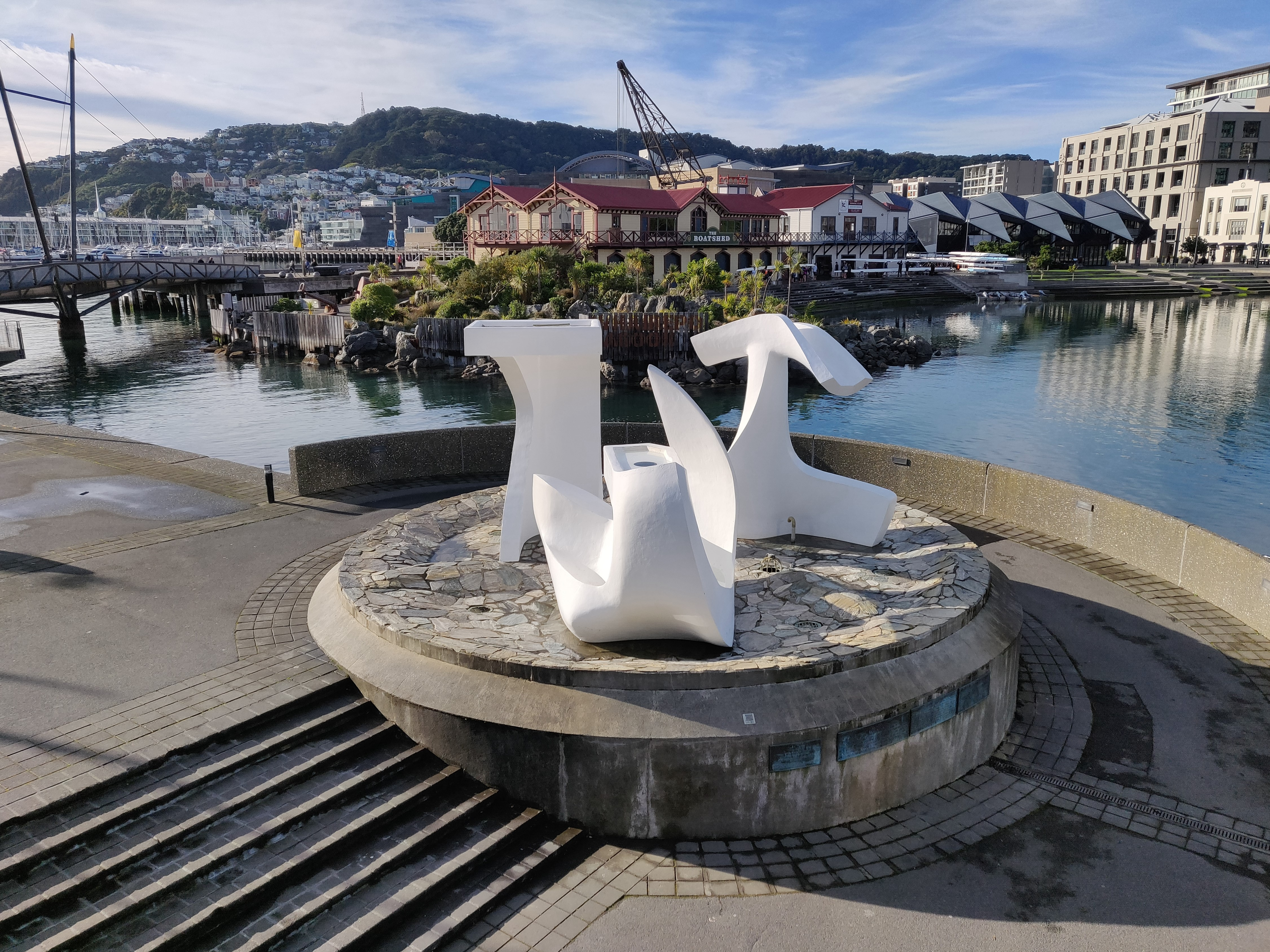
Albatross by Tanya Ashken

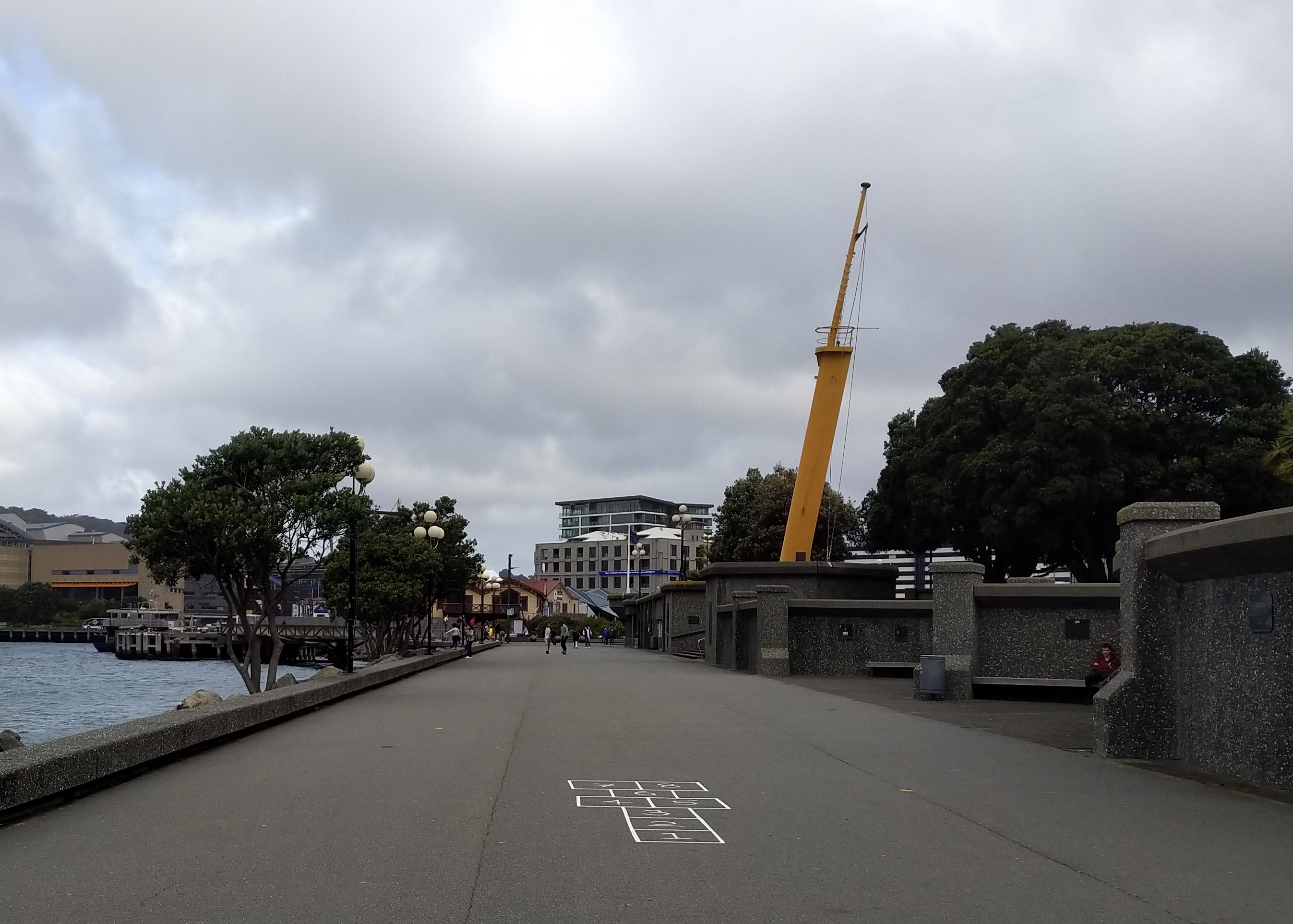
Promenade, with Wahine mast

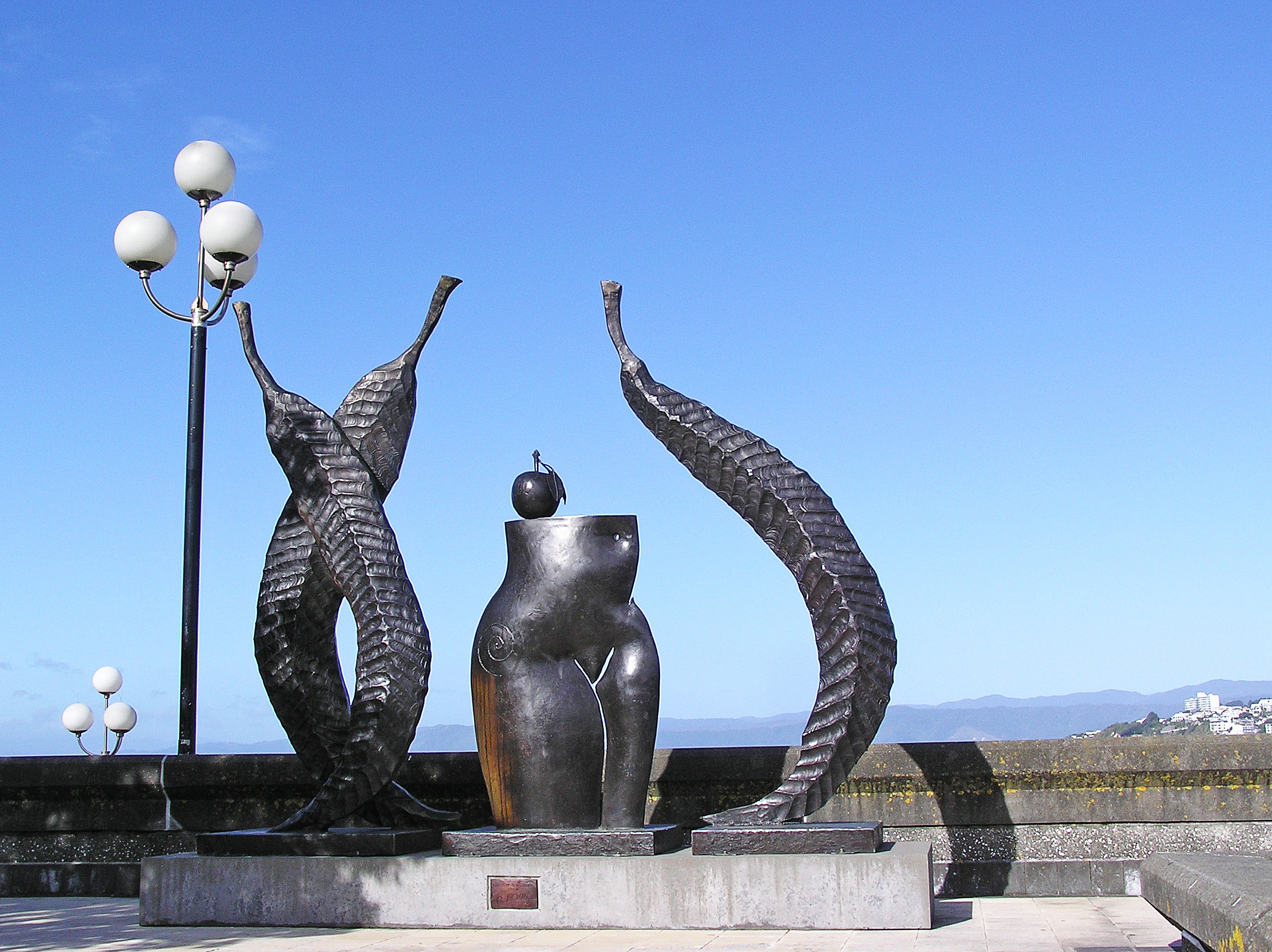
Fruits of the Garden by Paul Dibble

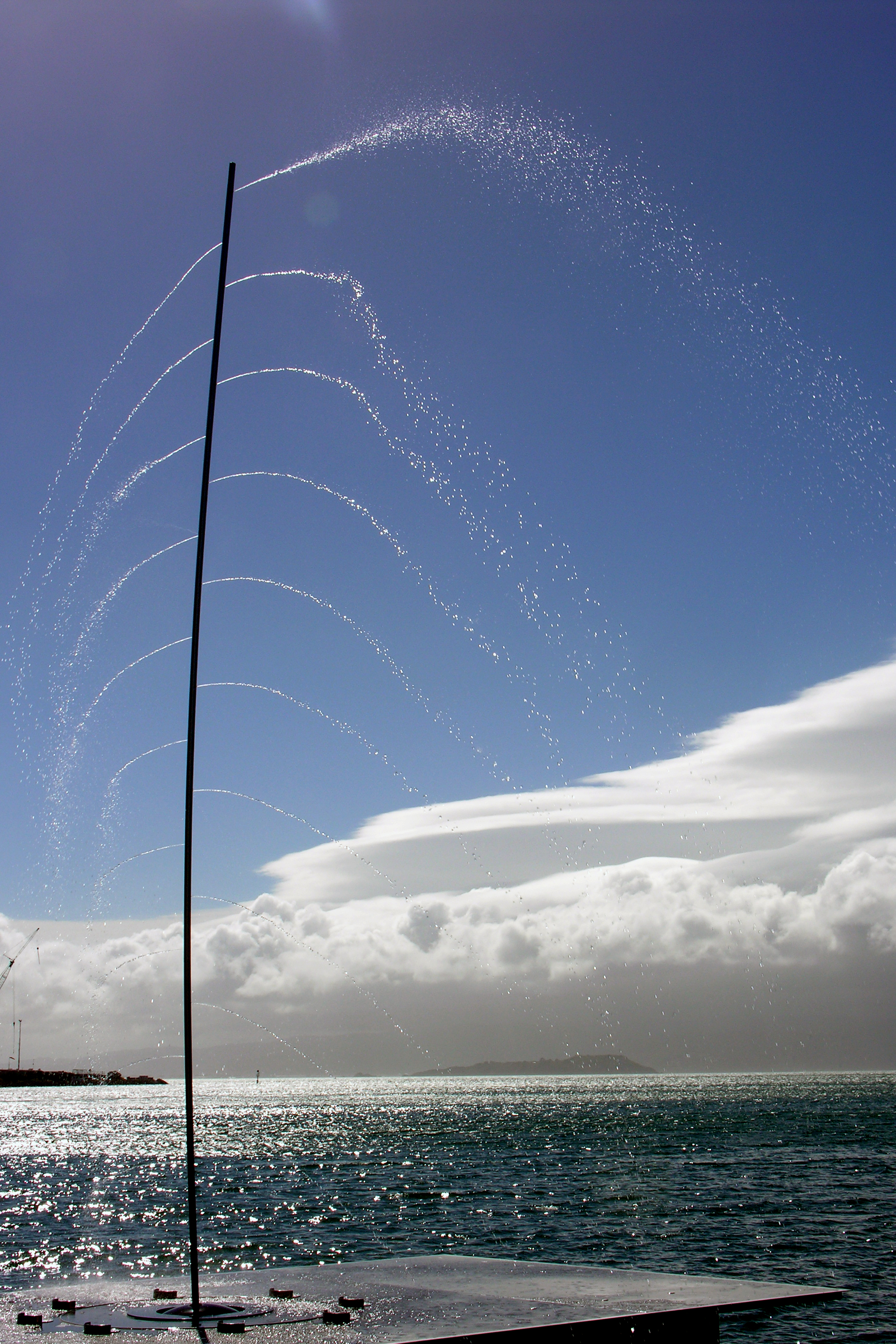
Water Whirler kinetic sculpture
