= Free Radicals (1979 film) =

- Directed by: Len Lye
- Music by: Baguirmi tribe of Africa
- Release date: 1979
- Running time: 4 minutes
- Country: United States

Free Radicals is a black-and-white animated film short by avant-garde filmmaker Len Lye. Begun in 1958 and revised in 1979, Lye made the film by directly scratching the film stock. The resulting "figures of motion" are set to music by the Baguirmi tribe of Africa.

== Production ==
In Experimental Animation: the origins of a new art, Lye recalled making Free Radicals:

"I made Free Radicals from 16mm black film leader, which you can get from DuPont. I took a graver, various kinds of needles. (My range included arrowheads for romanticism.) You stick down the sides with scotch tape and you get to work with scratching the stuff out. … … You hold your hand at the right height and act is if you were making your signature. It goes on forever. You can carry a pictographic design in your head and make a little design. You can't see what you're doing because your hand is in the way. That's why those things have that kind of spastic look."

== Release ==
Free Radicals screened in 1958 at the second Knokke-Le-Zoute Experimental Film Festival.

== Legacy ==
It was released on DVD as part of Rhythms, a collection of short films by Lye.

In 2008, the film was selected for preservation in the National Film Registry by the Library of Congress, being deemed "culturally, historically, or aesthetically significant".

== See also ==
- List of avant-garde films of the 1950s
- Independent animation
- 1979 in film
