= Kill or Be Killed (1942 film) =

- Directed by: Len Lye
- Starring: Marius Goring
- Production company: Ministry of Information
- Release date: 1942
- Running time: 18 minutes
- Country: United Kingdom
- Language: English

Kill or Be Killed is a 1942 British short documentary-style film directed by experimental New Zealand artist Len Lye for the Realist Film Unit during his time working for the British Government's Ministry of Information.

The initial purpose of the film was to serve as a military training tool and a piece of post-war propaganda viewable by the general public, but since its release, both critics and filmmakers alike have hailed it as a "masterpiece of filmmaking," claiming that the realistic cinematography is pleasing both in aesthetics and technicality for its time. The film is most notable for its use of subjective viewing.

== Cast ==
- Marius Goring as German sniper (voice)
- A British soldier as Sergeant Smith (voice)

== Plot ==
Kill or Be Killed follows the single event of British sniper, Sergeant Smith, as he crawls about an unidentified, yet generic-looking forest seeking to aim and kill a Nazi enemy ironically named Schmidt. It is actually within the first few minutes of the film that Smith acquires and executes his target, while the second act of the film (totaling in three) is a flashback that compresses the tedious manhunt leading up to the climax. The lengthy sequence shows Smith in gross camouflage blending naturally within his surrounding—each bodily movement abiding the dynamics of obscurity as he slowly ascends to higher ground and optimal surveillance. Once there, Smith progresses the action of the film by reiterating the scoping and sniping of Schmidt, and then uses the corpse as a decoy to lure other Nazi soldiers into a clearing where he systematically picks them off. The film ends with an elicited tone of triumph.

== Cinematography ==
Lye makes "inventive use" of camera close-ups and long, gradual sequences of movement to stimulate suspense that is shared by both the protagonist and the viewer. Much of the sound used throughout the film consists of isolated instances—like the snapping of twigs, footsteps on the forest floor, and the climactic gunshot. The brevity of such audiovisual cues serves to propel the drama but also maintain the principles of camouflage.

Another highly discussed element of Kill or Be Killed's artistry involves scenes in which Lye deploys the camera to portray a unique point of view. For example, toward the beginning of the film, a camera strapped to Smith's waist tracks the British soldier's movements as he pursues his enemy through the forest—a technique that would later be termed the "first-person shooter." In another scene, the camera cuts from an image of Smith lifting binoculars to his face, to a subjective view of the scene as he views it through the lenses.

== Reception ==
Thomas Pryor, a film critic for the New York Times said it was "an especially exciting and brilliantly executed piece of pure cinema".

Documentary News Letter reviewed the work and concluded the "Propaganda Value: Excellent."

== Accolades ==
It was on a list of twenty-one films announced as 1943 Academy Award nominees for Short Subject Documentary but the Documentary Award Committee subsequently narrowed the field to seven titles and Kill or Be Killed was not included on the final ballot.
