= Len Lye =

New Zealand artist (1901–1980)

- Lye in New York, 1966
- Born: Leonard Charles Huia Lye; 5 July 1901; Christchurch, New Zealand
- Died: 15 May 1980 (aged 78); Warwick, New York, U.S.
- Known for: Film, sculpture

Leonard Charles Huia Lye (/laɪ/; 5 July 1901 – 15 May 1980) was a New Zealand artist known primarily for his experimental films and kinetic sculpture. His films are held in archives including the New Zealand Film Archive, British Film Institute, Museum of Modern Art in New York City, and the Pacific Film Archive at University of California, Berkeley. Lye's sculptures are found in the collections of the Whitney Museum of American Art, the Art Institute of Chicago, the Albright-Knox Art Gallery and the Berkeley Art Museum. Although he became a naturalized citizen of the United States in 1950, much of his work went to New Zealand after his death, where it is housed at the Govett-Brewster Art Gallery in New Plymouth.

== Career ==
As a student, Lye became convinced that motion could be part of the language of art, leading him to early (and now lost) experiments with kinetic sculpture, as well as a desire to make film. Lye was also one of the first Pākehā artists to appreciate the art of Māori, Australian Aboriginal, Pacific Island and African cultures, and this had great influence on his work. In the early 1920s Lye travelled widely in the South Pacific. He spent extended periods in Australia and Samoa, where he was expelled by the New Zealand colonial administration for living within an indigenous community.

Tusalava, a 1929 animated film by Lye

Working his way as a coal trimmer aboard a steam ship, Lye moved to London in 1926. He quickly entered modernist circles, exhibiting with the Seven and Five Society from 1927 until 1934, and becoming affiliated with the Footprints Studio. Most notably, Lye exhibited in the 1936 International Surrealist Exhibition and began to make experimental films. Following his first animated film Tusalava, Lye began to make films in association with the British General Post Office, for the GPO Film Unit. He reinvented the technique of drawing directly on film, producing his animation for the 1935 film A Colour Box, an advertisement for "cheaper parcel post", without using a camera for anything except the title cards at the beginning of the film. It was the first direct film screened to a general audience. It was made by painting vibrant abstract patterns on the film itself, synchronising them to a popular dance tune by Don Baretto and His Cuban Orchestra. A panel of animation experts convened in 2005 by the Annecy Film Festival put this film among the top ten most significant works in the history of animation (his later film Free Radicals, not completed until 1979, was also in the top 50).

Lye also worked for the GPO Film Unit's successor, the Crown Film Unit producing wartime information films, such as Musical Poster Number One. On the basis of this work, Lye was later offered work for The March of Time newsreel in New York. Leaving his wife and children in England, Lye moved to New York in 1944.

In Free Radicals he used black film stock and scratched designs into the emulsion. The result was a dancing pattern of flashing lines and marks, as dramatic as lightning in the night sky. In 2008, this film was added to the United States National Film Registry.

Lye continued to experiment with the possibilities of direct film-making to the end of his life. In various films he used a range of dyes, stencils, air-brushes, felt tip pens, stamps, combs and surgical instruments, to create images and textures on celluloid. In Color Cry, he employed the "photogram" method combined with various stencils and fabrics to create abstract patterns. It is a 16mm direct film featuring a searing soundtrack by the blues singer Sonny Terry.

As a writer, Len Lye produced a body of work exploring his theory of IHN (Individual Happiness Now). He also wrote a large number of letters and poems. He was a friend of Dylan Thomas, and of Laura Riding and Robert Graves (their Seizin Press published No Trouble, a book drawn from Lye's letters to them, his mother, and others, in 1930). The NZEPC (New Zealand Electronic Poetry Centre) website contains a selection of Lye's writings, which are just as surprising and experimental as his work in other media. One of his theories was that artists attempt to reproduce themselves in their works, which he exposited in an essay complete with visual examples.

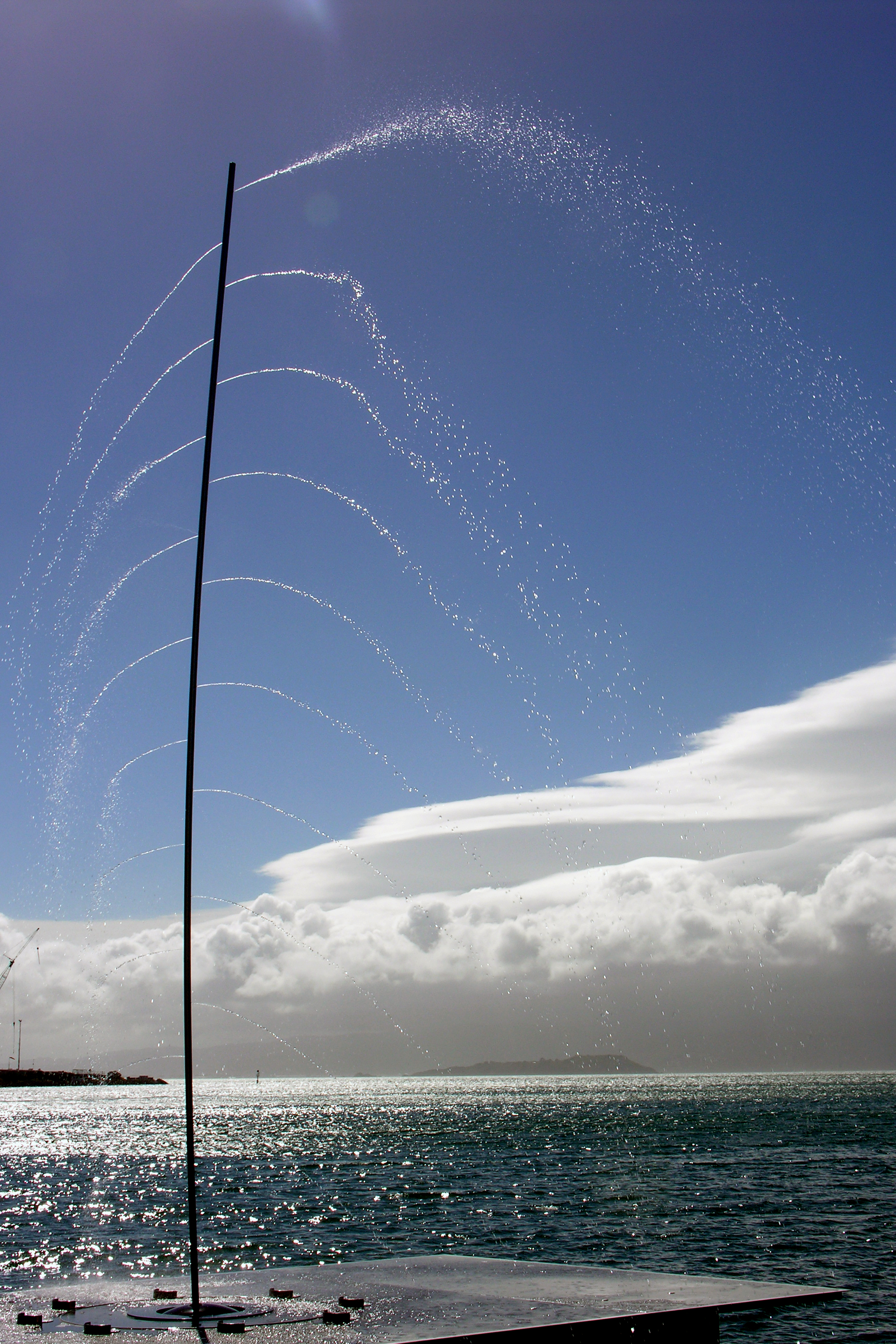
Water Whirler on the Wellington waterfront

Lye was also an important kinetic sculptor and what he referred to as "Tangibles". He saw film and kinetic sculpture as aspects of the same "art of motion", which he theorised in a highly original way in his essays (collected in the book Figures of Motion).

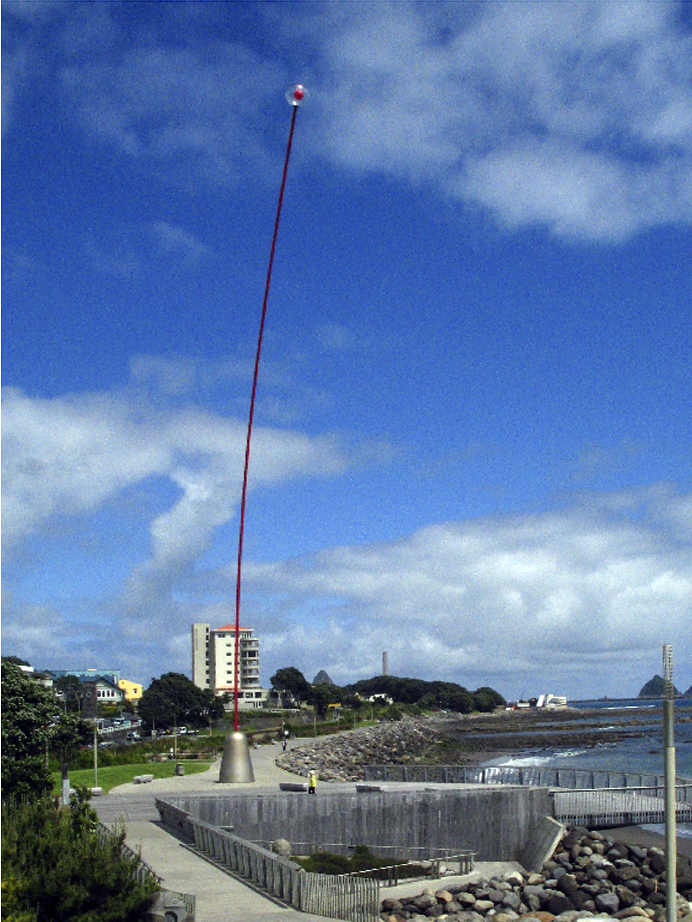
A 45m Wind Wand on the New Plymouth waterfront

Many of his kinetic works can be found at the Govett-Brewster Art Gallery in New Plymouth, Taranaki including a 45-metre high Wind Wand near the sea. The Water Whirler, designed by Lye but never realised in his lifetime, was installed on Wellington's waterfront in 2006. His "Tangibles" were shown at MOMA in New York in 1961 and are now found worldwide. In 1977, Len Lye returned to his homeland to oversee the first New Zealand exhibition of his work at the Govett-Brewster Art Gallery at that time under the directorship of Ron O'Reilly. Shortly before his death in 1980, Lye and his supporters established the Len Lye Foundation, to which he gave his work. The gallery is the repository for much of this collection, employing a full-time curator to ensure its preservation and appropriate exhibition.

Lye was a maverick, never fitting any of the usual art historical labels. Although he did not become a household name, his work was familiar to many film-makers and kinetic sculptors – he was something of an "artist's artist", and his innovations have had an international influence. He is also remembered for his colourful personality, amazing clothes, and highly unorthodox lecturing style (he taught at New York University for three years).

The 21st century has seen renewed international interest in Lye's career with retrospectives held at the Pompidou Centre, Paris in 2000, an Australian touring exhibition organised in 2001 by the Art Gallery of NSW, Sydney, at ACMI, Melbourne in 2009, and at Ikon Gallery, Birmingham, UK in 2010. Similarly, in New Zealand, surveys have been shown at the Gus Fisher Gallery, Auckland in 2009, and City Gallery Wellington in 2013. The University of Auckland staged an opera Len Lye the opera, composed by Eve de Castro-Robinson, about his life in 2012.

== Personal life ==
Lye was married twice. His first wife was Jane (Florence Winifred) Thompson with whom he had two children:

- Bix Lye, also a sculptor, who lived and worked in Williamsburg, New York and Newburgh New York. Died January 2023.
- Yancy Ning Lou Lye (born 20 May 1940, Chiswick, London)

In Reno, Nevada, in May 1948, Lye married his second wife, Annette "Ann" Zeiss (born 1910, Minnesota) on the same day he obtained a divorce from Jane. Ann was formerly married to Tommy Hindle, a British journalist.

He died in Warwick, New York, in 1980.

== Legacy ==
In 1971 artist Ray Thorburn met with Len Lye and on his return to New Zealand attempted to arrange an exhibition at the National Art Gallery but was rejected. The director of the Govett-Brewster Art Gallery Bob Ballard and local engineer John Matthews were more receptive resulting in Thorburn and Matthews going to New York to discuss an exhibition and the construction of a large work Trilogy with Lye. In 1977 Hamish Keith, Matthews and Thorburn set in motion the formation of a non-profit foundation and in 1980 a Trust Deed resulted in the Len Lye gift to the gallery. The Len Lye Collection and Archive consists of all non-film works in Lye’s possession at the time of his death in 1980, as well as several items that have been given to or otherwise acquired by the Foundation since. This body of work is extended by Len Lye works in the Govett-Brewster Art Gallery. Ngā Taonga Sound & Vision (formerly the New Zealand Film Archive) is the repository of Lye’s film prints that are owned by the Len Lye Foundation, and viewing prints are also in the Collection at the Govett-Brewster. The Len Lye Centre a dedicated gallery for the Len Lye collection connected to the Govett-Brewster was opened on 25 July 2015. This is the first gallery in New Zealand to be dedicated to a single artist.

There are two documentaries about Lye: Flip and Two Twisters, directed by Shirley Horrocks and Doodlin', and a DVD of Lye's talks illustrated with slides: Len Lye Talks about Art.

== Filmography ==
- Tusalava 10 min (1929)
- The Peanut Vendor 2 min (1933)
- A Colour Box 4 min (1935) in Dufaycolor
- Kaleidoscope 4 min (1935) in Dufaycolor
- The Birth of the Robot 7 min (1936) in Gasparcolor
- Rainbow Dance 5 min (1936) in Gasparcolor
- Trade Tattoo (1937) 5 min in Technicolor
- North or Northwest? (N or NW?) 7 min (1938)
- Colour Flight 4 min (1937) in Gasparcolor
- Swinging the Lambeth Walk 4 min (1939) in Dufaycolor
- Musical Poster #1 3 min (1940) in Technicolor
- When the Pie Was Opened 8 min (1941)
- Newspaper Train 5 min (1942)
- Work Party 7 min (1942)
- Kill or Be Killed 18 min (1942)
- Collapsible Metal Tubes 90 sec (1942)
- Planned Crops 90 sec (1942)
- Cameramen at War 17 min (1943)
- Color Cry 3 min (1952)
- Full Fathom Five 1 min (1953)
- Life's Musical Minute 1 min (1953)
- All Soul's Carnival 16 min (1957)
- Rhythm 1 min (1957)
- Free Radicals 5 min (1958, revised 1979)
- Prime Time 1 min (1958)
- Fountain of Hope 1 min (1959)
- Particles in Space 4 min (1966)
- Tal Farlow 1min 30sec (completed posthumously, 1980)

== Bibliography ==
- Len Lye, Zizz!: The Life and Art of Len Lye in his Own Words, ed. Roger Horrocks, Wellington, Awa Press. ISBN 978-1-927249-21-5
