= Italianate architecture =

19th-century phase of Classical architecture

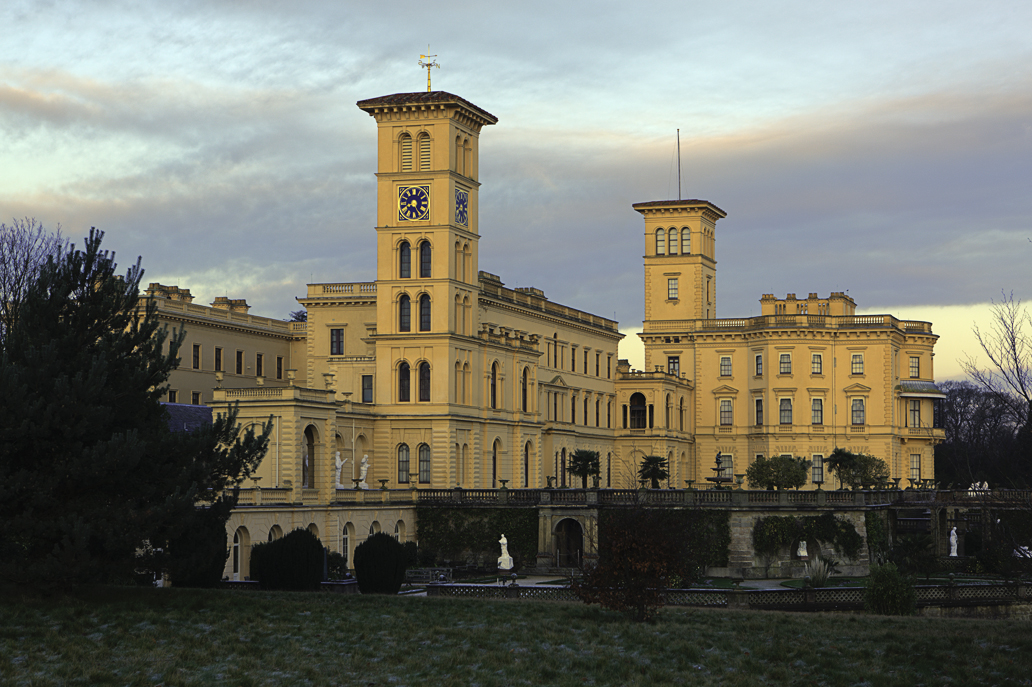
Osborne House on the Isle of Wight, England, built between 1845 and 1851. It exhibits three typical Italianate features: a prominently bracketed cornice, towers based on Italian campanili and belvederes, and adjoining arched windows.

The Italianate style was a distinct 19th-century phase in the history of Classical architecture. Like Palladianism and Neoclassicism, the Italianate style combined its inspiration from the models and architectural vocabulary of 16th-century Italian Renaissance architecture with picturesque aesthetics. The resulting style of architecture was essentially of its own time. "The backward look transforms its object," Siegfried Giedion wrote of historicist architectural styles; "every spectator at every period—at every moment, indeed—inevitably transforms the past according to his own nature."

The Italianate style was first developed in Britain in about 1802 by John Nash, with the construction of Cronkhill in Shropshire. This small country house is generally accepted to be the first Italianate villa in England, from which is derived the Italianate architecture of the late Regency and early Victorian eras. The Italianate style was further developed and popularised by the architect Sir Charles Barry in the 1830s. Barry's Italianate style (occasionally termed "Barryesque") drew heavily for its motifs on the buildings of the Italian Renaissance, though sometimes at odds with Nash's semi-rustic Italianate villas.

The style was employed in varying forms abroad long after its decline in popularity in Britain. For example, from the late 1840s to 1890, it achieved huge popularity in the United States, where it was promoted by the architect Alexander Jackson Davis.

== Elements ==
Key visual components of this style include:

- Low-pitched or flat roofs; roof is frequently hipped
- Projecting eaves supported by corbels
- Imposing cornice structures
- Pedimented windows and doors
- Arch-headed, pedimented or Serlian windows with pronounced architraves and archivolts
- Tall first floor windows suggesting a piano nobile
- Belvedere or machicolated signorial towers
- Cupolas
- Quoins
- Loggias
- Balustrades concealing the roof-scape
- About 15% of Italianate houses in the United States include a tower

== By region ==
=== England and Wales ===
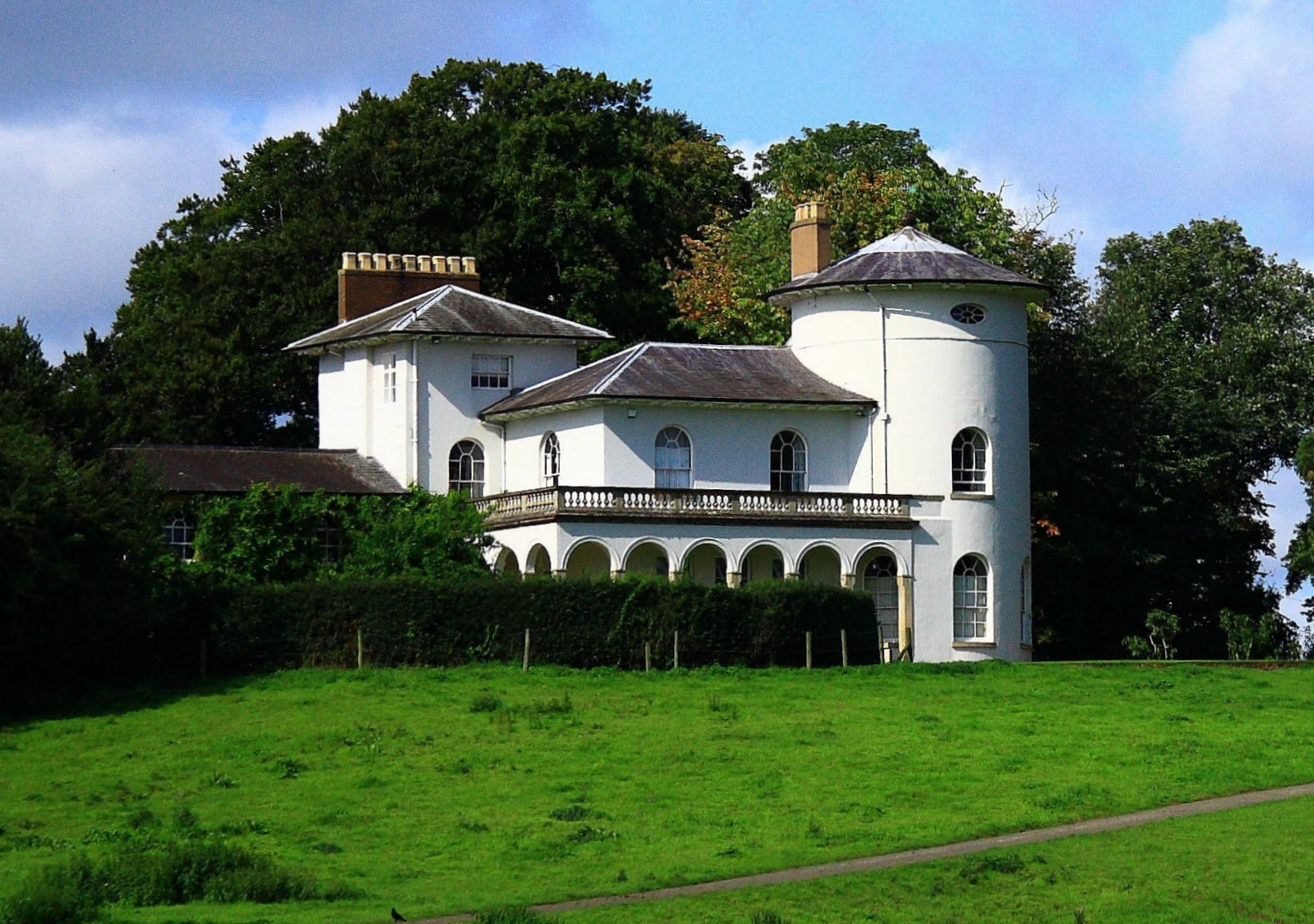
Cronkhill, designed by John Nash, the earliest Italianate villa in England

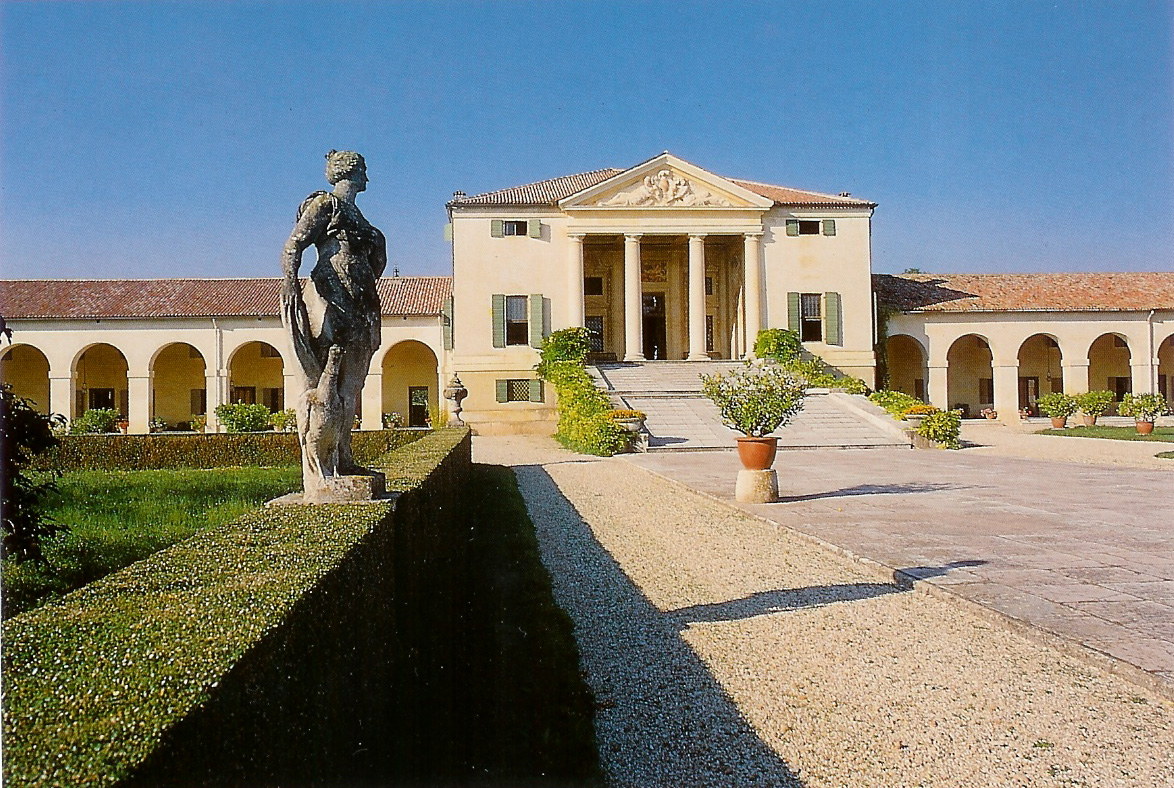
Villa Emo by Palladio, 1559. The great Italian villas were often a starting point for the buildings of the 19th-century Italianate style.

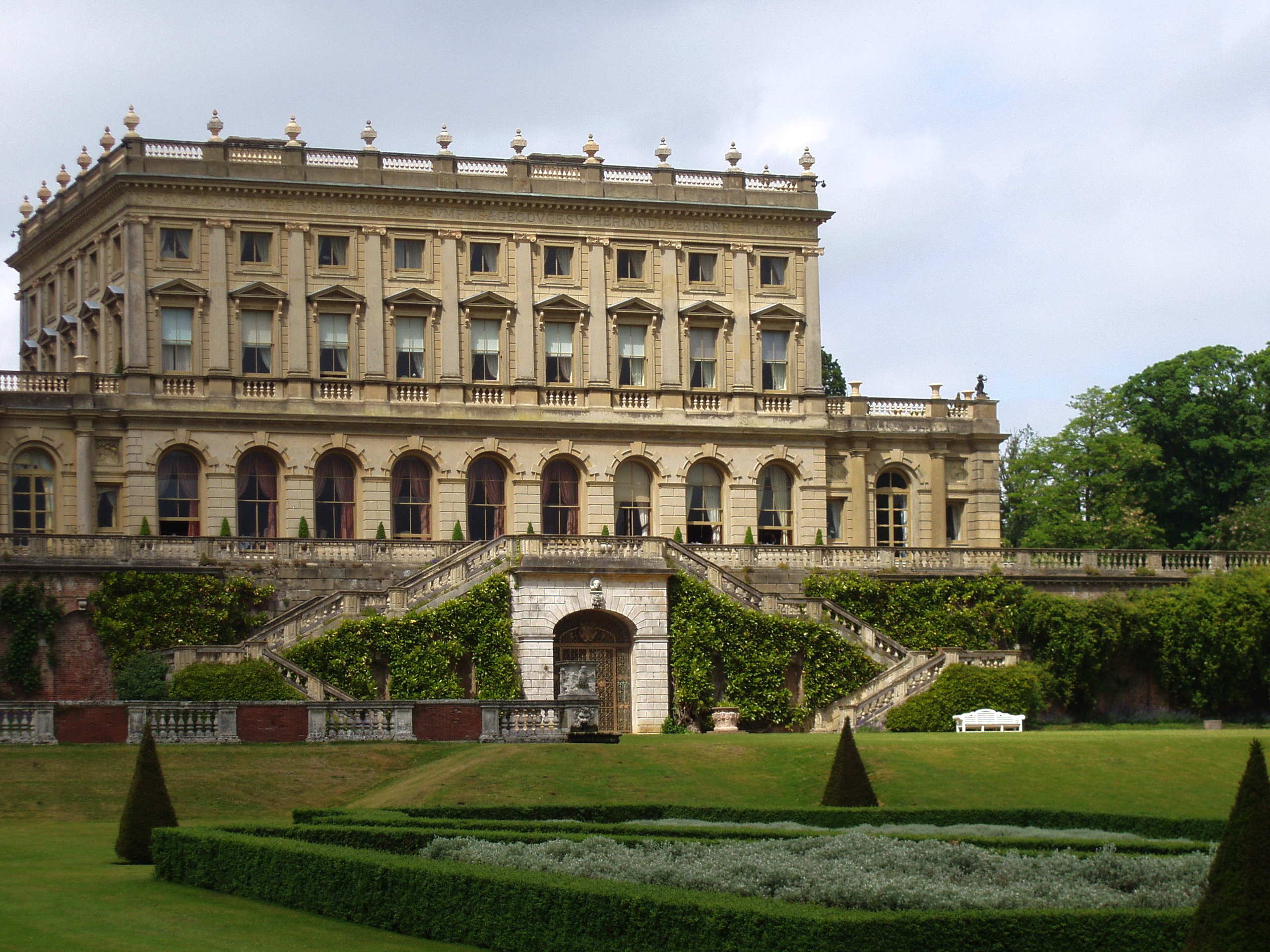
Cliveden: Charles Barry's Italianate, Neo-Renaissance mansion with "confident allusions to the wealth of Italian merchant princes."

A late intimation of John Nash's development of the Italianate style was his 1805 design of Sandridge Park at Stoke Gabriel in Devon. Commissioned by the dowager Lady Ashburton as a country retreat, this small country house clearly shows the transition between the picturesque of William Gilpin and Nash's yet to be fully evolved Italianism. While this house can still be described as Regency, its informal asymmetrical plan together with its loggias and balconies of both stone and wrought iron; tower and low pitched roof clearly are very similar to the fully Italianate design of Cronkhill, the house generally considered to be the first example of the Italianate style in Britain.

Later examples of the Italianate style in England tend to take the form of Palladian-style building often enhanced by a belvedere tower complete with Renaissance-type balustrading at the roof level. This is generally a more stylistic interpretation of what architects and patrons imagined to be the case in Italy and utilises more obviously the Italian Renaissance motifs than those earlier examples of the Italianate style by Nash.

Sir Charles Barry, most notable for his works on the Tudor and Gothic styles at the Houses of Parliament in London, was a great promoter of the style. Unlike Nash, he found his inspiration in Italy itself. Barry drew heavily on the designs of the original Renaissance villas of Rome, the Lazio and the Veneto or as he put it: "...the charming character of the irregular villas of Italy." His most defining work in this style was the large Neo-Renaissance mansion Cliveden, while the Reform Club 1837–1841 in Pall Mall represents a convincingly authentic pastiche of the Palazzo Farnese in Rome, albeit in a 'Grecian' Ionic order in place of Michelangelo's original Corinthian order. Although it has been claimed that one-third of early Victorian country houses in England used classical styles, mostly Italianate, by 1855 the style was falling from favour, and Cliveden came to be regarded as "a declining essay in a declining fashion."

Anthony Salvin occasionally designed in the Italianate style, especially in Wales, at Hafod House, Carmarthenshire, and Penoyre House, Powys, described by Mark Girouard as "Salvin's most ambitious classical house."

Thomas Cubitt, a London building contractor, incorporated simple classical lines of the Italianate style as defined by Sir Charles Barry into many of his London terraces. Cubitt designed Osborne House under the direction of Prince Albert of Saxe-Coburg and Gotha, and it is Cubitt's reworking of his two-dimensional street architecture into this freestanding mansion which was to be the inspiration for countless Italianate villas throughout the British Empire.

Following the completion of Osborne House in 1851, the style became a popular choice of design for the small mansions built by the new and wealthy industrialists of the era. These were mostly built in cities surrounded by large but not extensive gardens, often laid out in a terrace Tuscan style as well. On occasions very similar, if not identical, designs to these Italianate villas would be topped by mansard roofs, and then termed chateauesque. However, "after a modest spate of Italianate villas, and French chateaux" by 1855 the most favoured style of an English country house was Gothic, Tudor, or Elizabethan. The Italianate style came to the small town of Newton Abbot and the village of Starcross in Devon, with Isambard Brunel's atmospheric railway pumping houses. The style was later used by Humphrey Abberley and Joseph Rowell, who designed a large number of houses, with the new railway station as the focal point, for Lord Courtenay, who saw the potential of the railway age.

An example that is not very well known, but a clear example of Italianate architecture, is St. Christopher's Anglican church in Hinchley Wood, Surrey, particularly given the design of its bell tower.

Portmeirion in Gwynedd, North Wales, is an architectural fantasy designed in a southern Italian Baroque style and built by Sir Clough Williams-Ellis between 1925 and 1975 in a loose style of an Italian village. It is now owned by a charitable trust. Williams-Ellis incorporated fragments of demolished buildings, including works by a number of other architects. Portmeirion's architectural bricolage and deliberately fanciful nostalgia have been noted as an influence on the development of postmodernism in architecture in the late 20th century.

=== Scotland ===
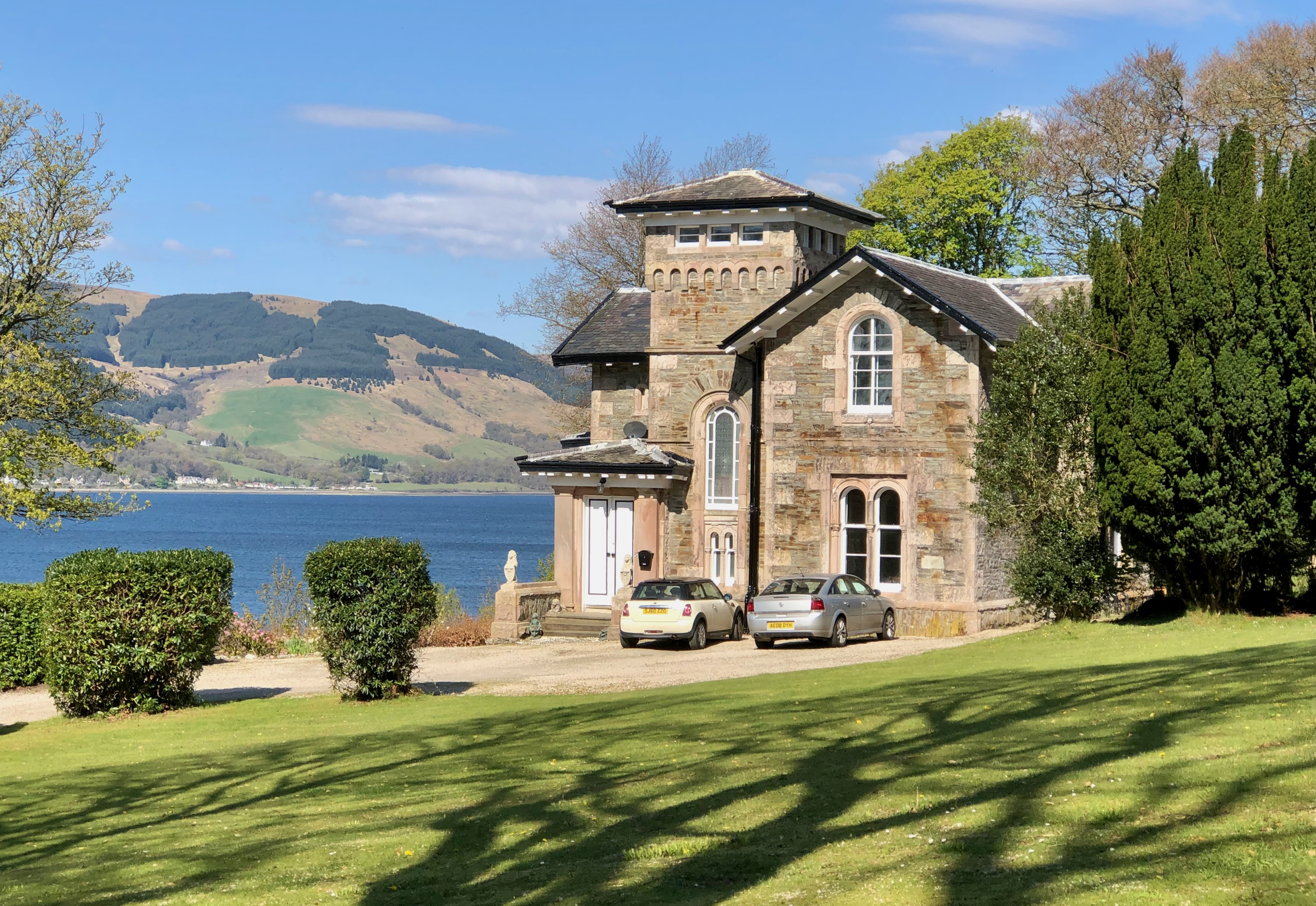
Thomson's Italian Villa, Craig Ailey

The Italianate revival was comparatively less prevalent in Scottish architecture, examples include some of the early work of Alexander Thomson ("Greek" Thomson) and buildings such as the west side of George Square.

=== Lebanon ===
The Italian, specifically Tuscan, influence on architecture in Lebanon dates back to the Renaissance when Fakhreddine, the first Lebanese ruler who truly unified Mount Lebanon with its Mediterranean coast, executed an ambitious plan to develop his country.

When the Ottomans exiled Fakhreddine to Tuscany in 1613, he entered an alliance with the Medici. Upon his return to Lebanon in 1618, he began modernising Lebanon. He developed a silk industry, upgraded olive oil production, and brought with him numerous Italian engineers who began building mansions and civil buildings throughout the country. The cities of Beirut and Sidon were especially built in the Italianate style. The influence of these buildings, such as those in Deir el Qamar, influenced building in Lebanon for many centuries and continues to the present time. For example, streets like Rue Gouraud continue to have numerous, historic houses with Italianate influence.

=== Russia ===
Before the invention of the Italianate style, Italian styles were already present in Russia because of work by hired Italian masters. Later in the Russian Empire, elements of Italianate made it into standardized building plans. Moscow Leningradsky railway station is an example of this, featuring a tower and other distinctive details. Before 1960s, the Soviet Union also encorporated Italianate-inspired designs into its architecture.

=== United States ===
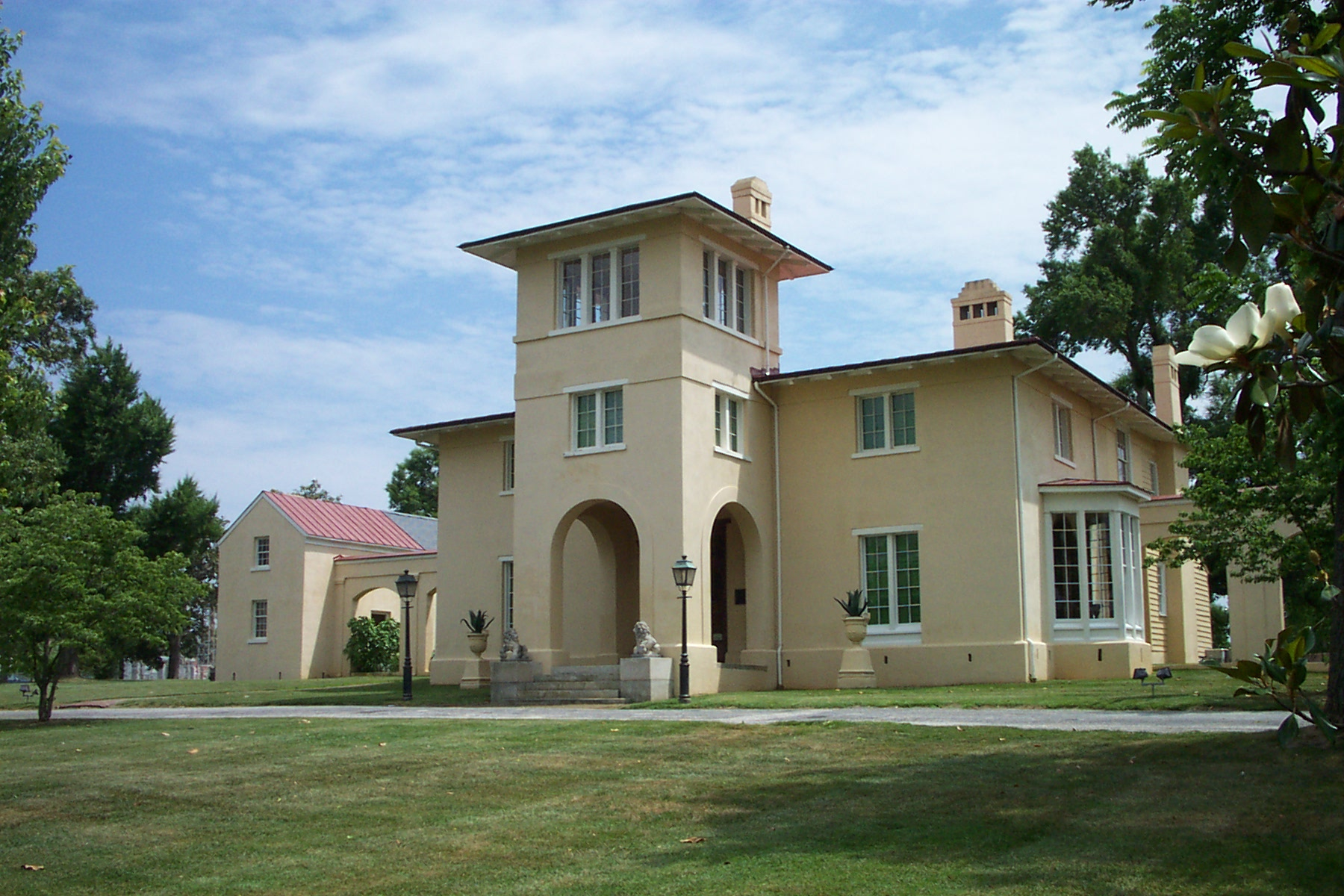
Blandwood Mansion and Gardens in Greensboro, North Carolina

==== United States East Coast ====
The Italianate style was popularized in the United States by Alexander Jackson Davis in the 1840s as an alternative to Gothic Revival or Greek Revival styles. Davis' design for Blandwood is the oldest surviving example of Italianate architecture in the United States, constructed in 1844 as the residence of North Carolina Governor John Motley Morehead. It is an early example of Italianate architecture, closer in ethos to the Italianate works of Nash than the more Renaissance-inspired designs of Barry. Davis' 1854 Litchfield Villa in Prospect Park, Brooklyn is an example of the style. It was initially referred to as the "Italian Villa" or "Tuscan Villa" style. Richard Upjohn used the style extensively, beginning in 1845 with the Edward King House. Other leading practitioners of the style were John Notman and Henry Austin. Notman designed "Riverside" in 1837, the first "Italian Villa" style house in Burlington, New Jersey (now destroyed).

Italianate was reinterpreted to become an indigenous style. It is distinctive by its pronounced exaggeration of many Italian Renaissance characteristics: emphatic eaves supported by corbels, low-pitched roofs barely discernible from the ground, or even flat roofs with a wide projection. A tower is often incorporated hinting at the Italian belvedere or even campanile tower. Motifs drawn from the Italianate style were incorporated into the commercial builders' repertoire and appear in Victorian architecture dating from the mid-to-late 19th century.

This architectural style became more popular than Greek Revival by the beginning of the Civil War. Its popularity was due to being suitable for many different building materials and budgets, as well as the development of cast-iron and press-metal technology making the production more efficient of decorative elements such as brackets and cornices. However, the style was superseded in popularity in the late 1870s by the Queen Anne and Colonial Revival styles.

==== Other U.S. regions ====
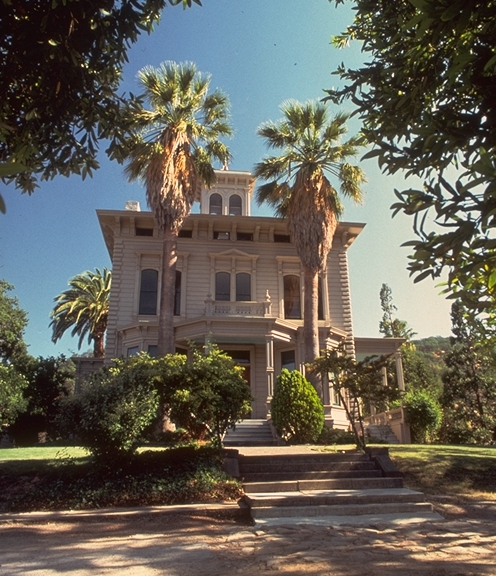
The Italianate 1883 John Muir Mansion in Martinez, California

The popularity of Italianate architecture in the time period following 1845 can be seen in Cincinnati, Ohio, the United States' first boomtown west of the Appalachian Mountains. This city, which grew along with the traffic on the Ohio River, features arguably the largest single collection of Italianate buildings in the United States in its Over-the-Rhine neighbourhood, built primarily by German-American immigrants that lived in the densely populated area. In recent years, increased attention has been called to the preservation of this impressive collection, with large-scale renovation efforts beginning to repair urban blight. Cincinnati's neighbouring cities of Newport and Covington, Kentucky also contain an impressive collection of Italianate architecture.

The Garden District of New Orleans features examples of the Italianate style, including:

- 1331 First Street, designed by Samuel Jamison,
- the Van Benthuysen-Elms Mansion at 3029 St. Charles Avenue, and
- 2805 Carondelet Street (technically located a block outside the Garden District).

In California, the earliest Victorian residences were wooden versions of the Italianate style, such as the James Lick Mansion, John Muir Mansion, and Bidwell Mansion, before later Stick-Eastlake and Queen Anne styles superseded. Many, nicknamed Painted Ladies, remain and are celebrated in San Francisco. A late example in masonry is the First Church of Christ, Scientist in Los Angeles.

Additionally, the United States Lighthouse Board, through the work of Colonel Orlando M. Poe, produced a number of Italianate lighthouses and associated structures, chief among them being the Grosse Point Light in Evanston, Illinois.

=== Australia ===
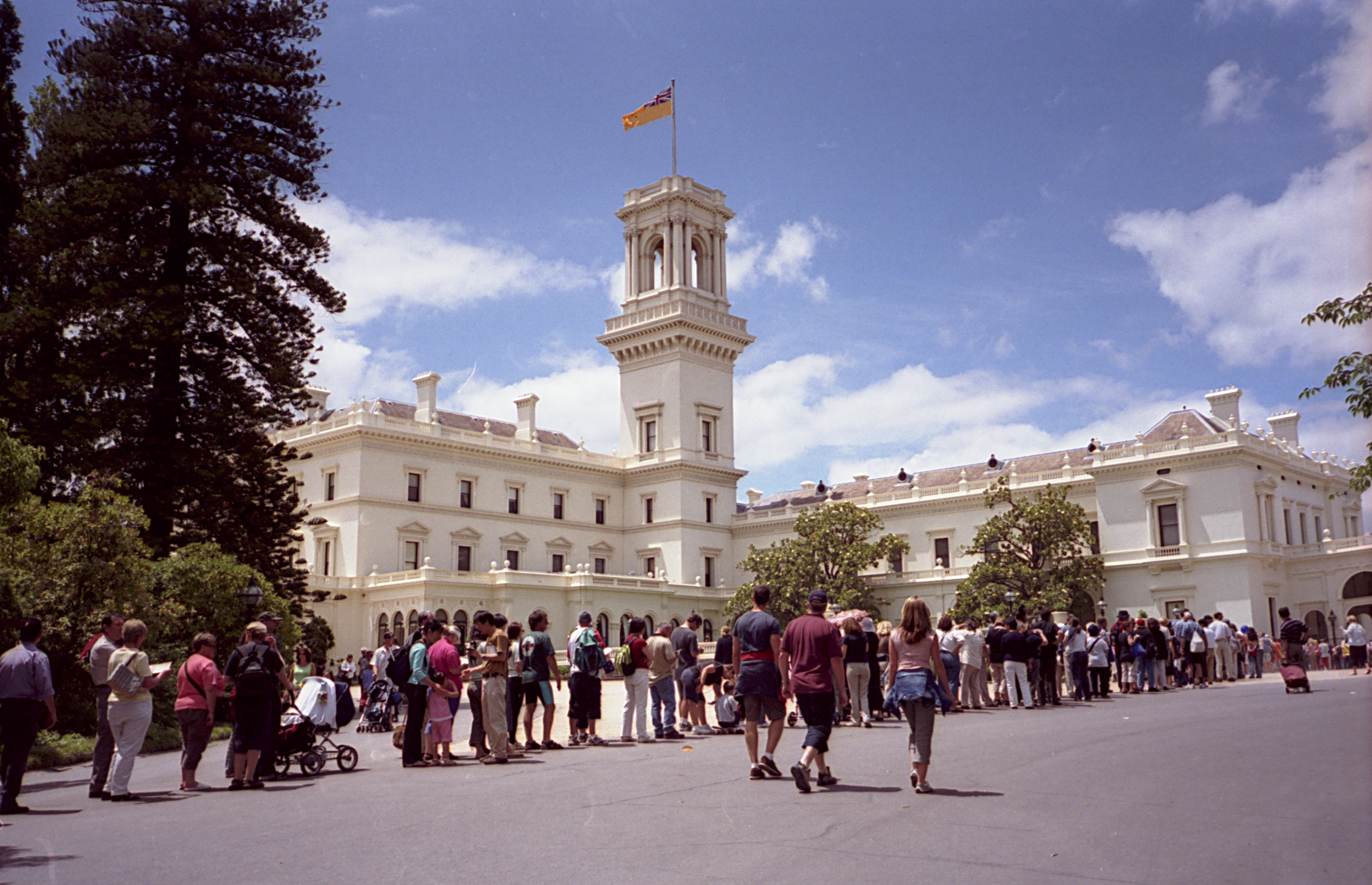
Government House, Melbourne, completed in 1876

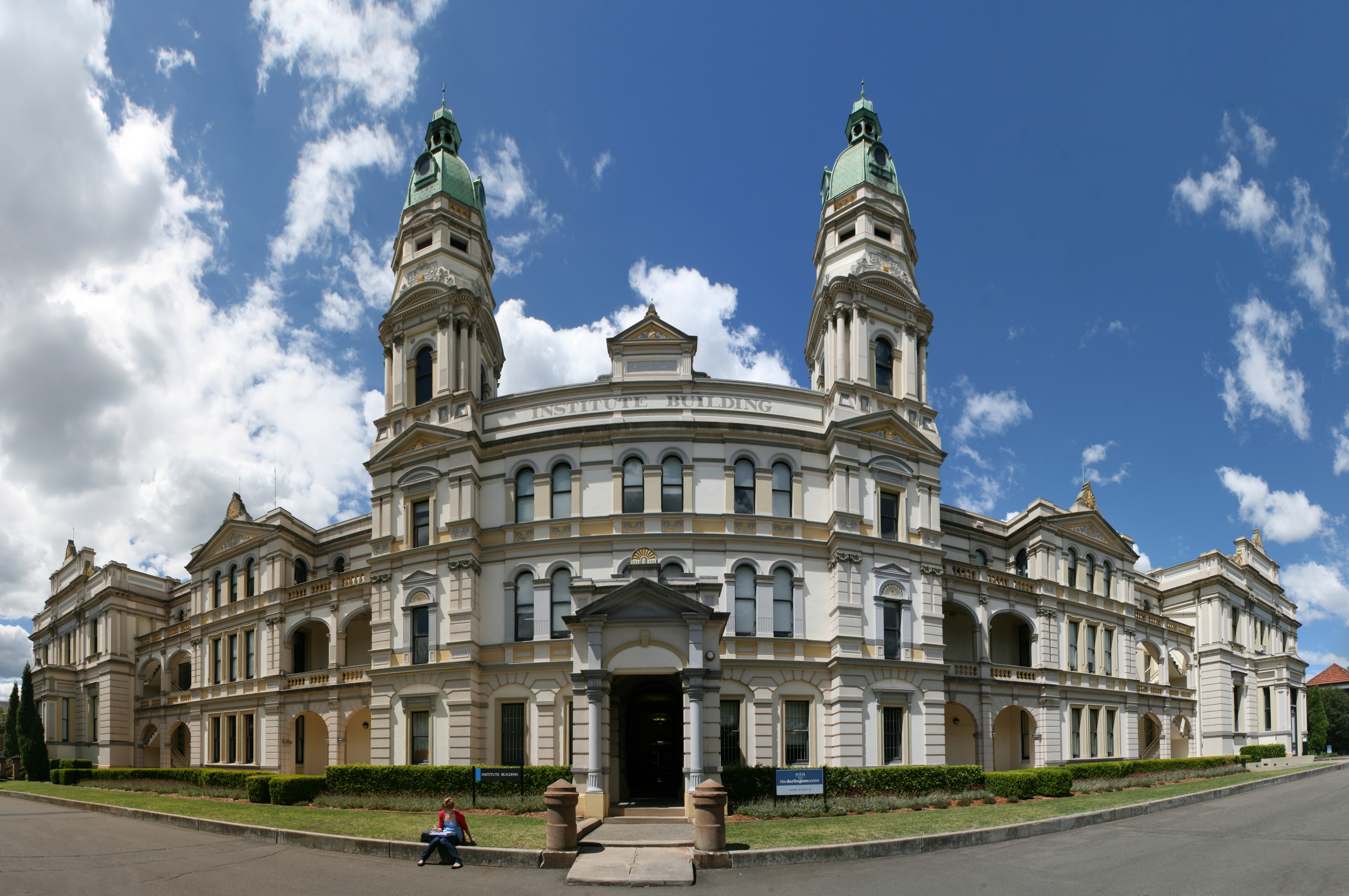
The Institute Building at the University of Sydney in Darlington, Sydney

The Italianate style was immensely popular in Australia as a domestic style influencing the rapidly expanding suburbs of the 1870–1880s and providing rows of neat villas with low-pitched roofs, bay windows, tall windows and classical cornices. The architect William Wardell designed Government House in Melbourne—the official residence of the governor of Victoria—as an example of his "newly discovered love for Italianate, Palladian and Venetian architecture." Cream-colored, with many Palladian features, it would not be out of place among the unified streets and squares in Thomas Cubitt's Belgravia, London, except for its machicolated signorial tower that Wardell crowned with a belvedere.

The hipped roof is concealed by a balustraded parapet. The principal block is flanked by two lower asymmetrical secondary wings that contribute picturesque massing, best appreciated from an angled view. The larger of these is divided from the principal block by the belvedere tower. The smaller, the ballroom block, is entered through a columned porte-cochère designed as a single storey prostyle portico.

Many examples of this style are evident around Sydney and Melbourne, notably the Old Treasury Building (1858), Leichhardt Town Hall (1888), Glebe Town Hall (1879) and the fine range of state and federal government offices facing the gardens in Treasury Place. No.2 Treasury Gardens (1874). This dignified, but not overly exuberant style for civil service offices contrasted with the grand and more formal statements of the classical styles used for Parliament buildings. The acceptance of the Italianate style for government offices was sustained well into the 20th century when, in 1912, John Smith Murdoch designed the Commonwealth Office Buildings as a sympathetic addition to this precinct to form a stylistically unified terrace overlooking the gardens.

The Italianate style of architecture continued to be built in outposts of the British Empire long after it had ceased to be fashionable in Britain itself. The Albury railway station in regional New South Wales, completed in 1881, is an example of this further evolution of the style.

=== New Zealand ===
As in Australia, the use of Italianate for public service offices took hold but using local materials like timber to create the illusion of stone. At the time it was built in 1856, the official residence of the Colonial Governor in Auckland was criticized for the dishonesty of making wood look like stone. The 1875 Old Government Buildings, Wellington are entirely constructed with local kauri timber, which has excellent properties for construction. (Auckland developed later and preferred Gothic detailing.) As in the United States, the timber construction common in New Zealand allowed this popular style to be rendered in domestic buildings, such as Antrim House in Wellington, and Westoe Farm House in Rangitikei (1874), as well as rendered brick at "The Pah" in Auckland (1880).

On a more domestic scale, the suburbs of cities like Dunedin and Wellington spread out with modest but handsome suburban villas with Italianate details, such as low-pitched roofs, tall windows, corner quoins, and stone detailing, all rendered in wood. A good example is the birthplace of the writer Katherine Mansfield.

== Image galleries ==
=== Great Britain ===
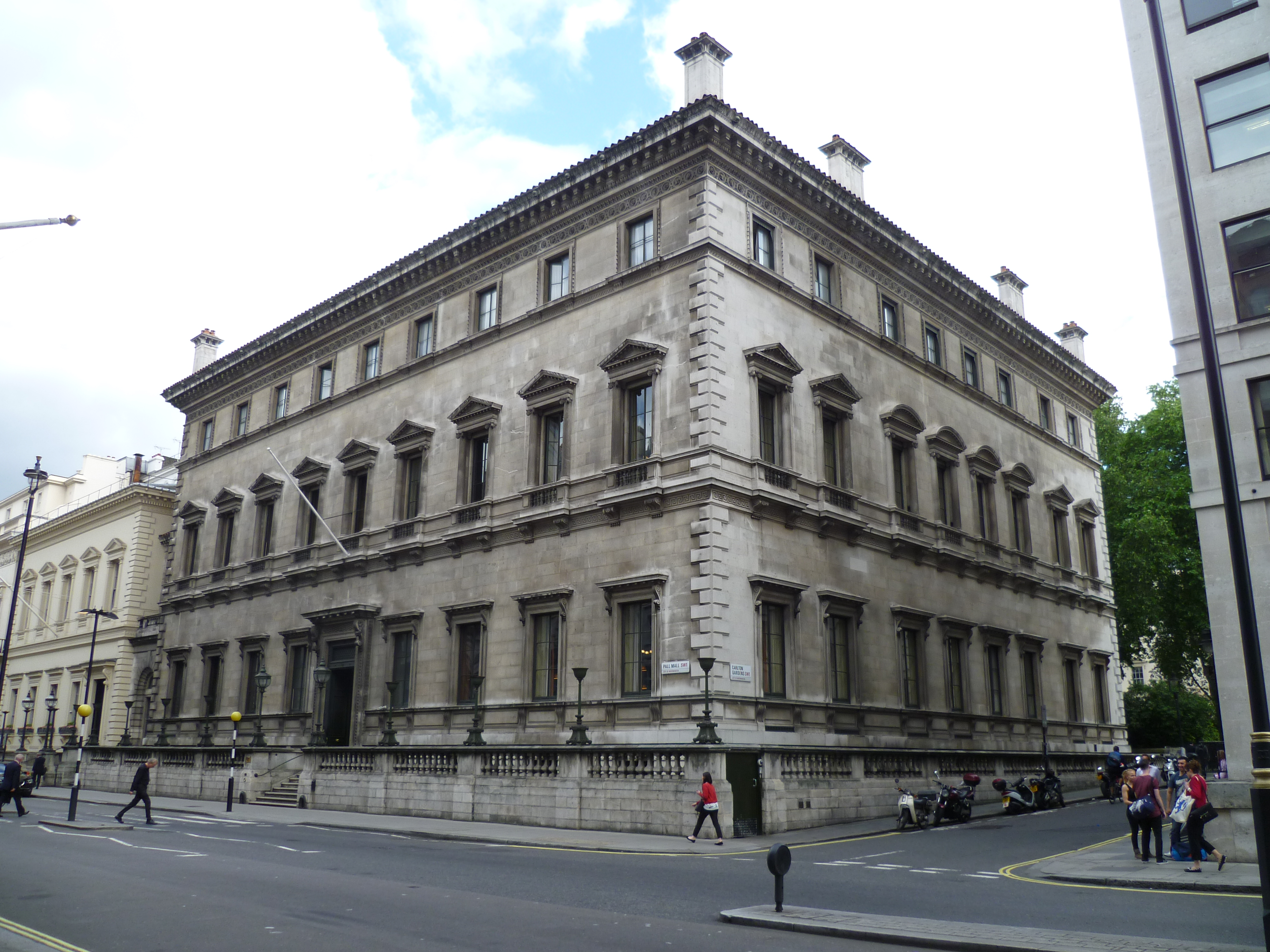
The Reform Club (1837–41) in Pall Mall by Barry was highly influential in its design and context at the heart of power structures in London.

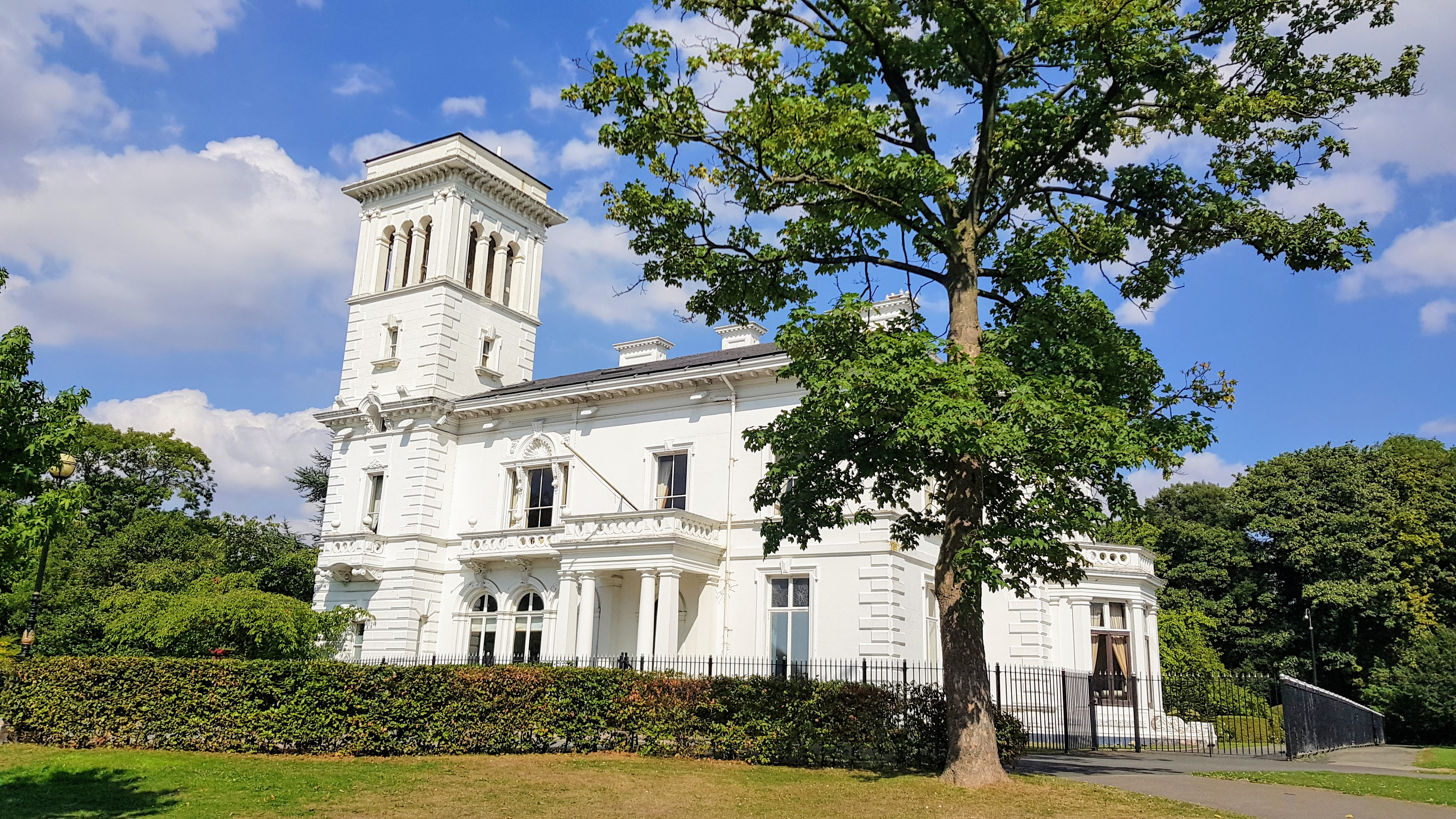
The main aspect and belvedere of Runcorn Town Hall in Cheshire, England

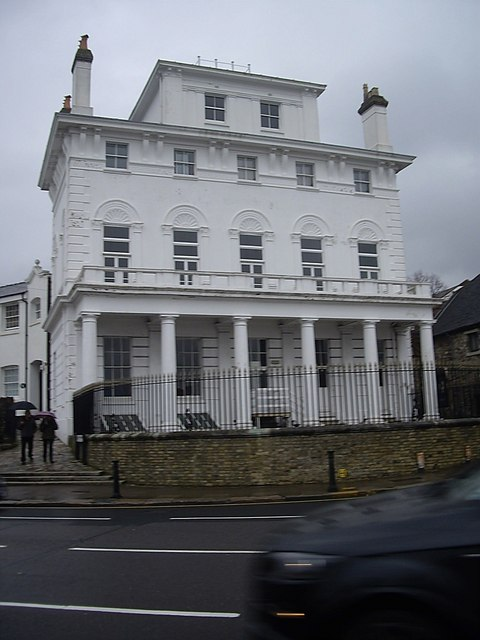
The former headquarters of the Royal Southern Yacht Club in Southampton, England, built in 1846

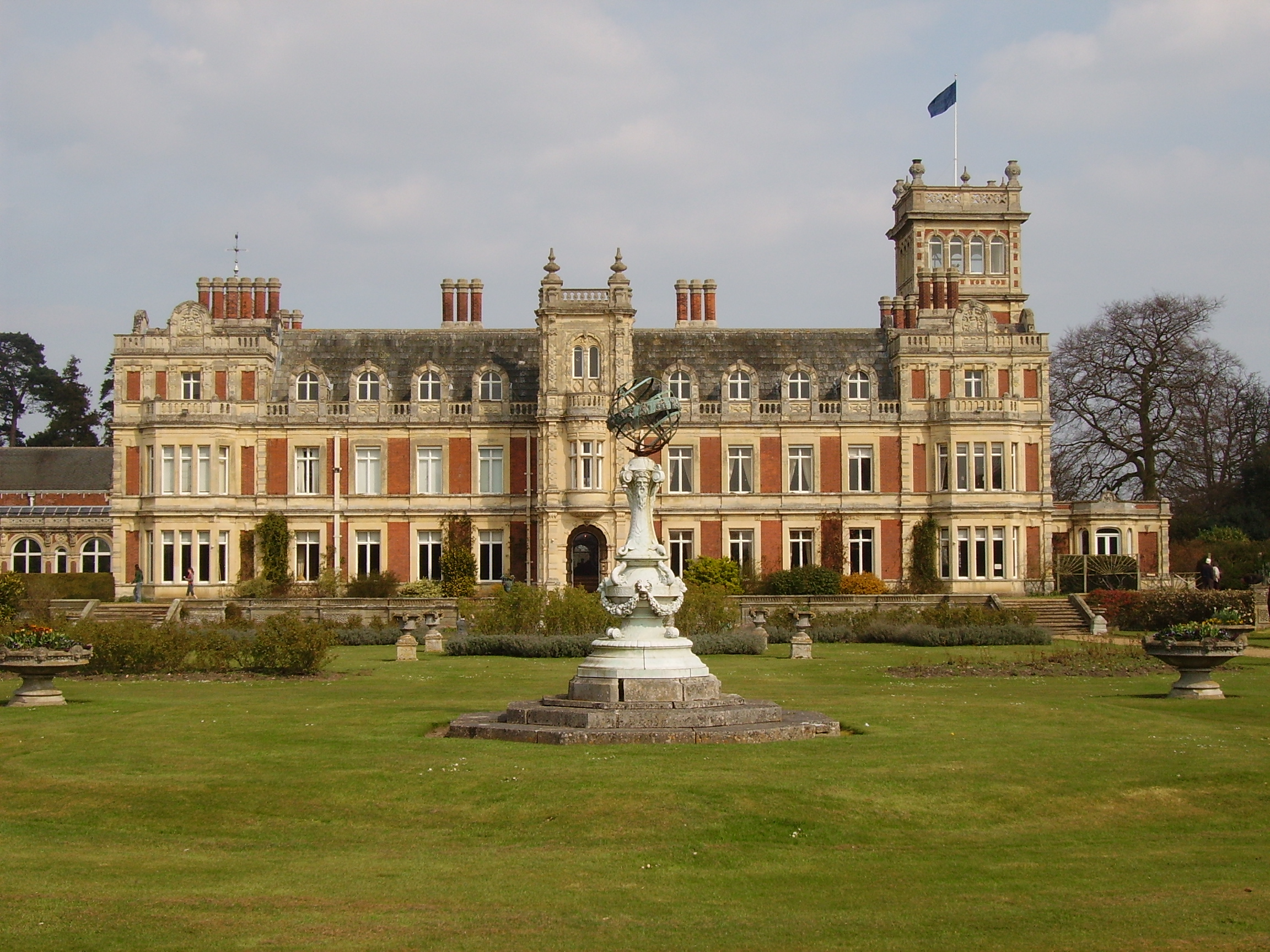
Somerleyton Hall near Lowestoft and Great Yarmouth on the east coast of East Anglia

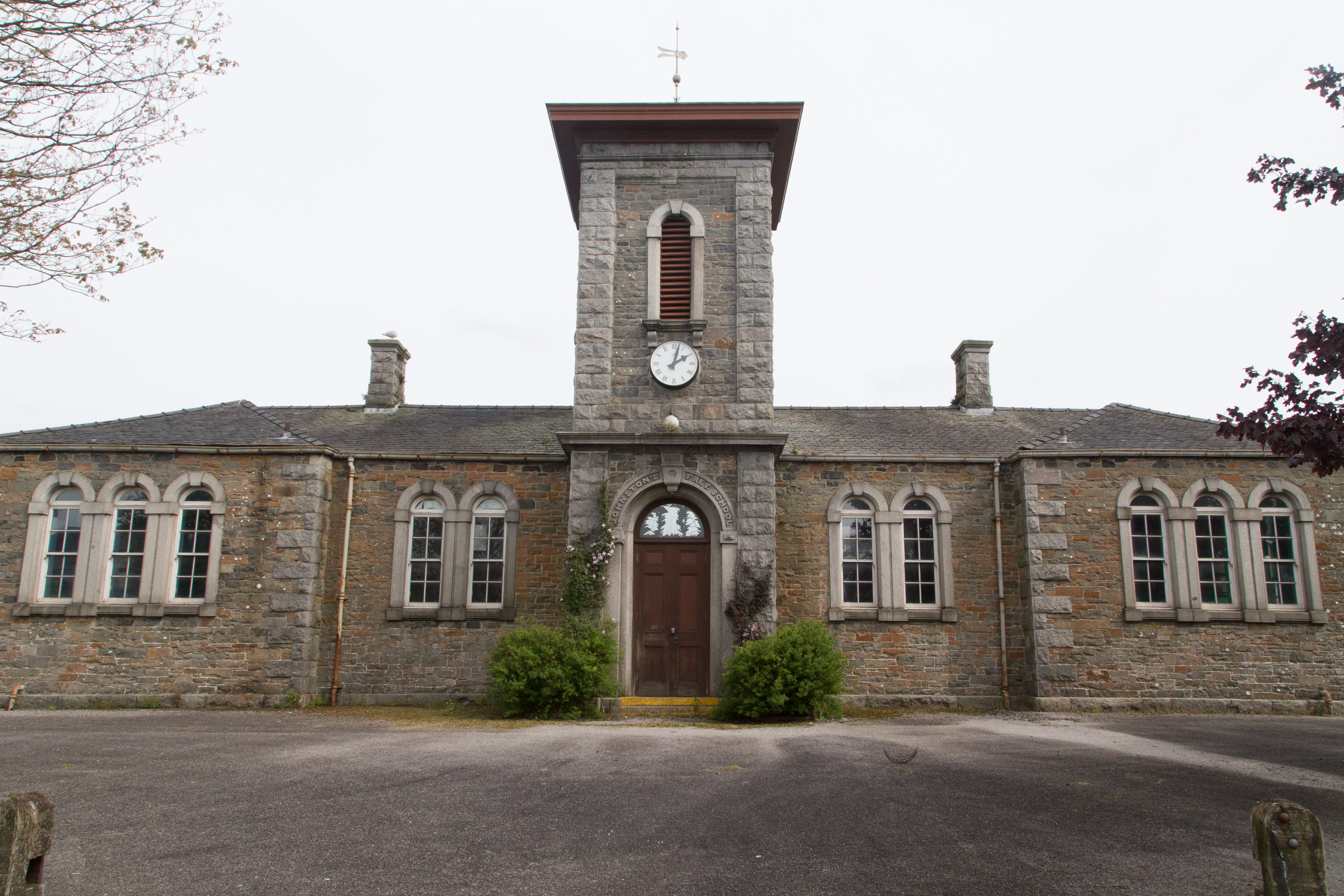
Johnston School, Kirkcudbright, built 1847

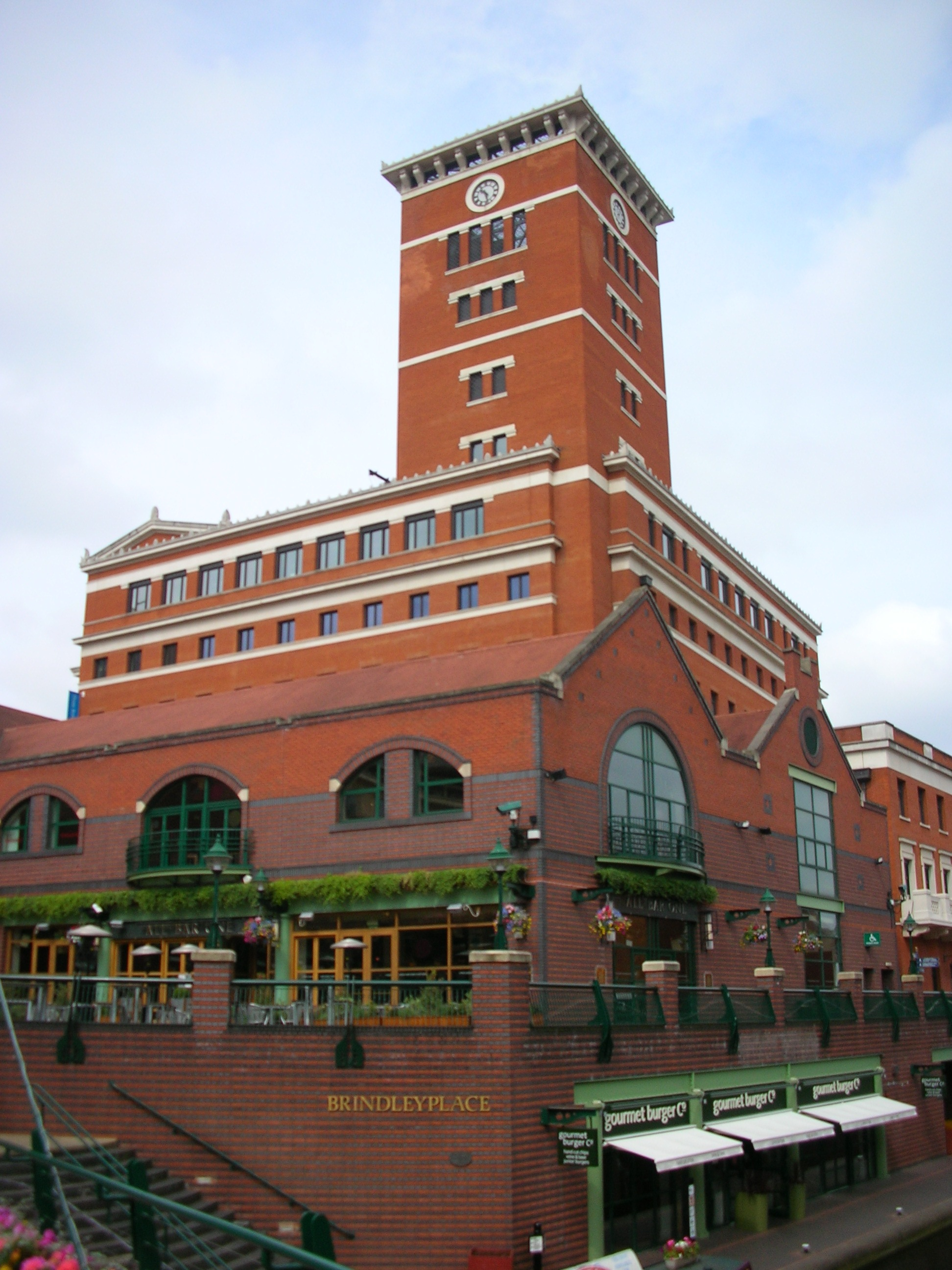
Contemporary Italianate inspired development in Brindleyplace, Birmingham.

=== United States ===
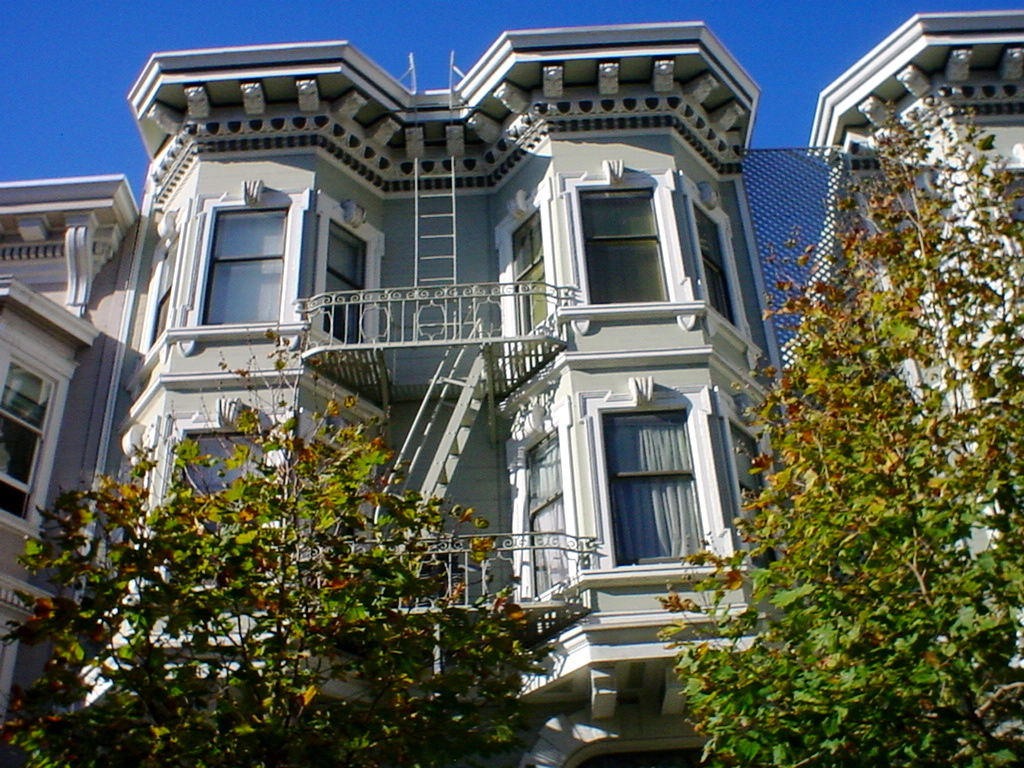
Italianate Victorian Painted Lady in San Francisco, California

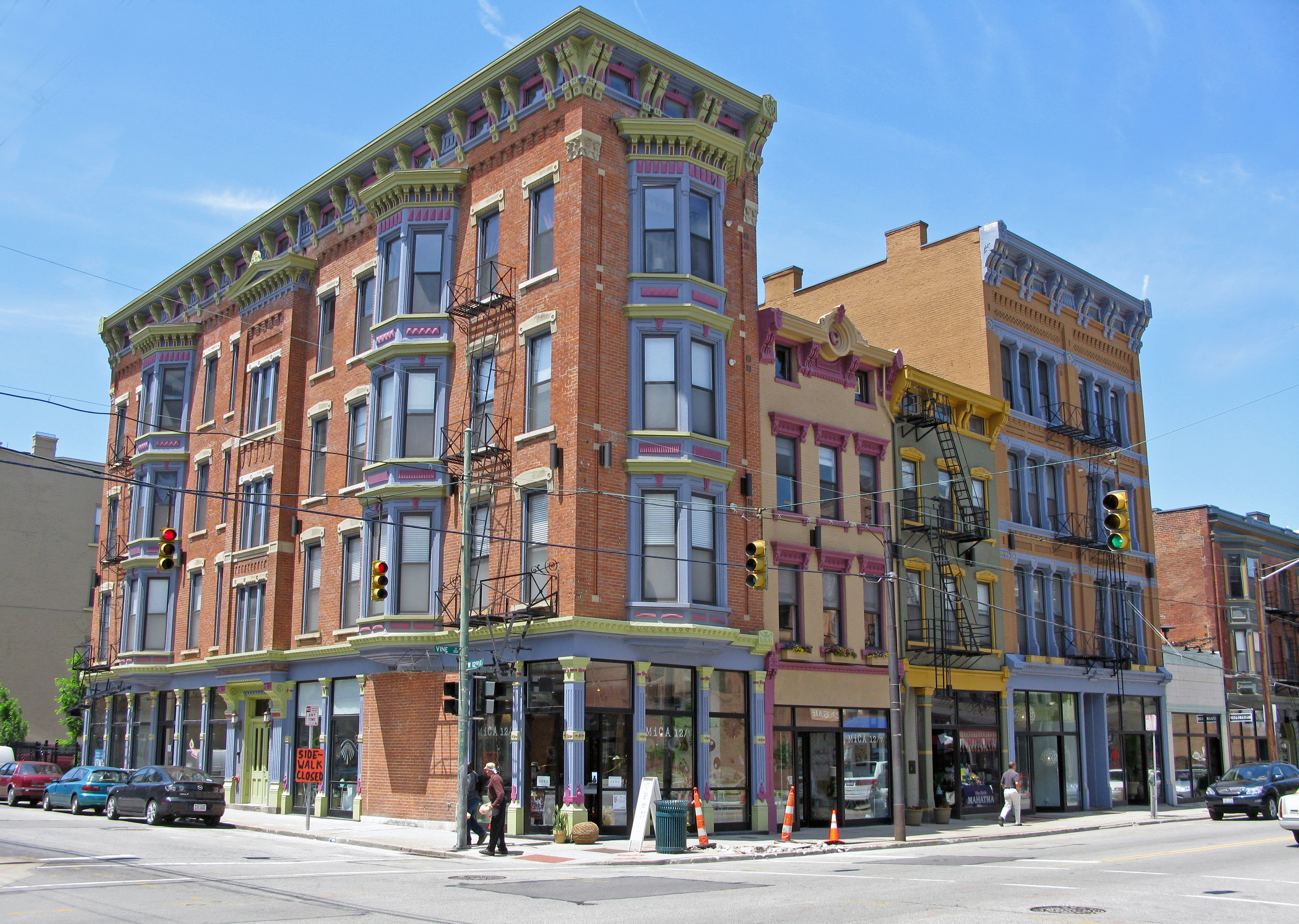
Series of Italianate tenements in Over-The-Rhine, Cincinnati, Ohio

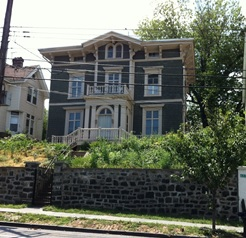
Boardman–Mitchell House Located in Stapleton, Staten Island, NY

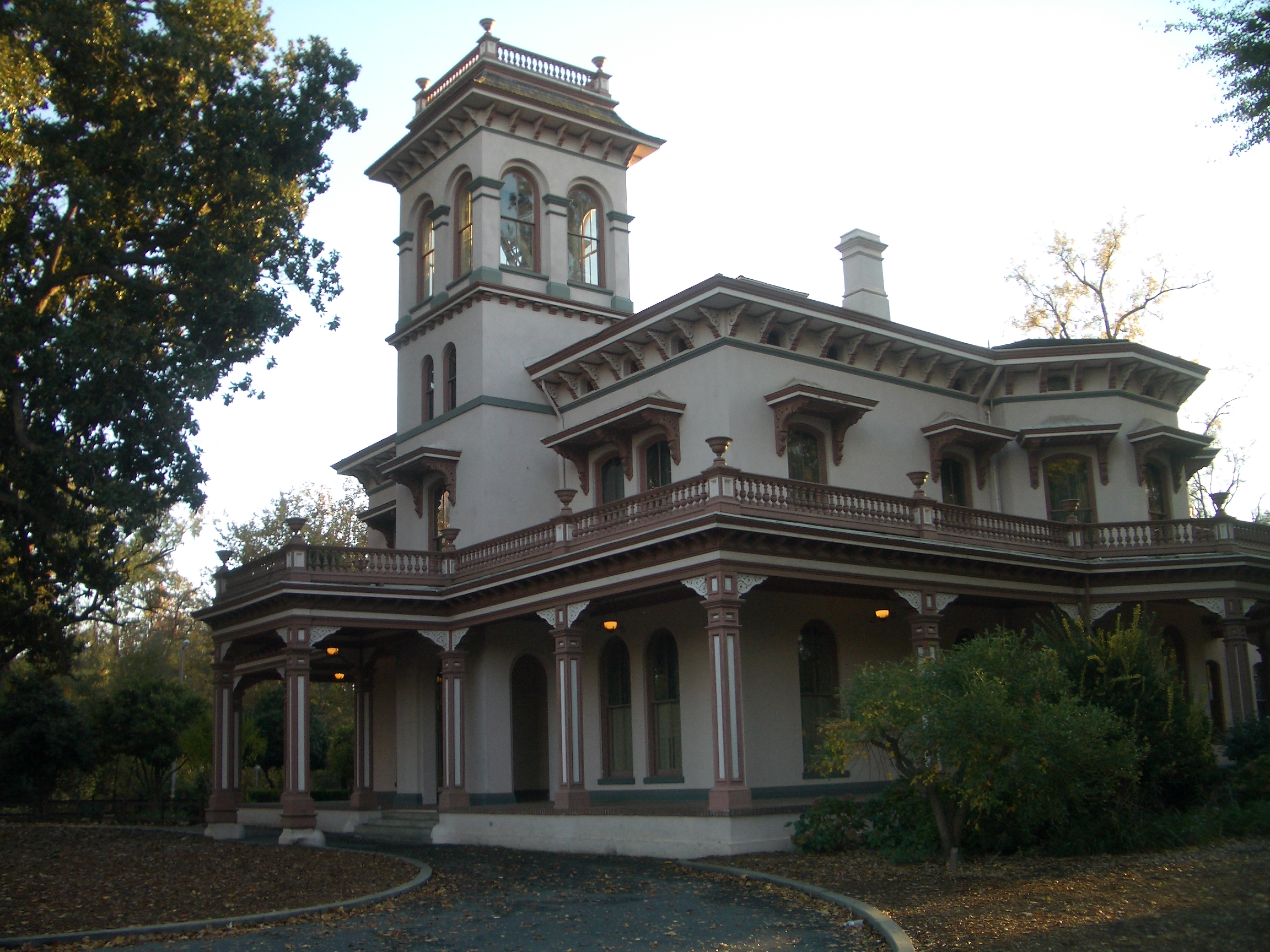
The Bidwell Mansion, built in 1865, Chico, California

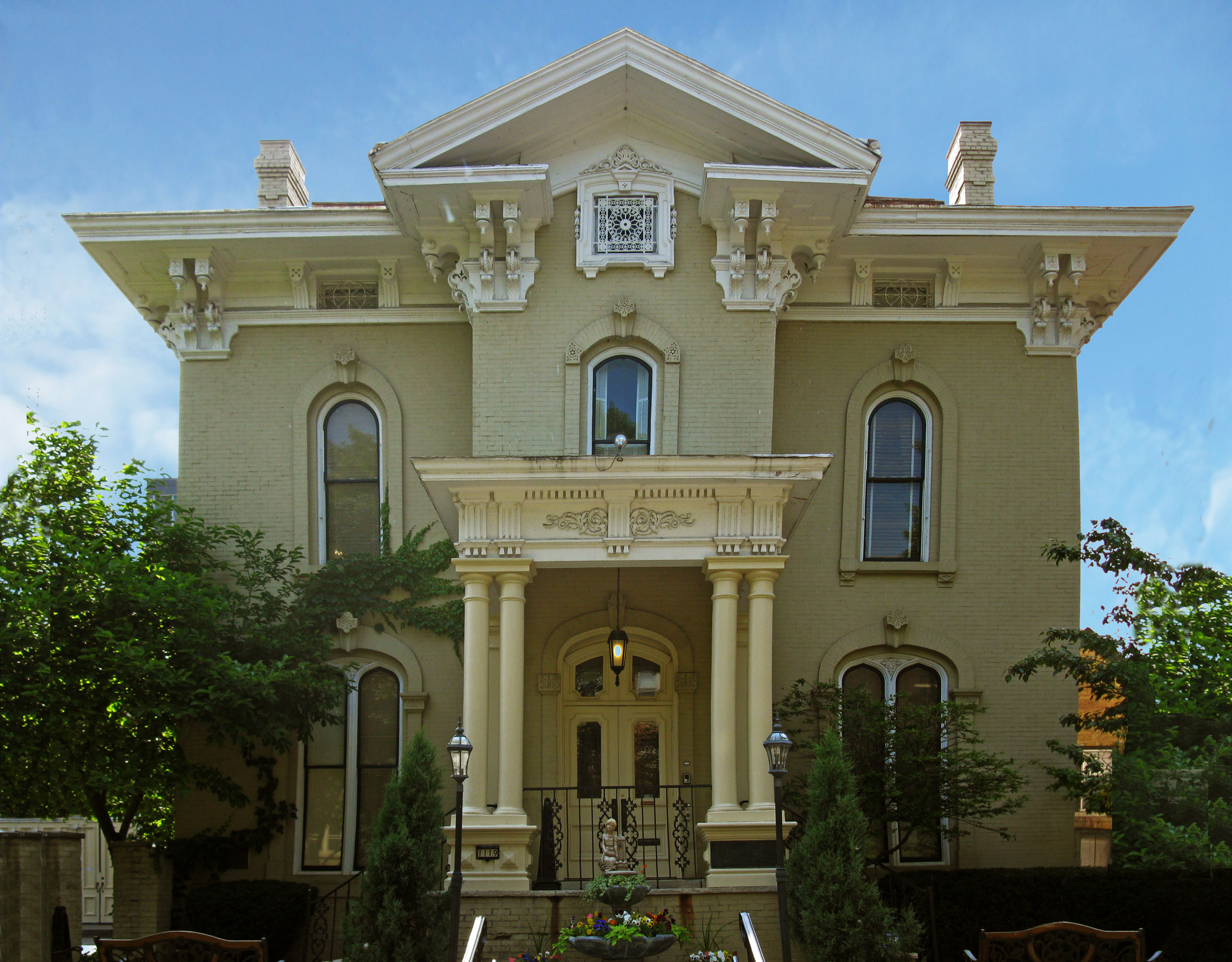
Robert Patrick Fitzgerald House, Milwaukee, 1876: potpourri of "Italianate" features

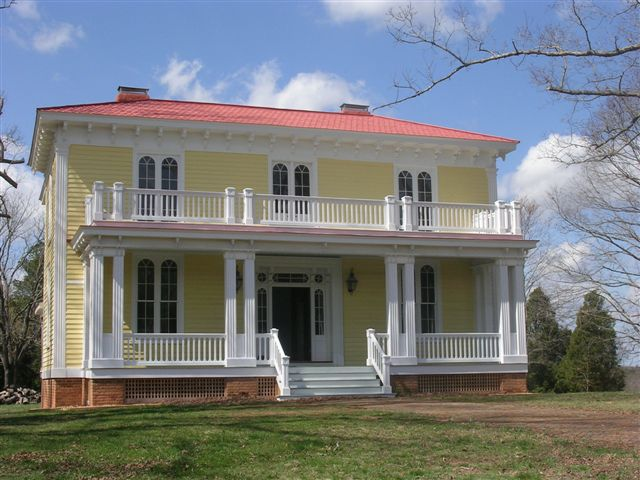
Annefield, Charlotte County, Virginia, built in 1858

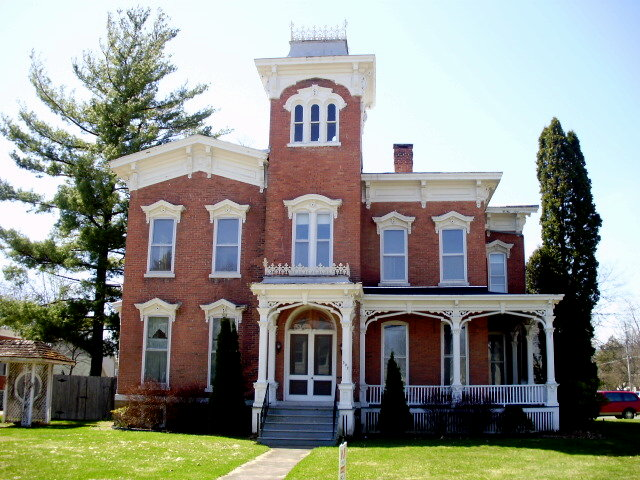
The Farnam Mansion in Oneida, New York, built in 1862

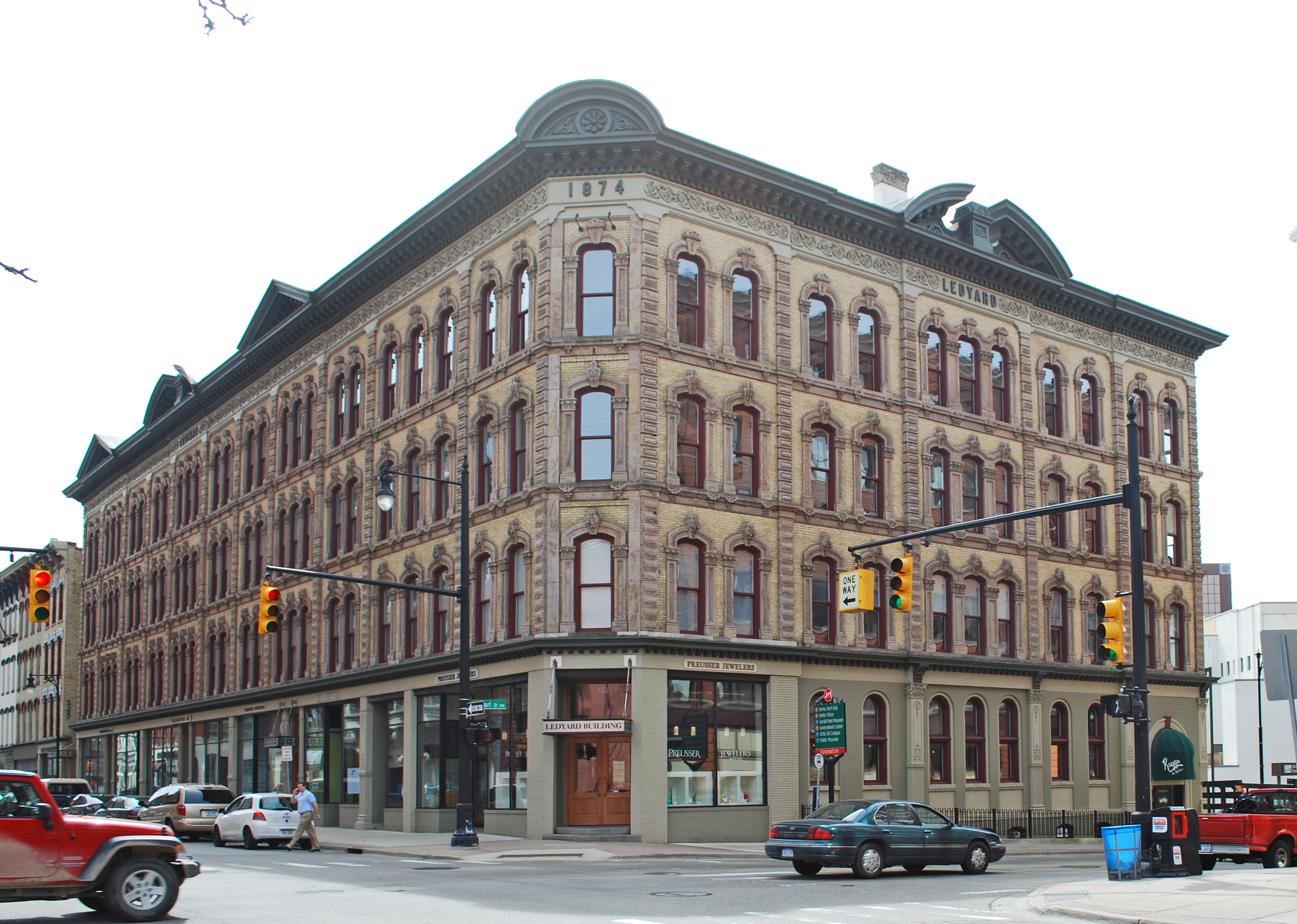
Ledyard Block Historic District, seven interconnected Italianate buildings in downtown Grand Rapids, Michigan, constructed between 1859 and 1874

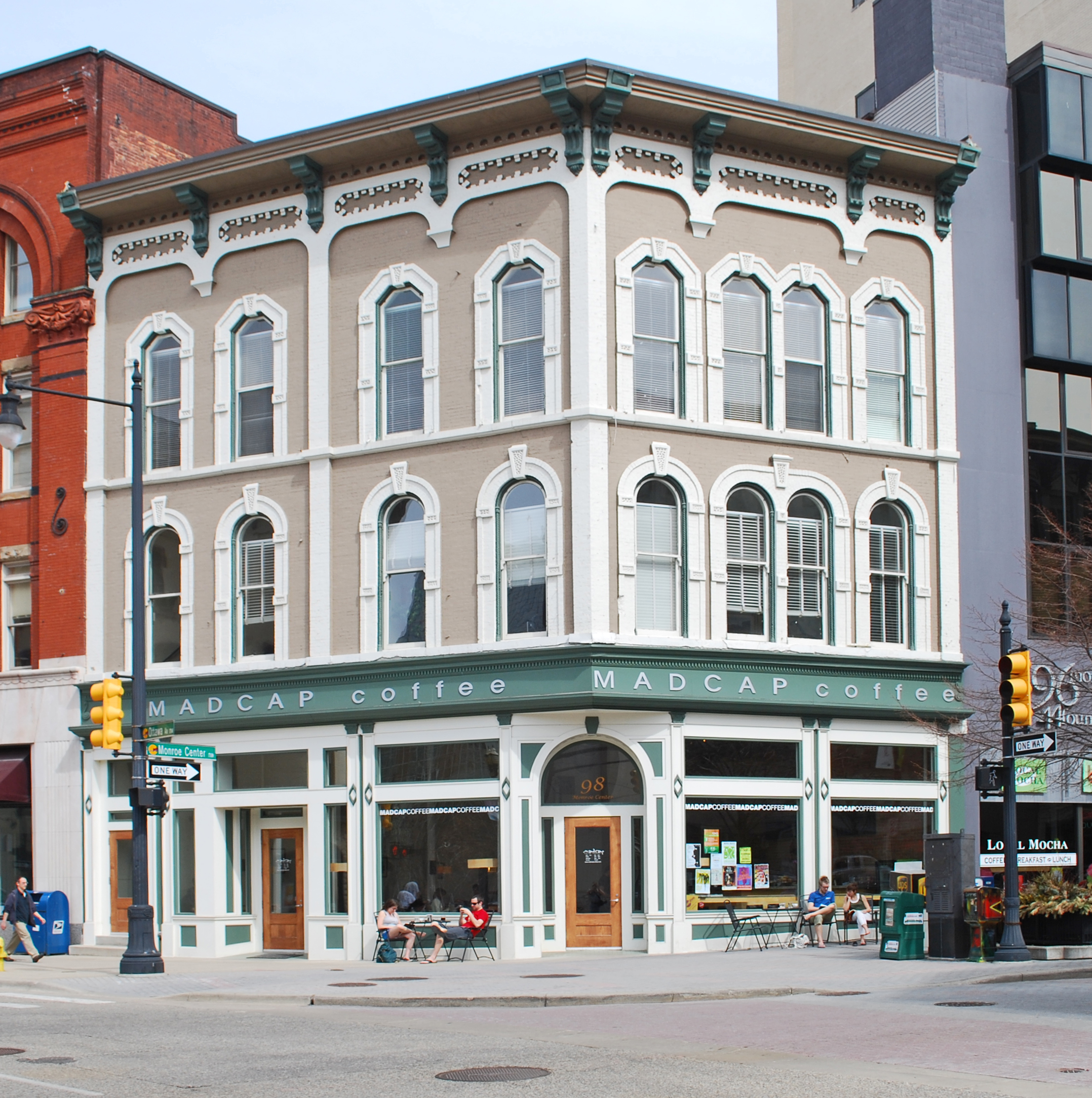
Aldrich Building, Grand Rapids, Michigan, built in 1869

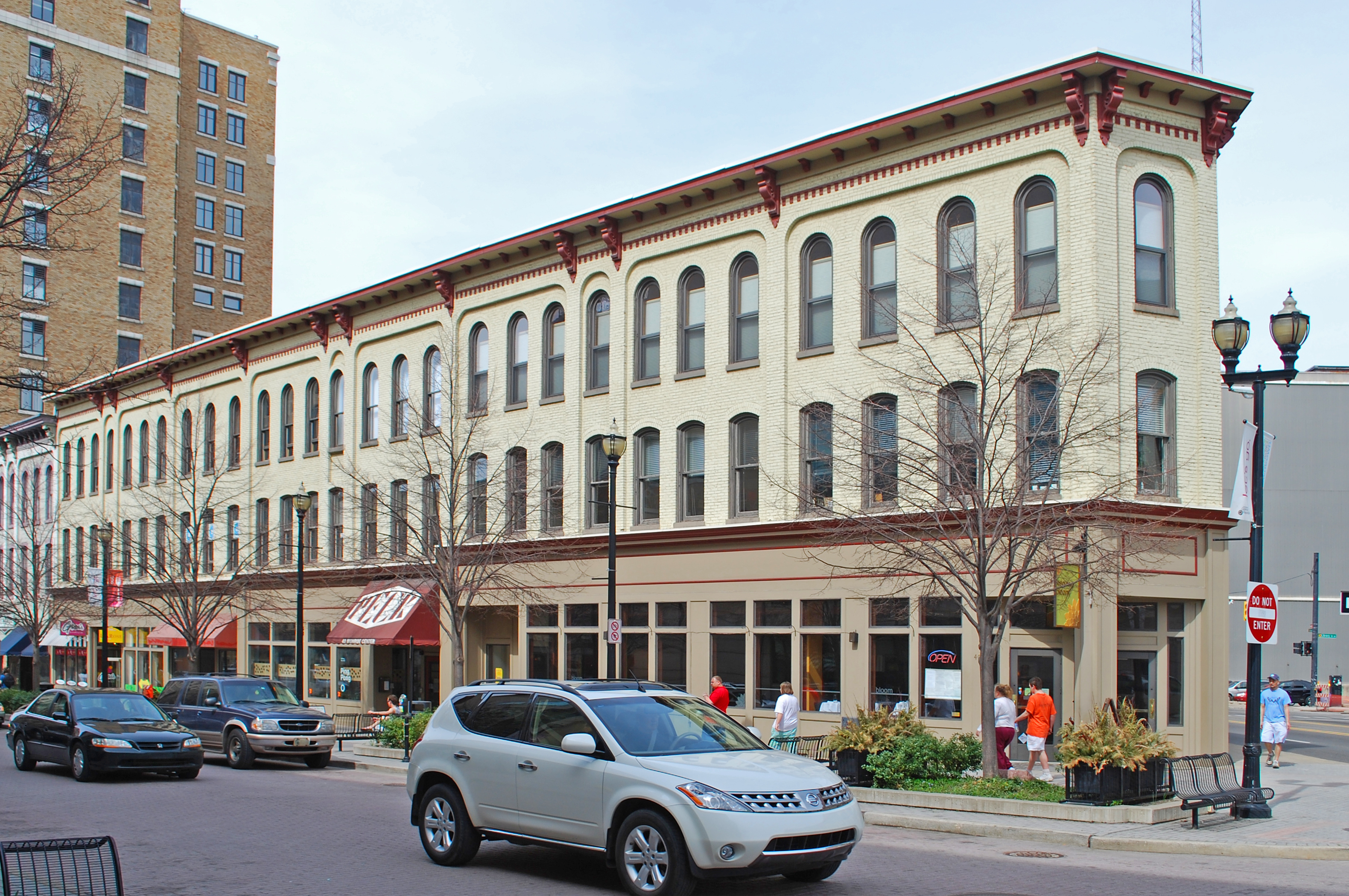
Peck Block, Grand Rapids, Michigan, built in 1875

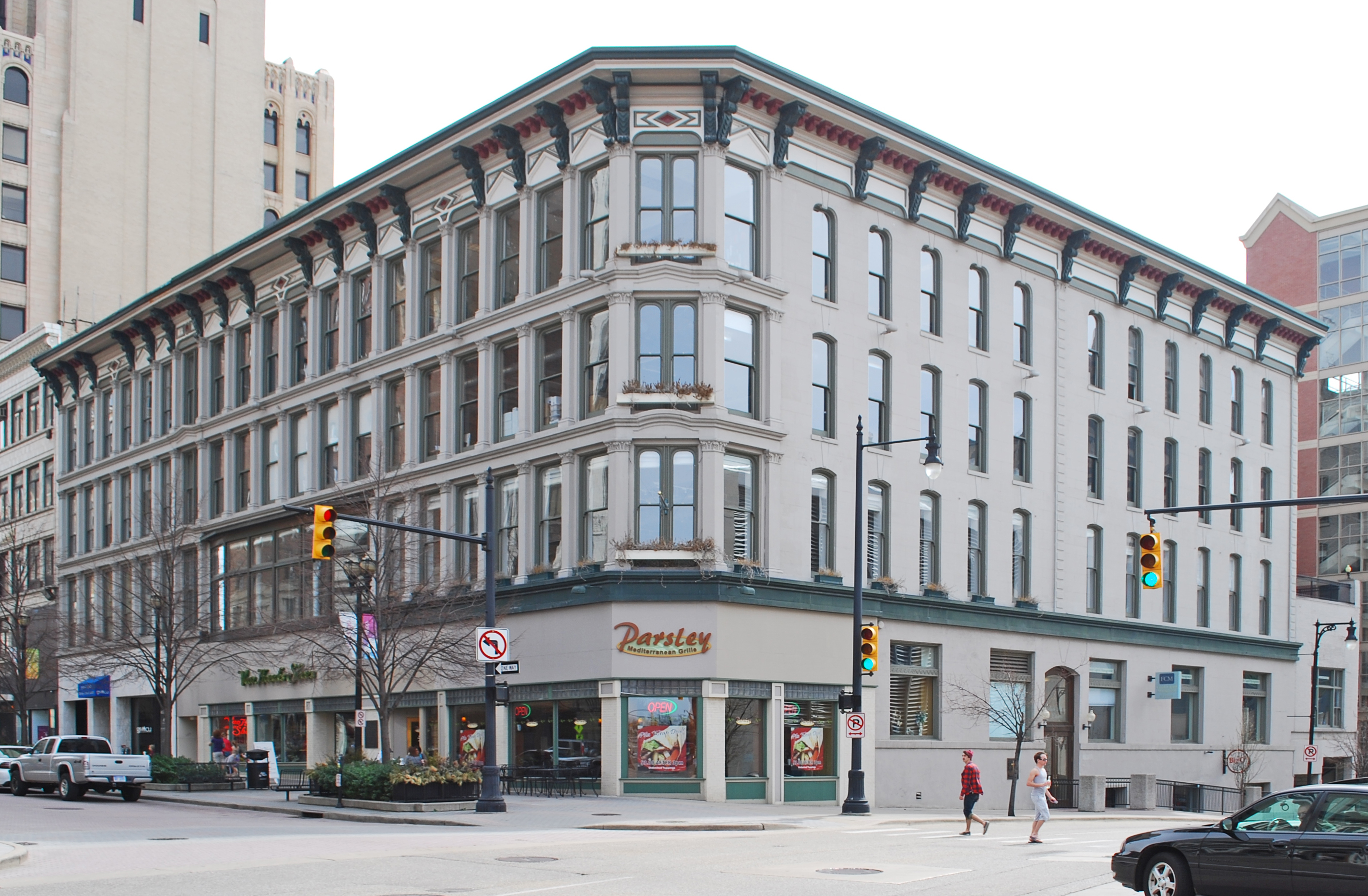
Aldrich Godfrey and White Block, Grand Rapids, Michigan, built in 1874

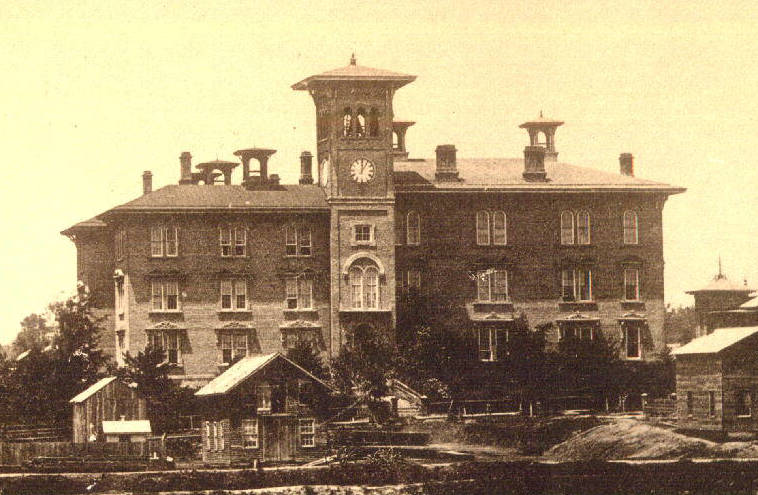
Toledo Central High School in Toledo, Ohio, 1864

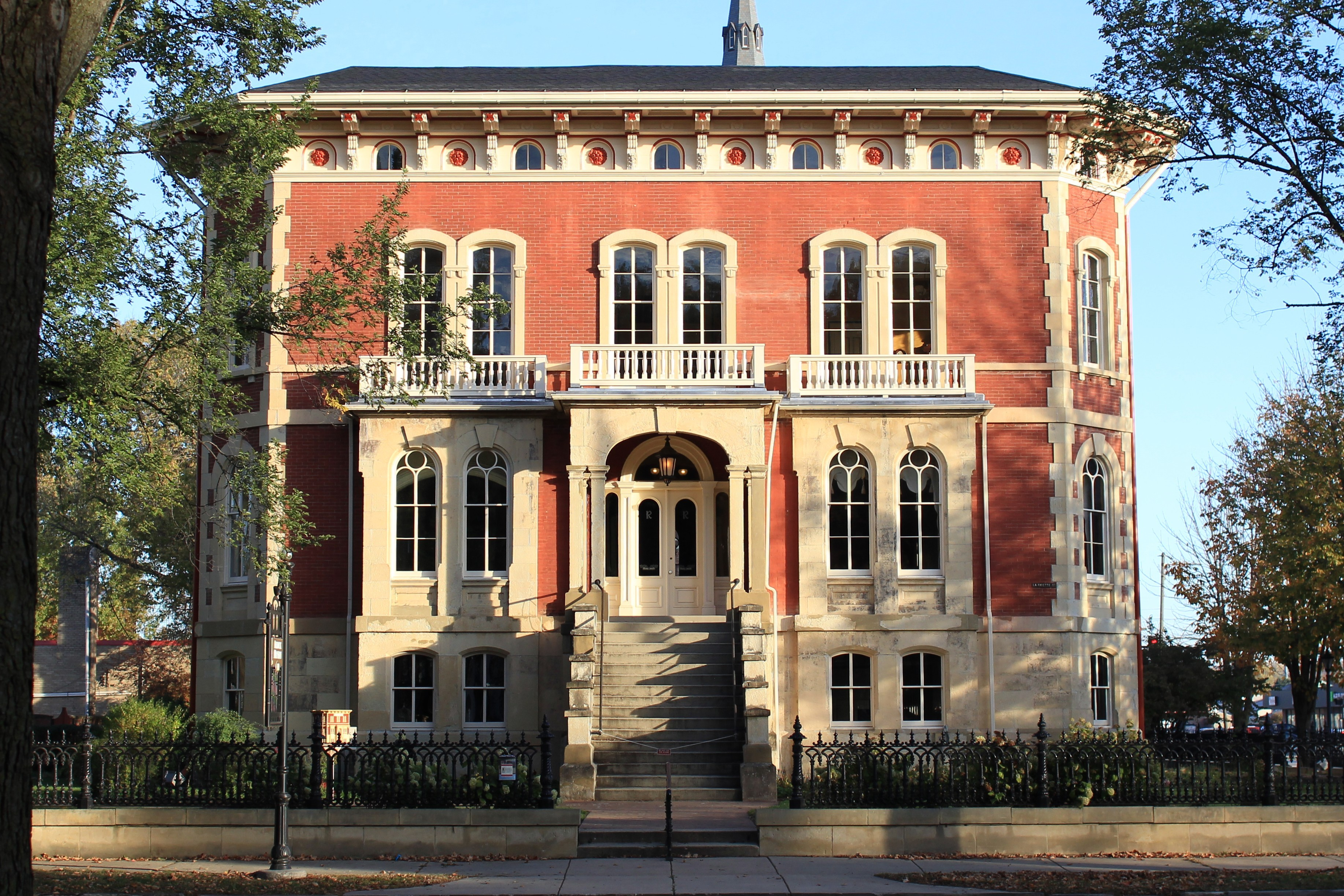
William Reddick Mansion in Ottawa, Illinois, built in 1855

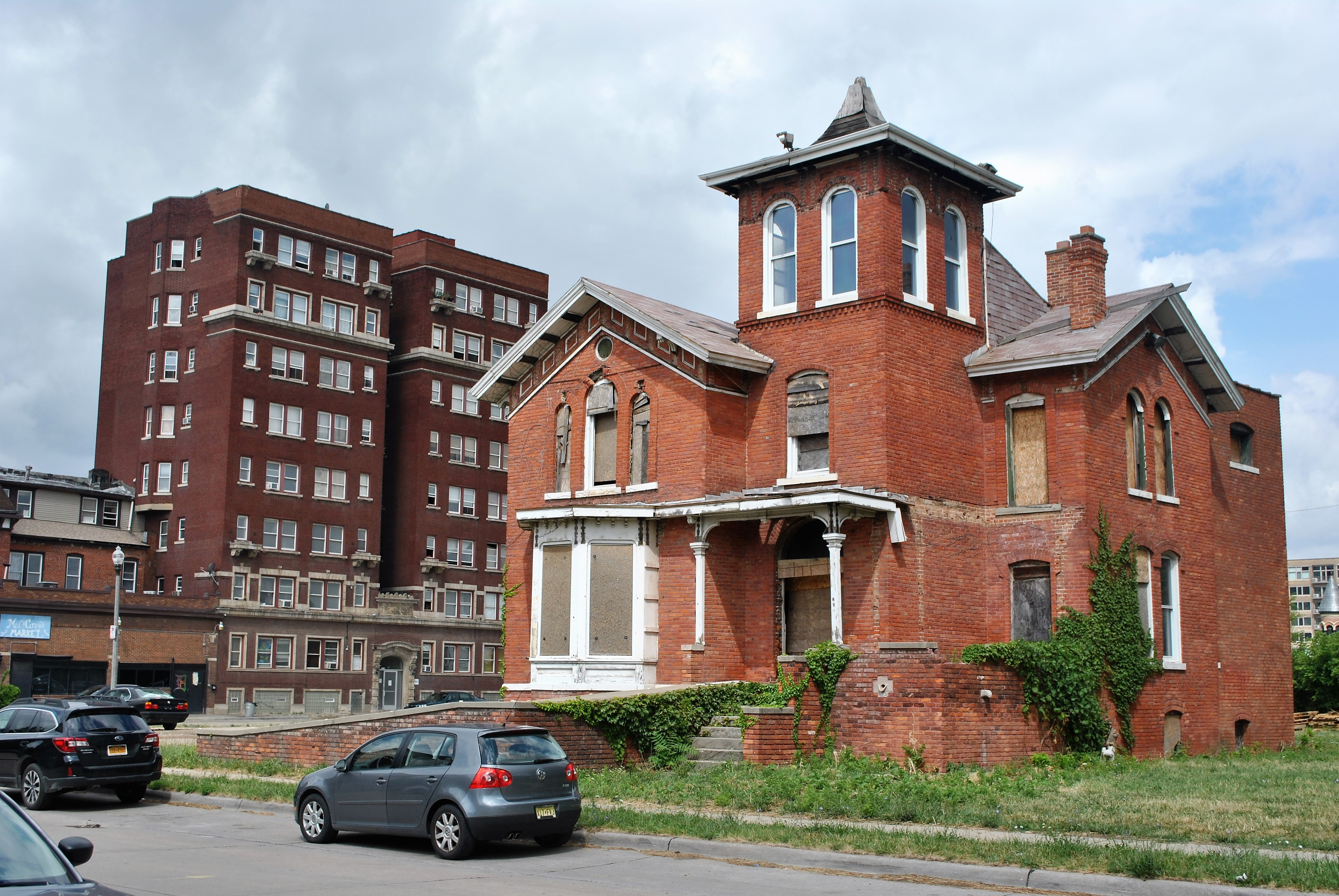
Horace S. Tarbell House, Detroit, Michigan, built in 1869

=== Argentina ===
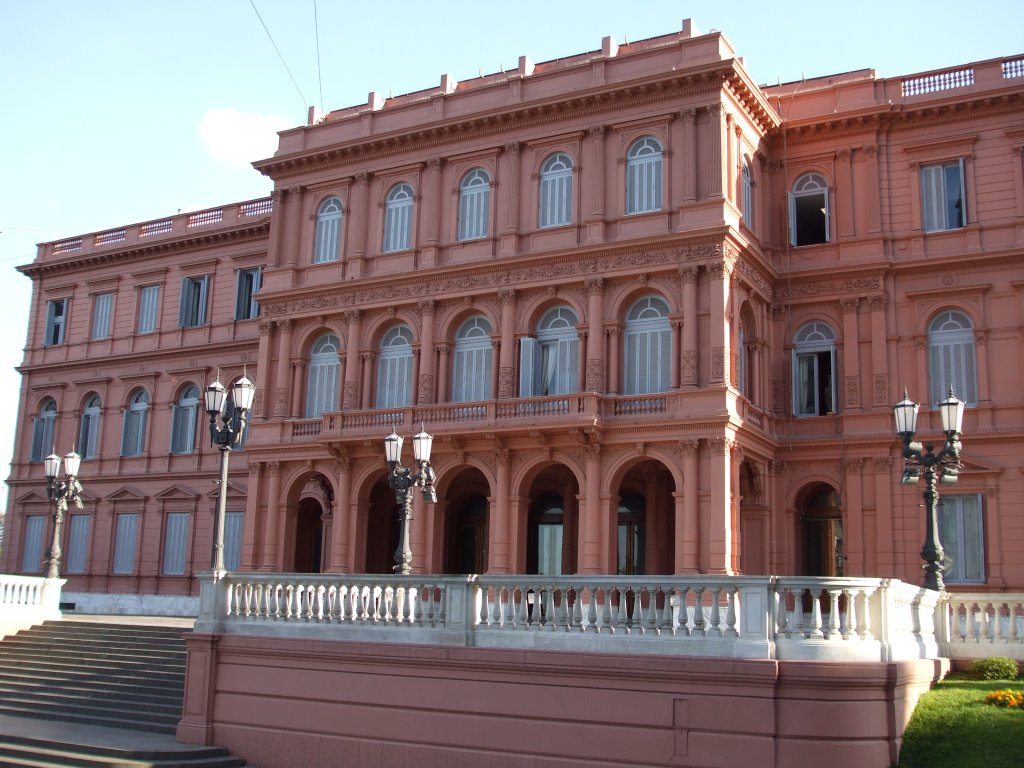
Casa Rosada (Presidential Palace of Argentina in Buenos Aires)

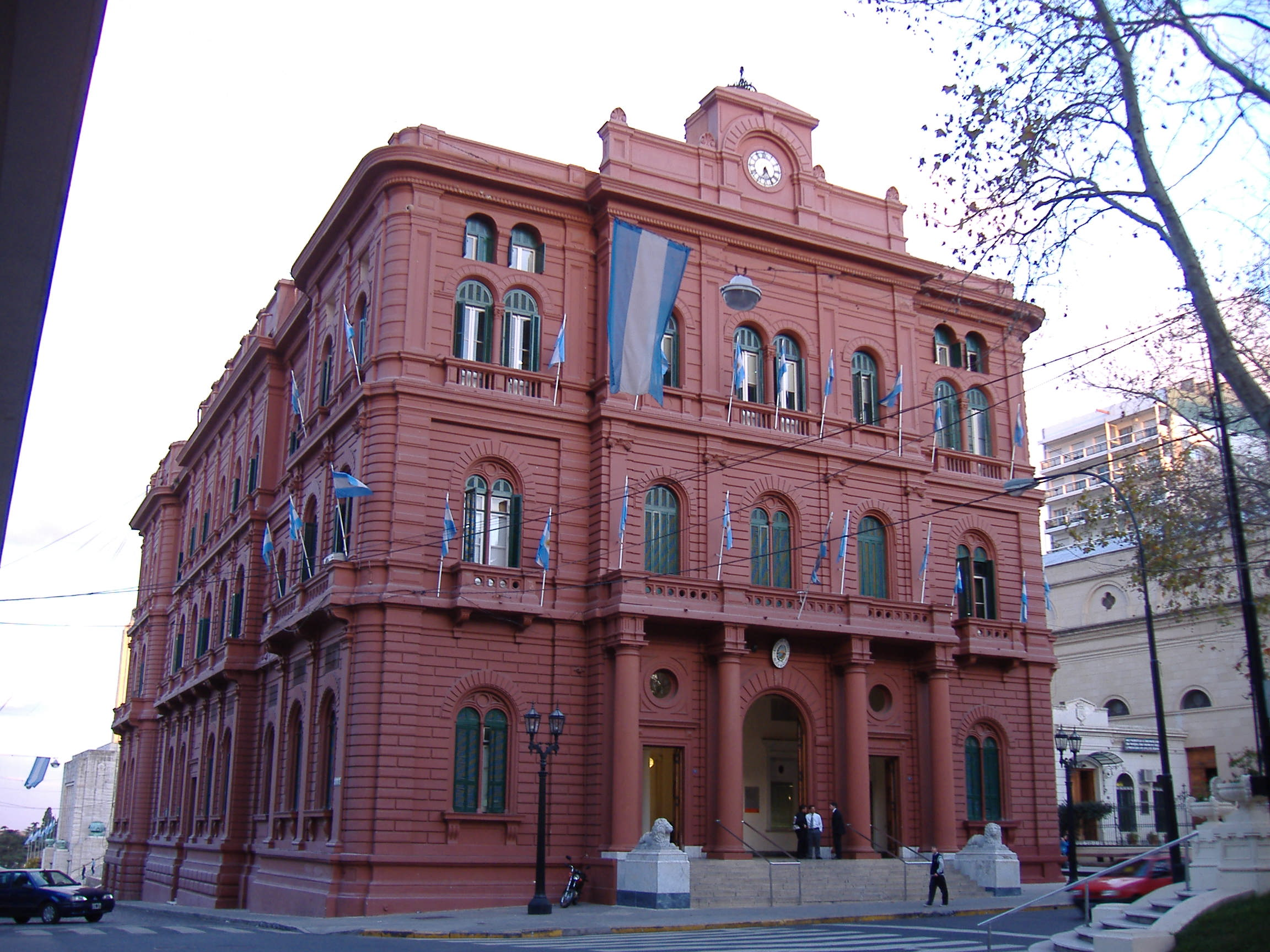
Palacio de los Leones (Municipal Palace of Rosario)

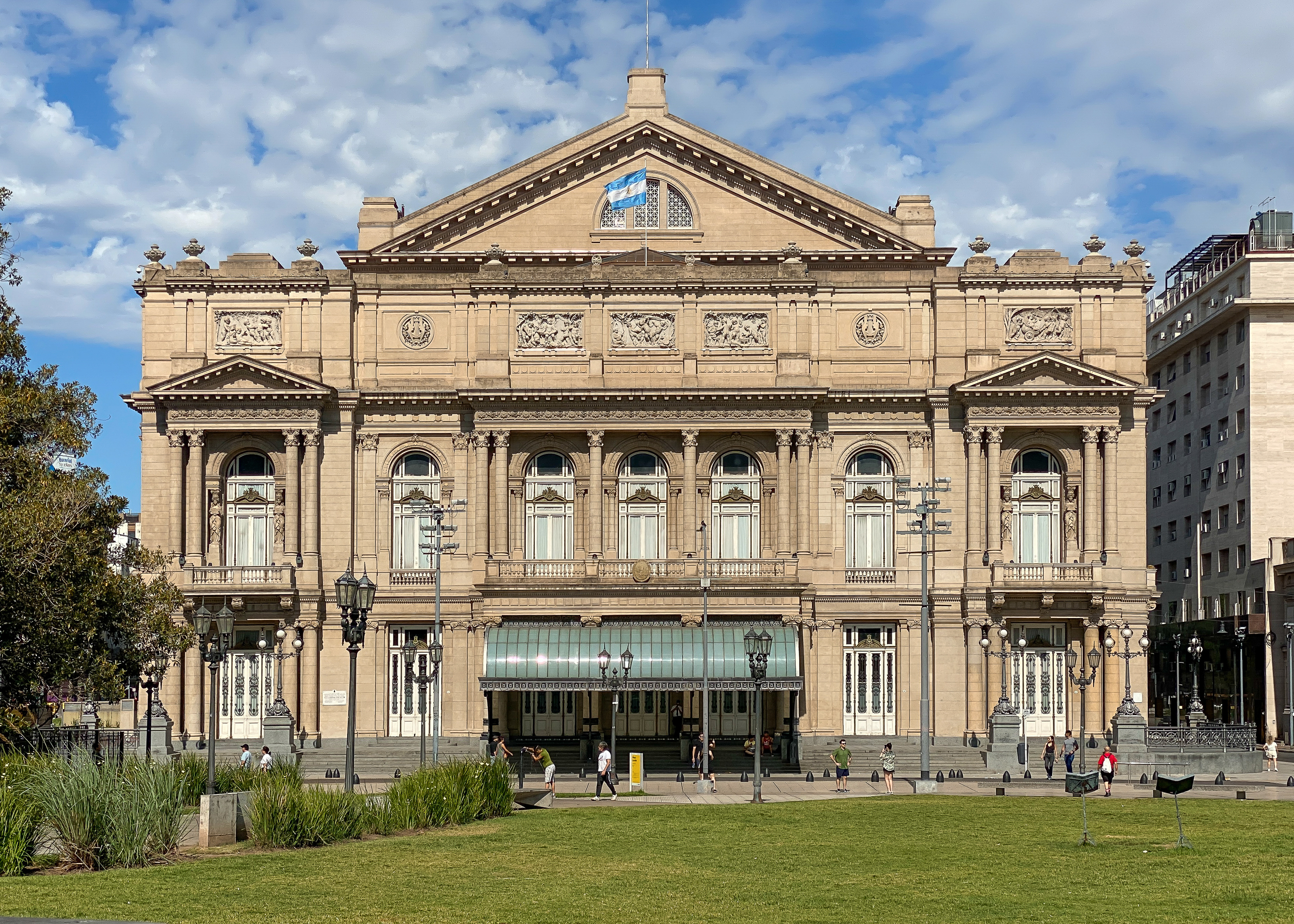
Teatro Colón (Opera house in Buenos Aires)

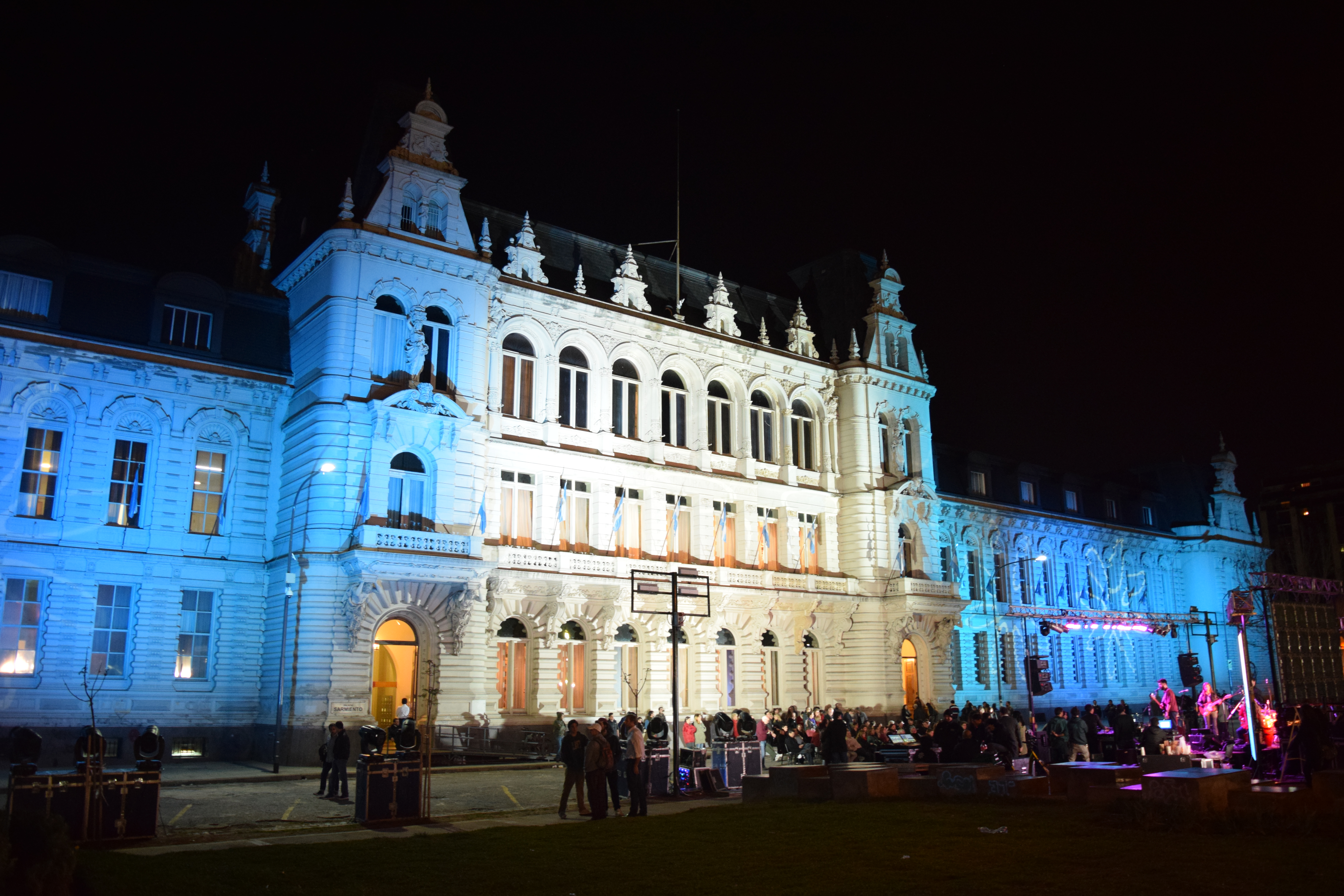
Palacio Pizzurno (Secretariat of Education)

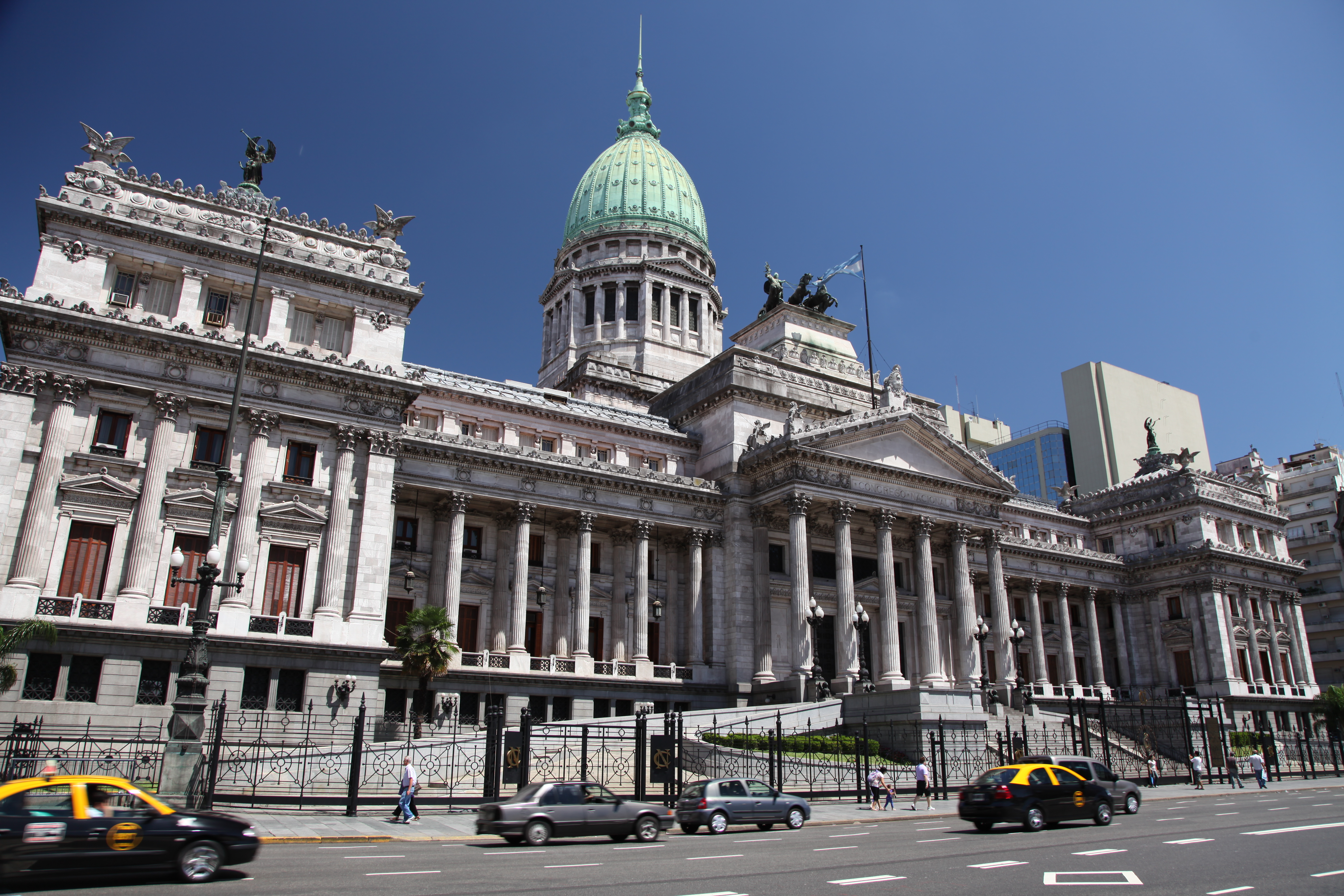
Palace of the Argentine National Congress

=== Australia and New Zealand ===
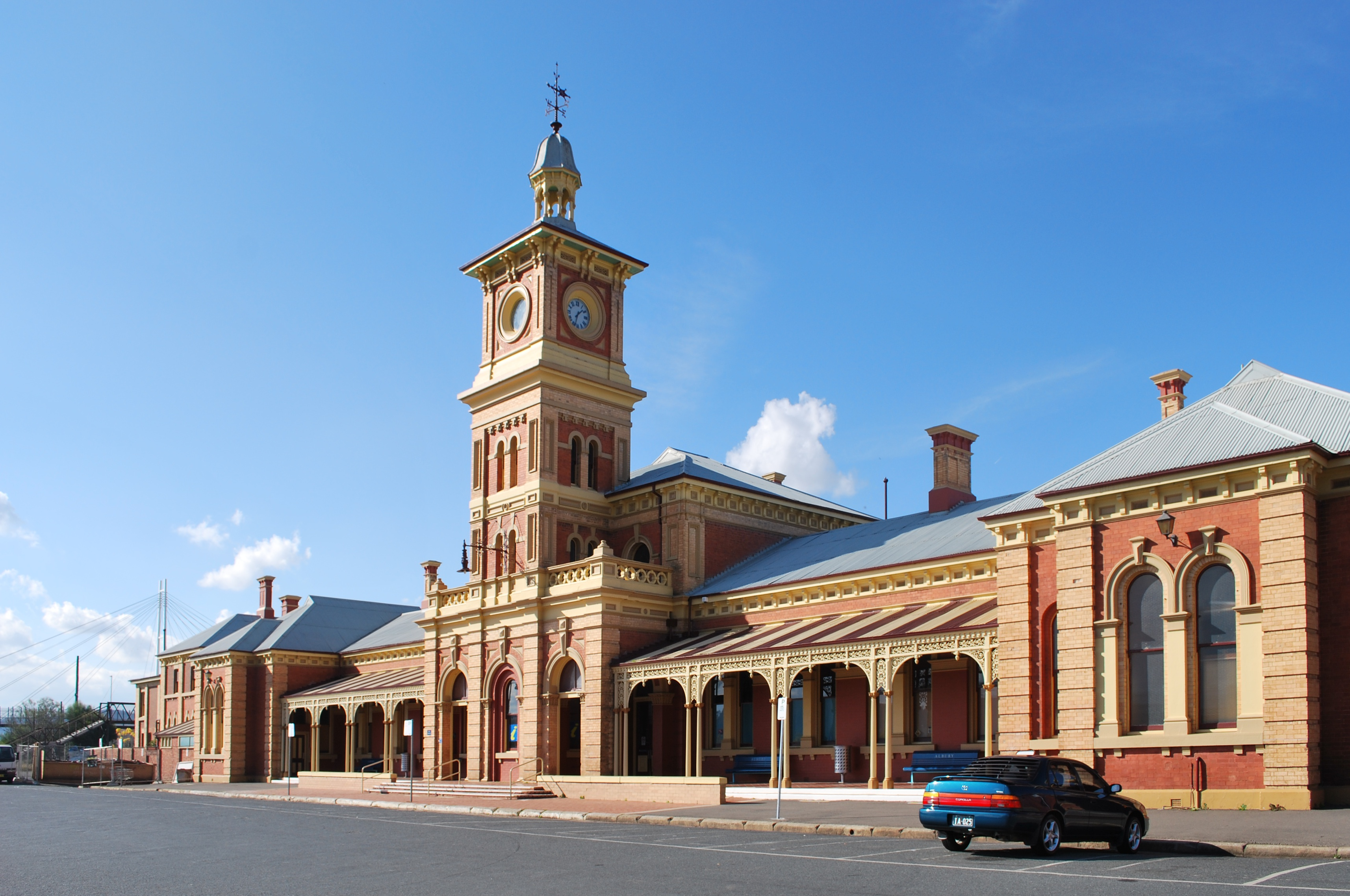
Railway station of Albury, New South Wales, Australia (1881)

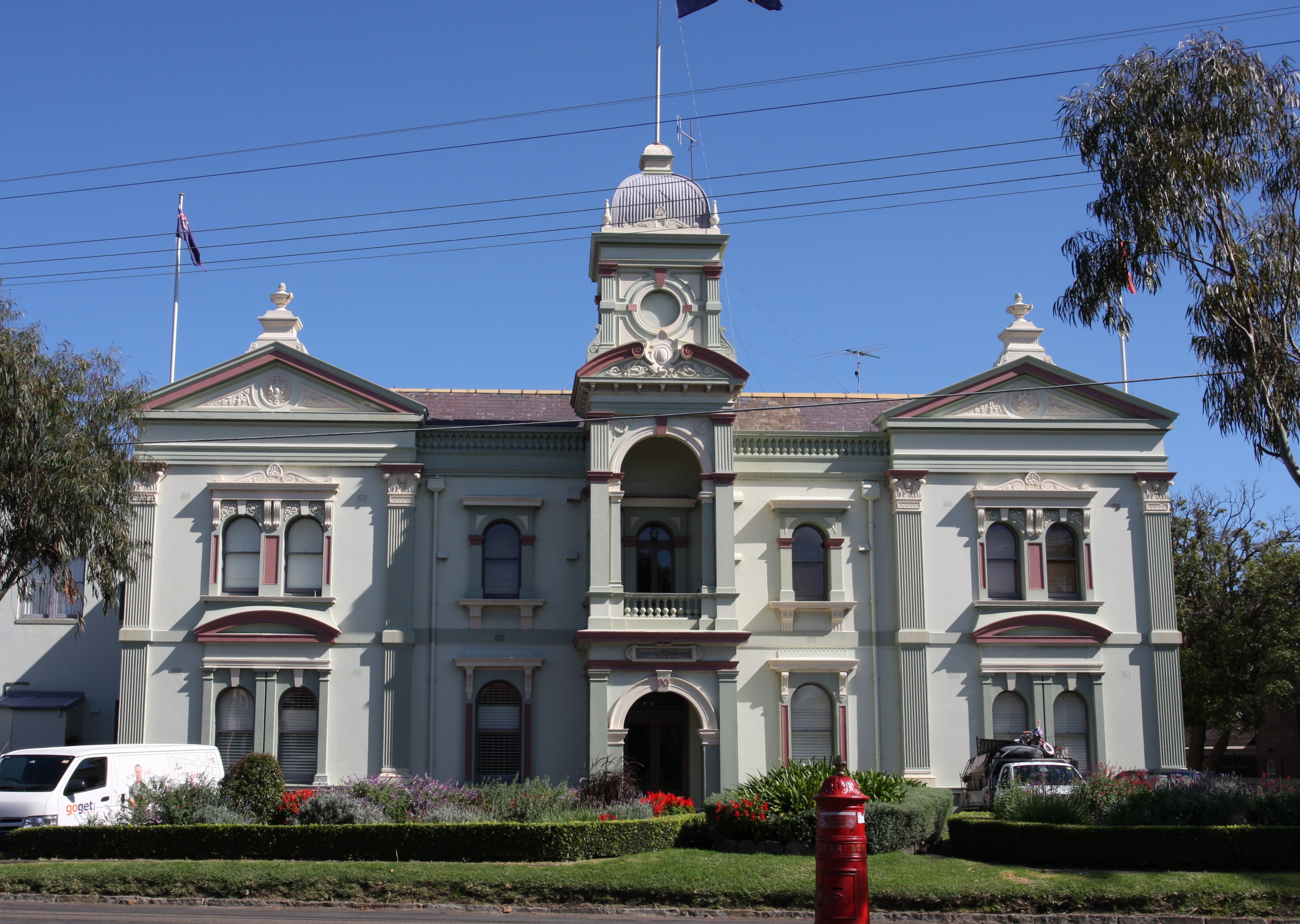
Randwick Town Hall, New South Wales

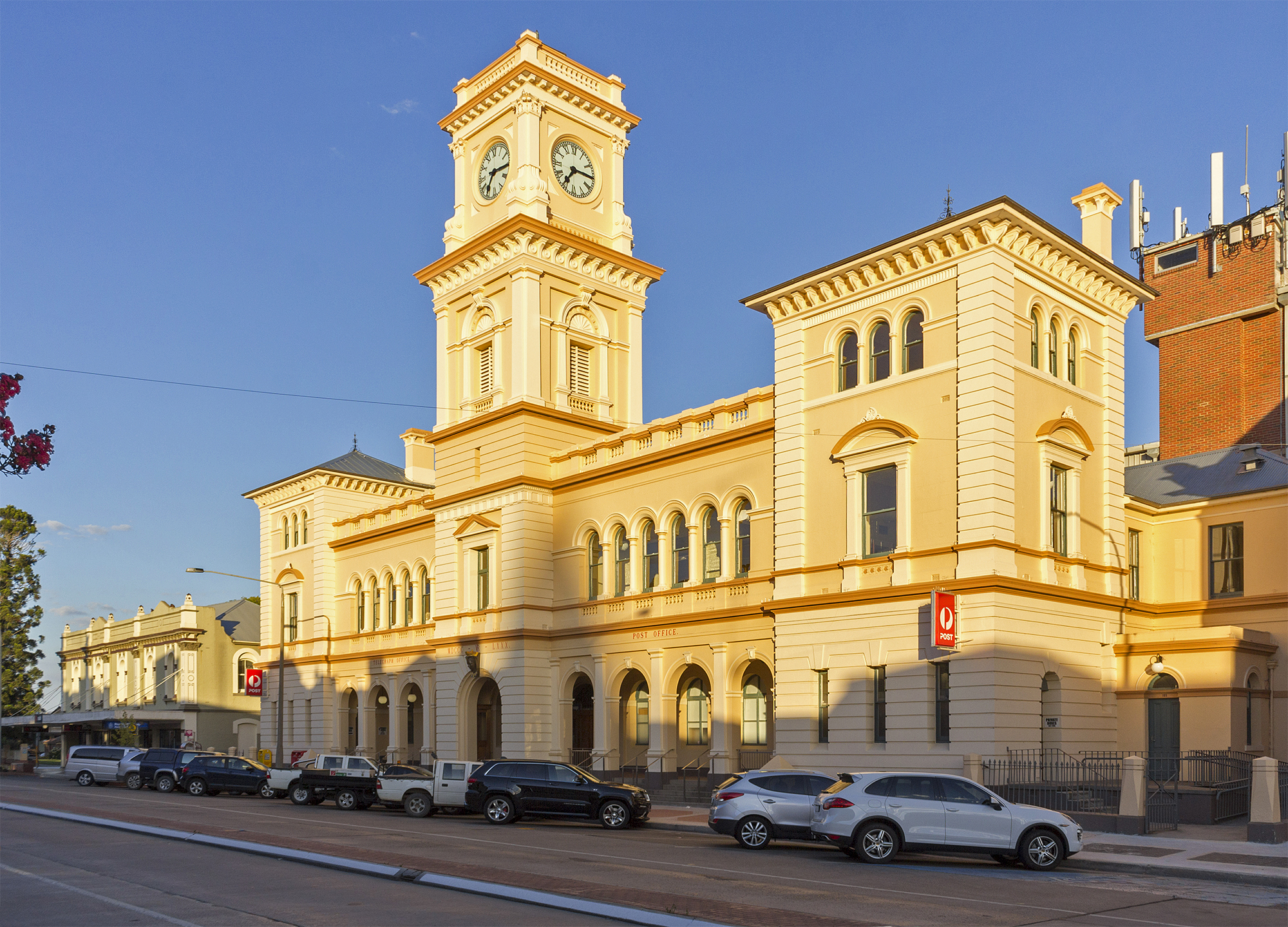
Goulburn Post Office, New South Wales

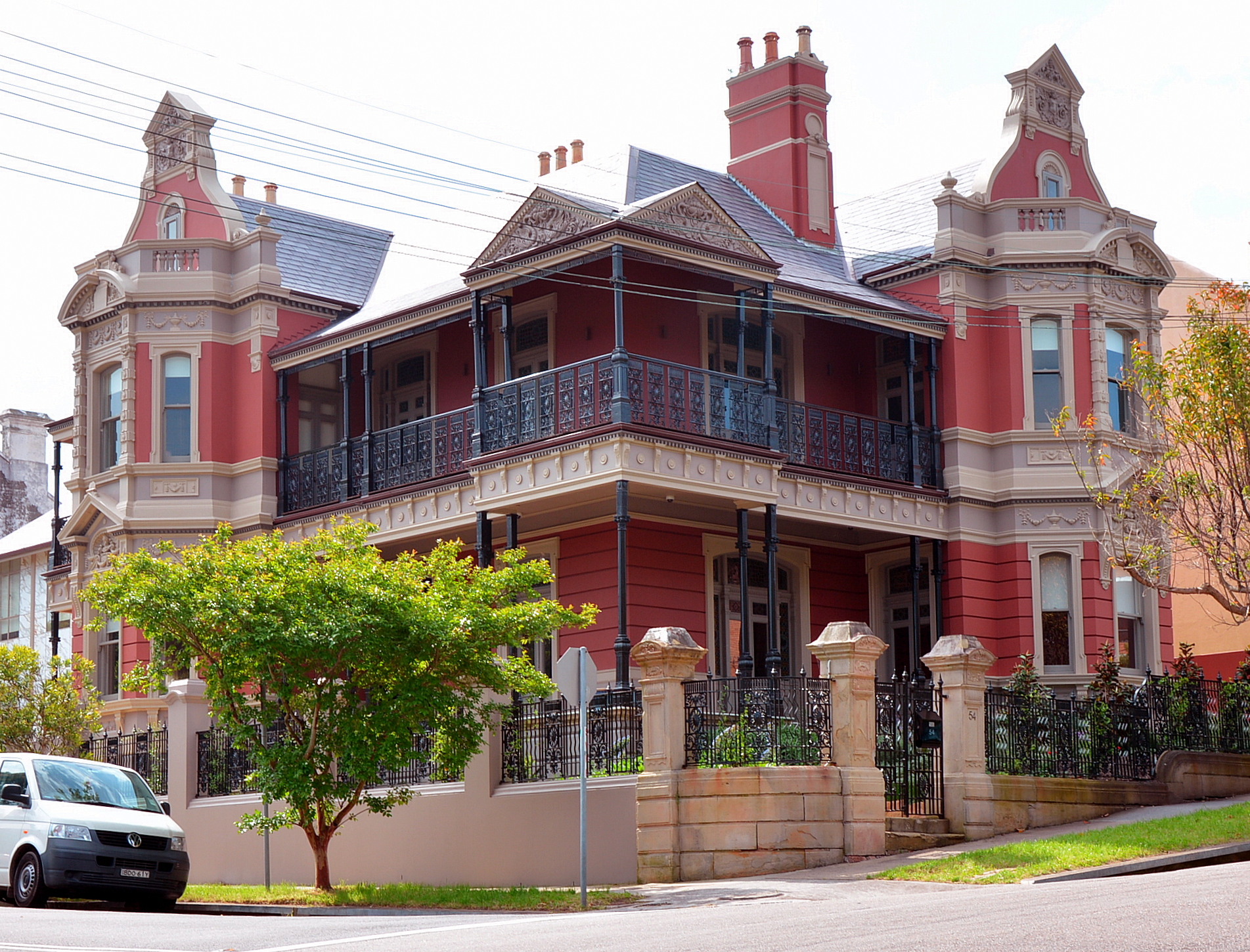
Italianate house in Randwick, New South Wales

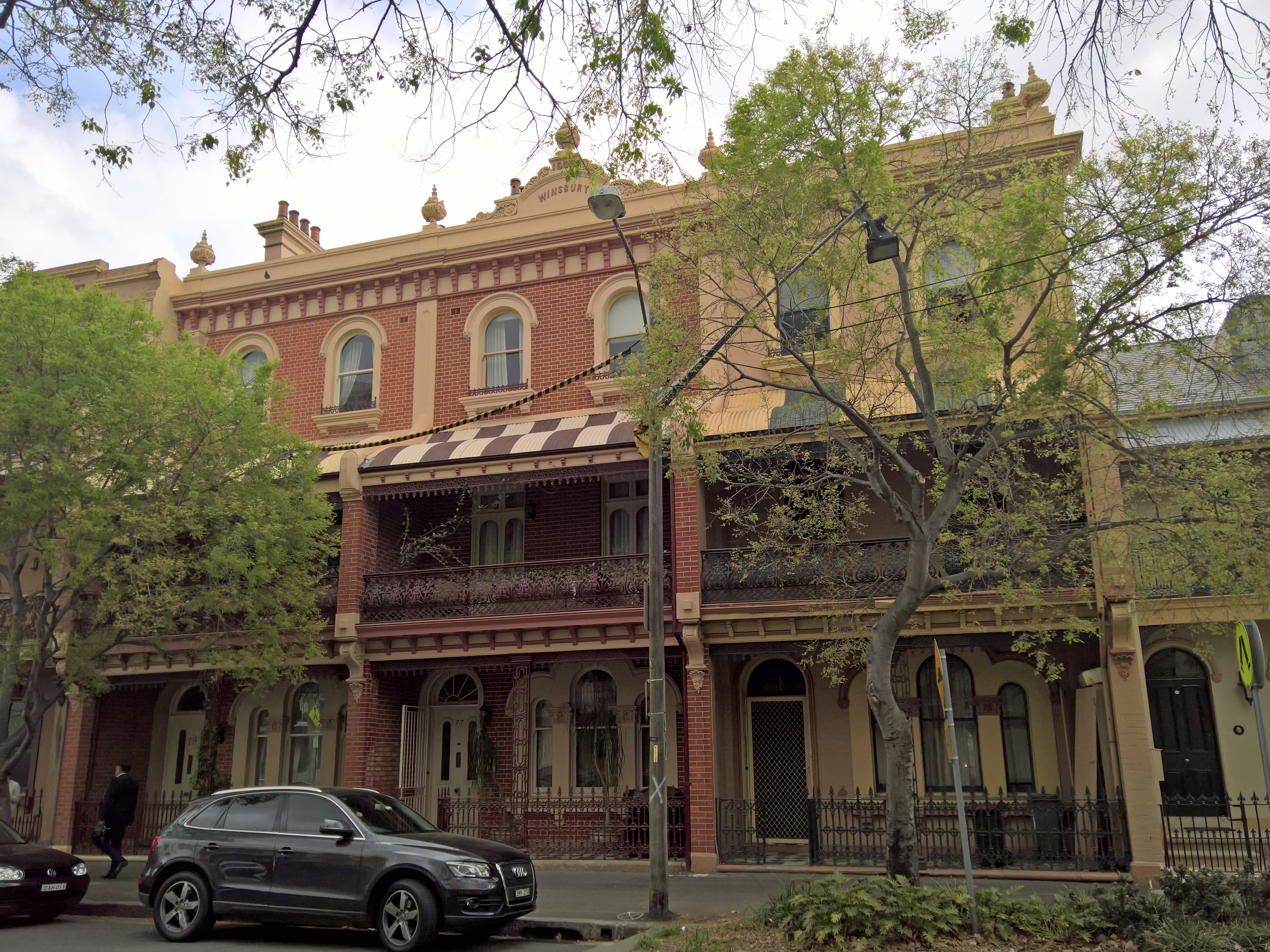
Italianate terraces in Millers Point, Sydney

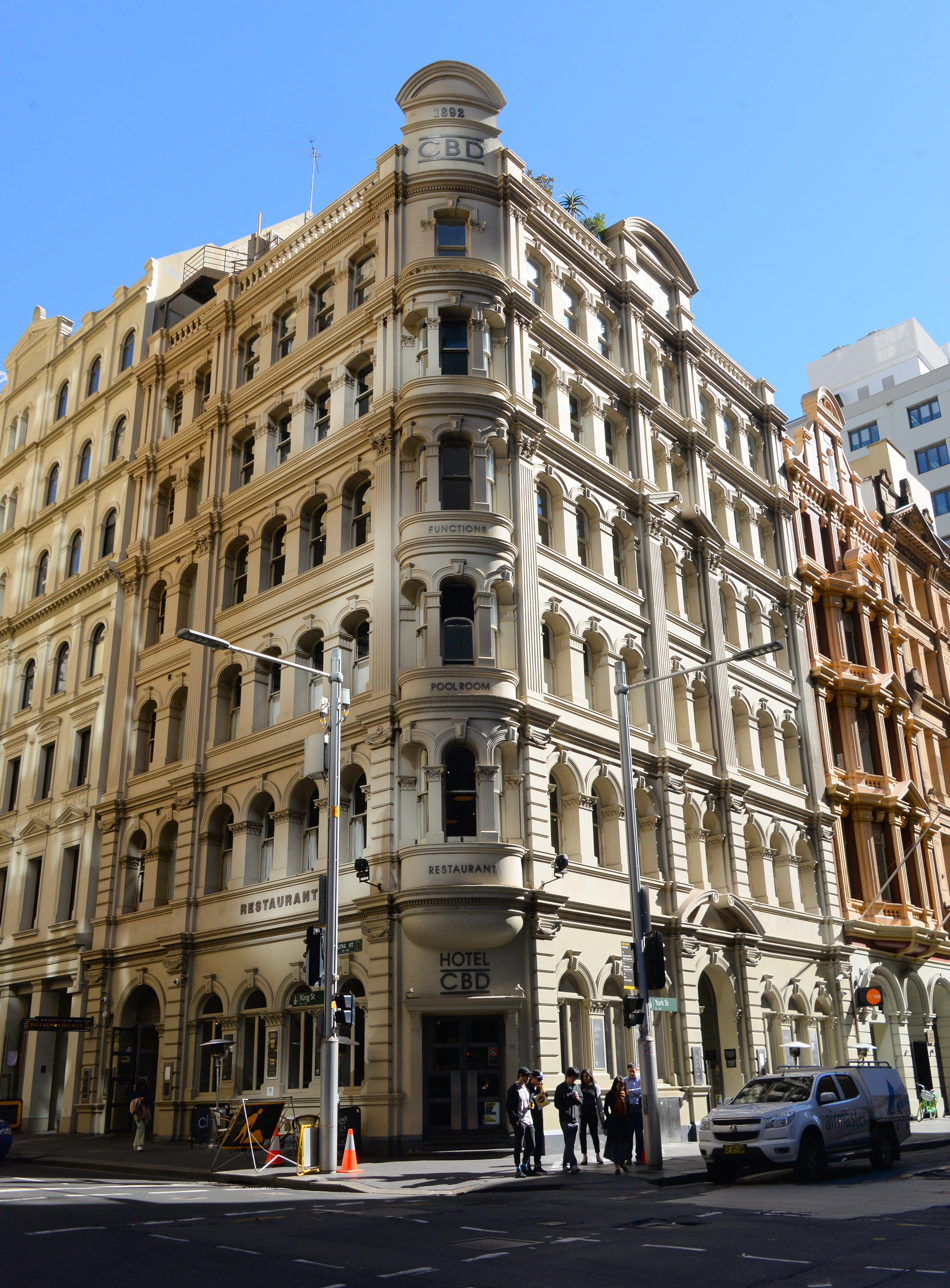
Former National House, Sydney

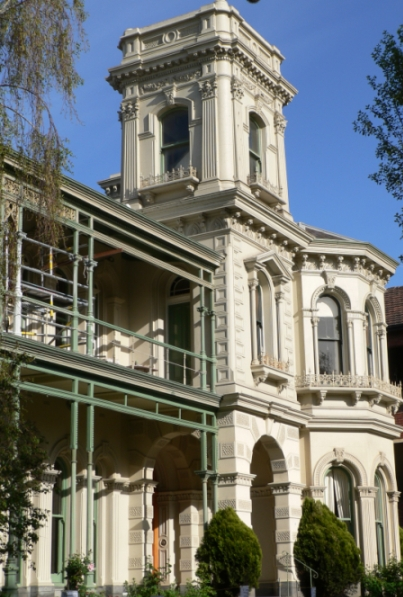
Myrnong Hall, Acland Street, St Kilda, Victoria, Melbourne

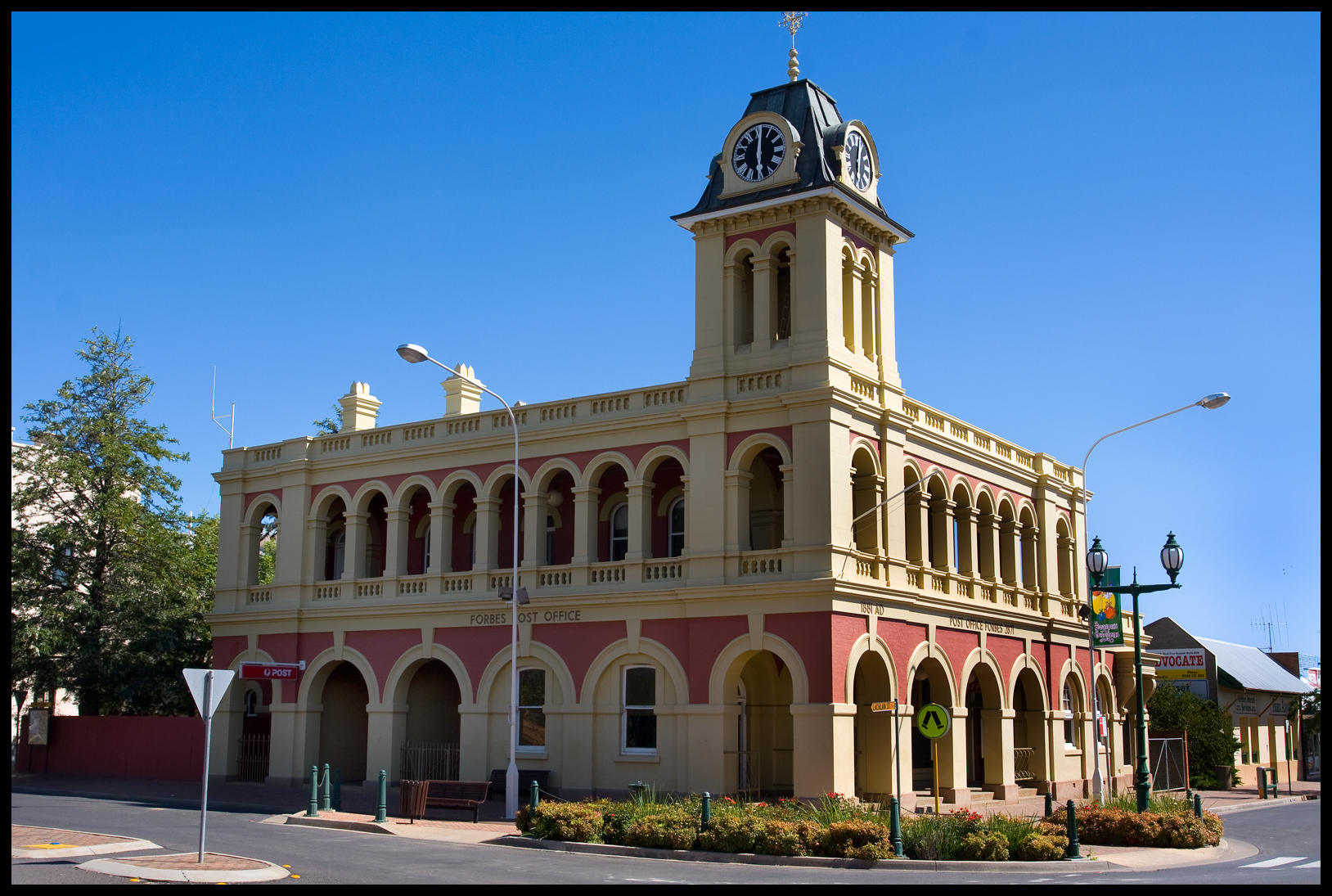
Forbes Post Office

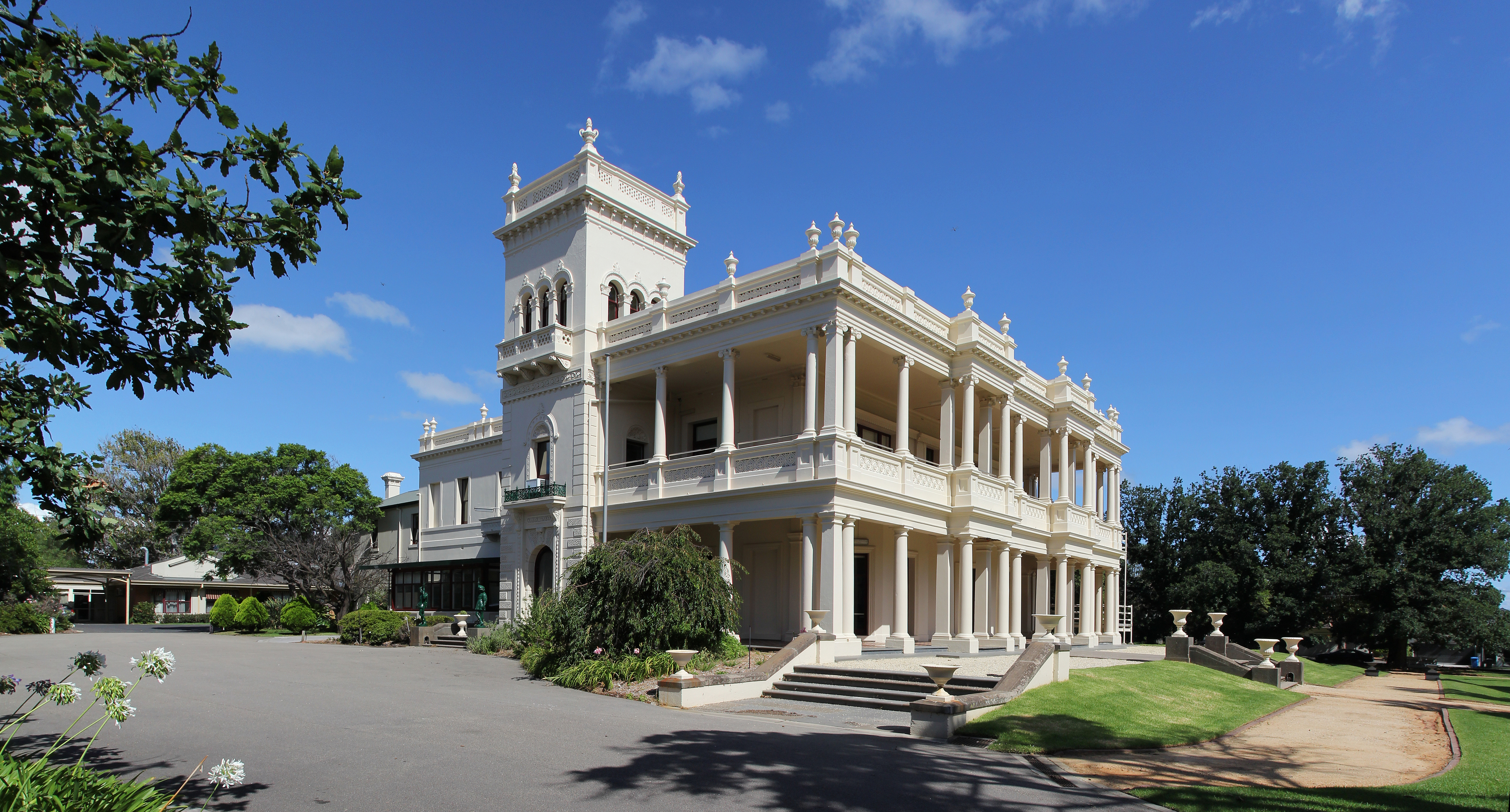
Kamesburgh, North Road, Brighton, Victoria

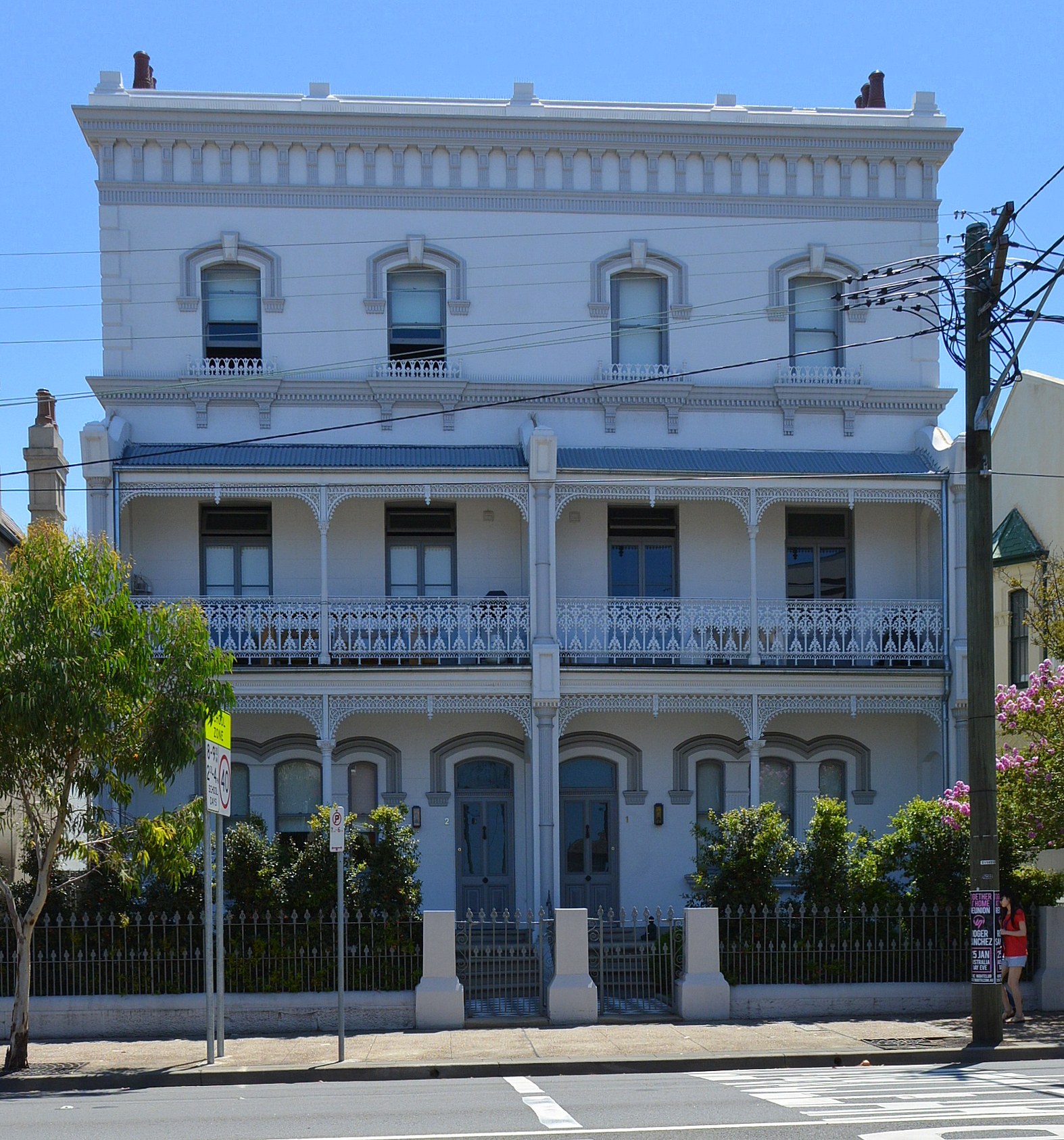
Italianate terraces, Randwick, New South Wales

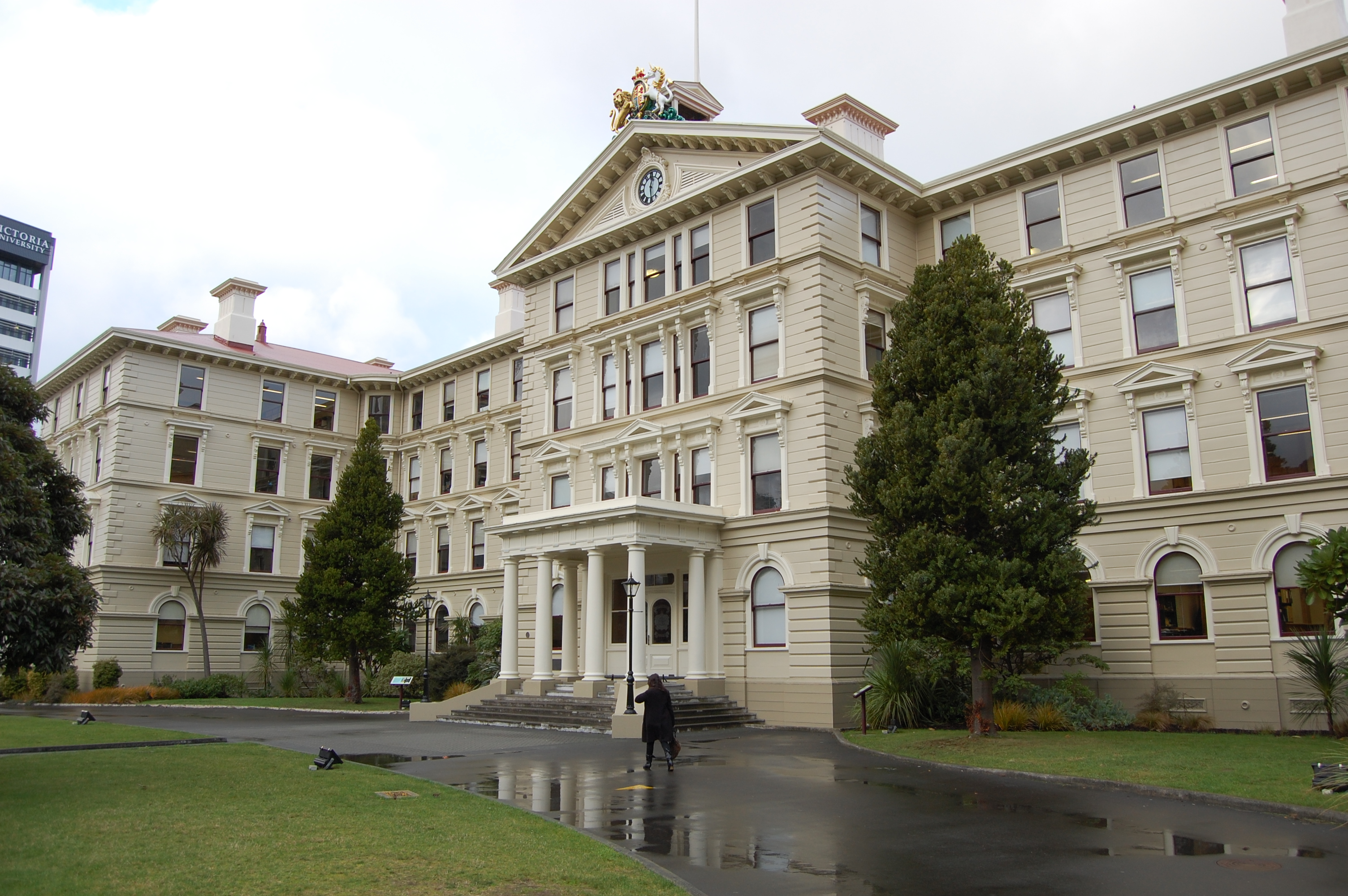
Old Government Buildings, Wellington

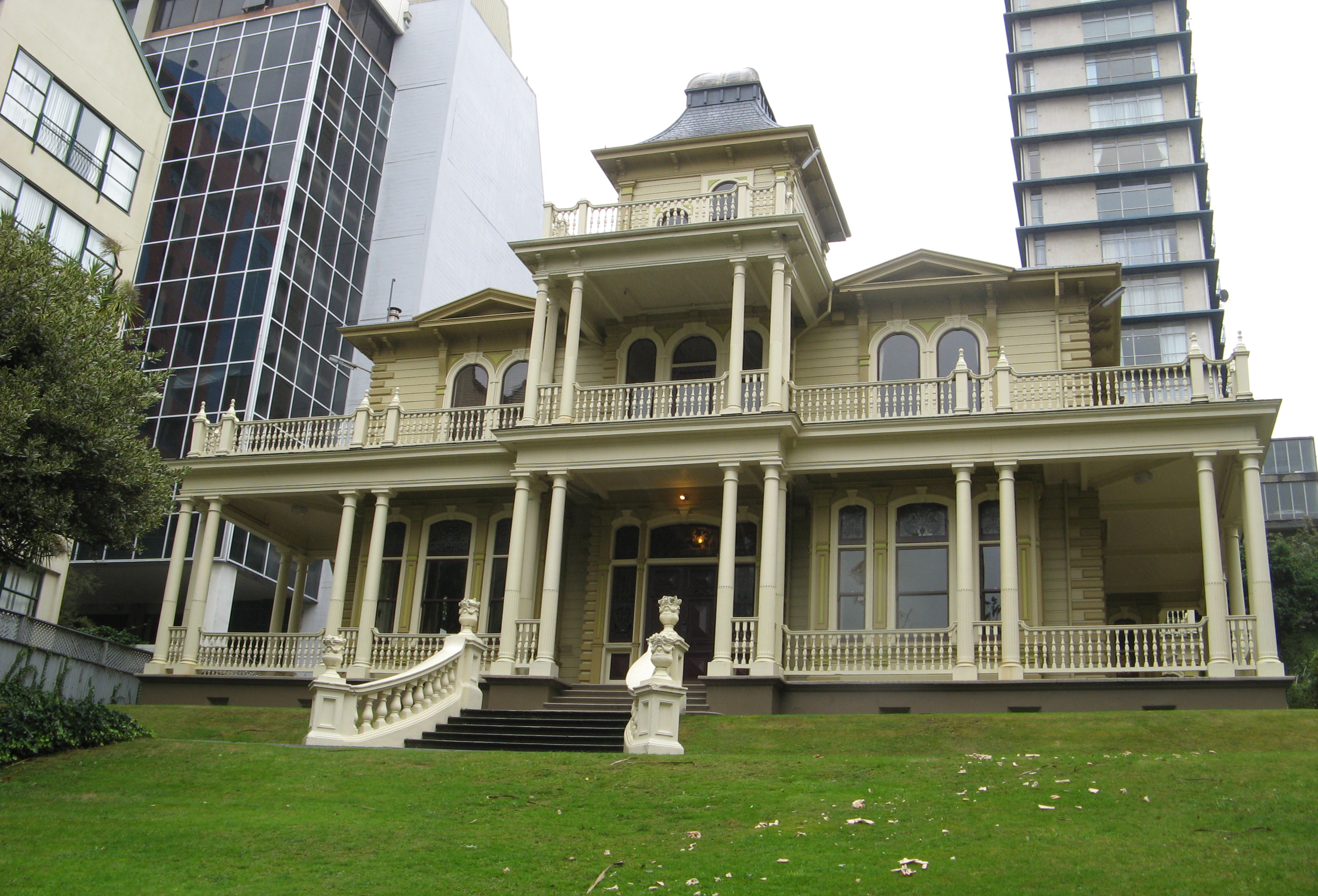
Antrim House, Wellington

== See also ==
- List of architectural styles
