= National Register of Historic Places listings in Kent County, Michigan =

Map of Michigan with Kent County highlighted

The following is a list of places listed in the National Register in Kent County, Michigan.

This National Park Service list is complete through NPS recent listings posted August 21, 2026.

== Current listings ==
	Name on the Register	Image	Date listed	Location	City or town	Description
1	Ada Covered Bridge	Ada Covered Bridge	February 16, 1970 (#70000275)	Across the Thornapple River; 42°57′08″N 85°29′10″W	Ada	
2	Aldrich Building	Aldrich Building	November 12, 1982 (#82000536)	98 Monroe Center, NW. 42°57′55″N 85°40′12″W	Grand Rapids	
3	Aldrich Godfrey and White Block	Aldrich Godfrey and White Block	January 27, 1999 (#99000052)	89-99 Monroe Center; 42°57′53″N 85°40′13″W	Grand Rapids	
4	Mathias J. Alten House and Studio	Mathias J. Alten House and Studio	June 23, 2009 (#08001102)	1593 East Fulton Street; 42°57′47″N 85°37′50″W	Grand Rapids	
5	American Box Board Company Headquarters and Factory	American Box Board Company Headquarters and Factory	November 24, 2020 (#100005823)	470 Market Ave. SW; 42°57′17″N 85°40′56″W	Grand Rapids	
6	American Seating Company Factory Complex	American Seating Company Factory Complex	July 25, 2003 (#03000687)	801 Broadway Ave., NW. 42°58′40″N 85°40′46″W	Grand Rapids	
7	Auburn Hills Historic District		August 14, 2025 (#100012128)	Auburn Avenue NE, Dale Court NE, Drexel Court NE, Palmer Court NE, Travis Street NE, and 1301 Sweet Street NE; 42°59′37″N 85°38′20″W	Grand Rapids	
8	Berkey and Gay Furniture Company Factory	Berkey and Gay Furniture Company Factory	December 20, 2000 (#00001486)	940 Monroe Ave., NW. 42°58′44″N 85°40′18″W	Grand Rapids	
9	John W. Blodgett Estate	John W. Blodgett Estate	July 28, 1983 (#83000877)	250 Plymouth Rd., SE. 42°57′26″N 85°37′25″W	East Grand Rapids	
10	Business Route M-21 – Plaster Creek Bridge	Business Route M-21 – Plaster Creek Bridge	December 17, 1999 (#99001522)	Business Loop Interstate 196/Chicago Drive over Plaster Creek; 42°56′09″N 85°41′14″W	Wyoming	
11	Central Furniture Company – H. E. Shaw Furniture Company Factory	Central Furniture Company – H. E. Shaw Furniture Company Factory	December 24, 2013 (#13000969)	400 Ionia Avenue, SW; 42°57′20″N 85°40′11″W	Grand Rapids	
12	Clipper Belt Lacer Company Complex	Clipper Belt Lacer Company Complex	December 26, 2023 (#100009650)	974-1010 Front Avenue NW; 42°58′54″N 85°40′31″W	Grand Rapids	
13	Irving Andrew and Olive Crane Kendall Dean House	Irving Andrew and Olive Crane Kendall Dean House	July 20, 2023 (#100009174)	2350 Leonard St, NW; 42°59′08″N 85°43′35″W	Grand Rapids	
14	Division Avenue – Plaster Creek Bridge	Division Avenue – Plaster Creek Bridge	December 17, 1999 (#99001523)	Division Ave. over Plaster Creek; 42°55′05″N 85°39′58″W	Grand Rapids	Bridge was replaced in 2007
15	Downtown Lowell Historic District	Downtown Lowell Historic District	December 9, 1999 (#99001539)	Roughly along Main St. between Hudson and Washington; 42°56′04″N 85°20′16″W	Lowell	
16	Eastern Avenue School	Eastern Avenue School	September 4, 2013 (#13000666)	758 Eastern Avenue, NE; 42°58′36″N 85°38′56″W	Grand Rapids	
17	Fallasburg Covered Bridge	Fallasburg Covered Bridge	March 16, 1972 (#72000627)	Covered Bridge Rd. 42°58′51″N 85°19′38″W	Lowell	
18	Fallasburg Historic District	Fallasburg Historic District	March 31, 1999 (#98001217)	Covered Bridge Rd. 42°58′56″N 85°19′24″W	Vergennes Township	
19	Fine Arts Building	Fine Arts Building	November 12, 1982 (#82000537)	220 Lyon St., NW. 42°58′01″N 85°40′26″W	Grand Rapids	
20	First (Park) Congregational Church	First (Park) Congregational Church	November 12, 1982 (#82000538)	10 E. Park Pl., NE. 42°57′51″N 85°39′56″W	Grand Rapids	
21	President Gerald R. Ford, Jr. Boyhood Home	President Gerald R. Ford, Jr. Boyhood Home	February 27, 1995 (#95000073)	649 Union Ave., SE. 42°57′02″N 85°39′15″W	Grand Rapids	
22	Fulton Manor	Fulton Manor	December 2, 2021 (#100007211)	1450 Fulton St. East; 42°57′45″N 85°38′05″W	Grand Rapids	
23	Goodspeed Brothers Building	Goodspeed Brothers Building	April 17, 1980 (#80001877)	188 Monroe St., NW. 42°58′00″N 85°40′19″W	Grand Rapids	
24	Graham House	Graham House	January 13, 1972 (#72000626)	323-325 Main St. 42°56′02″N 85°20′30″W	Lowell	
25	Grand Rapids Christian High School	Grand Rapids Christian High School	July 25, 2018 (#100002712)	415 Franklin St., SE. 42°56′55″N 85°39′31″W	Grand Rapids	The school's old campus.
26	Grand Rapids Savings Bank Building	Grand Rapids Savings Bank Building	December 28, 1990 (#90001956)	60 Monroe Center, NW. 42°57′52″N 85°40′07″W	Grand Rapids	
27	Grand Rapids Storage and Van Company Building	Grand Rapids Storage and Van Company Building	December 12, 2012 (#12001032)	1415 Lake Dr. SE; 42°57′27″N 85°38′04″W	Grand Rapids	Built in 1926, renovated into a mixed-use apartment structure and called the Kingsley Building.
28	Heartside Historic District	Heartside Historic District	March 2, 1982 (#82002844)	Division, Commerce, and Ionia Aves., Fulton, Weston, Oakes, and Cherry Sts.; also roughly Sheldon Blvd. SE, South Division Ave., Commerce Ave. SW, Ionia Ave. SW, Weston St. SE, Cherry St. SW, Williams St. SW, Bartlett St. SW, and Goodrich Street SW, all south of Fulton St. and north of Wealthy St. 42°57′42″N 85°40′09″W	Grand Rapids	Second set of addresses represent a boundary increase approved July 11, 2022.
29	Heritage Hill Historic District	Heritage Hill Historic District	March 11, 1971 (#71000399)	Bounded by Michigan Ave. on the north, Pleasant St. on the south, Union Ave. on the east, and Clarendon Pl. and Jefferson Ave. on the west 42°57′35″N 85°39′25″W	Grand Rapids	
30	Keeler Building	Keeler Building	November 27, 2017 (#80004806)	56 N Division Ave. 42°57′54″N 85°40′04″W	Grand Rapids	
31	Kent County Civil War Monument	Kent County Civil War Monument	July 14, 2004 (#04000690)	Division Ave. at Monroe Ave. 42°57′49″N 85°40′04″W	Grand Rapids	
32	Ladies' Literary Club	Ladies' Literary Club	October 26, 1971 (#71000400)	61 Sheldon St., SE. 42°57′45″N 85°40′01″W	Grand Rapids	
33	Ledyard Block Historic District	Ledyard Block Historic District	September 8, 1983 (#83000878)	123-145 Ottawa Ave., and 104-124 Monroe Center, NW. 42°57′57″N 85°40′14″W	Grand Rapids	
34	Lexington School	Lexington School	September 4, 2013 (#13000667)	45 Lexington Avenue, NW; 42°57′53″N 85°41′04″W	Grand Rapids	
35	Loraine Building	Loraine Building	November 24, 1982 (#82000539)	124 E. Fulton St. 42°57′47″N 85°39′56″W	Grand Rapids	
36	Medical Arts Building	Medical Arts Building	May 18, 2000 (#00000506)	26 Sheldon Blvd. SE. 42°57′44″N 85°39′58″W	Grand Rapids	
37	Metal Office Furniture Company (Steelcase) Plants No. 2 and 3	Metal Office Furniture Company (Steelcase) Plants No. 2 and 3	July 17, 2004 (#04000691)	401 Hall St. SW. 42°56′34″N 85°40′41″W	Grand Rapids	
38	Michigan Trust Company Building	Michigan Trust Company Building	February 24, 1983 (#83000879)	40 Pearl St., NW. 42°57′58″N 85°40′12″W	Grand Rapids	
39	Monroe Avenue Water Filtration Plant	Monroe Avenue Water Filtration Plant	July 31, 2002 (#02000815)	1430 Monroe Ave. NW. 42°59′14″N 85°40′12″W	Grand Rapids	
40	Mt. Mercy Academy and Convent	Mt. Mercy Academy and Convent	August 5, 1993 (#93000769)	1425 Bridge St., NW. 42°58′22″N 85°42′11″W	Grand Rapids	
41	Norton Mound Group	Norton Mound Group	October 15, 1966 (#66000396)	Between I-196 and Indian Mound Road; 42°56′12″N 85°43′19″W	Wyoming	
42	Augustus Paddock House	Augustus Paddock House	September 12, 1985 (#85002154)	1033 Lake Dr., SE. 42°57′36″N 85°38′34″W	Grand Rapids	
43	Peck Block	Peck Block	December 7, 2000 (#00001483)	34-50 Monroe Center NW. 42°57′51″N 85°40′07″W	Grand Rapids	
44	Abram W. Pike House	Abram W. Pike House	July 8, 1970 (#70000276)	230 Fulton St., E. 42°57′42″N 85°39′47″W	Grand Rapids	
45	Porter Hollow Embankment and Culvert	Porter Hollow Embankment and Culvert	September 24, 2001 (#01001018)	White Pine Trail at Stegman Creek, west of Summit Ave. 43°09′57″N 85°34′01″W	Algoma Township	
46	Rood Building	Rood Building	March 4, 1988 (#88000142)	139 Pearl Street; 42°57′59″N 85°40′20″W	Grand Rapids	
47	Saint Joseph Seminary	Saint Joseph Seminary	September 16, 2019 (#100004384)	600 Burton St. SE; 42°55′39″N 85°39′05″W	Grand Rapids	
48	Sisters of the Order of Saint Dominic Motherhouse Complex	Sisters of the Order of Saint Dominic Motherhouse Complex	April 7, 2022 (#100007588)	2025 Fulton St. E 42°57′55″N 85°37′10″W	Grand Rapids	Also known as Marywood Academy
49	Sixth Street Bridge	Sixth Street Bridge	August 13, 1976 (#76001030)	Spans Grand River between Newberry and 6th St. 42°58′36″N 85°40′27″W	Grand Rapids	
50	Sligh Furniture Company Building	Sligh Furniture Company Building	July 21, 2023 (#100009175)	211 Logan St, SW; 42°57′16″N 85°40′24″W	Grand Rapids	
51	St. Cecilia Society Building	St. Cecilia Society Building	December 9, 1971 (#71000401)	24-30 Ransom Ave., NE. 42°57′49″N 85°39′53″W	Grand Rapids	
52	Third Reformed Church	Third Reformed Church	April 22, 1982 (#82002845)	1009 Hermitage St., SE. 42°57′40″N 85°38′39″W	Grand Rapids	
53	Thornapple River Drive Bridge	Thornapple River Drive Bridge	April 18, 1990 (#90000570)	Thornapple River Dr. over Thornapple River; 42°56′23″N 85°29′29″W	Cascade Township	
54	Turner House	Turner House	July 8, 1970 (#70000277)	731 Front Ave., NW. 42°58′35″N 85°40′35″W	Grand Rapids	
55	U.S. Post Office	U.S. Post Office	July 10, 1974 (#74000990)	17 Pearl St. NW; 42°58′00″N 85°40′06″W	Grand Rapids	
56	John and Nellie Vander Jagt House		August 13, 2026 (#100013324)	2615 Plainfield Ave NE; 43°00′39″N 85°38′55″W	Grand Rapids	
57	Villa Maria	Villa Maria	March 27, 1987 (#86003373)	1315 Walker NW. 42°59′01″N 85°42′02″W	Grand Rapids	
58	Whitney Tavern Stand	Whitney Tavern Stand	February 1, 2007 (#06001326)	5283 Whitneyville Ave. 42°52′08″N 85°27′34″W	Cascade Township	
59	Willard Building	Willard Building	January 14, 2013 (#12001172)	150 E. Fulton St. 42°57′47″N 85°39′52″W	Grand Rapids	Built in 1930. Home of E. A. Rood & Company, a china and glassware specialty store for many years.

== Former listing ==
	Name on the Register	Image	Date listed	Date removed	Location	City or town	Description
1	Grand Rapids City Hall	Grand Rapids City Hall	May 12, 1969 (#69000375)	June 4, 1970	35 Lyon St., NW; 42°58′02″N 85°40′10″W	Grand Rapids	Demolished in December 1969.
2	Grand Rapids Cycle Company Factory	Grand Rapids Cycle Company Factory	June 16, 2004 (#04000600)	September 1, 2022	514 Butterworth St. SW. 42°57′35″N 85°40′53″W	Grand Rapids	In 2007 the building was destroyed by fire.

== See also ==
- List of Michigan State Historic Sites in Kent County, Michigan
- List of National Historic Landmarks in Michigan
- National Register of Historic Places listings in Michigan
- Listings in neighboring counties: Allegan, Barry, Ionia, Montcalm, Muskegon, Newaygo, Ottawa
