= Aldrich Building =

- U.S. National Register of Historic Places
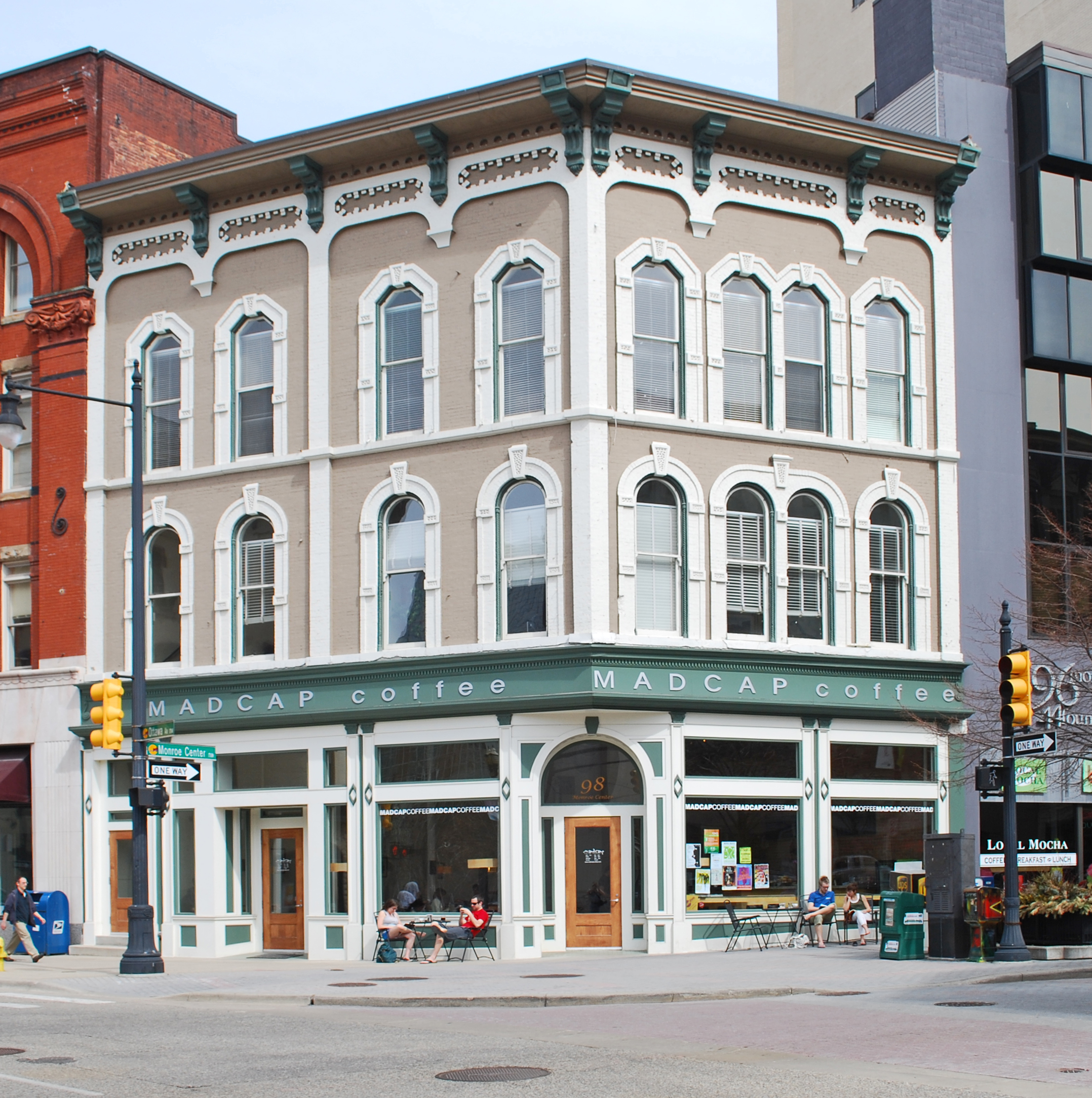

- Location within Michigan Location within the United States
- Interactive map
- Location: 98 Monroe Center, NW, Grand Rapids, Michigan
- Coordinates: 42°57′55″N 85°40′12″W
- Area: less than one acre
- Built: 1869
- Built by: Edward Wilson, John Harvey
- Architectural style: Italianate
- NRHP reference No.: 82000536
- Added to NRHP: November 12, 1982

The Aldrich Building is a historic building located at 98 Monroe Center, NW in Grand Rapids, Michigan. It has been listed on the National Register of Historic Places since November 12, 1982.

== History ==
The Aldrich Building was built in 1869 by druggists Edward Wilson and John Harvey, who operated their business from the first floor and rented out the upper floors. It was significant at the time for being the first building in Grand Rapids constructed with large plate glass windows in the storefronts. Wilson and Harvey owned the building until 1885, when it was purchased by Euphrasia Alcrich, whose family owned the buildings on either side. In 1887, a pair of physicians began practicing out of the building, and in 1910 the first dentist began practicing in the building. A dentistry practice operated in the building until at least the 1980s. In 1936, a Fannie Farmer Candies store moved into the first floor space, and remained there into the 21st century. They were replaced with a coffee shop in 2008. The building was renovated in 2013.

== Description ==
The Aldrich Building is a three-story brick commercial Italianate building, shaped like a wedge due to its location at the corner of two streets which form an obtuse angle. The first-floor facade was likely modernized in the early 20th century. Brick pilasters run from the street level up to a cornice line at the top of the building, where they merge with a brick frieze. The upper stories contain eight-foot-tall, one-over-one windows framed with brick molding. The window heads are semi-circular on the second floor and semi-hexagonal on the third. Decorative elements on the upper floors are constructed of brick, stone, and wood.
