= Rood Building =

- U.S. National Register of Historic Places
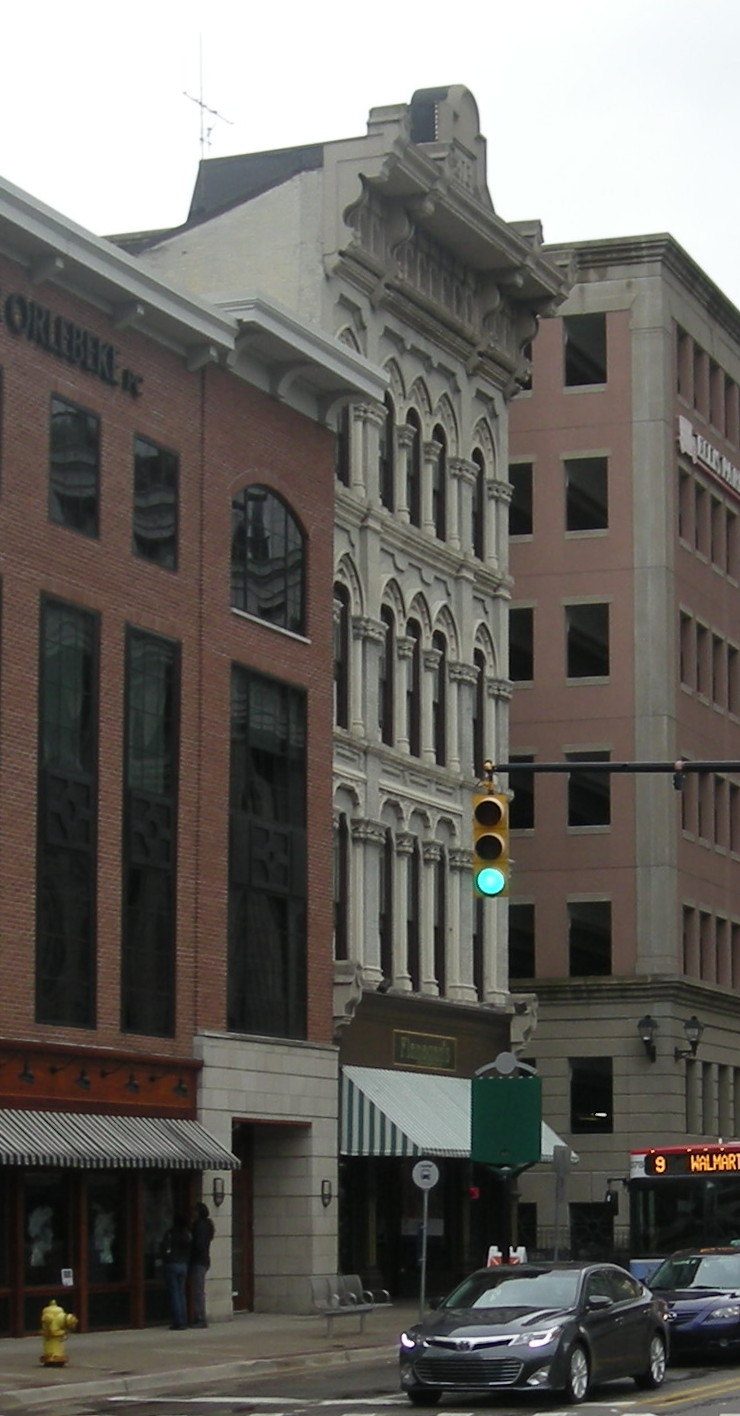
- Rood Building in 2014

- Location within Michigan Location within the United States
- Interactive map
- Location: 139 Pearl Street, NW, Grand Rapids, Michigan (Note: The property is listed as "Address Restricted" in the NRIS database)
- Coordinates: 42.9666°N 85.6717°W
- Built: 1873
- Architect: William G. Robinson
- Architectural style: High Victorian Gothic
- NRHP reference No.: 88000142
- Added to NRHP: March 4, 1988

The Rood Building is a commercial building in Grand Rapids, Michigan, listed on the National Register of Historic Places. It was built in 1873 for Charles Conant Rood, after whom the building is named.

== History ==
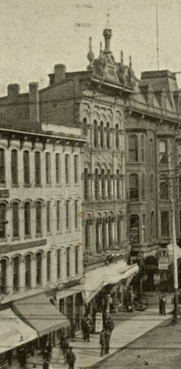
Rood Building circa 1904

The Rood Building was built in 1873 for attorney and investor Charles Conant Rood. It replaced a three-story building at the site, also owned by Rood, which had burned down in October 1872. It was designed by Grand Rapids architect William G. Robinson. Over the years, the building's tenants have generally consisted of offices or residences and at least one restaurant.

The building underwent renovations in the 1980s, which included the installation of a wooden replica cornice and an addition that filled in the angle of the building's original "L" shape. The building was added to the National Register of Historic Places on March 4, 1988.

== Architecture ==
The Rood Building is a four-story timber frame structure clad in brick. It is the only surviving High Victorian Gothic commercial building in Grand Rapids and one of only a few High Victorian buildings in the city.

The building originally had an L-shaped layout; the head of the "L" formed the narrow facade on Pearl Street and the foot of the "L" had a couple storefronts on a former pedestrian walkway. An addition built in the 1980s filled in the angle of the "L" and houses an elevator and stairwell.

The Pearl Street facade is divided into three bays; the central bay is three windows wide and the two narrower bays on each side have one window each. The facade is topped by a large cornice bearing the year of construction, 1873. The cornice was originally made of iron, but it deteriorated and the last part was removed by the late 1970s; it was replaced with a replica made of painted wood.

== See also ==
- National Register of Historic Places listings in Kent County, Michigan
