= Fulton Manor =

- U.S. National Register of Historic Places
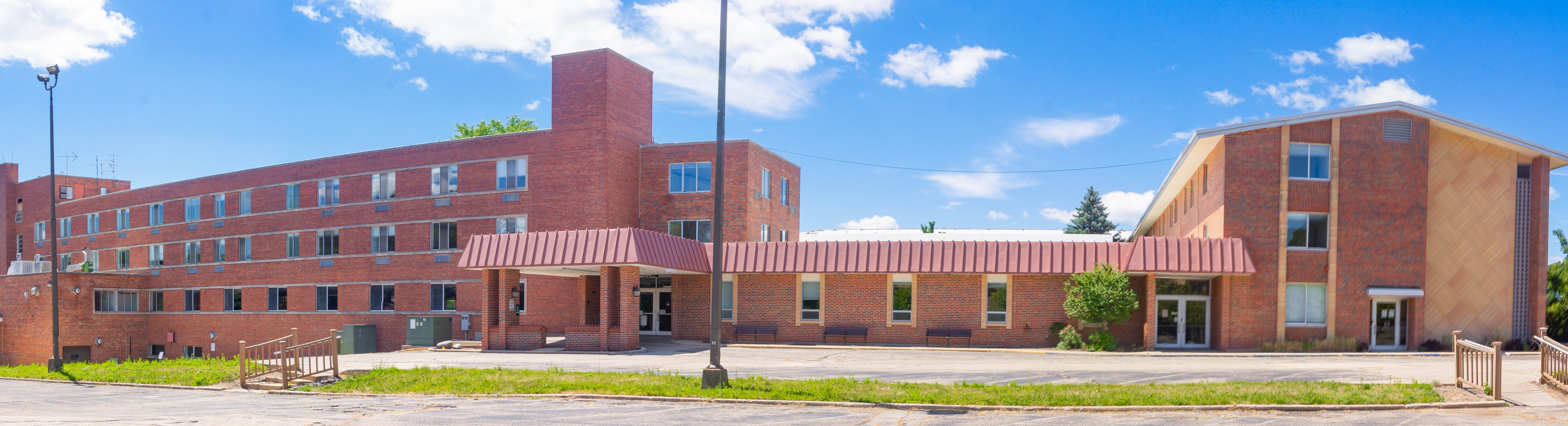
- Fulton Manor, 2022

- Location within Michigan Location within the United States
- Interactive map
- Location: 1450 Fulton Street East, Grand Rapids, Michigan
- Coordinates: 42°57′45″N 85°38′5″W
- Built: 1952
- Built by: Strom Construction, Pioneer Construction
- Architect: James K. Haveman
- Architectural style: Modern
- NRHP reference No.: 100007211
- Added to NRHP: December 2, 2021

Fulton Manor is a former retirement home located at 1450 Fulton Street East in Grand Rapids, Michigan. It was listed on the National Register of Historic Places in 2021.

== History ==
In 1892, Adrian Kriekard, minister of the Third Reformed Church, formed the Holland United Benevolent Association, to, as the group's charter stated, "provide a home for aged, indigent and infirm persons of general good conduct and character." They opened Holland Home on the corner of Michigan Street and College Avenue later that year, and by 1894 could house 46 people. By 1910, the group realized more space was needed, and in 1912 they purchased this property on Fulton Street. A new Holland Home opened here in December 1912 with space for 75 residents. Additions were constructed in 1917 and 1924.

After World War II, Holland Home realized the 1912 building would soon be outdated, and hired local architect James K. Haveman to design further additions, and to create a master plan that would include demolition of the earlier buildings. Phase I of the master plan (the West Building) was constructed in 1952. Phase II (East Building) followed in 1958, with Phase III (Grace Building) in 1967, and Phase IV (Fulton Building) in 1971. The 1912 building and its additions were removed in 1966. A final building, the Van Andel Pavilion, was added in 1998.

Meanwhile, Holland Home had expanded to other campuses in the area, and by the 2010s was one of the largest providers of elderly housing and nursing care in West Michigan. In 2017, Holland Home made the decision to invest in their other campuses rather than rehabilitate Fulton Manor. In 2021, Hope Network purchased the Fulton Manor campus, with plans to redevelop it to provide low-income housing.

== Description ==
The Fulton Manor complex is a series of five buildings, joined together but constructed at different times, that were designed by architect James K. Haveman to follow a mater plan. The East Building (1954) and West Building (1959) run north and south, parallel to each other. The Grace Building (1967) is L-shaped, and connected to the north side of the West Building. The Fulton Building (1971) runs east and west at the north end of the Grace Building, with a connector running to the East Building. The Van Andel Pavilion (1998) sits in the crux of the Grace Building's L shape.

The buildings are a vernacular Modern style with clean lines and simple elements. They are all constructed of aw arm red brick, with inset windows and minimal ornamentation.
