= Kingsley Building =

- Grand Rapids Storage and Van Company Building
- U.S. National Register of Historic Places
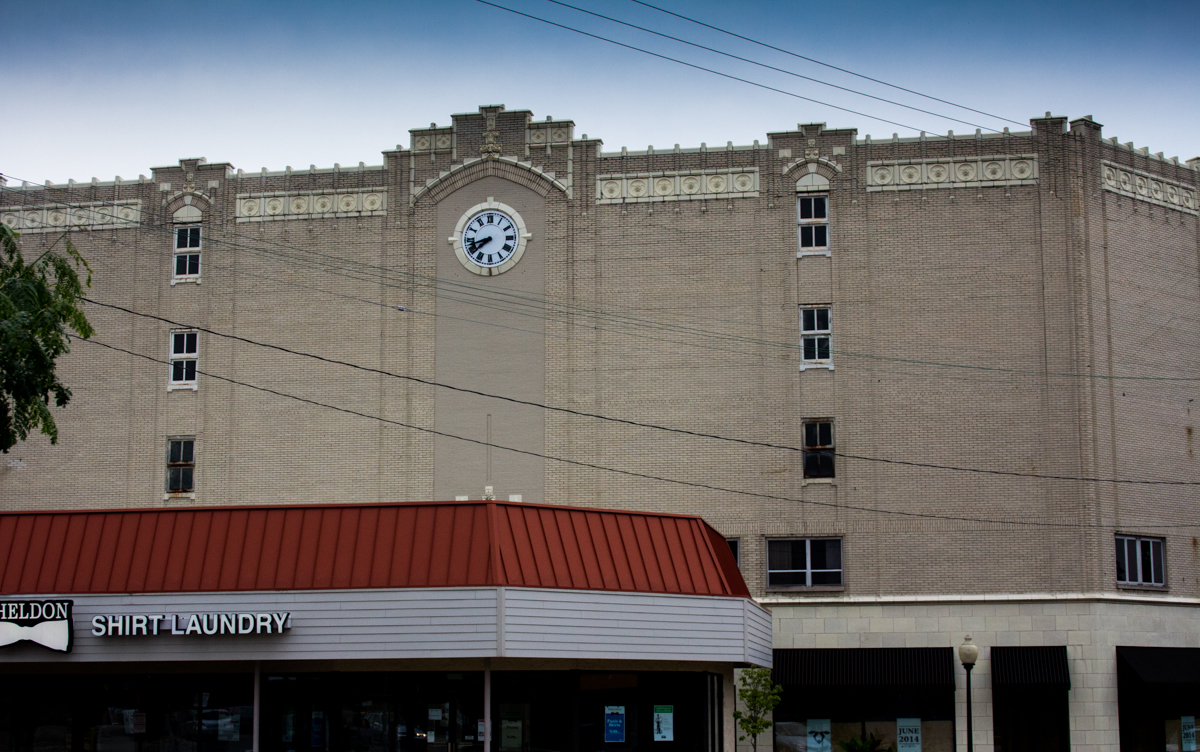

- Location within Michigan Location within the United States
- Interactive map
- Location: 1415 Lake Dr. SE., Grand Rapids, Michigan
- Coordinates: 42°57′27″N 85°38′4″W
- Area: less than one acre
- Built: 1926
- Built by: John McNabb & Sons
- Architect: George S. Kingsley
- Architectural style: Gothic inspired
- NRHP reference No.: 12001032
- Added to NRHP: December 12, 2012

The Kingsley Building is a mixed use apartment building located at 1415 Lake Drive SE in Grand Rapids, Michigan. It was originally a warehouse and office building called the Grand Rapids Storage and Van Company Building. It was listed on the National Register of Historic Places in 2012.

== History ==
In 1905, Fuller & Rice Lumber Company opened a yard at this location. In 1919, the company of Kammen & Vander Stel Packing and Storage (later Grand Rapids Storage and Van) was founded. In 1926, the company purchased the former Fuller & Rice lot, and hired architect George S. Kingsley to design a new headquarters building. The new building was intended to be a mixed-use space, combining storage facilities for household goods, offices, and commercial space. By the 1940s, the need for storage of household goods was in decline, and the company began renting out space in the building. In 1954, Zondervan Publishing began leasing several floors in the building. Over time, Grand Rapids Storage occupied a smaller and smaller percentage of the building space while Zondervan's occupancy grew. Grand Rapids Storage ceased using the building in 1962, and passed out of existence a few years later. Zondervan's purchased the building in 1975, by which time it had grown large enough to acquire multiple other buildings. They moved out in 1990.

The building was later acquired by Grand Rapids developer Bazzani Associates, and renovation into mixed-use space began in 2011. In 2016, renovation of the top floors into apartments started.

== Description ==
The Kingsley Building is a five-story brick structure with a trapezoidal footprint. Terra cotta decoration runs across the roofline, below which one-brick-wide vertical strips outline the bays, running down the fifth through second floors. Multiple storefronts are located on the first floor. The building originally had few windows on the upper floors. Multiple exterior windows with balconies were inserted into building during renovation into apartments.
