= Mt. Mercy Apartments =

- Mt. Mercy Academy and Convent
- U.S. National Register of Historic Places
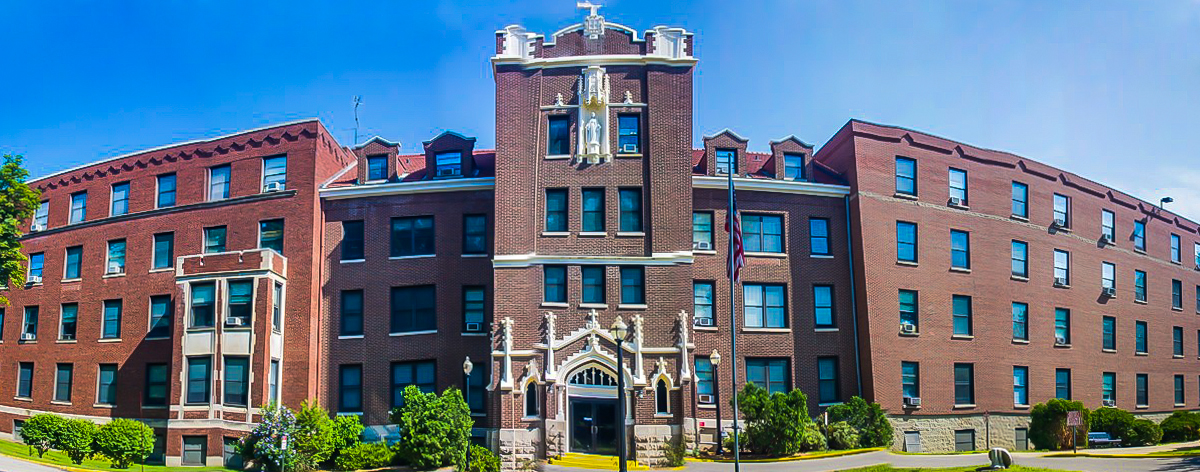

- Location within Michigan Location within the United States
- Interactive map
- Location: 1425 Bridge St., NW, Grand Rapids, Michigan
- Area: 29.9 acres (12.1 ha)
- Built: 1917
- Built by: John McNabb & Sons
- Architect: E. Brielmair & Son, Harry L. Mead, Charles Sullivan, Roger Allen & Associates
- Architectural style: Tudor Revival
- NRHP reference No.: 93000769
- Added to NRHP: August 5, 1993

The Mt. Mercy Apartments is an apartment complex for retirees, located at 1425 Bridge Street NW in Grand Rapids, Michigan. It was formerly a Catholic convent and private school known as the Mt. Mercy Academy and Convent. The building was listed on the National Register of Historic Places in 1993.

== History ==
In 1872, Father Patrick J. McManus of St. Andrew's parish invited a small group from the Sisters of Mercy Convent in Brooklyn, New York to Grand Rapids to teach at the newly opened St. Andrew's School. Four sisters arrived, and established an independent religious community, called the Sisters of Mercy of the Grand Rapids Diocese. The co-educational St. Andrew's School was well received by the community, but Mother Joseph Lynch, the head of the Mercy Sisters, wished to open an all-girl school in its place. Father McManus disagreed, and the two parted way. The sisters opened the Academy of Our Lady of Mercy for girls in 1877, but it soon closed due to financial pressures. The sisters, feeling the same financial pressures, turned to medicine and opened a hospital in Big Rapids, Michigan in 1879 to tend to lumberjacks. The move was successful, and the order spent the rest of the 1800s in Big Rapids.

By the 1910s, lumbering in Michigan had almost disappeared, and the order decided to return to Grand Rapids. In 1914, they purchased the Harrison House on Bridge Street, and commissioned local architect Joseph F. Smith to remodel the house and build a two-story annex to house the order. The new mother house opened in 1915, but soon proved too small to provide for retiring sisters or the ongoing education of active sisters. The order hired the Milwaukee form of Brielmaier & Son, of Milwaukee to draw up plans for a new building. Due to financial constraints, the order decided to construct the building in stages. They hired local contractor John McNabb & Sons to build the structure, and began construction in 1917. The first section was done the following year, and a chapel in 1919.

With the move back to Grand Rapids, the order again became involved in teaching. They opened a K-12 school in 1918, which by 1920 had grown to 65 students and was accredited by the University of Michigan. The academy steadily grew during the 1920s, and in 1924 the order hired local architect Harry L. Mead to design a laundry/power plant building. In 1927 the original Harrison House burned down. The school continued to grow through the Great Depression and on into the World War II years. In 1944, anticipating a greater need, the sisters built a five-level classroom and residence building, designed by Charles Sullivan of Detroit. However, even this was not enough to meet the baby boom demand, and in 1955 the school discontinued grades 1-6. In 1961, grades 7-8 were discontinued, as well as the boarding school, with only room for the day high school. With the closure of the boarding school, plans were drawn up to convert the 1944 building into only classrooms; before that could be accomplished, though, new living quarters for the sisters need to be constructed. The order hired local architect Roger Allen & Associates to design a two-story addition to the 1944 building.

However, 1963 marked peak enrollment in the school. Enrollment declined through the remainder of the 1960s, and in In 1972, the order made the decision to phase out the school. Grades 9-10 were eliminated that summer, and the last two graduating classes left in 1973 and 1974. The campus was still used to house retired and invalid sisters. In the 1980s, the order decided to centralize services, and the remaining sisters were moved to new housing in Farmington Hills, Michigan.

The complex was vacant for some time, but in 1991, the Grand Rapids Housing Commission purchased the Mt. Mercy complex to provide low-income housing. It was decided that renovating the 1962 wing would be infeasible, and that portion of the complex was razed, and replaced with a new wing in keeping with the original and the 1940s addition. Another addition was completed in 2001, and the complex continues to provide housing for low-income seniors.

== Description ==
The Mt. Mercy Apartments consists of three buildings. The main building is a five-story lower-case-h-shaped, five-level, Tudor Revival structure. constructed in multiple stages. The original building (dating from 1918) and chapel wing (1920) have structural steel frames and are faced with dark brown-red brick. The west wing (completed in 1944) is constructed of cast-in-place concrete, and is faced with brick that is slightly lighter than the original. The east wing addition (from 1991) is a reinforced concrete structure, and reflects the size, massing and roof line of the west wing. The east wing is faced with brick of a lighter hue than either of the earlier sections. A 2005 rear addition completes the building.

The main building is a five-story Tudor Revival style structure with a squared tower in the front containing the main entrance. Projecting pinnacles and stone tracery are set around the entrance; some of the windows in the tower above contain similar stone tracery. A stone niche with a statue of the Madonna is set above the entrance; above that is the order's blazon. The facade is topped with battlements. The battlements, buttresses, and piers are capped with stone. A gabled roof covered with clay tile covers the building. The foundation is of rough cut stone.

The other two buildings are a two-story laundry/power house (built in 1924) clad with brick located just to the north of the chapel wing, and a single-story, frame, brick clad, two-bedroom ranch style house from 1962 located north of main building.
