= Lexington School (Grand Rapids, Michigan) =

- U.S. National Register of Historic Places
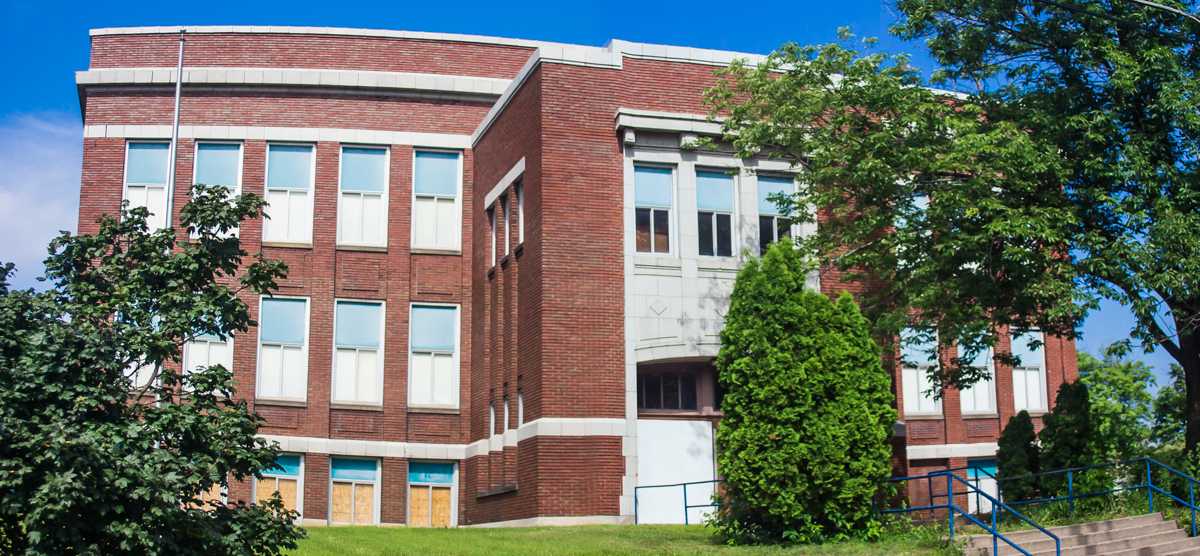

- Location within Michigan Location within the United States
- Interactive map
- Location: 45 Lexington, NW., Grand Rapids, Michigan
- Coordinates: 42°57′53″N 85°41′04″W
- Area: 1.6 acres (0.65 ha)
- Built: 1915
- Built by: Horner & Kelly
- Architect: Henry H. Turner
- Architectural style: Classical Revival, Bungalow/craftsman
- NRHP reference No.: 13000667
- Added to NRHP: September 4, 2013

The Lexington School is a former public school building located at 45 Lexington, NW, in Grand Rapids, Michigan, United States. It was listed on the National Register of Historic Places in 2013. As of 2015, the building was slated for redevelopment into apartments.

== History ==
A Lexington School building was constructed in this neighborhood in the 1860s. By 1913, however, the earlier school building was well out of date, and the Grand Rapids Board of Education decided to replace it. In early 1915, money was allocated and a plot of land just to the south of the 1860s school was obtained. The houses on the new plot were demolished, and Board architect Henry H. Turner designed a new elementary school. General contractors Horner & Kelly were hired to construct the building. This new school contained facilities reflecting the newest trends in education at the time, including a library, gymnasium, and a kindergarten. The library, in fact, was a branch of the Grand Rapids Public Library, an innovation particular to Grand Rapids. The new school opened in April 1915. The 1860s school was eventually demolished.

The school served as a neighborhood elementary until 1997, when it was converted into the Academia de Espanol, the district's Spanish immersion program school. The school closed in 2008 and was sold to a developer in 2012. As of 2015, the school was slated to be redeveloped into apartments.

== Description ==
The Lexington School is a 2 1/2-story red-brick building, with sandstone-colored terra cotta trim and a flat roof. The water table and window sills are of sandstone. The school is of Classical Revival design, with simplified detailing reflecting craftsman influence. The building is I-shaped, with projecting, two-story entryways on each of the short facades. The entries themselves are recessed, and the entry projections feature surrounds extending up to the second level, which contains a group of three windows and a terra cotta cornice with a stepped parapet above. The main body of the building has wide window openings with terra cotta banding above and a terra cotta cornice below the roof line. A parapet wall tops the facade.
