= Willard Building (Grand Rapids, Michigan) =

- U.S. National Register of Historic Places
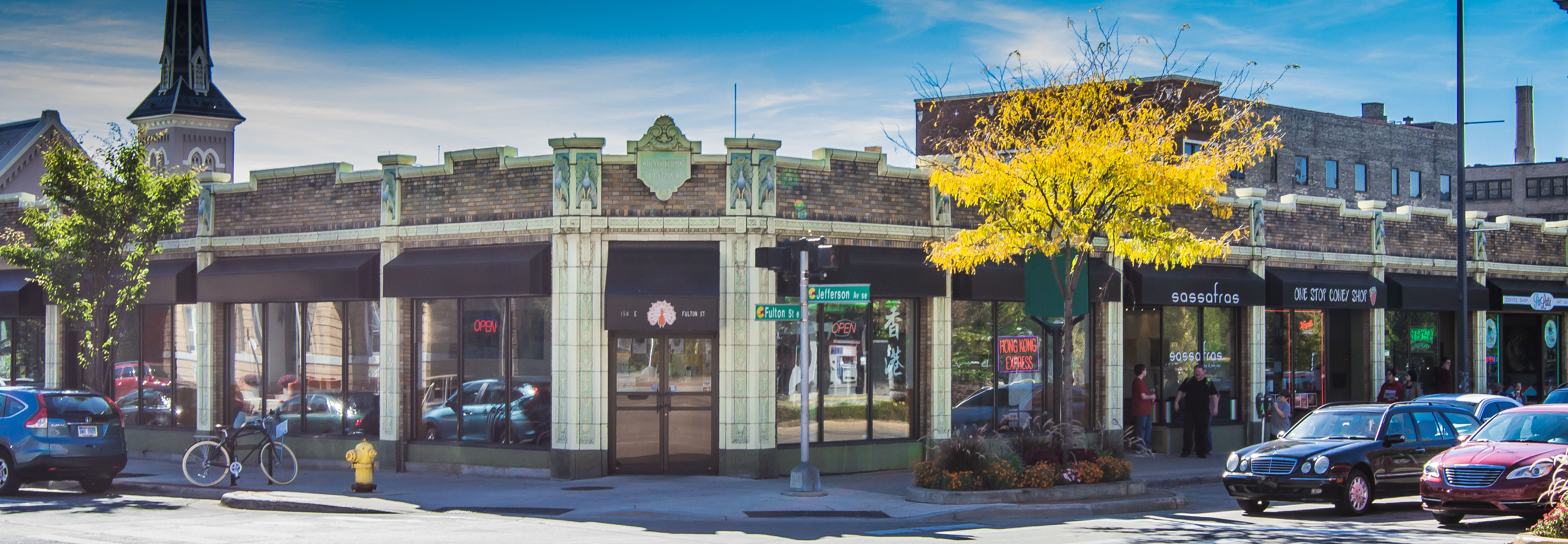

- Location within Michigan Location within the United States
- Interactive map
- Location: 150 E. Fulton St., Grand Rapids, Michigan
- Coordinates: 42°57′47″N 85°39′52″W
- Area: less than one acre
- Built: 1930
- Built by: Owen-Ames-Kimball Co.
- Architect: Benjamin W. Hertel
- Architectural style: Classical Revival, Art Deco
- NRHP reference No.: 12001172
- Added to NRHP: January 14, 2013

The Willard Building, also known as the Peacock Building for the distinctive terra cotta decorative birds spaced at the top of the facades, is a retail building located at 150 East Fulton Street in Grand Rapids, Michigan. It was listed on the National Register of Historic Places in 2013.

== History ==
Dr. Willard M. Burleson began practicing medicine in Grand Rapids in 1899. He was joined by his brother, the practice grew, and he began specializing in the non-surgical treatment of "rectal disorders." In 1911, Burleson purchased an apartment building, the Wellington Flats, located at the present site of the Willard Building. He renamed it the Burleson Sanitarium and moved his practice into the building. At first, unused rooms were rented as hotel rooms, but by 1920 the practice had nine doctors and was using all the rooms. The practice moved out of the building in 1927. Burleson died the next year, and some of his partners went on the form the Ferguson Droste Ferguson Hospital while the Burleson Sanitarium continued to operate under the direction of Burleson's brother.

In 1929, Burleson's estate demolished the former Wellington Flats and hired contractor Owen-Ames-Kimball, and their in-house architect, Benjamin W. Hertel, to construct a new single-story commercial building at the site. The building was completed and open for business in 1930. Among the first tenants were a Kroger grocery and bakery, an antique shop, and a florist. A series of other tenants filled the building through the Great Depression, into the 1950s, and on into the 21st century.

== Description ==
The Willard Building is a single-story, tan brick, L-shaped, commercial building located on a street corner, having two main facades. The building mixes Classical Revival and Art Deco design elements. Multiple storefronts line both facades, separated by terra cotta piers decorated with urns, crests, and acanthus leaf designs. Across the top of the building is an undulating parapet with terra cotta trim. At the top of each pier is a distinctive multi colored terracotta peacock.
