= Sligh Furniture Company Building =

- U.S. National Register of Historic Places
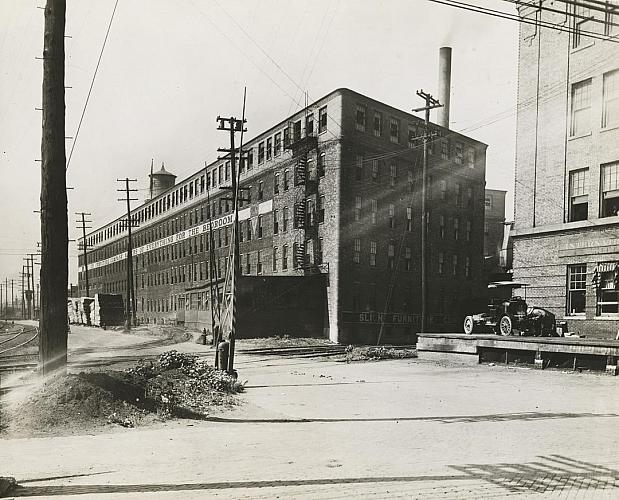
- Sligh Factory c. 1910

- Location within Michigan Location within the United States
- Interactive map
- Location: 211 Logan St, SW Grand Rapids, Michigan
- Coordinates: 42°57′16″N 85°40′24″W
- Built: 1880
- Architect: William G. Robinson; Houser Owen & Ames; W.M. Clarke; Williamson, Crow & Proctor; Owen-Ames-Kimball
- Architectural style: Italianate, Modern
- NRHP reference No.: 100009175
- Added to NRHP: July 21, 2023

The Sligh Furniture Company Building, also known as the Nash-Kelvinator Corporation Plant No. 15, is a former factory located at 211 Logan Street SW in Grand Rapids, Michigan. It was listed on the National Register of Historic Places in 2023.

== History ==
By the late 1800s, Grand Rapids was a major hub for furniture production. In 1874, Charles R. Sligh Sr. began working for the Berkey & Gay Company as a salesman. In 1880, he decided to strike out on his own, and raised $10,500 to incorporate Sligh Furniture Company. The company purchased a plot of land and constructed a 15,000 square foot factory. The company began selling bedroom furniture, and was quickly successful. They constructed an addition to the factory in 1882, and a second one in 1888. Further additions were made in the 1890s and early in the 20th century, and by 1913 the factory contained 325,000 square feet. Twelve years later the footage had grown to 610,000 square feet.

However, after about this time the company slowly declined. There was greater competition from southern firms, and the Great Depression dealt a major blow to the company. In 1932, the Sligh Furniture Company stockholders liquidated the company's assets and furniture operations at the factory ceased. Portions of the building were leased as warehouse space over the next decade. In 1948, the Nash-Kelvinator company purchased and renovated the building for use as a warehouse. Several small additions were constructed in the 1960s, and in 1984 Nash-Kelvinator sold the building. It was used as rental space for various small businesses, and continues to be used for that purpose as of 2023. A redevelopment of the building is planned.

== Description ==
The Sligh Furniture Company Building is a large, L-shaped factory building containing about 650,000 square feet of space. The architecture is very utilitarian, with some influences from Italianate and Modern sources. The exterior is primarily brick, with some concrete additions. It has a flat roof with a brick parapet; the window openings are uniform and regularly spaced. The building was constructed in stages over time, and different additions vary in height and appearance. The eastern wing portion of the building is of brick construction, and ranges from five to seven stories tall. The western section is built if concrete and is seven stories tall.
