= Klingman Lofts =

- Central Furniture Company-H.E. Shaw Furniture Company Factory
- U.S. National Register of Historic Places
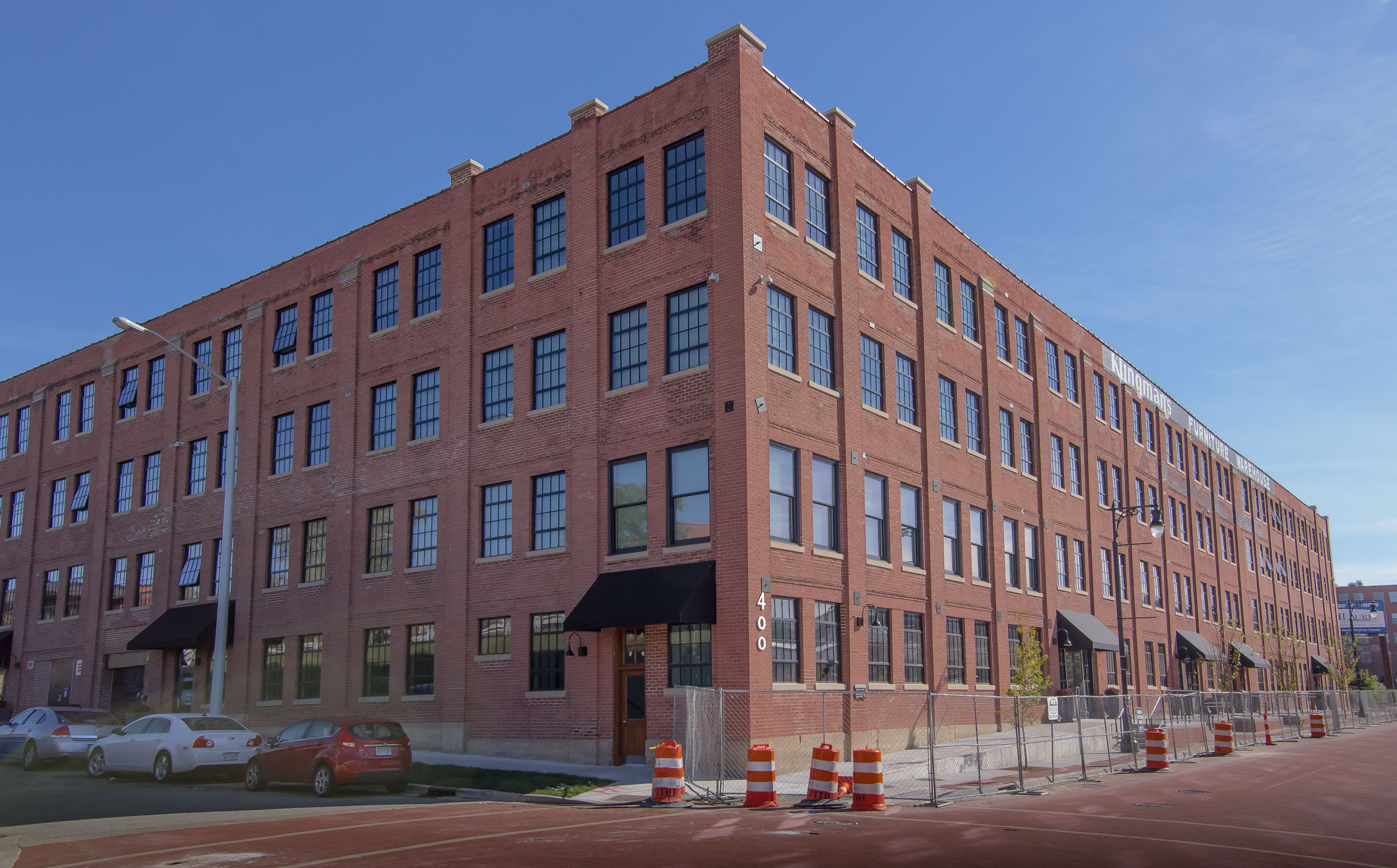

- Location within Michigan Location within the United States
- Interactive map
- Location: 400 Ionia Ave., SW., Grand Rapids, Michigan
- Coordinates: 42°57′20″N 85°40′11″W
- Area: 0 acres (0 ha)
- Built: 1895
- Built by: Barnes Brothers Construction
- Architect: James Price
- Architectural style: Timber-frame Brick Factory
- NRHP reference No.: 13000969
- Added to NRHP: November 8, 2013

The Klingman Lofts is a former industrial building that has been converted to residential use, located at 400 Ionia Avenue SW, in Grand Rapids, Michigan. It was built in stages, beginning in 1895, as a furniture factory, and was formerly known as the Central Furniture Company Factory and the H.E. Shaw Furniture Company Factory. It was listed on the National Register of Historic Places in 2013. The building was renovated into apartment space in 2015.

== History ==
Grand Rapids had a long history of furniture making companies. One of these, the Grand Rapids Folding Chair and Table Company, was established in 1881 and had a factory located on this site, at the intersection of Ionia Avenue SW and Wealthy Street. In late 1892, the factory was almost completely destroyed by fire. In 1893, Charles Snyder founded the Central Furniture Company and purchased the factory site. Central Furniture constructed a new three-story building at the site and began producing bookcases, ladies desks, music cabinets, and buffets at the new site. The company grew over the years, adding another factory wing in the late 1890s and adding a fourth floor to the original building in 1903. IN 1905, the company changed its name to the Shelton & Snyder Furniture Company, and built yet another large addition to the factory. In 1910, the company was reorganized as the Snyder Furniture Company; in 1917 it was sold to Harry E. Shaw, who renamed it the Shaw Furniture Company, and finally in 1918 changed the name to the H.E Shaw Furniture Company. In 1921-22 and 1924, the company hired local architect James Price to design large additions to the original factory. H. E. Shaw continued the furniture line of the previous companies, manufacturing desks, secretaries, and dining room furniture out of oak, walnut, and mahogany. However, the Great Depression affected many furniture manufacturers, and H. E. Shaw was no exception. They saw their business rapidly dwindle, and closed in 1933.

After H. E. Shaw's closure, the Schoonbeck Company used a section of the factory complex to manufacture upholstered furniture. Schoonbeck was in the building from 1934 until 1968. After Schoonbeck moved, the space was used as a warehouse by the Klingman Furniture Company until 1999. Other tenants over the years included the Luce Furniture Company, the Robinson Furniture Company, and SFS Corporation. The building became vacant in 2000. In 2014, redevelopment of the complex began, and it was converted to house 83 apartments, along with 15,000 square feet of retail space. The project was completed in 2015.

== Description ==
The Klingman Lofts is a complex of connected building, constructed between 1895 and 1924. They are three- and four-story timber-framed brick buildings on concrete foundations with flat roofs. The oldest building is a four-story, L-shaped structure located at the comer of Ionia Avenue and McConnell Street. It waws originally a three-story building, with the fourth floor added in 1903. The second-oldest section is a four-story building made of red brick. The building is four bays wide and ten bays long, with each bay containing a large, segmental-arch-head window. The third section is a four-story, L-shaped building extending north to the intersection of Ionia Avenue and Wealthy Street. The fourth building is a four-story structure fronting north on Wealthy Street. The construction of these two buildings is essentially similar, and they run seventeen bays along Ionia Avenue, eleven bays along Wealthy Street, and six bays on McConnell Street.
