= Keeler Building =

- U.S. National Register of Historic Places
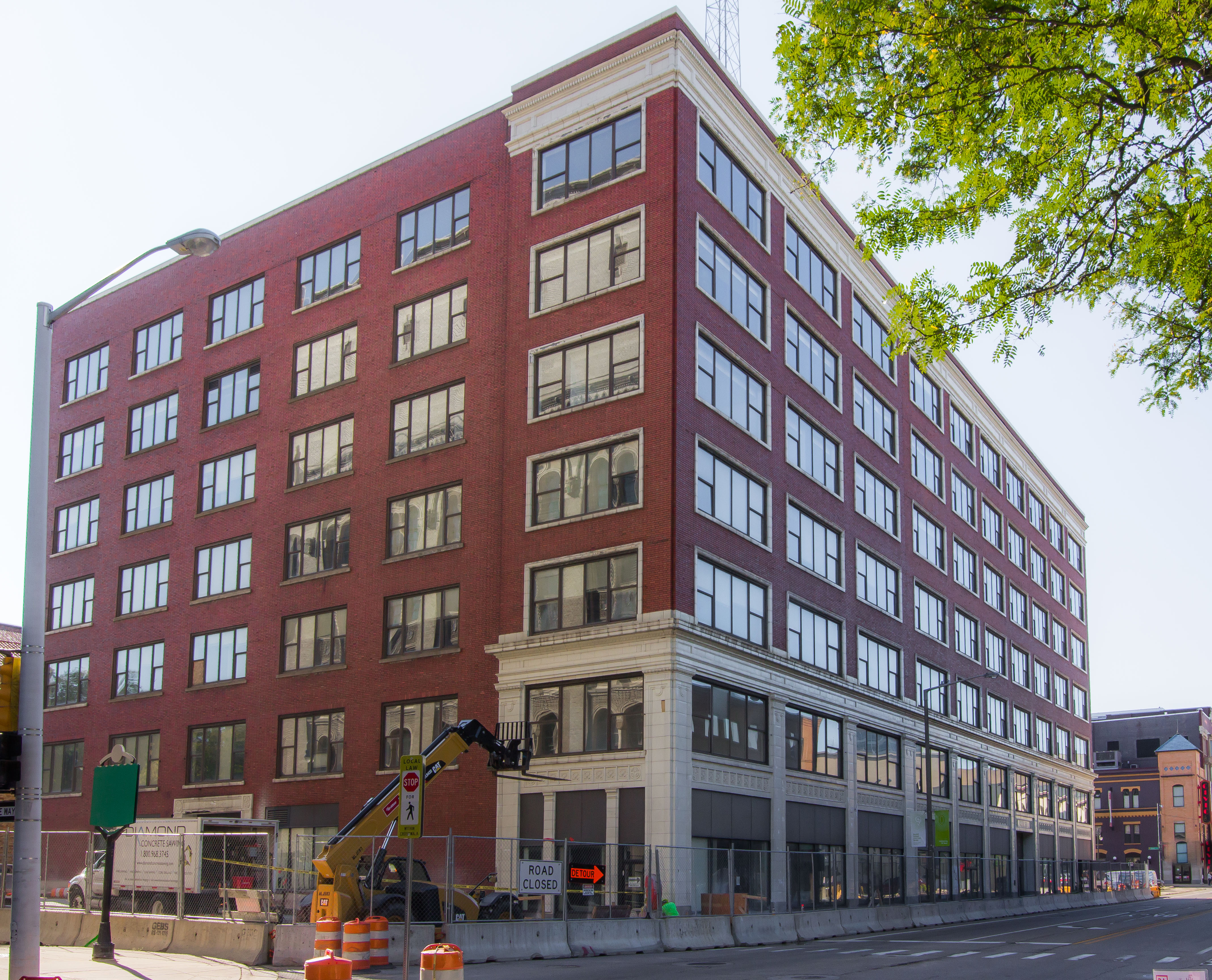

- Location within Michigan Location within the United States
- Interactive map
- Location: 56 N Division Ave., Grand Rapids, Michigan
- Coordinates: 42°57′54″N 85°40′04″W
- Area: 0 acres (0 ha)
- Built: 1911
- Built by: Owen Ames & Kimball
- Architect: Eugene Osgood
- Architectural style: Chicago school
- MPS: Historic Engineering and Industrial Sites in Michigan TR
- NRHP reference No.: 80004806
- Added to NRHP: November 27, 2017

The Keeler Building is a former furniture exhibition building located at 56 North Division Avenue in Grand Rapids, Michigan. It was listed on the National Register of Historic Places in 2017. As of 2017, the building was slated for renovation into apartments.

== History ==
In the early 1910s, the founders of Keeler Brass decided to construct a showroom for local furniture manufacturers in downtown Grand Rapids. They hired architect Eugene Osgood to design a new building, and contractor Owen Ames & Kimball to build it. Construction was completed in 1911, and the building was substantially expanded in 1913. Local furniture manufacturers like Baker Furniture Company, Herman Miller Inc. and Kindel Furniture Company leasing space in the structure rented space in the building. In 1941, the building was converted into office space, with tenants including eased to the Michigan Bell Telephone, Western Union, and radio station WLAV. It was sold in 1958 and passed through multiple owners before 1980, when it was purchased by Amway. Amway planned to move staff to the building, but would end up selling it in 1984. By this time, the building was nearly vacant, and it was resold in 1995, with the new owners evicting the remaining tenants. It remained vacant until 2017, when plans were started to convert the building into apartments.

Although originally nominated to the National Register in 1980, the building was not actually listed due to owner objection until ownership changed hands in 2017.

== Description ==
The Keeler Building is a seven-story brick Chicago school building with applied masonry detailing. The main construction is of steel and concrete. The interior contains 140,000 square feet of space.
