= Clipper Belt Lacer Company Complex =

Historic factory buildings in Michigan, US

- U.S. National Register of Historic Places
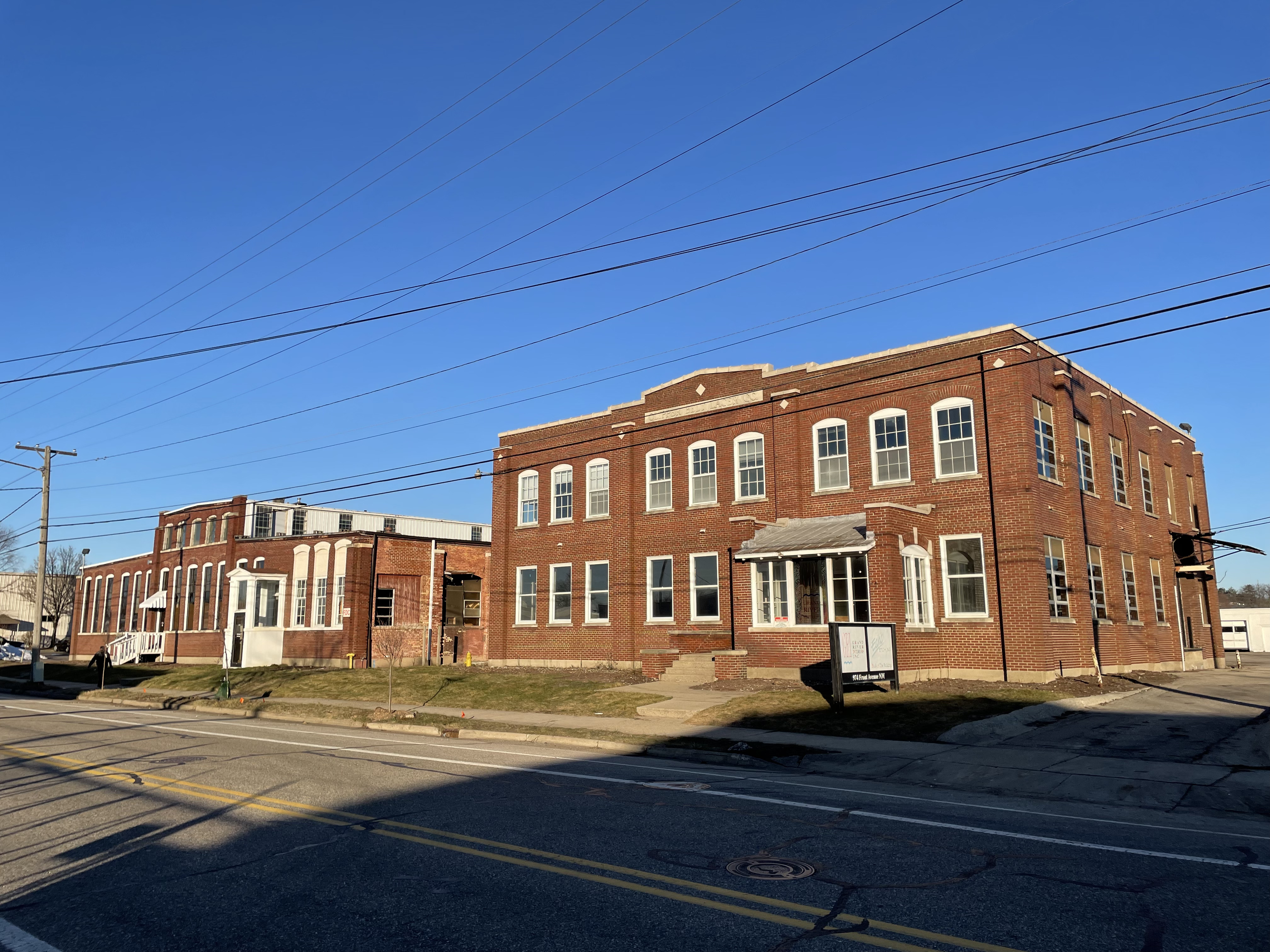
- Clipper Belt Lacer Company Complex, 2024

- Location within Michigan Location within the United States
- Interactive map
- Location: 974-1010 Front Avenue NW Grand Rapids, Michigan
- Coordinates: 42°58′54″N 85°40′31″W
- Built: 1912
- Built by: Hauser-Owen-Ames, Owen-Ames-Kimball
- Architect: Robinson & Campau
- NRHP reference No.: 100009650
- Added to NRHP: December 26, 2023

The Clipper Belt Lacer Company Complex is a complex of seven former factory buildings located at 974-1010 Front Avenue NW in Grand Rapids, Michigan. It was listed on the National Register of Historic Places in 2023.

== History ==
James Barns Stone was born in Grand Rapids in 1861 and immigrated to England in his mid-twenties, finding work as a manufacturer's representative for various companies. By 1890, Stone operated his own company in London: J. B. Stone & Company, which repaired the leather belting used by industrial machines at the time. The system used wire hooks to efficiently repair machines on the factory floor. On a visit home to Grand Rapids, Stone learned that there were no such devices marketed locally, and in 1905 set up a sister company, J. B. Stone & Co., along with his brother, Frank A. Stone.

The company was immediately successful, and moved to a larger building. In 1908 the company was re-incorporated as the Flexible Belt Lacing Company, and in 1909 James Stone sold his interest in the company and returned to England. The Grand Rapids company grew and improved its product, and in 1912 changed its name to the Clipper Belt Lacer Company. Around the same time, construction started on a new factory on Front Street. The building was finished in 1912, and an addition was finished the next year. By 1916 the company employed 100 workers, and added an office building, In 1917 a boiler room, loading dock, and garage were constructed, and a warehouse in 1920.

With the onset of the Great Depression, Clipper's sales declined, but the company survived and began diversifying its product line. In the 1970s, the factory was modernized, and a period of growth led to the construction of another warehouse in 1980. By this time, the company was outgrowing the Front Street space, and in 1982 it moved to an industrial park on the outskirts of Grand Rapids. In 1994, the company was purchased by Flexco, a competing company located in Downers Grove, Illinois.

After Clipper moved from the Front Street space, it donated the 1920 warehouse to Grand Valley State University. In 1982, Grand Valley purchased the 1980 warehouse building, and used both buildings as part of a deal to acquire land construction of a downtown campus. The remaining buildings were vacant until 1986, when they were purchased by Grand River Interiors. All the complex buildings were purchased by Pinnacle Construction Group in 2022. Pinnacle plans to renovate the structures into apartments and offices.

== Description ==
The Clipper Belt Lacer Company Complex contains seven buildings on approximately 3.3 acres alongside the Grand River. Five buildings contribute to the historic character of the property: the machine shop (1912), the office building (1916), the boiler house (1917) the enclosed garage (1917) and the open parking garage (1920).

The office building, machine shop and boiler house are brick buildings with steel or concrete floors and roofs. The parking garages are built of wood framing with. The office building and machine shop are constructed in a typical "mill style," with vertically stacked windows with segmental arches.

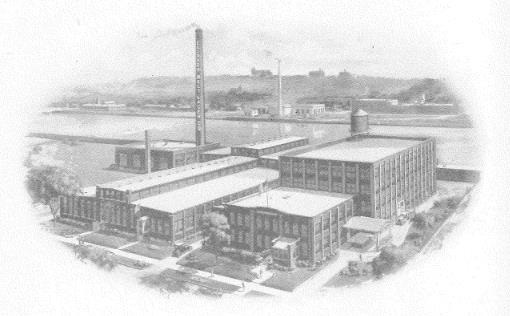
Clipper Belt Lacer Company Buildings in 1925
