= Grand Rapids Savings Bank Building =

- U.S. National Register of Historic Places
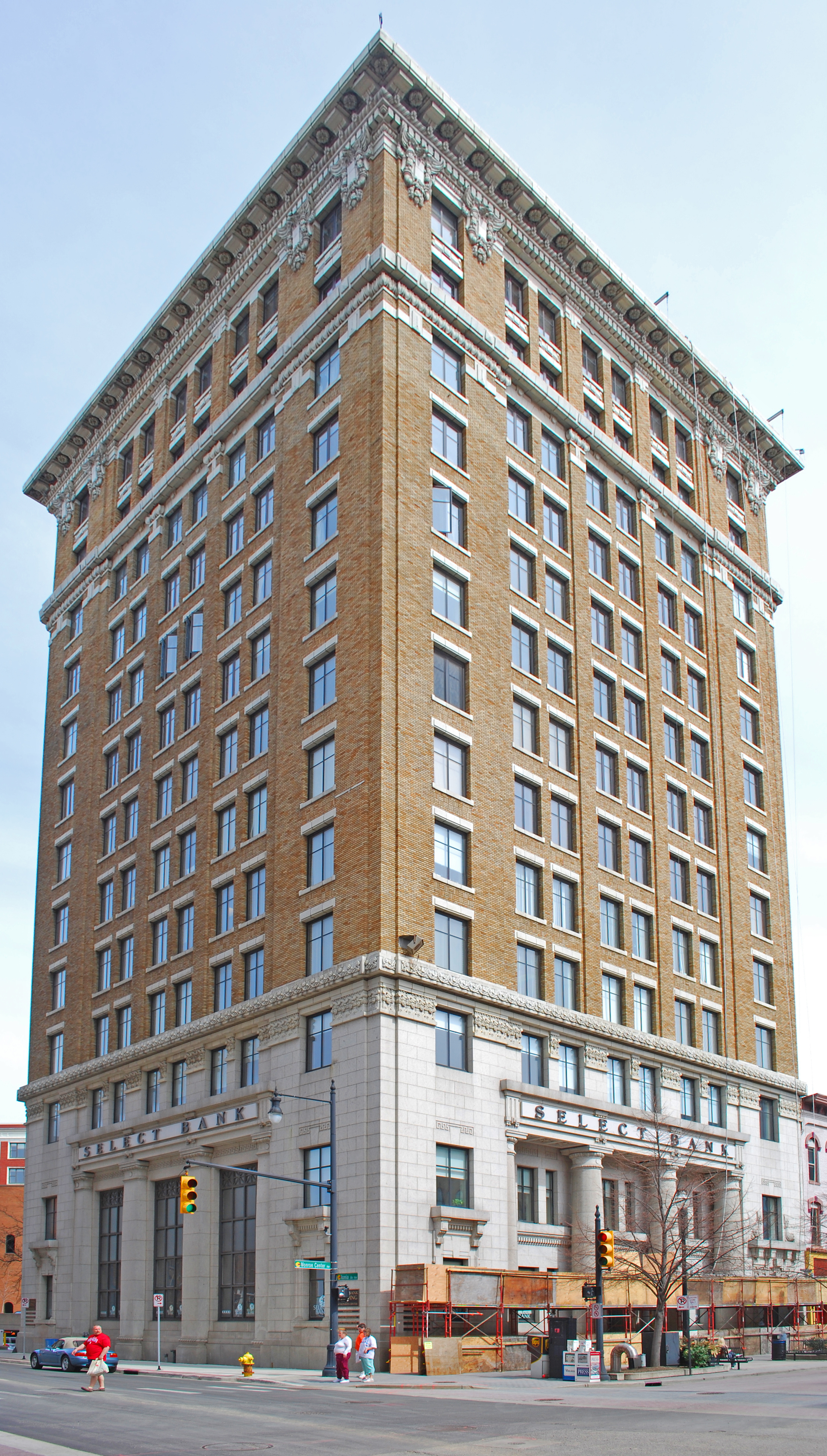

- Location within Michigan Location within the United States
- Interactive map
- Location: 60 Monroe Center, NW, Grand Rapids, Michigan
- Coordinates: 42°57′52″N 85°40′07″W
- Area: less than one acre
- Built: 1916
- Architect: Osgood & Osgood; Owen-Ames-Kimball
- Architectural style: Classical Revival, Beaux Arts
- NRHP reference No.: 90001956
- Added to NRHP: December 28, 1990

The Grand Rapids Savings Bank Building is an office building located at 60 Monroe Center, NW, in Grand Rapids, Michigan. It was listed on the National Register of Historic Places in 1990.

== History ==
Just before World War I, there was a boom in financial firms in downtown Grand Rapids. In 1916, the Grand Rapids Savings Bank constructed this building, designed by local architects Osgood & Osgood. It served as headquarters for the bank, with additional office space for tenants. Over its history, tenants included lumberman John W. Blodgett, Senator Arthur Vandenberg, and World War II correspondent Alfred D. Rathbone IV.

== Description ==
The Grand Rapids Savings Bank Building is a 13-story steel frame commercial tower with a mix of Classical Revival and Beaux Arts styling. The exterior is clad with pale grey granite at the first floor and mezzanine levels, topped with a cornice, and buff-colored brick on the upper stories. A large terra cotta cornice caps the building. The main elevation is five bays wide, with the three central bays containing a two-story recessed entrance framed by four Doric granite columns. On the upper floors, the three central bays contain paired windows, while the outer bays contain one.
