= John and Nellie Vander Jagt House =

- U.S. National Register of Historic Places
- Location within Michigan Location within the United States
- Interactive map
- Location: 2615 Plainfield Ave NE Grand Rapids, Michigan
- Coordinates: 43°00′39″N 85°38′55″W
- Built: 1940
- Built by: George Datema & Sons, George Den Hartog
- Architect: Wilfred McLaughlin
- Architectural style: Tudor Revival architecture
- NRHP reference No.: 100013324
- Added to NRHP: August 13, 2026

The John and Nellie Vander Jagt House is a former single family home located at 2615 Plainfield Ave NE in Grand Rapids, Michigan. It was listed on the National Register of Historic Places in 2026.

== History ==
John Vander Jagt married Nellie Dewinter in 1910. In 1923 the couple began construction on a house at 2442 Foster Avenue, and in 1924 John Vander Jagt founded the Reliable Cartage Company, which secured an exclusive contract with the Atlantic & Pacific Tea Company. Reliable Cartage quickly grew into one of the largest trucking companies in Michigan, and in 1935 nearly doubled in size after acquiring the Kentucky Transport Corporation. Around the same time, the Vander Jagts began planning a new, larger home on five contiguous lots. They hired local architect Wilfred McLaughlin to design the house, and construction began in early 1939. The house was competed in 1940.

Less than a year after moving into the house, John Vander Jagt suffered a heart attack, forcing him to retire from his business. In 1941, he was admitted to the hospital and died on October 5. Nellie Vander Jagt remained in the house until she too died in 1985. Afterward, Sidney and Betty Albrecht purchased the house and lived there until Betty died in 2020. By this time, the house required substantial renovation, and multiple developers proposed demolition. Instead, realtor Tammy Jo and Max Budzynski purchased the house in 2021, and have restored much of the property. The house was listed on the National Register of Historic Places in 2026.

== Description ==
The John and Nellie Vander Jagt House is a large, two-story high style Tudor Revival house with a steeply pitched roofline. It is set on a large lot, and is unique in the surrounding neighborhood due to its large size and substantial setback from the street. The front of the house mixes stone, brick, and half-timbered stucco, while to roof is covered with variegated slate. The front facade is asymmetric, with front gabled dormers projecting from the roof. The front door is set within an ornately carved stone archway.
