= Old Grand Rapids Christian High School =

- Grand Rapids Christian High School
- U.S. National Register of Historic Places
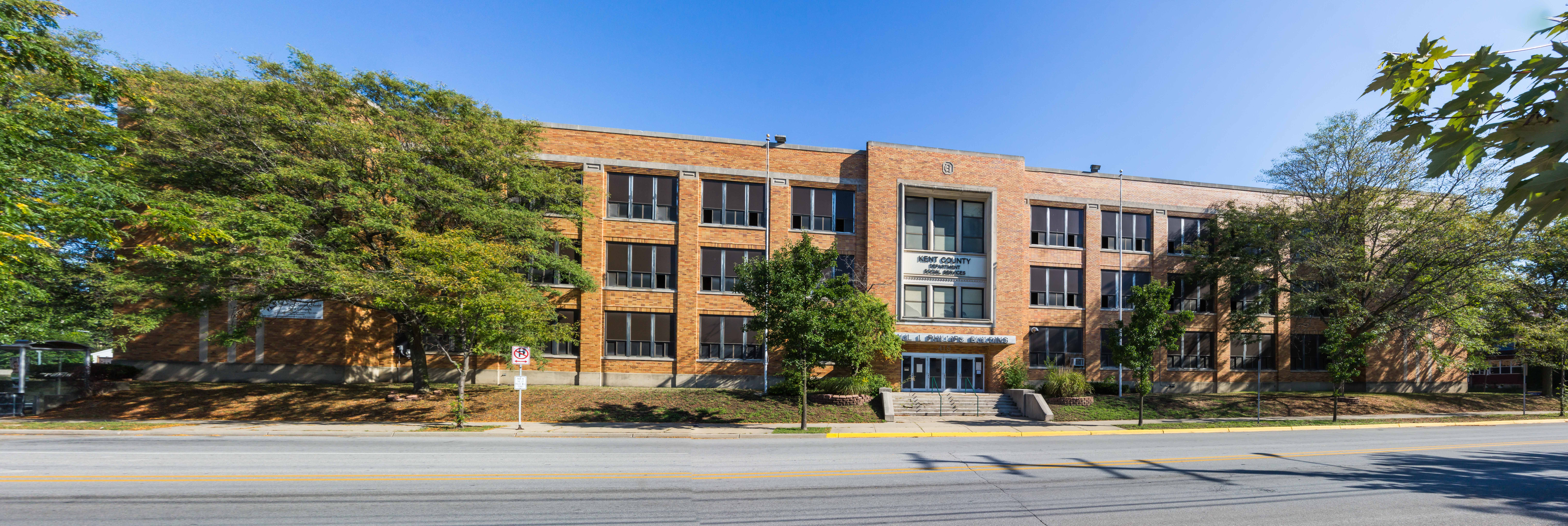
- Interactive map
- Location: 415 Franklin St., SE, Grand Rapids, Michigan
- Coordinates: 42°56′55″N 85°39′31″W
- Area: 0 acres (0 ha)
- Built: 1920
- NRHP reference No.: 100002712
- Added to NRHP: July 25, 2018

The Old Grand Rapids Christian High School is a former private school building located at 415 Franklin Street SE in Grand Rapids, Michigan. The building was the original site of Grand Rapids Christian High School, which constructed the building in 1930. It was listed on the National Register of Historic Places in 2018. The building has been rehabilitated into a community and religious center known as 415 Franklin.

== History ==
The site where the building now stands was the original home, in the 1890s, of Calvin Seminary and its junior college, the Holland Theology School. In 1920, the Grand Rapids Christian High School was established and purchased the property. In 1930, they constructed a new building for their high school. The school opened with 260 students, which increased to over 1000 students in 1950. In 1964, the continued growth led the school to divide into two campuses; however, the increase was not sustainable, and the schools recombined in 1972. Grand Rapids Christian High sold the 415 Franklin campus to Kent County, needing only one building.

The Kent County Department of Social Services used the building until 2009, when it was sold to local developer Ed DeVries (also a Grand Rapids Central Christian alumnus). Soon after, Madison Church: Ford Campus began discussing using the chapel within the building. In 2015, DeVries Companies gave the building to Madison Church. The church partnered with the Inner-City Christian Federation and the Refugee Education Center to rehabilitate the school building into a community and church space, and provide housing on the upper floors. In 2021, the rehabilitated building was opened.

== Description ==
The Old Grand Rapids Christian High School is a three-story brick building. The building contains 75,000 square feet of space. It houses 40 affordable apartments, the administrative offices for Inner City Christian Federation, space for the Franklin campus of the Madison Church, and a YMCA child development center. Some of the historic features of the original building have been repurposed. The ornate pillars and trim of the high school chapel are part of Madison Church’s sanctuary, and the classroom chalkboards have been used for the early childhood center.
