= Auburn Hills Historic District =

- U.S. National Register of Historic Places
- U.S. Historic district
- Location within Michigan
- Interactive map
- Location: Auburn Avenue NE, Dale Court NE, Drexel Court NE, Palmer Court NE, Travis Street NE, and 1301 Sweet Street NE, Grand Rapids, Michigan
- Coordinates: 42°59′37″N 85°38′20″W
- Area: 20 acres (8.1 ha)
- Built: 1964
- Built by: Robert Mast, R. D. Brooks, W & R Builders, Grand Rapids Home Builders Association
- Architectural style: Modern, Ranch
- NRHP reference No.: 100012128
- Added to NRHP: August 14, 2025

The Auburn Hills Historic District is a residential historic district in Grand Rapids, Michigan located along Auburn Avenue NE, Dale Court NE, Drexel Court NE, Palmer Court NE, Travis Street NE, and Sweet Street NE. The district was listed on the National Register of Historic Places in 2025. It is significant as a neighborhood developed by and for African Americans at a time when redlining still enforced segregated housing.

== History ==
In the late 1950s, African American residents in Grand Rapids were concentrated in urban areas southeast of downtown. As the population grew, there was a pent-up demand for housing that was not fulfilled due to the redlining practices of the day. In 1962–63, four black residents of Grand Rapids - Dr. Julius Franks Jr., J. E. Adams, Joseph W. Lee, and Samuel Triplett - formed the Auburn Hills Land Development Corporation and purchased a 20-acre parcel of land on the northwest side of the city. After overcoming racially motivated pushback from some members of the community, the parcel was platted in 1964. Lots were sold and construction began in the summer, and the first house in the neighborhood was completed in December 1964. By 1967, seventeen houses were built, and the majority of the lots were built out by 1974. In 1983, 46 houses total had been completed, with 15 lost still undeveloped. More houses were added in the 1980s and 1990s, with the last two constructed in 2001.

== Description ==
The Auburn Hills Historic District is a rectangular residential development with mature trees and sidewalks. There are 56 houses and duplexes in the district, with 37 constructed before 1974 and the remaining 19 constructed between 1984 and 2001. Houses are a mix of ranch, tri-level, or conventional two-story designs, and are typically clad with brick or wood siding. Most have attached garages.
