= Irving Andrew and Olive Crane Kendall Dean House =

- Irving Andrew and Olive Crane Dean Kendall House
- U.S. National Register of Historic Places
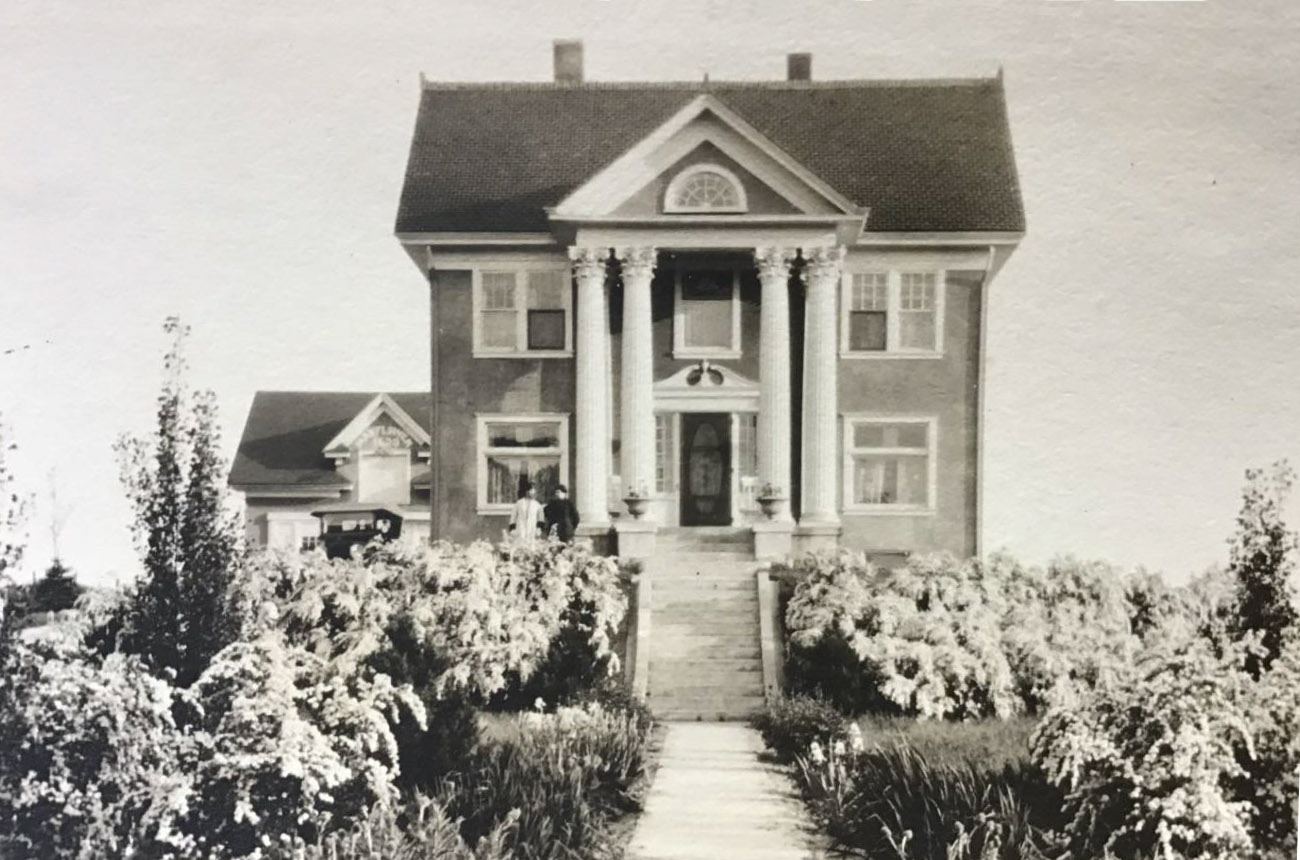
- Irving Andrew and Olive Crane Kendall Dean House in 1915

- Location within Michigan Location within the United States
- Interactive map
- Location: 2350 Leonard St, NW Grand Rapids, Michigan
- Coordinates: 42°59′8″N 85°43′35″W
- Built: 1911
- Architect: Frank P. Allen & Son
- Architectural style: Classical Revival
- NRHP reference No.: 100009174
- Added to NRHP: July 20, 2023

The Irving Andrew and Olive Crane Kendall Dean House, also known as Mayflower Place, is a single family home located at 2350 Leonard Street NW in Grand Rapids, Michigan, United States. It was listed on the National Register of Historic Places in 2023.

== History ==
Olive Crane Kendall married Irving Andrew Dean in Grand Rapids on June 21, 1883. Irving worked as an accountant at Grand Rapids and Indiana Railroad until he opened his own accounting firm in 1908. Olive came from a family of furniture makers and was an active member of the Daughters of the American Revolution. In 1910, Olive's brother died, leaving half his estate to his sister. In 1911 the Deans hired architect Frank P. Allen to design this house. They lived here until Irving died in 1927 and Olive in 1929.

The couple did not have any children, and after Olive's death, here estate sold the house to Leonard J. Ritzema owner of the Ritzema Department Store. Ritzema later sold the house to Kenneth Burgett, owner of Burgett's Floral, a plant nursery and florist shop. Subsequent ownership is not clear, but by 1993 Edward Nedwick and Dr. Lawrence Pawl owned the house. In 2002 Pawl and his wife purchased the home outright, and the house was purchased by Frank and Melissa Patis in 2018, the current owners. They initiated the National Register nomination and hired local historians to research the home and write the nomination.

== Description ==
The Irving Andrew and Olive Crane Kendall Dean House is a two-and-one-half-story Classical Revival wood-frame house clad in stucco. The footprint of the house is primarily rectangular but with a two-story gabled projection at one corner. The roof is covered with asphalt shingles and the foundation is constructed of concrete topped with fieldstone. The front elevation includes a central portico with fluted two-story Corinthian columns. A low hipped roof is above. The windows are arranged symmetrically around the portico. A two-car garage of similar design sits behind the house.
