= Marywood Academy (Grand Rapids) =

- Sisters of the Order of Saint Dominic Motherhouse Complex
- U.S. National Register of Historic Places
- U.S. Historic district
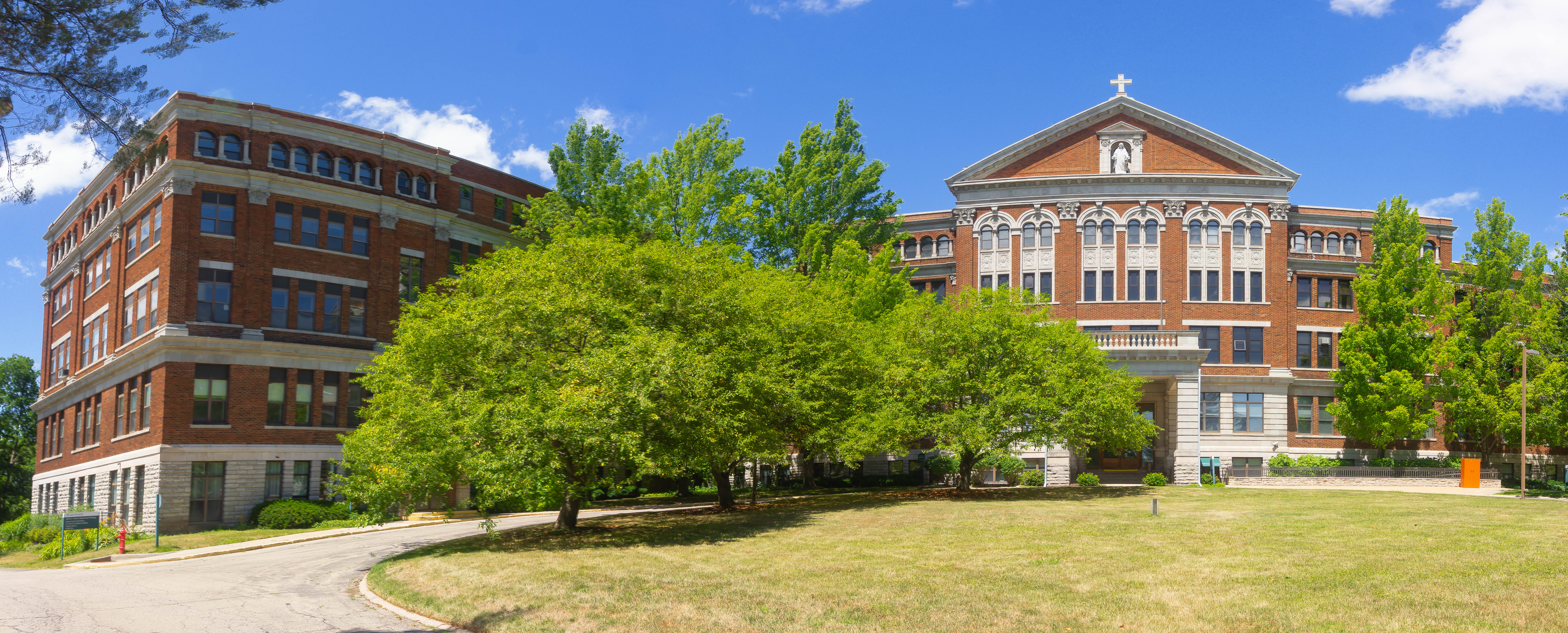
- Marywood Academy in 2022

- Location within Michigan Location within the United States
- Interactive map
- Location: 2025 Fulton St. E. Grand Rapids, Michigan
- Coordinates: 42°57′55″N 85°37′10″W
- Built: 1921
- Built by: John McNabb & Son
- Architect: E. Brielmaier & Sons
- Architectural style: Italian Renaissance, Neoclassical Revival
- NRHP reference No.: 100007588
- Added to NRHP: April 6, 2022

Marywood Academy, also known as the Sisters of the Order of Saint Dominic Motherhouse Complex, is a complex of religious and educational buildings located at 2025 Fulton Street East in Grand Rapids, Michigan. It was listed on the National Register of Historic Places in 2022.

== History ==
The Sisters of the Order of Saint Dominic arrived in Grand Rapids in 1899, and operated a home for orphans. In 1900, they opened Sacred Heart Academy for girls in a private home near the downtown. Enrollment bloomed at the academy, and by 1913 the order realized it needed more space. In 1917, the land for the current complex was purchased, and in 1918 the Order met with the architectural firm of E. Brielmaier & Sons to discuss plans for a new building. In 1919 they contracted the firm John McNabb & Son to construct the new building; excavation began that year and the building's cornerstone was laid in June 1921. The academy opened in September 1922.

In 1925, the school changed its name to Marywood Academy. Over the next few decades, enrollment grew at the school, with a high point reached in the 1950s of around 330 students. A separate hall was built in 1953 and another wing was added to the building in 1954. However, after that enrollment began to steadily decline; in 1971 the Academy opened to boys in the younger grades. Even so, in 1974 enrolment in the academy's high school was only 84 students. The high school closed in 1974, and the elementary school in 1989. Some sisters continued to live in the complex, operating a day care and health center.

In 2020, the Dominican Sisters decided to redevelop the campus to provide affordable housing for senior citizens. In 2022 the remaining sisters moved out.

== Description ==
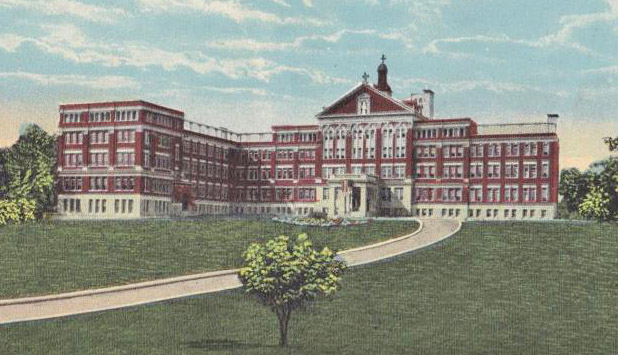
Marywood Academy (then Sacred Heart Academy) c. 1925

Sisters of the Order of Saint Dominic Motherhouse Complex contains six buildings. The oldest and most significant structure is the 1921 Motherhouse. The Motherhouse is a four-story U-shaped Neoclassical building with Italian Renaissance detailing. The front facade has a central bay featuring a limestone columned porte-cochere leading to the main doors. The windows are arranged in multiples of two, three, four or five. The Italian Renaissance detailing includes limestone cornices, composite column capitals, flat lintels, spandrels with carved rosettes, arcaded window divisions, rounded arches, and decorative central keystones.
