= Saint Joseph Seminary (Grand Rapids, Michigan) =

- U.S. National Register of Historic Places
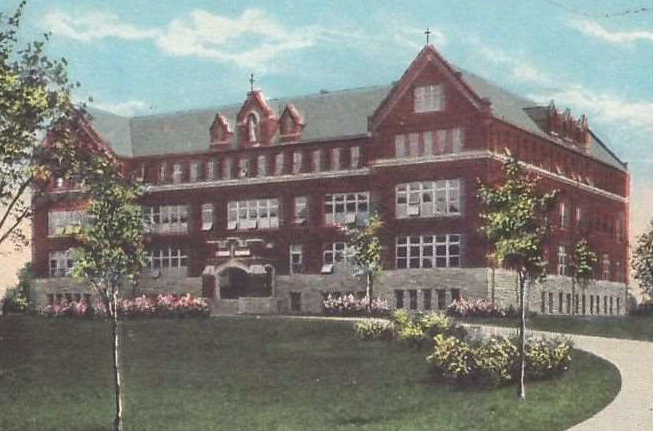

- Location within Michigan Location within the United States
- Interactive map
- Location: 600 Burton St. SE Grand Rapids, Michigan
- Coordinates: 42°55′39″N 85°39′5″W
- Area: 17 acres (6.9 ha)
- Built: 1919
- Architect: Spier & Gehrke, Humbrecht & Associates
- Architectural style: Late Gothic Revival, Modern
- NRHP reference No.: 100004384
- Added to NRHP: September 16, 2019

The Saint Joseph Seminary is a former Roman Catholic seminary building located at 600 Burton Street SE in Grand Rapids, Michigan. It was listed on the National Register of Historic Places in 2019.

== History ==
In 1906, Henry Richter, bishop of the Diocese of Grand Rapids, recruited Monsignor Anthony Volkert to develop a seminary program. In 1909, the diocese purchased a building in Grand Rapids and opened Saint Joseph's Minor Seminary, educating high school- and college-age boys. The seminary proved a success, and a new four-story brick building was constructed in 1910 to house the program. The building was enlarged in 1913, but still proved too small to house all students. In 1919, the diocese purchased property on Burton Street, in what was still a rural area, to construct a new building.

Construction started in 1919, and the building was completed at the end of 1920, with enough room to house 100 students, as well as convent room for the Sisters of Mercy, who provided food and infirmary services. However, enrollment steadily increased, and by the late 1920s, there were again more students than the school had room for. Alterations were made in 1933 to provide more room, and again in 1943. In 1944, a separate convent was constructed for the sisters, and in 1946 the attic was furnished. By 1955, over 200 students were at the school, and in 1956 ground was broken for a new building, Saint Henry Hall. Further additions were made in 1957 and 1958.

However, enrollment began declining in the 1960s. The college students began taking classes at nearby Aquinas College, and Saint Joseph became a high school-only institution. By 1968, student enrollment was below 100. In the 1970s, the high school students began taking their classes at the nearby Catholic Central High School, and much of Saint Joseph was converted to office space. In 1981, the school closed for good. The diocese continued to use the main building for offices and a conference center. In 2008, the diocese sold the property to the Lighthouse Full Life Center Church. It was used from 2013 to 2017 by Grand Rapids Ellington Academy of Arts and Technology, a K–12 charter school. As of 2018, the property was being considered for redevelopment.

== Description ==
Saint Joseph's Seminary is located on a 17-acre campus containing four buildings. The oldest, the Main Building, is a three-story, E-shaped brick Late Gothic Revival structure on a raised basement with a tall cross gable roof. A wide porch runs to the entrance, above which is a group of five one-over-one windows with transoms, and a gable dormer above that. On each end of the building, wings project forward. The building has stone sills and other decorative elements.

Other buildings on the campus include the 1944 convent, the 1955 Activities Building, and the 1956 Saint Henry Hall. The convent is two-story flat roof brick building with limestone sills and decorative elements. The Activities Building is a two-story red brick building with a single-story ell. Saint Henry Hall is a three-story flat roof brick building with a projecting stain tower.
