= Mangiamo =

- Augustus Paddock House
- U.S. National Register of Historic Places
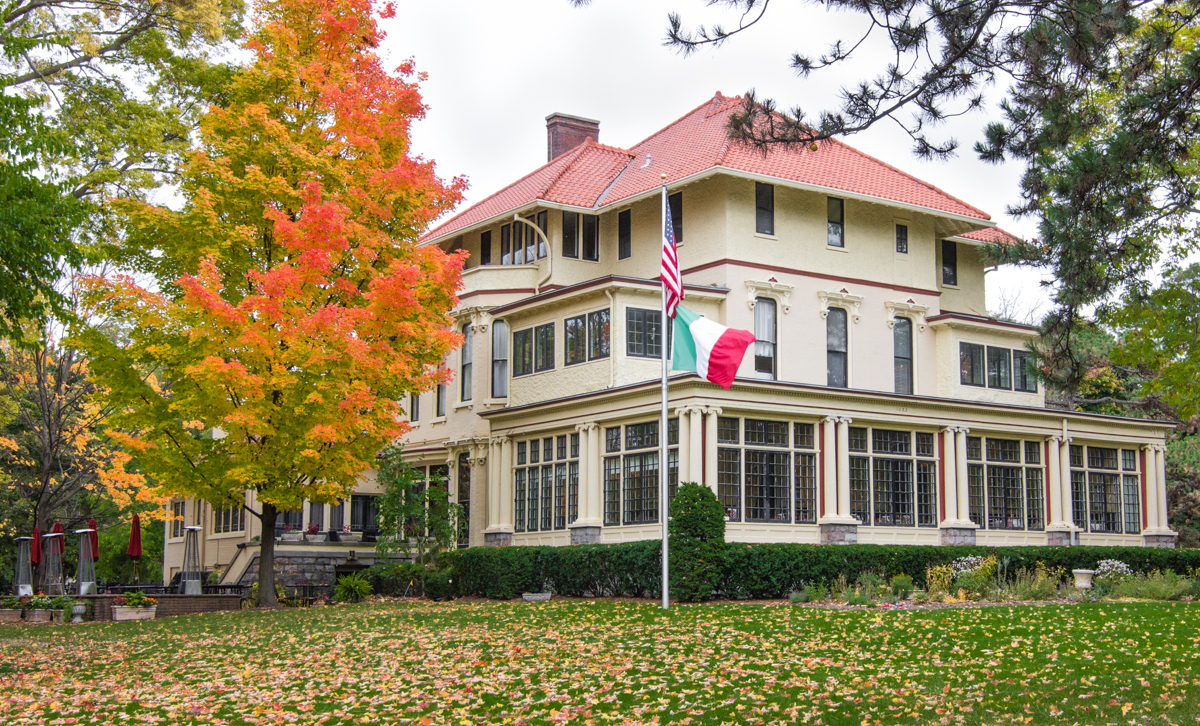

- Location within Michigan Location within the United States
- Interactive map
- Location: 1033 Lake Dr., SE, Grand Rapids, Michigan
- Coordinates: 42°57′36″N 85°38′34″W
- Area: 3 acres (1.2 ha)
- Built: 1873
- Architect: Robinson & Campau
- Architectural style: Classical Revival, Italianate
- NRHP reference No.: 85002154
- Added to NRHP: September 12, 1985

Mangiamo, also known as the Augustus Paddock House, is located at 1033 Lake Drive SE in Grand Rapids, Michigan. It was built as a single-family home and later converted into a banquet and event facility. It was listed on the National Register of Historic Places in 1985.

== History ==
Augustus Paddock was born in New York state, and later came to Michigan. He worked on a steamboat on the Grand River, and by 1865 was the manager of the Newaygo Company, a lumbering firm that established the village of Newaygo, Michigan. He became a partner in 1867. In 1872, Paddock purchased the land where Paddock Place now stands. The land had previously been owned by horticulturist Truman Kellogg, who in 1837 began cultivating apples, peaches, plums, and grapes in the area. Paddock built this house on the land in 1873 or 1874. Paddock lived there only a few years, eventually moving to Colorado. In 1879, he sold the house to Sarah Doubleday, who in turn sold it to prominent local physician Alban Botsford in 1881. It was sold again in 1884 to lumberman James M. Lane, and in 1890 to Samuel Scudder.

In 1892, Melvin J. Clark and his wife, Emily, acquired the property as their residence. Clark was born in Canada and later came to Michigan, operating a shingle business, a sawmill, and later a wholesale grocery business. He was also involved in several lumber and mining companies and was a director of the Grand Rapids National Bank. The Clarks were also involved in many charitable activities, including establishing the Clark Memorial Home, the Clark Memorial Church, and helping establish the Children's Home Society. Melvin Clark died in 1909, and Emily Clark remained in the house. She made substantial additions to the building in the early 1910s, engaging architects Robinson & Campau to remodel and add a third story. She also continued to make philanthropic gifts, including funding a substantial portion of the Grand Rapids Art Museum. On her death in 1924, she willed her art collection to the museum.

In the 1910s, the Clarks' daughter, Marguerite Clark Wurzburg and her husband Edmund Wurzburg, owner of the Wurzburg Department Store, moved into the Clark house with Emily. Edmund died in 1928, and Marguerite remained in the house until 1935. In 1941, the house was sold to the Franciscans, who refurbished the house and opened St. Bernadine's Friary.

In 1983, the house was transformed into Gibson's Restaurant. The restaurant closed in 2005 and the house was sold to Greg Gilmore, who reopened it later that year as Mangiamo. Mangiamo closed in 2017, and the house became an events venue, Paddock Place.. In early 2024, the property reopened as Mangiamo, a fine-dining Italian restaurant. The redevelopment also included the opening of MO’s Cocktails, a speakeasy-style cocktail bar in the building’s basement.

== Description ==
Mangiamo is a 17,000 square foot structure with 17 rooms. The original house, constructed in 1873, is a two-story, brick veneer, Italianate structure. In 1910 and 1914, a third story with a tile roof was added, and the house was otherwise enlarged and remodeled. The house sits on a five-foot foundation of coursed gray and red cut granite. The first and second floors are faced in brick, while the third is covered with stucco. A wrap-around porch runs across the entire front facade and onto both sides. The lower floors contain round-corner windows with Eastlake rood moldings, as well as bay windows. The roof has projecting eaves, and is covered with red terra cotta tiles.
