= Steelcase Plants No. 2 and 3 =

- Metal Office Furniture Company (Steelcase) Plants No. 2 and 3
- U.S. National Register of Historic Places
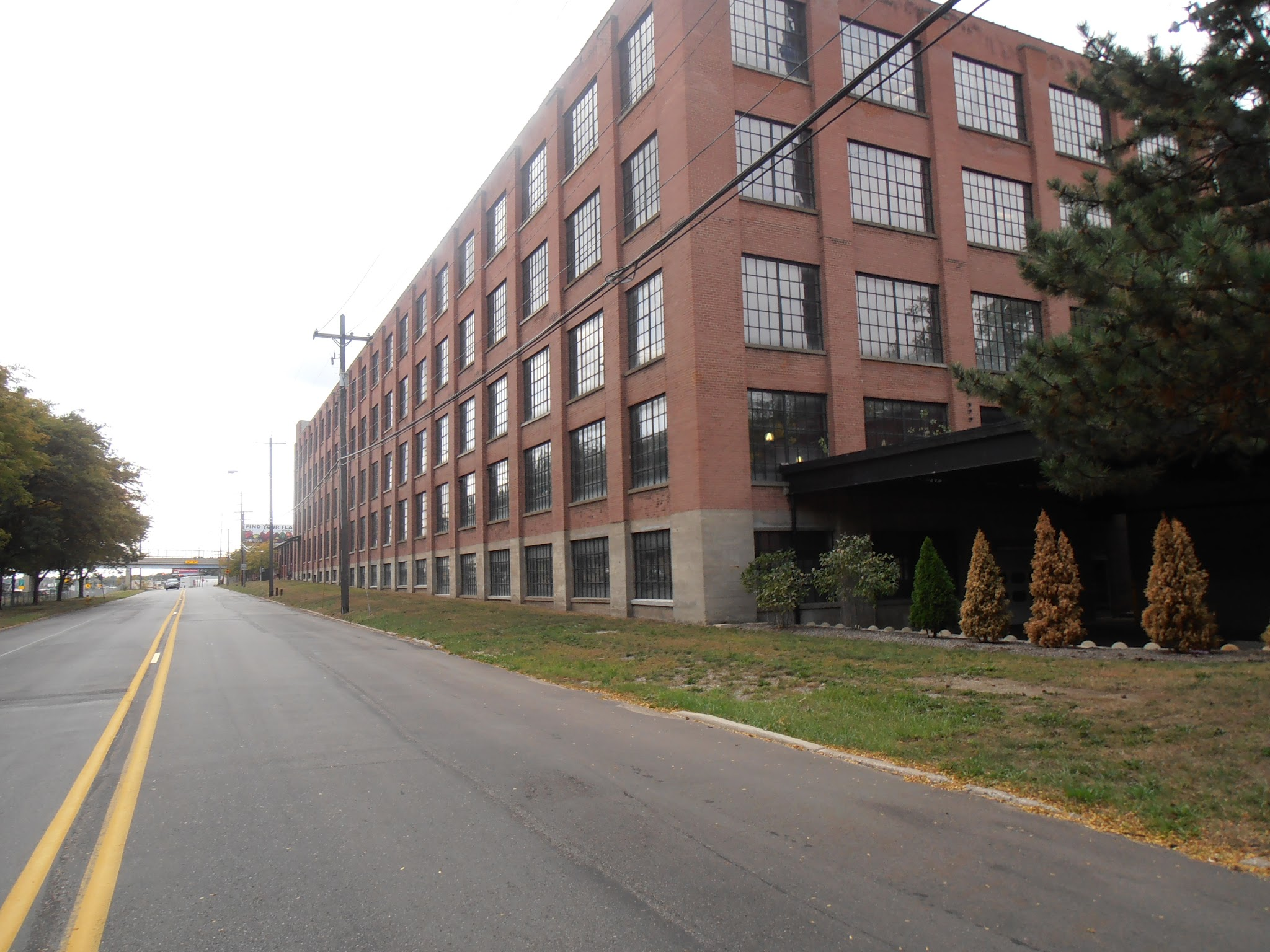

- Location within Michigan Location within the United States
- Interactive map
- Location: 401 Hall St. SW, Grand Rapids, Michigan
- Coordinates: 42°56′34″N 85°40′41″W
- Built: 1908
- Architect: Hauser-Owen-Ames
- Architectural style: Early Commercial
- NRHP reference No.: 04000691
- Added to NRHP: July 17, 2004

The Metal Office Furniture Company (Steelcase) Plants No. 2 and 3 are historic manufacturing plants located at 401 Hall Street SW in Grand Rapids, Michigan.

== History ==
Grand Rapids had a history of furniture manufacturing. One such company was the Terrell Manufacturing Company, which was organized in 1908 to produce metal storage cabinets, shelving and lockers. Terrell constructed their plant on Hall Street, and began producing furniture in 1908. Another company, The Metal Office Furniture Company, was organized in 1912 to supply metal office furniture to the Fred Macey Furniture Company, a mail-order firm. The Metal Office Furniture Company constructed a plant on South Division (plant no. 1) and began producing in 1912. In 1918, Metal Office Furniture ended its agreement with Macey and entered into a partnership with Terrell. By the 1920s, both companies were doing well, and in 1925 Metal Office Furniture began building a new plant for the production of desks and tables connected to the Terrell plant. The new building became Metal Office Furniture Plant No. 2. In 1930, the building was expanded by adding two-floors to the top. That same year, Metal Office Furniture and Terrell formally merged, and the 1908 Terrell plant became Metal Office Furniture Company Plant No. 3.

Metal Office Furniture lasted through the Great Depression, and continued making furniture after World War II. In 1954, they changed their name to Steelcase, reflecting a popular tradename used by the company. The next year, they began building a new plant on a larger plot of land, and in 1958, the operations in Plants No. 2 and 3 were transferred to the new facility. Steelcase Plants No. 2 and 3 remained vacant for two years, and were sold in 1960. Since that time, they have been used by small manufacturers and for storage.

== Description ==
The Steelcase Plants No. 2 and 3 complex contains four buildings: a single-story brick factory building with a monitor roof constructed in 1908, a four-story brick industrial loft-type factory building constructed between 1926 and 1930, a brick power plant also constructed in 1926, and a single-story concrete block building constructed in 1953.

The single-story 1908 factory, designated Plant No. 3, is a brick structure 23 bays long with a monitor roof running the full length of the building. Each bays contains three nine-over-nine double hung windows, and is separated from neighboring bays by brick piers. The 1926/1930 factory is a large, flat-roof, brick structure that is 21 bays long and eight bays wide. The bays on the long sides are separated by brick piers with concrete caps. The bays contain steel multi-pane windows.
