= Heartside =

- Heartside Historic District
- U.S. National Register of Historic Places
- U.S. Historic district
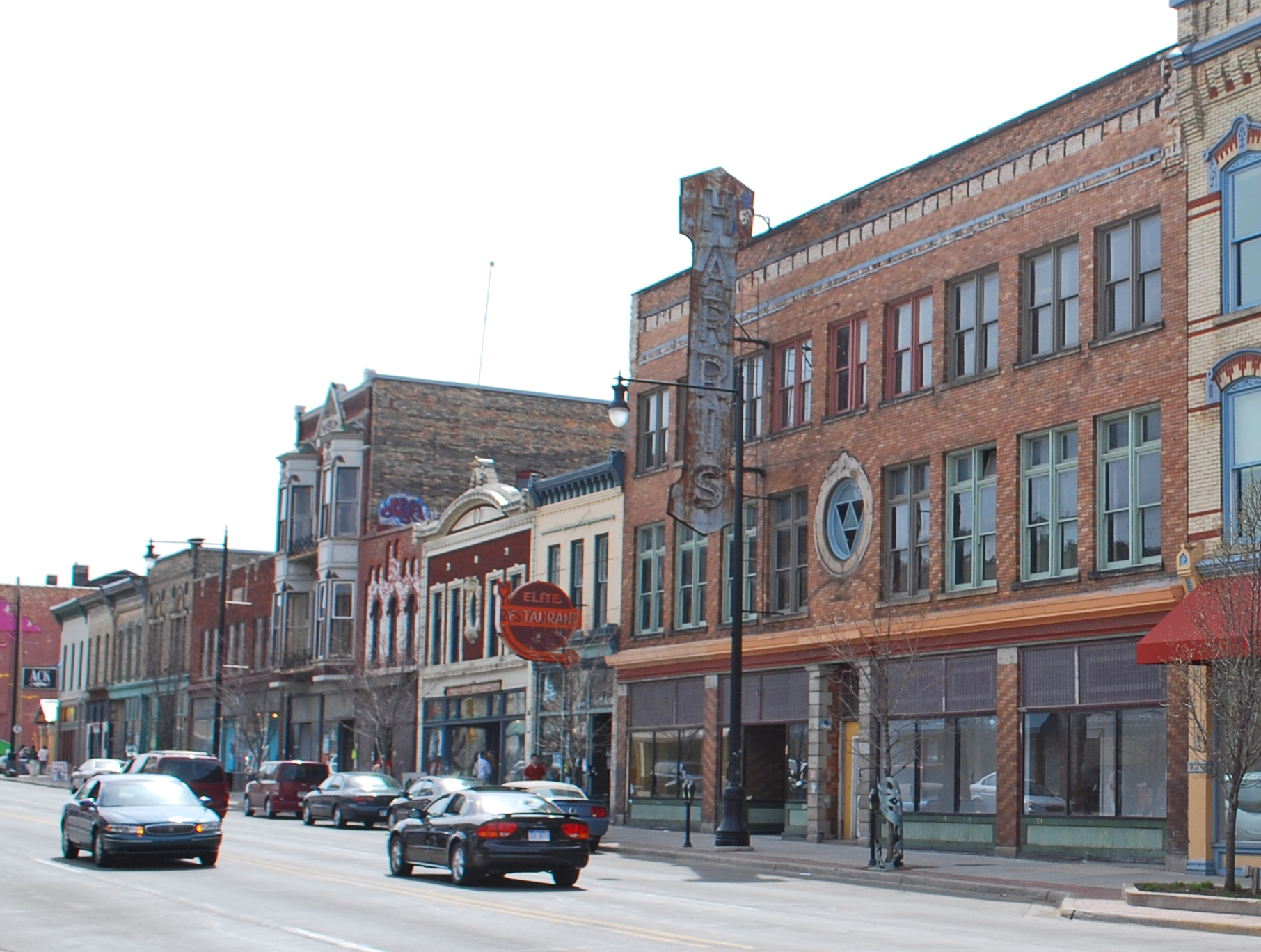

- Location within Michigan Location within the United States
- Interactive map showing the location for Heartside
- Location: Roughly bounded by Division and Ionia Aves and Cherry and Louis Sts., Grand Rapids, Michigan
- Coordinates: 42°57′42″N 85°40′09″W
- Architectural style: Late Victorian, Commercial Italianate, and Richardsonian Romanesque
- NRHP reference No.: 82002844 (original); 100007933 (increase)

Significant dates
- Added to NRHP: March 2, 1982
- Boundary increase: July 11, 2022

Heartside is a neighborhood located near downtown Grand Rapids, Michigan. Heartside district is a developing area in the city known for its art. It has restaurants, a park with a playground and splash-pad, and a recently opened farmer's market. However, it also has experienced much urban decay, features numerous abandoned buildings, and contains a large presence of homelessness.

== History ==
Heartside was originally a marshy area near the Grand River. In about the 1850s, as Grand Rapids grew larger, Heartside became a shanty town, populated by recent immigrants, particularly Irish. By the 1870s, the area had developed into a compact neighborhood containing small one and two-story clapboard houses. In 1870, the Grand Rapids and Indiana Railroad ran a line through Heartside, and constructed a station at what is now Ionia Avenue and Oakes Street. The railroad, and the easy accessibility of transportation, led to a rapid growth of the region north of Grand Rapids and commercial and industrial development in Heartside. By 1900, Heartside was heavily built up with wholesale and manufacturing buildings, as well as stores and apartment buildings, hotels, and a new Union Depot.

== Heartside Historic District ==
The Heartside Historic District is a smaller section of the larger Heartside neighborhood, containing many of the historically significant buildings. The historic district consists of six full blocks and parts of two others, containing structures located along Ionia, Commerce, and Division Avenues, from Cherry Street on the south to Fulton and Louis Street on the north. The district contains 62 buildings, of which 55 are historically significant. The buildings are constructed of brick or, in some cases, sandstone, and are primarily two to six stories tall. All but fifteen were constructed before 1929, and are predominantly Italianate, Late Victorian, Richardsonian Romanesque, and early twentieth-century commercial in style. The district was increased in size in 2022.
