= American Box Board Company Headquarters and Factory =

- U.S. National Register of Historic Places
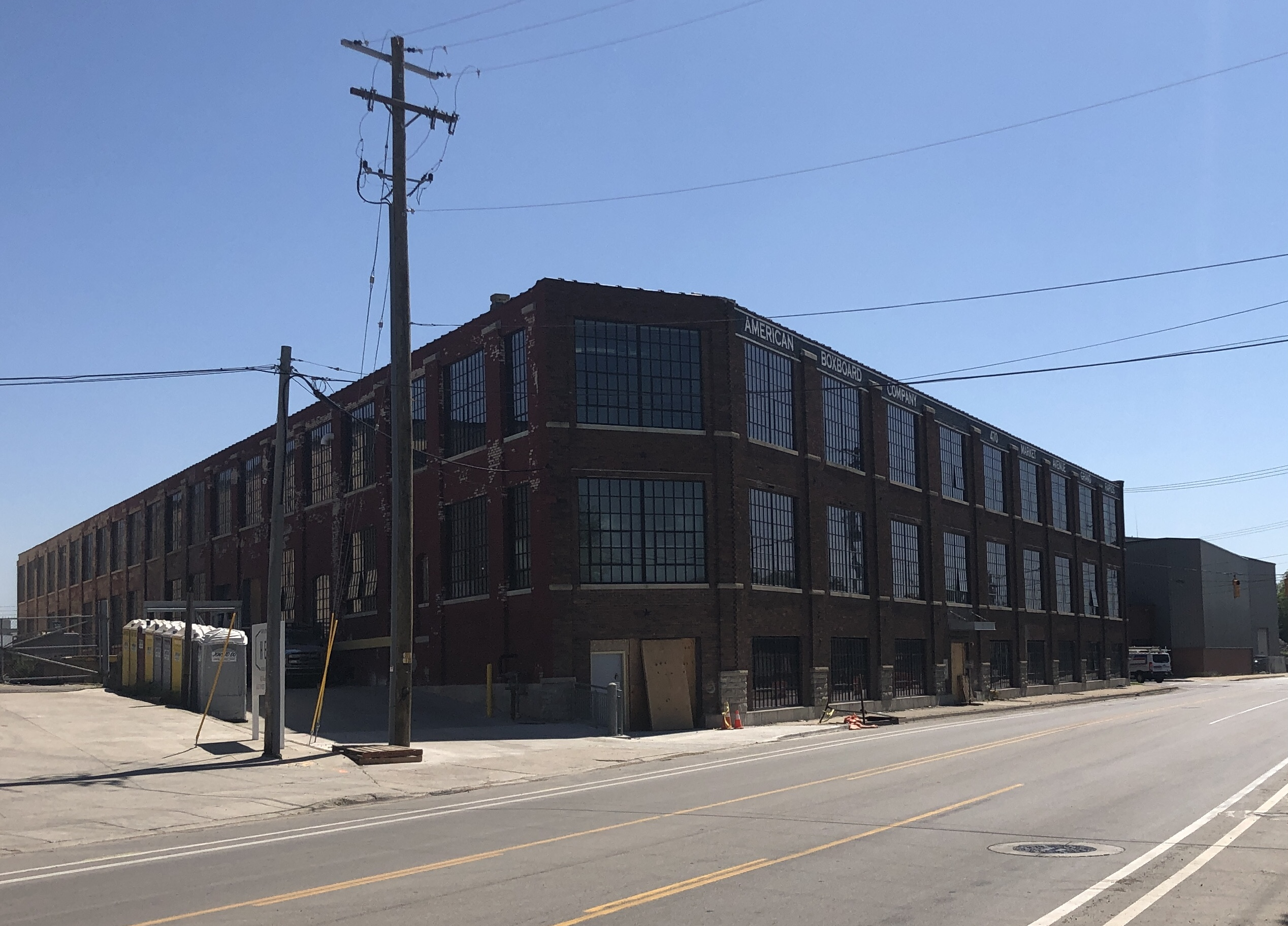
- Building in 2022
- Interactive map
- Location: 470 Market Ave. SW Grand Rapids, Michigan
- Coordinates: 42°57′17″N 85°40′56″W
- Area: 2.24 acres (0.91 ha)
- Built: 1912
- Built by: Horner & Kelly
- NRHP reference No.: 100005823
- Added to NRHP: November 24, 2020

The American Box Board Company Headquarters and Factory is a former factory building located at 470 Market Avenue SW in Grand Rapids, Michigan. It was listed on the National Register of Historic Places in 2020.

== History ==
The American Paper Box Company was organized in 1903 by a group of businessmen from Grand Rapids. The company operated for a few years from a building on Ionia Street, then moved to a larger building on Summer Avenue, west of the Grand River, in 1907. In 1910, the American Paper Box Company created an associate company, the American Box Board Company, which began operations as a paper mill in a factory at the southwest corner of Godfrey and Market Avenues. They also created another subsidiary, the American Corrugating Company.

In 1914, American Paper Box merged with its subsidiaries and re-incorporated as the American Box Board Company. The company also purchased the Illinois-Michigan Fibre Box Company, and relocated its operations from Battle Creek to Grand Rapids. With the large number of operations under its roof, the American Box Board Company decided to construct a new headquarters and box factory next to their Godfrey Avenue paper mill. They purchased the property, constructed a new building, and moved all their operations in 1914. The new building had both factory space for all divisions and office space for the corporation. By 1917, the American Box Board Company was the second-largest industry in Grand Rapids.

The company continued operations during the Great Depression, employing about 550 people in Grand Rapids and 2500 people total in the US. After World War II, the company developed new methods to process trees previously considered unsuitable for usage, and began expanding their Michigan operations. In 1947, they purchased a plant in Filer City, near Manistee and in 1951, they built a new $2,000,000 plant was completed in Grandville, near Grand Rapids.

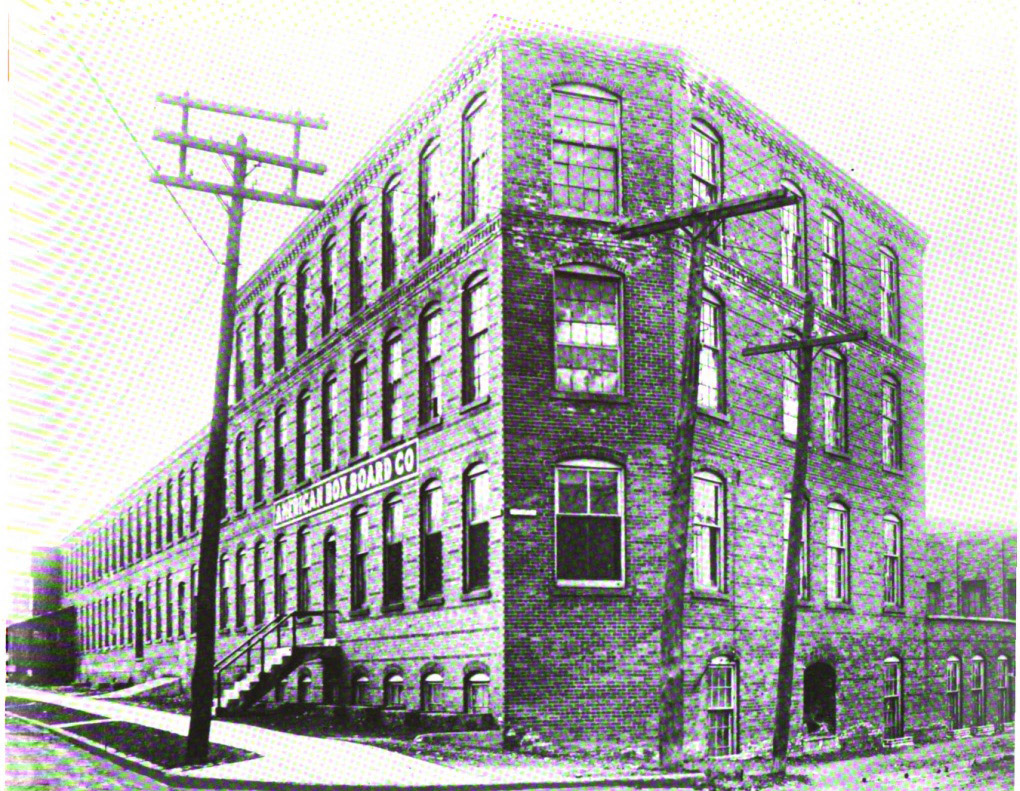
American Box Board Company building in 1953

In 1959, the American Box Board Company merged with two other companies to form the Packaging Corporation of America. The company used the building on Market Avenue SW continued for manufacturing until about 1979. As or 2020, a developer purchased the building and plans to convert it into housing.

== Description ==
The American Box Board Headquarters and Factory is a two-story structure with a basement, sitting on a trapezoidal footprint of about 1.8 acres (0.73 ha). The building is constructed of brick on a concrete foundation. On the main facades fronting Market Avenue SW and Godfrey Avenue SW the bricks are variegated red and brown, while on the other two sides the walls are painted common brick. It has a flat roof surrounded by a parapet lined with terra cotta coping tiles. The building has a regular window placement on both floors.

The main facade is approximately 200 feet long and is divided into ten bays divided by raised brick piers running up to the parapet. Window openings in each bay have stone sills. A door is in the fifth bay.
