= Ledyard Block Historic District =

- U.S. National Register of Historic Places
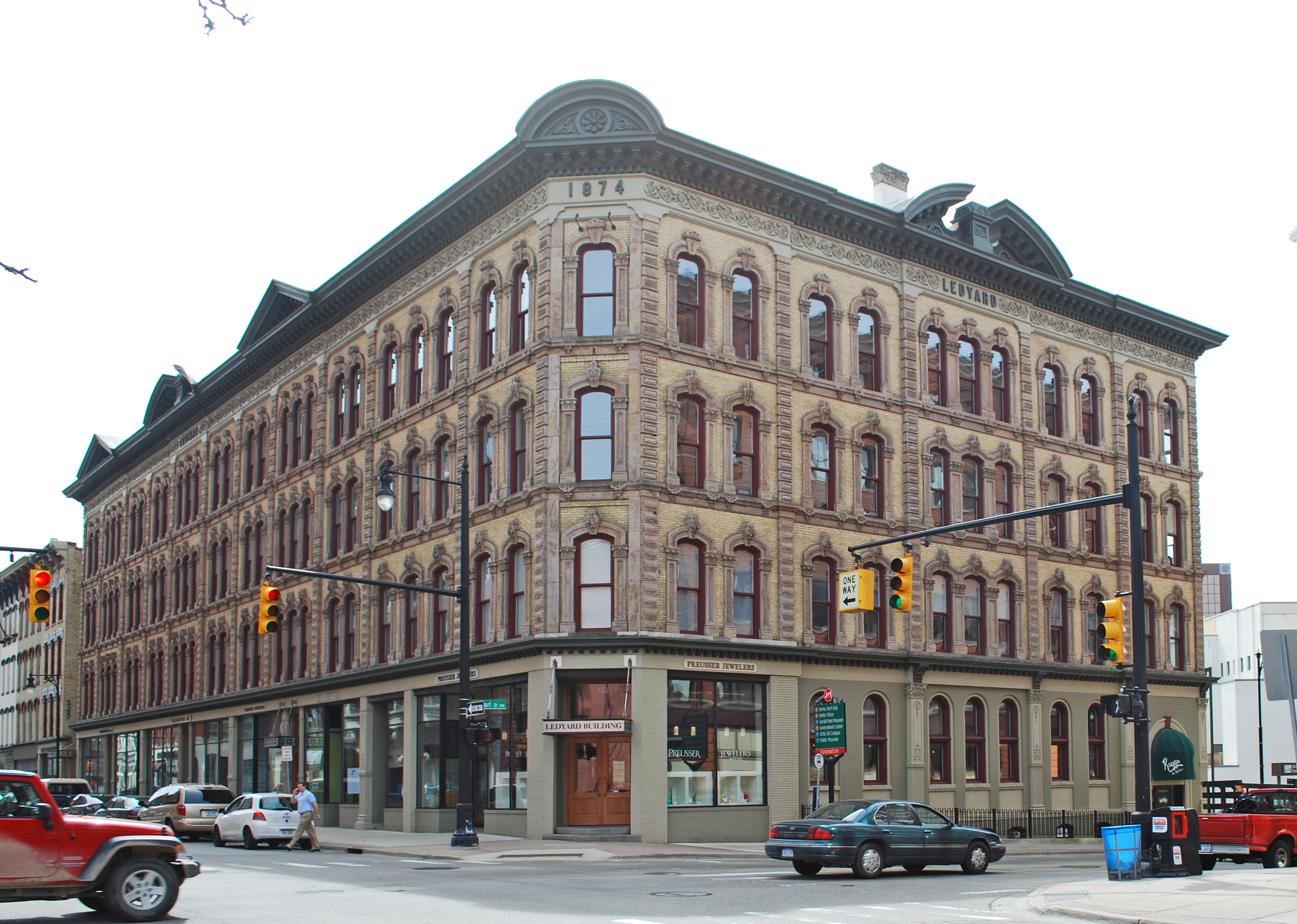

- Location within Michigan Location within the United States
- Interactive map
- Location: 123-145 Ottawa Ave., and 104-124 Monroe Center, NW, Grand Rapids, Michigan
- Coordinates: 42°57′57″N 85°40′14″W
- Area: 1 acre (0.40 ha)
- Built: 1859
- Architect: William G. Robinson et al.
- Architectural style: Late Victorian, Italianate
- NRHP reference No.: 83000878
- Added to NRHP: September 8, 1983

The Ledyard Block Historic District is a group of seven adjacent, coherently designed, nineteenth century commercial structures located within a square block at 123-145 Ottawa Avenue and 104-124 Monroe Center, NW, in Grand Rapids, Michigan. The group of buildings was listed on the National Register of Historic Places in 1983.

== History ==
In September, 1857, a disastrous fire destroyed 25 buildings along Monroe Avenue between Market Street and Ottawa Avenue. However, the area was quickly rebuilt with new commercial structures. The first of these was the Ledyard and Aldrich Block, located at the intersection of Monroe and Ottawa. The building was constructed in 1859 for prominent Grand Rapids businessmen William B. Ledyard and his son-in-law, Moses V. Aldrich. The pair built it as an investment property, to house retail stores on the first floor and offices and a boarding house upstairs. Other local businessmen followed, constructing their own buildings along Monroe. Ledyard followed this up with the 1874 construction of the Ledyard Block at Ottawa and Pearl, designed by William G. Robinson.

== Description ==
The Ledyard Block Historic District contains seven buildings, built in three waves. The first building constructed was the Ledyard and Aldrich Block (now known as the Flatiron Building), located at 102-108 Monroe Center, N.W., which was constructed in 1859-60. The building is a four-story brick Italianate structure spanning seven bays on Monroe and nine on Ottawa. The acute angle between is rounded. Projecting eaves, supported by large wooden brackets, run across the top. Windows are a mix of segmental-arch and round-headed units, all with molded caps.

The second wave of construction consists of five adjacent, similar buildings, located at 112, 114, 116, 118, and 122-24 Monroe Center, all built in about 1860. All five buildings are all four-story brick Italianate commercial structures, three or four bays wide. The last (at 122-124) was originally three stories, but a fourth has been added. The buildings are similar in appearance, to the Flatiron Building, although in some cases with less detailing. The buildings were originally constructed for different local businessmen, including Dr. Charles Shepard (112), James Lyman (114), Samuel F. Perkins (116), and John S. Nevius (118).

The final wave of construction in the district was the Ledyard Block, built at 123-145 Ottawa Avenue in 1874. It is a four-story yellow brick Italianate block, running 177 feet long along Ottawa Avenue and 99 feet along Pearl Street. The building has Ionia sandstone belt courses and window surrounds. Masonry piers separate the windows. A galvanized iron cornice runs across the top.
