= The Lofts Apartments =

- Medical Arts Building
- U.S. National Register of Historic Places
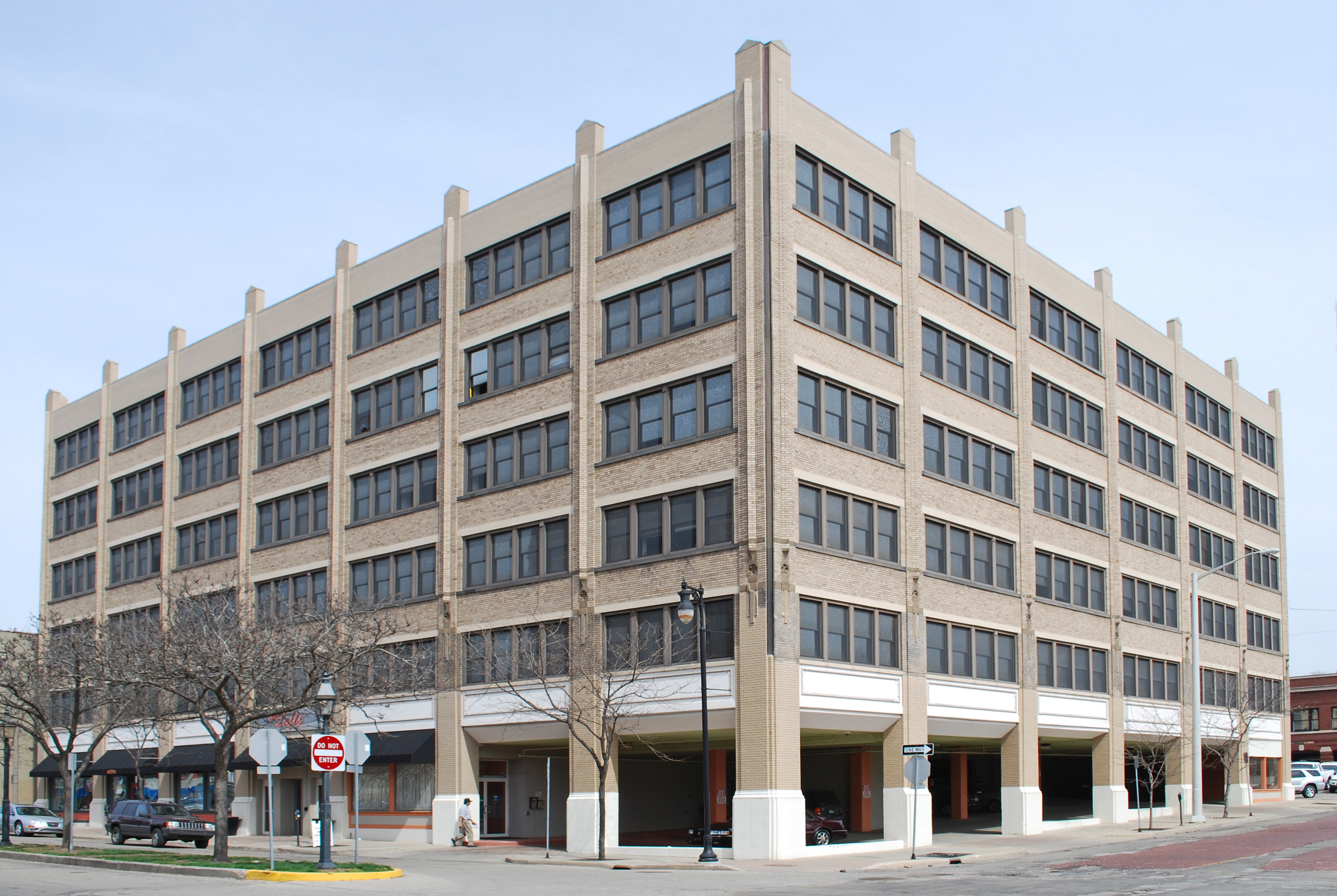

- Location within Michigan Location within the United States
- Interactive map
- Location: 26 Sheldon Blvd. SE, Grand Rapids, Michigan
- Coordinates: 42°57′44″N 85°39′58″W
- Area: less than one acre
- Built: 1926
- Built by: Owen Ames Kimball
- Architect: Bayard Kendall Gibson, Henry H. Turner
- Architectural style: Early Commercial
- NRHP reference No.: 00000506
- Added to NRHP: May 18, 2000

The Lofts Apartments, formerly known as the Medical Arts Building or the Becker Building, is an apartment building at 26 Sheldon Boulevard SE in Grand Rapids, Michigan. The building was constructed as an office building in 1926, and was listed on the National Register of Historic Places in 2000.

== History ==
In the early 1920s, a group of local doctors and businessmen formed the "Professional Building Company" for the purpose of constructing an office building dedicated to medical professionals. In 1923, the group hired architect B.K. Gibson of Chicago to design a building. Construction was started in 1926, with developer and auto dealer Ray E. Becker spearheading the project. The firm of Owen Ames Kimball did the construction, completing the lower two floors of the building that year. In 1927, the upper four floors were added. By 1928, there were over 30 physicians with offices in the building, and Becker opened a Hudson-Essex auto dealership on the ground floor.

In 1931, an addition, designed by local architect Henry H. Turner, was constructed on the building. The building continued to be a prominent center for medical professionals well into the 1980s. In 1996, Grand Pointe Limited Partnership purchased the building and rehabilitated it into fifty-five apartments, with commercial space and common areas on the first floor.

== Description ==
The Medical Arts Building is a six-story, L-shaped early 20th century commercial style building located on a corner lot. It is constructed of reinforced concrete, clad with brick veneer and stone details, and has a flat roof. The building has Gothic Revival and Chicago School architectural features. The facade along Sheldon Boulevard is seven bays wide, and the facade along Weston Street is six bays wide. The bays are divided by brick piers, and each contain banks of four double-hung windows on each floor. The piers are finished in brick with stone trim at the second/third story level. The windows have limestone sills and cast-stone lintels. The corner of the building is open at the first floor, with a drive for cars to enter the parking ramp behind the main facade.
