= Eastern Avenue School =

- U.S. National Register of Historic Places
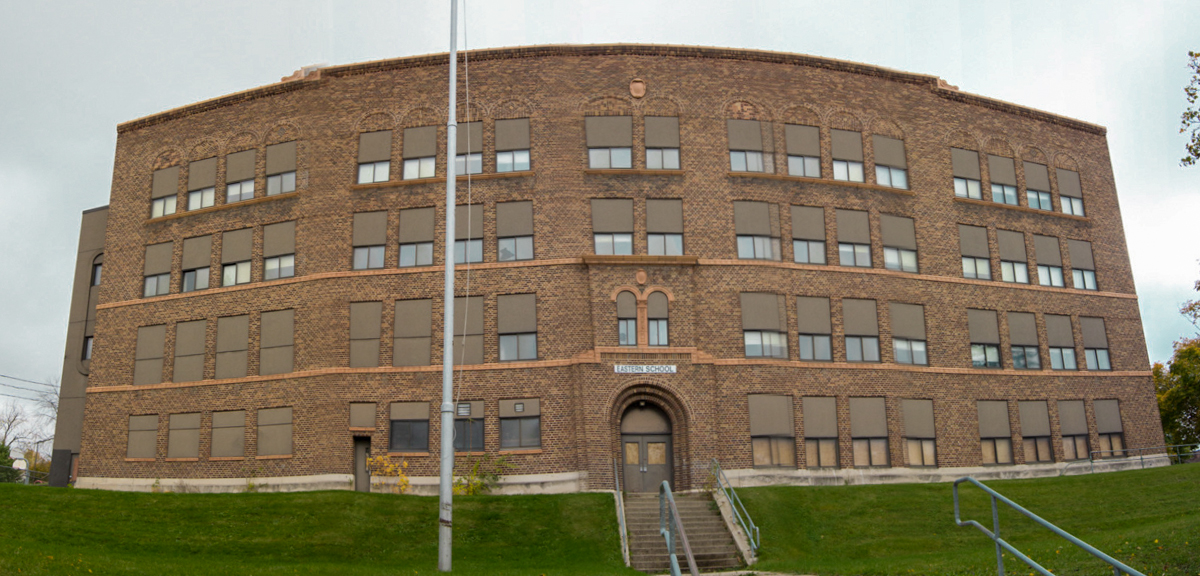

- Location within Michigan Location within the United States
- Interactive map
- Location: 758 Eastern Ave., NE., Grand Rapids, Michigan
- Coordinates: 42°58′36″N 85°38′56″W
- Area: 4.2 acres (1.7 ha)
- Built: 1929
- Architect: Henry H. Turner
- Architectural style: Romanesque Revival, Early Commercial
- NRHP reference No.: 13000666
- Added to NRHP: September 4, 2013

Eastern Avenue School is a former public school building located at 758 Eastern Avenue NE in Grand Rapids, Michigan. It was listed on the National Register of Historic Places in 2013. As of 2018, the current owner plans to convert the building into apartments.

== History ==
In 1921, the Grand Rapids Board of Education authorized the construction of a wing in the new Stocking Elementary School for use by a program serving physically challenged children. Architect Henry H. Turner designed the new building. However, despite spaces for 50 students, the program was overcrowded six years later. At the same time, the school serving the Highland Park area was becoming obsolete and overcrowded. In 1927, the Board purchased a new site in the heart of Highland Park, and again hired Turner to design a school to accommodate both the area elementary students and 150 students in special education from all over the city. Construction began, and the school opened in 1929.

The school served as an elementary school for the neighborhood until it was closed in 2008. The building remained vacant and was sold to a developer in 2012, for the purpose of converting the school into housing. Those plans fell through, and it was purchased by a charter school, then by the Inner City Christian Federation (ICCF) in 2016. ICCF plans to convert the building into apartments.

== Description ==
Eastern Avenue School is a four-story, flat-roofed building built into a hillside so that the rear facade is only two stories high. The building is of a simple Romanesque Revival design, with large, closely placed windows interspersed with solid walls. The building is clad with multicolored brown, red, orange, and golden brick and terra cotta and sits on an Indiana limestone base. A two-story bay projects from the south elevation. A parapet wall runs across the top of the facades.
