= Third Reformed Church =

Historic church in Michigan, United States

- U.S. National Register of Historic Places
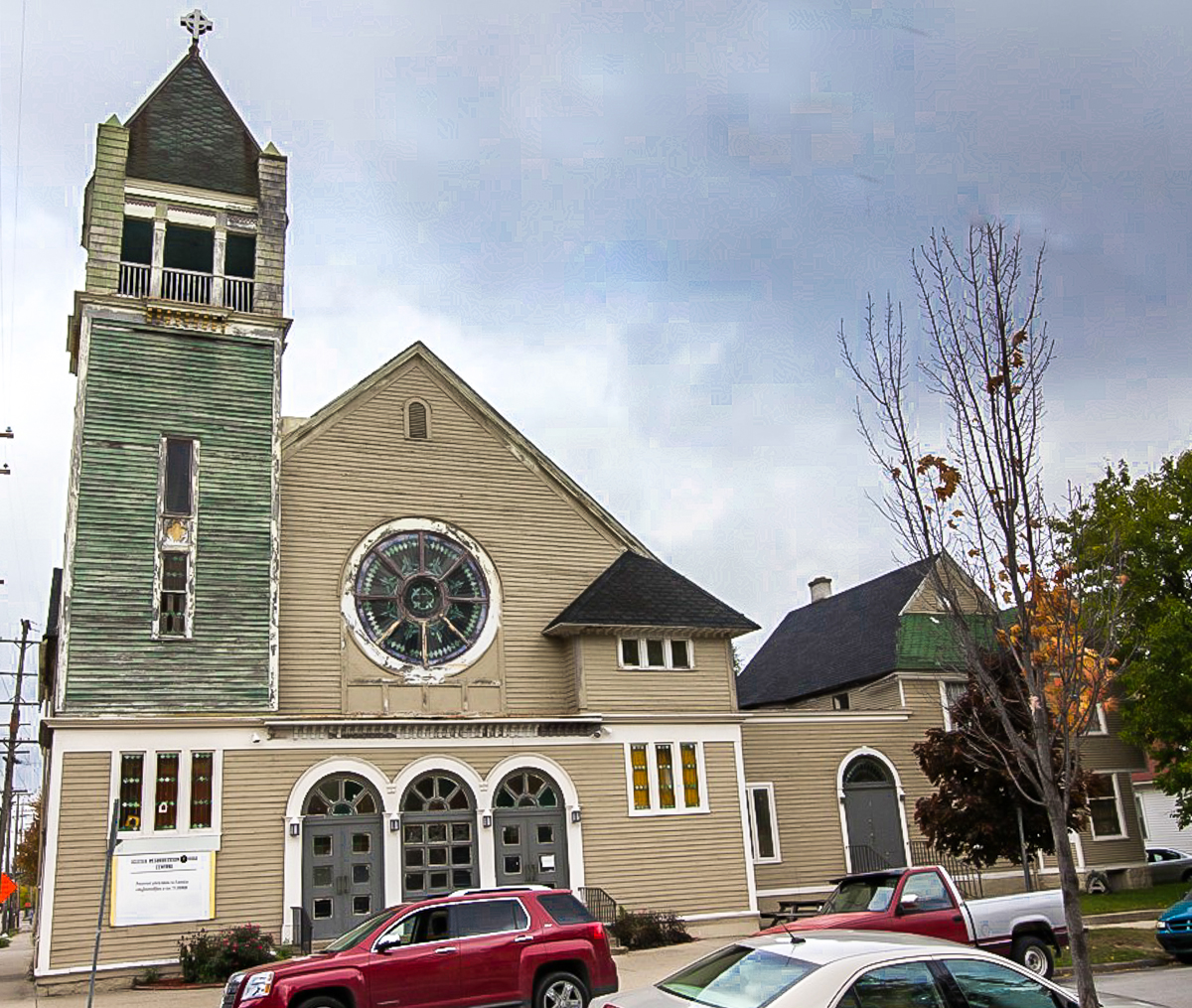

- Location within Michigan Location within the United States
- Interactive map
- Location: 1009 Hermitage St., SE, Grand Rapids, Michigan
- Coordinates: 42°57′40″N 85°38′39″W
- Area: less than one acre
- Built: 1875
- Architectural style: Shingle Style, Gothic Revival, Richardsonian Romanesque
- NRHP reference No.: 82002845
- Added to NRHP: April 22, 1982

Third Reformed Church (now the Church of God in Christ) is a historic church at 1009 Hermitage St., SE in Grand Rapids, Michigan. It was built in 1875 and added to the National Register in 1982. As of 2019, the church was being rehabilitated into a neighborhood arts center.

== History ==
Beginning in the 1840s, Dutch Protestants moved into this area of Michigan. In 1849, a community of Dutch immigrants in Grand Rapids established the Second Reformed Church. Both the church and Grand Rapids grew, and in 1875, the Third Reformed Church was founded as a subsidiary to serve congregants living on the east side of Grand Rapids. The original church building was constructed that same year, and was enlarged and remodeled multiple times thereafter, in a 1878, 1887–88, and 1894. The church remained substantially Dutch in nature for a substantial period, offering Dutch-language services until 1944.

In the 1960s, the Third Reformed moved to a new suburban location, and in 1968 sold the building to the Grace Pentecostal Church of God in Christ, a congregation which had been organized in 1950. In 1995, the church was sold to Iglesia Resurrection Y Vida. However, the congregation faltered, and the building became vacant. The building was purchased by preservationists in 2017; as of 2019, rehabilitation into a neighborhood arts center had begun.

== Description ==
The Third Reformed Church complex consists of the church itself, the two-story, clapboarded former parsonage constructed in 1900, and a small single-story, structure connecting the two. The church building is a broad-fronted, structure with a gable roof, covered in clapboard. A pyramid-roofed, square tower is located at one corner. The building measures forty-eight feet wide by eighty-three feet deep, of which half consists of additions constructed after the original 1975 church was built. Next to the tower is a triple-arch entranceway below a circular, stained glass gable window.
