= List of people with given name John =

This is a list of people and fictional characters with given name John.

== Real persons ==
=== Acting ===
- John Aasen (1890–1938), American actor
- John Abraham (born 1972), Indian actor
- John G. Adolfi (1888–1933), American actor
- John Agar (1921–2002), American film and television actor
- John Alderton (born 1940), English retired actor
- John Ales (born 1969), American actor
- John Alvin (actor) (1917–2009), American actor
- John Patrick Amedori (born 19??), American actor and musician
- John Amos (1939–2024), American actor
- John Amplas (born 1949), American actor
- John Anderson (actor), (1922–1992), American actor
- John Anderson (director) (born 1954), American documentary film director, producer, editor and writer
- John Anderson (sportscaster) (born 1965), American ESPN television sports journalist and co-host of Wipeout
- John Anderson (TV personality) (born 1931), Scottish television personality, referee on the series Gladiators
- John H. Anderson (set decorator), American set decorator
- John Murray Anderson (1886–1954), Newfoundland-American theater director
- John Aniston (1933–2022), Greek-born American actor father of actress Jennifer Aniston
- John W. Anson (1817–1881), British actor
- John Aprea (born 1941), American actor and comedian
- John Arcilla (born 1966), Filipino actor
- John Arledge (1906–1947), American actor
- John Asher (born 1971), American actor
- John Ashley (actor) (1934–1997), American actor
- John Astin (born 1930), American actor
- John Aylward (1946–2022), American actor
- John Baer (actor) (1923–2006), American actor
- John Bailey (American actor) (1947–1994), American actor
- John Barbour (actor) (1933–2026), Canadian actor, comedian and television host
- John Barrowman (born 1967), British-American actor
- John Barrymore (1882–1942), American actor
- John Blyth Barrymore (born 1954), American actor son of John Drew Barrymore
- John Drew Barrymore (1932–2004), American actor son of John Barrymore
- John Beasley (actor) (1943–2023), American actor
- John Belushi (1949–1982), American actor and comedian
- John Boncore (1952–2013), American actor
- John Bowers (actor) (1885–1936), American actor
- John Boyega (born 1992), English actor
- John Brandon (actor) (1929–2014), American film and television actor
- John Byner (born 1938), American actor, comedian and impressionist
- John Candy (1950–1994), Canadian actor
- John Carlisle (actor) (1935–2011), British actor
- John Carradine (1906–1988), American actor
- John David Carson (1952–2009), American actor
- John Cena (born 1977), American actor and professional wrestler
- John Challis (1942–2021), English actor
- John Davis Chandler (1935–2010), American actor
- John Cho (born 1972), American actor
- John Cliff (actor) (1918–2001), American film and television actor
- John Cornell (1941–2021), Australian actor
- John Fred Cruz (born 1957), American technologist and actor
- John J. Campbell (born 1960), American actor and model
- John Lloyd Cruz (born 1983), Filipino actor
- John Cusack (born 1966), American actor, producer, and screenwriter
- John Dearth (1920–1984), British actor
- John DeSantis, Canadian actor
- John Deverell (1880–1965), British actor
- John Diehl (born 1950), American actor
- John DiMaggio (born 1968), American actor
- John Ducey (born 1969), American actor
- John Duda (born 1977), American actor
- John Dullaghan (1930–2009), American film, stage and television actor
- John Erwin (born 1936), American voice actor
- John Estrada (born 1973), Filipino actor
- John Forsythe (1918–2010), American actor
- John Franklin (actor) (born 1959), American actor
- John Garfield (1913–1952), American actor
- John Gielgud (1904–2000), English actor
- John Goodman (born 1952), American actor
- John Gordon Sinclair (born 1962), British voice actor
- John Bregar (born 1985), Canadian actor
- John Hannah (actor) (born 1962), Scottish actor
- John Hasler (born 1974), English actor and voice actor
- John Heard (actor) (1946–2017), American actor
- John Heffernan (American actor) (1934–2018), American film, stage and television actor
- John Henry (actor) (1738–1794), Irish and early American actor
- John Hensley (born 1977), American actor
- John Hill (actor) (born 1977), American actor
- John Stephen Hill (born 1953), Canadian actor
- John Hill (actor) (born 1978), American actor
- John Hillerman (1932–2017), American actor
- John Robert Hoffman, American actor, screenwriter, director and producer
- John Hora (1940–2021), American actor
- John Hostetter (1946–2016), American actor and visual artist
- John Houseman (1902–1988), Romanian-born British-American actor
- John Hoyt (1905–1991), American actor
- John Hurt (1940–2017), English actor
- John Ioannou, Canadian actor
- John Ireland (actor) (1914–1992), Canadian actor
- John M. Jackson (born 1950), American actor
- John Kapelos (born 1956), Canadian actor
- John Kassir (born 1957), American actor and stand-up comedian
- John Krasinski (born 1979), American actor, director and producer
- John Lapus (born 1973), Filipino actor, comedian and director
- John Lasell (born 1928), American film and television actor
- John Lawlor (actor), (born 1941), American actor and assistant director
- John Lebar, British actor
- John Lone (born 1952), Hong Kong-born American actor
- John Lithgow (born 1945), American actor, author, musician, poet and singer
- John Carroll Lynch (born 1963), American actor
- John MacAndrews, British actor
- John Magaro (born 1983), American actor
- John Mahon (actor) (1938–2020), American film, stage and television actor
- John Malkovich (born 1953), American actor, voice actor, producer, director and fashion designer
- John Manalo (born 1995), Filipino actor
- John Martin (actor) (born 1951), American film and television actor
- John C. McGinley (born 1959), American actor
- John Cameron Mitchell (born 1963), two-time Tony Award winning American actor
- John Miljan (1892–1960), American actor
- John Moore (stage manager) (1814–1893), British actor
- John Mulaney (born 1982), American actor and stand-up comedian
- John Neville (actor) (1925–2011), English theatre and film actor
- John Ford Noonan (1941–2018), American actor, playwright, and screenwriter
- John O'Hurley (born 1954), American actor, comedian, author, game show host and television personality
- John Pankow (born 1954), American actor
- John Paragon (1954–2021), American actor, writer, and director
- John Paul (actor) (1921–1995), British actor
- John Pinette (1964–2014), American stand-up comedian, actor, and Broadway performer
- John Pleshette (born 1942), American actor and screenwriter
- John Prats (born 1984), Filipino actor and comedian
- John Robert Powers (1892–1977), American actor
- John Ratzenberger (born 1947), American actor, voice actor, director and entrepreneur
- John C. Reilly (born 1965), American actor, comedian, screenwriter, producer and musician
- John Reynolds (actor) (born 1991), American actor
- John Ritter (1948–2003), American actor
- John Richardson (actor) (1934–2021), English actor
- John Franklyn-Robbins, British actor
- John Robbins (illustrator) (died 2016), host of the public television program Cover to Cover
- John Russell (actor) (1921–1991), American film and television actor
- John Paul Ruttan (born 2001), Canadian actor
- John P. Ryan (1936–2007), American actor
- John Sayles (born 1950), American actor
- John Saxon (1936–2020), American actor
- John Schlesinger (1926–2003), English film and stage director, and actor
- John Schwab (born 1972), American actor, voice actor, musician and producer
- John Wesley Shipp (born 1955), American actor
- John Slattery (born 1962), American actor
- John Snee (born 1974), American former film and television actor
- John Stahl (1953–2022), Scottish actor
- John Stamos (born 1963), American actor and musician
- John Stephenson (actor) (1923/1924–2015), American actor
- John Stocker (voice actor) (born 1947), Canadian voice actor
- John Todd (actor) (1876–1957), American actor
- John Travolta (born 1954), American actor and singer
- John Vernon (1932–2005), Canadian actor
- John Viener (born 1972), American actor, comedian, writer, and producer
- John Vivyan (1915–1983), American stage and television actor
- John Wayne (1907–1979), American actor and filmmaker
- John Wesley (actor) (1947–2019), American actor
- John Westley (actor) (1878–1948), American stage actor
- John J. York (born 1958), American actor
- John Zacherle (1918–2016), American actor
- John Zenda (1944–1994), American film and television actor

=== Business ===
- John G. Agar (lawyer) (1856–1935), American lawyer
- John Anderson (Scottish businessman) (1747–1820), Scottish merchant and founder of Fermoy, Ireland
- John Aspinall (zoo owner) (1926–2000), British casino and zoo owner
- John F. Bergstrom, American entrepreneur
- John Wilford Blackstone Sr. (1796–1868), American lawyer
- John Vernou Bouvier Jr. (1866–1948), American Wall Street lawyer and stockbroker
- John Vernou Bouvier III (1891–1957) American Wall Street stockbroker and socialite
- John W. Brady (1869 or 1870–1943), American lawyer
- John Cameron, Lord Abernethy (born 1938), Scottish lawyer
- John Cameron, Lord Cameron (1900–1996), Scottish judge
- John Cameron, Lord Coulsfield (1934–2016), Scottish judge
- John Coolidge (1906–2000), American executive, businessman, and entrepreneur
- John Davis (British businessman) (1906–1993), English managing director of the Rank Organization, later Chairman
- John A. Eastman (1821–1895), American lawyer
- John Eastman, American lawyer
- John F. Grundhofer (1939–2021), American businessman
- John M. Harrell (1828–1907), American lawyer
- John W. Henry (born 1949), American businessman and owner of sports teams
- John Henry Hill (1791–1882), American businessman, educator and missionary
- John Hill (planter) (1824–1910), Scottish-born American industrialist and planter
- John Hill (businessman) (1847–1926), Australian coach-horse operator
- John J. Hill (1853–1952), English-born American stonemason and builder
- John A. Hill (1858–1916), American editor and publisher, co-founder of McGraw-Hill
- John Sprunt Hill (1869–1961), American lawyer, banker and philanthropist
- John W. Hill (1890–1977), American public relations executive
- John Hindley, 1st Viscount Hyndley (1883–1963), British businessman
- John E. Irving (1932–2010), Canadian businessman
- John Jay (lawyer) (1817–1894), American diplomat and lawyer, grandson of John Jay, the American Founding Father and statesman
- John Wayles Jefferson (1835–1892), American businessman
- John Sackville Labatt (1880–1952), Canadian businessman
- John McAfee, (1945–2021), British-American computer programmer, businessman and prisoner
- John A. McCone (1902–1991), American businessman and CIA director
- John F. McGee (1861–1925), United States district judge
- John C. Major (born 1931), former Justice of the Supreme Court of Canada
- John Marshall (Kansas judge) (1858–1931), American justice of the Kansas Supreme Court
- John Menard Jr., (born 1940), American billionaire businessman
- John Preston, Lord Fentonbarns (died 1616), Scottish lawyer and judge
- John Paul (judge) (1839–1901), American politician and judge
- John J. Raskob (1879–1950), American businessman and Empire State Building developer
- Jack W. Robbins (1919–2005), American prosecutor at Nuremberg trials
- John D. Rockefeller (1839–1937), American business tycoon
- John D. Rockefeller Jr. (1874–1960), American financier, philanthropist, son of John D. Rockefeller
- John D. Rockefeller III (1906–1978), American philanthropist, son of John D. Rockefeller Jr.
- John Aspinwall Roosevelt (1916–1981), American businessman, sixth and youngest son of Franklin D. Roosevelt
- John Ellis Roosevelt, Roosevelt family member
- John T. Scopes (1900–1970), central figure in the Scopes Trial regarding the teaching of evolution
- John Ternus (born 1975 or 1976), American engineer and business executive, upcoming CEO of Apple Inc.
- John de Verdion (d. 1802), London-based bookseller
- John Wayles (1715–1773), American colonial planter and slave trader
- John Alexander Weir (1894–1942), Canadian lawyer and professor

=== Crime ===
- John Arthur Ackroyd (died 2016), American murderer
- John Bodkin Adams (1899–1983), British criminal
- John Patrick Addis (1950–2006), American parental child kidnapper
- John Agrue (1947–2009), American serial killer
- John Alite (born 1962), Albanian American former Gambino crime family associate
- John Allen (murderer) (1934–2015), British criminal
- John Eric Armstrong (born 1973), American serial killer
- John Ashley (bandit) (1888 or 1895–1924), American outlaw
- John Balaban (serial killer) (1924–1953), Romanian-born serial killer
- John Battaglia (1955–2018), American murderer
- John Baughman (1941–2000), American murderer
- John Baxter (explorer) (1799–1841), Irish convict
- John C. Beale (born 1948), former senior policy advisor convicted of fraud and theft
- John William Bean (1824–1882), British criminal who attempted to assassinate Queen Victoria
- John Billee (1873–1890), American outlaw and Creek Indian
- John Bittrolff (born 1966), American murderer
- John Bodkin (c. 1720 – 1742), Irish murder
- John Charles Bolsinger (1957–1988), American serial killer
- John T. Bone (1947–2019), British pornographic film director who became a drug dealer
- John Wilkes Booth (1838–1865), American actor who assassinated President Abraham Lincoln
- John Ronald Brown (1922–2010), American murderer
- John Bull (gunman) (1836–1929), English gunman
- John Dwight Canaday (1945–2012), American serial killer
- John Cannan (born 1954), British murderer, serial rapist, and serial abductor
- John Paul Chase (1901–1973), American robber
- John Childs (murderer), British hit man and serial killer
- John William Clouser (born 1932), American robber
- John Cooper (serial killer) (born 1944), Welsh serial killer
- John Coxon (pirate), pirate and fugitive
- John Martin Crawford (1962–2020), Canadian serial killer
- John Christie (serial killer) (1899–1953), English serial killer
- John Crenshaw (1797–1871), American kidnapper
- John Brennan Crutchley (1946–2002), American convicted kidnapper, rapist, and suspected serial killer
- John Cunningham (Irish criminal), Irish drug smuggler and kidnapper
- John D'Amato (died 1992), American murder mobster
- John Darwin (born 1950), British criminal
- John Dickman (1864–1910), English murderer
- John DiFronzo (1928–2018), American mobster and the reputed former boss of the Chicago Outfit
- John Dillinger (1903–1934), American gangster of the Great Depression
- John Duffy (born 1958), British serial rapist
- John David Duty (1952–2010), American murderer
- John Timothy Earnest, (born 1999) American mass shooter
- John Eichinger (born 1972), American murderer
- John Ewell (born 1957), American serial killer
- John Factor (1892–1984), American prohibition-era gangster and con artist
- John Fautenberry (1963–2009), American serial killer
- John Linley Frazier (1946–2009), American mass murderer
- John Wayne Gacy (1942–1994), American serial killer and sex offender
- John Albert Gardner (born 1979), American convicted double murderer, rapist, and child molester
- John Geoghan (1935–2003), American serial child rapist
- John Getreu (1944–2023), American serial killer
- John Charles Gilkey (born 1968), American prolific serial thief
- John K. Giles (1895–1979), American inmate at Alcatraz prison
- John Gotti (1940–2002), American gangster
- John Haigh (1909–1949), English serial killer
- John Hamilton (gangster) (1899–1934), Canadian fugitive
- John Patrick Hannan (born 1933), Irish prison fugitive who holds the record for the longest escape from custody
- John Wesley Hardin (1853–1895), American Old West outlaw
- John Ruthell Henry (1951–2014), American serial killer
- John R. Hicks (1956–2005), American murderer
- John Hinckley Jr. (born 1955), American criminal
- John Hirst (criminal) (born 1950), British convicted murderer
- John Michael Hooker (1953–2003), American serial killer
- John W. Hopkins (1953–2000), American serial killer and kidnapper
- John Jamelske (born 1935), American serial rapist-kidnapper
- John Joubert (serial killer) (1963–1996), American serial killer
- John Kelley (criminal) (1914–2000), American reputed mobster
- John Allen Kendrick (1901–1960), American criminal, escape artist, and bank robber
- John Kinney (outlaw) (1847–1919), American outlaw of the Old West, who formed the John Kinney Gang
- John Kiriamiti (born 1950), Kenyan former bank robber
- John M. Larn (1849–1878), American lawman and later outlaw
- John Walker Lindh (born 1981), American who was captured as an enemy combatant during the United States' invasion of Afghanistan in November 2001
- John List (serial killer) (1925–2008), American mass murderer and fugitive
- John Ingvar Lövgren (1930–2002), Swedish serial killer
- John Makin (1845–1893), Australian murderer
- John Peter Malveaux (born 1964), American serial killer
- John Marek (murderer) (1961–2009), American murderer
- John Martino, American mobster
- John Mason (outlaw) (18??–April 1866), American fugitive and one of the leaders of the Mason Henry Gang
- John McAfee (1945–2021), British-American computer programmer and businessman who committed suicide in prison
- John McCaffary (1820–1851), Irish-American murderer
- John Rodney McRae, American murderer and suspected serial killer
- John Middleton (cowboy) (1854–1885), American outlaw and friend of Billy the Kid
- John Mobberly (C. 1844–1865), American war criminal
- John Murrell (bandit) (1806–1844), American outlaw
- John Palmer (criminal) (1950–2015), English gangster
- John Felton Parish (1933–1982), American mass murderer
- John Paul Sr. (racing driver) (born 1939), American racing driver, convicted felon and fugitive whose whereabouts are unknown
- John Parsons (criminal) (born 1971), American fugitive
- John du Pont (1938–2010), American convicted murderer
- John M. Pyle (born 1956), American fugitive
- John Richardson (convict) (1797–1882), Australian convict who accompanied several exploring expeditions as a botanical collector
- John Edward Robinson (born 1943), American serial killer, con man, embezzler, kidnapper, and forger
- John Wesley Robinson (1867–1915), American serial killer
- John Roselli (1905–1976), American influential mobster for the Chicago Outfit
- John Ruffo (born 1954), American fugitive whose whereabouts are unknown
- John Salvi (1972–1996), American anti-abortion extremist and murderer
- John Selman (1839–1896), American fugitive
- John Paul Scott (1927–1987), American criminal
- John Sontag (1861–1893), American outlaw
- John Svahlstedt (born 1947), Swedish serial rapist
- John Edward Swindler (1944–1990), American murderer
- John Thanos (1949–1994), American spree killer
- John Tillmann (1961–2018), Canadian art thief
- John Jairo Moreno Torres (1979–1998), Colombian serial killer
- John Wojtowicz (1945–2006), American bank robber
- John Younger (1851–1874), American outlaw

=== Literature ===
- John Richard Alden (1908–1991), American author
- John David Anderson (born 1975), American writer
- John J. Anderson (1956–1989), writer and editor covering computers and technology
- J. Redwood Anderson (1883–1964), English poet
- John Wesley Anderson (born 1954), American author
- John Baker (legal historian) (born 1944), English legal historian and academic
- John Roman Baker (born 1944), British playwright and activist
- John Kendrick Bangs (1862–1922), American author
- John Banville (born 1945), Irish writer
- John Barth (born 1930), American writer
- John Batki (born 1942), American short story writer, poet, and translator
- John Tucker Battle (1902–1962), American screenwriter
- John Betjeman (1906–1984), English poet, writer and broadcaster
- John Braine (1922–1986), English writer
- John Bunyan (1628–1688), English writer and preacher
- John Bryant (journalist) (1944–2020), British journalist
- John Buchan (1875–1940), British author and politician
- John Burnside (1955–2024), Scottish writer
- John Carroll (author) (born 1944), Australian conservative writer
- John Carroll (journalist) (1942–2015), American journalist and editor
- John Cochran (Survivor contestant) (born 1987), American television writer, and former reality television personality
- John Francis Carroll (1858–1917), newspaper publisher and editor
- John Cheever (1912–1982), American novelist and short story writer
- John Clare (1793–1864), English poet
- John Maxwell Coetzee (born 1940), South African-Australian novelist and essayist
- John Cunliffe (author), English children's book author
- John Donne (1572–1631), English poet and cleric
- John Dryden (1631–1700), English poet and playwright
- John T. Dugan (1920–1994), American screenwriter
- John Dunkel (1915–2001), American screenwriter
- John Englehardt (born 1987), American fiction writer and educator
- John Fetterman (1920–1975), American journalist
- John Fowles (1926–2005), English novelist
- John Galsworthy (1867–1933), English novelist and playwright
- John Gardner (American writer) (1933–1982), American novelist and educator
- John Gardner (British writer) (1926–2007), English spy and thriller novelist
- John Gray (poet) (1866–1934), English poet
- John Grant (author) (1949–2020), pseudonym used by science fiction writer Paul Le Page Barnett
- John Grant (children's author) (1930–2014), Scottish author and illustrator
- John Green (1977–), American writer
- John L. Greene (1912–1995), American screenwriter
- John Grisham (born 1955), American writer
- John Gunther (1901–1970), American journalist and author
- M. John Harrison (born 1945), author
- John Hersey (1914–1993), American journalist and novelist
- John Hill (screenwriter) (1947–2017), American screenwriter
- John Hockenberry (born 1956), American journalist and author
- John Irving (born 1942), American novelist and screenwriter
- John Major Jenkins (born 1964), American author and populariser of the Maya calendar
- John Keats (1795–1821), English romantic poet
- John Lasseter (born 1957), American film director, producer, screenwriter and animator
- John le Carré (1931–2020), British-Irish author
- John Masefield (1878–1967), English poet and writer
- John McClain, American sportswriter
- John McPhee (born 1931), American writer
- John Milton (1608–1674), English poet and intellectual
- John Muir (1838–1914), Scottish-born American naturalist and author
- John Mulaney (born 1982), American comedian known for his work on Saturday Night Live
- John Munonye (1929–1999), Igbo writer
- John Dos Passos (1896–1970), American novelist
- John Pearson (author) (1930–2021), English novelist
- John Preston (English author) (born 1953), English journalist and novelist
- John Pudney (1909–1977), British poet, journalist and author
- John Rappaport (screenwriter), American screenwriter
- John Rechy (born 1931), Mexican-American novelist and essayist
- John Romita Sr., father of John Romita Jr.
- John Romita Jr., son of John Romita Sr.
- John Robbins (author) (born 1947), American author, known for his books on food and health
- John Scalzi (born 1969), American science fiction author
- John Steane (archaeologist) (born 1931), English former headmaster, archaeologist, and author
- John Steinbeck (1902–1968), American writer
- John Stuart Mill (1806–1873), English philosopher and political economist
- John Suchet (born 1944), English author
- John Ronald Reuel Tolkien (1892–1973), English writer and philologist
- John Updike (1932–2009), American novelist
- John Verney (author) (1913–1993), English author and illustrator
- John Weir (writer) (born 1959), American writer
- John Whittington (screenwriter), American screenwriter
- John Wyndham (1903–1969), English writer
- John Younger (writer) (1785–1860), writer, shoemaker, and poet

=== Military ===
- John Joseph Abercrombie (1798–1877), American brigadier general
- John Worthington Adams (1764–1837), British general in India
- John Giles Adams (1792–1832), U.S. commander at the Battle of Stillman's Run during the 1832 Black Hawk War
- John Adams (Confederate Army officer) (1825–1864), US Army officer
- John G. B. Adams (1841–1900), Civil War Medal of Honor recipient
- John Mapes Adams (1871–1921), Boxer Rebellion Medal of Honor recipient
- John Adams (Royal Navy officer, died 2008) (1918–2008), British rear admiral
- John G. Adams (1932–2003), Army counsel in the Army-McCarthy hearings
- John Adams (Canadian general) (born 1942), Canadian military leader
- John F. Aiso (1909–1987), American nisei military leader
- John Aiken (RAF officer) (1921–2005), Royal Air Force officer
- John Alcock (RAF officer) (1892–1919), Royal Air Force officer
- John Andrews (Medal of Honor) (1821–1???), United States Navy Ordinary Seaman
- John Taylor Arms (1887–1953), United States Navy officer and etcher
- John H. Aulick (1787–1791–1873), United States Navy officer
- John Cushing Aylwin (1780–1813), Officer in the United States Navy during the War of 1812
- John Babcock (1900–2010), last known surviving veteran of the Canadian military to have served in the First World War
- John M. Bacon (1844–1913), American general
- John Bacon (loyalist) (died 1783), Loyalist guerilla fighter during the American Revolutionary War
- John Baker (American Revolutionary War) (1731–1787), American Revolutionary War hero, for whom Baker County, Georgia was named
- John Baker (RAF officer) (1897–1978), British air marshal
- John Drayton Baker (1915–1942), United States Navy officer
- John Baker (general) (1936–2007), Australian Chief of the Defence Force
- John F. Baker Jr. (1945–2012), American soldier, Medal of Honor recipient
- John Baker (Royal Navy officer) (1660–1716), English naval officer, MP for Weymouth and Melcombe Regis
- John Baker (Medal of Honor, 1876) (1853–1???), American soldier
- John Henry Balch (1896–1980), United States Naval Reserve officer
- John Balmer (1910–1944), senior officer and bomber pilot in the Royal Australian Air Force
- John Sanford Barnes (1836–1911), United States Navy officer
- John Barrington (British Army officer) (c. 1722–1764), British Army officer
- John D. Barry (1839–1867), officer in the Confederate States Army during the American Civil War
- John R. Baylor (1822–1894), Senior officer of the Confederate States Army
- John Bello (born 1946), United States Navy officer
- John Bell Blish (1860–1921), United States Navy officer
- John Bigelow Jr. (1854–1936), United States Army lieutenant colonel
- John Sanbourne Bockoven (1915–2007), American psychiatrist who served as an officer in the U.S. Army Medical Corps of the during World War II
- John L. Borling (born 1940), retired major general of the United States Air Force
- John William Boucher (1844–1939), Canadian-American American Civil War veteran
- John Buford (1826–1863), United States Army cavalry officer
- John Bush (Royal Navy officer) (1914–2013), British Royal Navy officer
- John Cameron (British Army officer), British military officer and commander during the French Revolutionary and the Napoleonic Wars
- John Cameron (Royal Navy officer) (1874–1939)
- John Du Cameron (died 1753), Scottish sergeant in the French army
- John Cameron of Fassiefern, Scottish military commander
- John Cooke (Royal Navy officer) (1762–1805), English Royal Navy officer
- John G. Cowell (1785–1814), officer in the United States Navy during the War of 1812
- John Cubbon (1911–1997), British Army officer and entrepreneur
- John Owen Donaldson (1897–1930), American World War I flying ace
- John A. Dramesi (1933–2017), United States Air Force Colonel
- John Dundas (RAF officer) (1915–1940), Royal Air Force fighter pilot and flying ace of the Second World War
- John Eglit (1874–1914), United States Navy seaman serving in the
- John Eisenhower, United States Army officer, diplomat, and military historian, second and youngest son of Dwight D. Eisenhower
- John C. England (1920–1941), United States Navy officer
- John Heaphy Fellowes (1932–2010), United States Navy captain and pilot
- John P. Flynn (1922–1997), United States Air Force officer
- John D. Foley (1918–1999), United States Army Air Forces gunner
- John Franklin (1786–1847), British Royal Navy officer
- John M. Franklin (1896–1975), American general
- John Frost (British Army officer) (1912–1993), airborne officer of the British Army
- John Gingell (1925–2009), senior Royal Air Force commander
- John Harllee (admiral) (1914–2005), American admiral
- John Harrison (VC 1857) (1832–1865), Irish recipient of the Victoria Cross
- John B. Henry Jr., United States Air Force general
- John Joseph Henry (1758–1811), American Revolutionary War soldier
- John Hamar Hill or Johnnie Hill (1912–1998), British Royal Air Force officer
- John Hill (courtier) (before 1690–1735), British general and courtier, brother of Abigail Masham, Baroness Masham
- John Hill (British Army officer) (fl. 1777–1783), British Army officer during the American War of Independence
- John Hill (Royal Navy officer) (c. 1774–1855)
- John Hill (Indian Army officer) (1866–1935), British general
- John Thomas Hill (1811–1902), British Army officer
- John Hotaling (1824–1886), American soldier
- John Martin Howard (1917–1942), United States Navy officer
- John Illingworth (yacht designer) (1903–1980), English naval engineer in the Royal Navy
- John Irving (Royal Navy officer) (1815–c. 1848), British officer in the Royal Navy
- John Johnson, 8th Seigneur of Sark (died 1723), Seigneur of Sark, 1720–1723
- Sir John Johnson, 2nd Baronet (1741–1830), loyalist leader during the American Revolution
- John "Liver-Eating" Johnson (1824–1900), American frontier figure
- John Johnson (Medal of Honor, 1839) (1839–1???), United States Navy sailor
- John Johnson (Medal of Honor, 1842) (1842–1907), Norwegian-American Medal of Honor recipient
- John D. Johnson (general), U.S. Army general
- John Paul Jones (1747–1792), Scottish-American naval captain who was the United States' first well-known naval commander in the American Revolutionary War
- John Kennedy (Medal of Honor) (1834–1910), American soldier
- John Doby Kennedy (1840–1896), general in the Confederate States Army during the American Civil War
- John J. Kennedy (Republic of Texas politician) (1814–1880), soldier, lawyer and sheriff
- Sir John Kennedy (British Army officer, born 1878) (1878–1948), British general
- Sir John Kennedy (British Army officer, born 1893) (1893–1970), British general
- John Pitt Kennedy (1796–1879), British military engineer
- John Thomas Kennedy (1885–1969), American soldier
- John Kirby (admiral) (born 1963), United States retired Navy admiral
- John A. Kjellstrom (1923–2015), American lieutenant general
- John Kelvin Koelsch (1923–1951), United States Navy officer
- John Lerew (1912–1996), Royal Australian Air Force officer
- John B. Magruder (1807–1871), American and Confederate military officer
- John A. Manke (1931–2019), American test pilot and aerospace engineer
- John Minor Maury (1795–1824), Lieutenant in the United States Navy
- John S. McCain Jr. (1911–1981), United States Navy admiral who served in conflicts from the 1940s through the 1970s, including as the Commander, United States Pacific Command, father of John McCain
- John S. McCain Sr. (1884–1945), U.S. Navy admiral and the patriarch of the McCain military family, grandfather of John McCain
- John Neville (general) (1731–1803), American Revolutionary War officer later prominent in the Whiskey Rebellion
- John T. Newton (1793–1857), United States Navy officer
- John Verdun Newton (1916–1944), Australian Royal Australian Air Force (RAAF) officer
- John Pitcairn (1722–1775), Marine Service officer
- John R. Redman (1898–1970), United States Navy admiral
- John Hamilton Roberts (1881–1962), Canadian Army two-star general
- John Q. Roberts (1914–1942), United States Navy officer, pilot, and Navy Cross recipient
- John W. Roberts (1921–1999), United States Air Force four-star general
- John Roberts (Royal Navy officer) (1924–2025), British admiral
- John Schneidler (1868–1958), Swedish Navy vice admiral
- John K. Singlaub (1921–2022), United States Army general
- John Alexander Tyler, Son of John Tyler
- John P. Van Leer (1825–1862), Union Army officer
- John Walker (RAF officer) (born 1936), Chief of Defence Intelligence
- John Walker (Medal of Honor) (1845–1???), American Indian Wars soldier and Medal of Honor recipient
- John Walker (officer of arms) (1913–1984), English officer of arms
- John Anthony Walker (1937–2014), American communications specialist convicted in 1985 of spying for the Soviet Union
- John C. Walker, Indiana physician and officer during the American Civil War
- John George Walker (1821–1893), general in the Confederate States Army during the American Civil War
- John Grimes Walker (1835–1907), United States Navy admiral
- John T. Walker (USMC) (1893–1955), United States Marine Corp general
- John Young (naval officer) (1740–1781), United States captain in the Continental Navy during the American Revolutionary War

=== Music ===
- John Abercrombie (guitarist) (1944–2017), American jazz guitarist
- John Adams (composer) (born 1947), American composer
- John Luther Adams (born 1953), American composer
- John Addison (1920–1998), English composer
- John Anderson (jazz trumpeter) (1921–1974), American jazz musician
- John Anderson (producer) (born 1948), Northern Irish composer and producer
- John Anderson (musician) (born 1954), American country musician
- John Anderson, vocalist for the British rock band Charlie (founded 1971)
- John Arter, British singer-songwriter
- John Bailey (luthier) (1931–2011), maker of fine guitars in England
- John Bailey (producer), Canadian recording engineer, producer
- John Barry (composer) (1933–2011), English film composer
- John Beal (composer), American film composer
- John Beckwith (composer) (1927–2022), Canadian composer, writer, pianist, teacher, and university administrator
- John Berry (Beastie Boys), American hardcore punk musician
- John Blow (1649–1708), English composer
- John Bonham (1948–1980), drummer/percussionist for Led Zeppelin
- John Bröcheler (1945–2026), Dutch operatic baritone
- John Bull (composer) (1562–1628), English composer
- John Bush (musician) (born 1963), American metal vocalist for Armored Saint and Anthrax
- John Cage (1912–1992), American composer
- John Allan Cameron (1938–2006), Canadian folk singer
- John Casken (born 1949), English composer
- John Colianni (born 1966), American jazz pianist
- John Coltrane (1926–1967), American jazz saxophonist and composer
- John Cooper (musician) (born 1975), American bassist and vocalist for Skillet
- John Corabi (born 1959), American hard rock singer and guitarist
- John Corigliano (born 1938), American composer
- John Dankworth (1927–2010), English jazz musician
- John Darnielle (born 1967), American singer-guitarist, founder of The Mountain Goats and half of The Extra Lens
- John David Davis (1867–1942), English composer
- John D'earth (born 1950), American post-bop/hard bop jazz trumpeter
- John Debney (born 1956), American composer and conductor of film, television, and video game scores
- John Denver (1943–1997), American folk and country singer
- John Deacon (born 1951), British bass player for Queen
- John Doe (musician) (born 1953), American singer, songwriter, actor, and poet
- John Dowland (1563–1626), English composer
- John W. Duarte (1919–2004), English composer and guitarist
- John Dunstaple (1390–1453), English composer
- John Entwistle (1944–2002), English bassist for The Who
- John Fahey (musician) (1939–2001), American fingerstyle guitarist and composer
- John Farmer (composer) (c.1570–c.1601), English madrigal composer
- John Field (composer) (1782–1837), Irish composer
- John L. Finley (1935–2006), American astronaut
- John Finley (musician) (born 1945), Canadian musician
- John Conant Flansburgh (born 1960), American singer-guitarist, founder of Mono Puff, and one half of They Might Be Giants
- John Fogerty (born 1945), lead singer and guitarist for Creedence Clearwater Revival
- John Foreman (musician) (born 1972), Australian musician
- John Foulds (1880–1939), English composer
- Johnny Franz (1922–1977), English record producer
- John Frusciante (born 1970), guitarist for Red Hot Chili Peppers
- John Gardner (composer) (1917–2011), English composer
- John Maxwell Geddes (1941–2017), Scottish composer and academic
- John Goodgroome (1630?–1704), English musician
- John D. H. Greenwood (1889–1975), English composer
- John Harbison (born 1938), American composer
- John Heard (musician) (1938–2021), jazz bassist
- John Hicks (pianist) (1941–2006), American jazz pianist and composer
- John Hill (conductor) (born 1843), Australian church organist and choirmaster
- John Hill (musician) (active from 1993), American guitarist with the Apples in Stereo and Dressy Bessy
- John Hill (record producer) (active 2008 and after), American record producer, songwriter, and musician
- John Idan, American guitarist
- John Ireland (composer) (1879–1962), English composer
- John Jarrard (1953–2001), American country music songwriter
- John Jenkins (composer) (1592–1678), English composer
- John Paul Jones (musician) (born 1946), English musician, bass guitar and keyboards for Led Zeppelin
- John Joubert (composer) (1927–2019), English composer
- John Kander (born 1927), American musical theatre composer
- John Kinsella (composer) (1932–2021), Irish composer
- John Lanchbery (1923–2003), English-Australian composer
- John Legend (born 1978), American singer, songwriter, pianist, and record producer
- John Lennon (1940–1980), English singer-songwriter and founding member of the Beatles
- John Charles Julian Lennon (born 1963), English singer, son of John Lennon
- John Sidney Linnell (born 1959), American singer-songwriter and one half of They Might Be Giants
- John Lowe (musician) (born 1942), English pianist
- John Henry Maunder (1858–1920), English composer and organist
- John McCabe (composer) (1939–2015), British composer and classical pianist
- John McCarthy (composer) (born 1961), Canadian composer for film and television
- John Blackwood McEwen (1868–1948), Scottish composer
- John Mosca (musician) (born 1950), American jazz trombonist
- John Newman (singer) (born 1990), English singer, musician, songwriter and record producer
- John Oates (born 1948), American musician, half of Hall & Oates
- John O'Neill (guitarist) (born 1957), Irish rhythm guitarist
- John Knowles Paine (1839–1906), American composer
- John Pickard (composer) (born 1963), British composer
- John Prine (1946–2020), American singer-songwriter
- John Rutter (born 1945), English composer, conductor and choral arranger
- John Scofield (born 1951), American guitarist and composer
- John Sebastian (born 1944), American singer-songwriter, guitarist and harmonicist
- John Sebastian (classical harmonica player) (1914–1980), American musician and composer
- John Philip Shenale, Canadian composer, arranger, musician and producer
- John Philip Sousa (1854–1932), American composer
- Johnny Ruffo (1988–2023), Australian singer, songwriter, musician and actor
- John Sankey (drummer) (born 1975), Australian drummer
- John Stainer (1840–1901), British composer
- John Stanley (composer) (1712–1786), English composer
- John Sykes (composer) (1909–1962), English composer
- John Sykes (born 1959), guitarist for Thin Lizzy and Whitesnake
- John Tavener (1944–2013), 20th century English composer
- John Taverner (1490–1545), 16th century English composer
- John Veale (1922–2006), English composer
- John Wesley (guitarist) (born 1962), American rock singer and guitarist
- John White (composer) (born 1936), English experimental composer
- John Whitehead (singer) (1948–2004), American singer and songwriter
- John Wilbye (1574–1638), English composer
- John Williams (born 1932), American composer, conductor, and pianist
- John Woolrich (born 1954), English composer
- John York (musician) (born 1946), American bassist and guitarist
- John Zorn (born 1953), American composer, saxophonist and bandleader

=== Politics ===
- John Acclom (14th-century politician)
- John Acclom (15th-century politician) (1395–1458)
- John Adams (1735–1826), American statesman, attorney, diplomat, writer, and Founding Father who served as the second president of the United States from 1797 to 1801
- John Adams (Virginia politician) (1773–1825), Mayor of Richmond, Virginia
- John Adams (New York politician) (1778–1854), Congressman from New York
- John Adams (Ohio politician) (born 1960), Ohio House of Representatives
- John Adams (journalist) (1819–1897), American lawyer, politician and journalist in Maine
- John Adams Sr. (1691–1761), father of John Adams and grandfather of John Quincy Adams
- John Adams Sr. (Nebraska politician) (1876–1962), American minister, lawyer, and politician
- John Adams Jr. (Nebraska politician) (1906–1999), American lawyer and politician
- John Adams II (1803–1834), American government functionary and businessman, son of John Quincy Adams and grandson of John Adams
- John Quincy Adams (1767–1848), American statesman, diplomat, lawyer, and diarist who served as the sixth president of the United States from 1825 to 1829, son of John Adams
- John Quincy Adams II (1833–1894), American lawyer, politician, and member of the Adams political family, grandson of John Quincy Adams II, great-grandson of John Adams
- John J. Allen Jr. (1899–1995), U.S. representative from California's seventh congressional district
- John Judson Ames (1821–1861), American politician and California Pioneer
- John Anderson (New Jersey politician) (1665–1736), colonel who served as acting governor of New Jersey in 1736
- John Anderson (Maine politician) (1792–1853), United States Representative from Maine
- John T. Anderson (1804–1879), American politician in Virginia
- John Alexander Anderson (1834–1892), United States Representative from Kansas
- John C. Anderson (Wisconsin politician) (1862–????), Wisconsin state assemblyman
- John Anderson (Wisconsin senator) (1870–1954), Wisconsin state senator
- Jack Z. Anderson (1904–1981), United States Representative from California
- John Hope Anderson (1912–2005), American politician in Pennsylvania
- John Anderson Jr. (1917–2014), Governor of Kansas, 1961–1965
- John B. Anderson (1922–2017), United States Representative from Illinois and 1980 presidential candidate
- John C. Anderson (lawyer) (born 1975), United States Attorney for the District of New Mexico
- John N. Anderson, American politician in California
- Johnny Anderson (politician), member of the Utah House of Representatives
- Sir John Anderson, 1st Baronet, of Mill Hill (died 1813), British politician, MP for City of London, 1793–1806
- John Anderson (diplomatic writer) (1795–1845), Scottish diplomatic writer
- John Anderson (colonial administrator) (1858–1918), British governor of Straits Settlements and later of Ceylon
- John Anderson, 1st Viscount Waverley (1882–1958), British civil servant and politician
- John Anderson, 3rd Viscount Waverley (born 1949), British peer
- John Anderson (trade unionist), British trade union leader
- John Hawkins Anderson (1805–1870), member of the Canadian Senate
- John Anderson (Newfoundland politician) (1855–1930), Newfoundland businessman and politician
- John Victor Anderson (1918–1982), Canadian politician in Alberta
- John Gerard Anderson (1836–1911), Scottish-born educationalist and public servant in colonial Queensland
- John Anderson (Australian politician) (born 1956), Deputy Prime Minister of Australia and Leader of the National Party 1999–2005
- John Anderson (mayor) (1820–1897), mayor of Christchurch, New Zealand, blacksmith, engineer, businessman
- Crawford Anderson (John Crawford Anderson, c. 1848–1930), New Zealand politician, MP for Bruce electorate
- John Ole Aspli (born 1956), Norwegian politician
- John Attygalle (1906–1981), Inspector-General of Sri Lanka Police from 1966 to 1967
- John Bacon (Massachusetts politician) (1738–1820), American politician, judge, and pastor
- John F. Bacon (1789–1860), American lawyer
- John L. Bacon (1878–1961), American mayor of San Diego, California
- John Bailey (MP) (died 1436), MP for Cricklade and Calne
- John Bailey (Australian politician) (born 1954), Australian politician
- John Bailey (Massachusetts politician) (1786–1835), American politician from Massachusetts
- John Edgar Bailey (1897–1958), Northern Irish politician
- John H. Bailey (1864–1940), American politician, senator and representative in Texas
- John Moran Bailey (1904–1975), United States politician, chair of the Democratic National Committee
- John Mosher Bailey (1838–1916), U.S. Representative from New York
- John Bailey (Irish politician) (1945–2019), member of Dun Laoghaire/Rathdown County Council
- John Bailey (Victorian politician) (1826–1871), Australian politician
- John D. Bailey (1928–2018), American mayor of St. Augustine, Florida
- John Baker (fl. 1407), English MP for Lyme Regis, 1407
- John Baker (fl. 1421), English MP for Devizes, 1421
- John Baker (died 1544) (by 1503–44), English MP for Radnorshire
- Sir John Baker (1488–1558), English speaker of the House of Commons
- John Baker (MP for Bedford) (by 1501–1538 or later), English mayor and MP of Bedford
- John Baker (by 1531 – between 1604 and 1606), English MP for Horsham and Bramber
- John Baker (MP for Canterbury) (c. 1754 – 1831), British MP for Canterbury
- John Baker (representative) (1769–1823), United States congressman from Virginia
- John Baker (Australian politician) (1813–1872), briefly the Premier of South Australia
- Sir John Baker (Portsmouth MP) (1828–1909), British MP for Portsmouth
- John Tamatoa Baker (1852–1921), Hawaiian rancher, sheriff and governor
- John Baker (Labour politician) (1867–1939), British Labour MP for Bilston
- John Baker (Wisconsin politician) (1869–????), American politician from Wisconsin
- John Baker (defensive lineman, born 1935) (1935–2007), American football player and then sheriff of Wake County, North Carolina
- John Baker (Indiana politician) (1832–1915), United States congressman from Indiana
- John S. Baker (1861–1955), American politician from Washington
- Sir John Baker, 2nd Baronet (1608–1653), English politician
- John A. Baker Jr. (1927–1994), American diplomat
- John Arnold Baker (1925–2016), British judge and politician
- John Baker II (1780–1843), sheriff of Norfolk County, Massachusetts, 1834–1843
- John All Barham (1843–1926), American politician
- John Bartram (politician), English-born emigrant and Pennsylvania politician
- John Bear (politician), American politician and businessman
- John Black (Wisconsin politician) (1830–1899), French American immigrant and Democratic politician
- John Blanton (fl. 2016), American politician
- John Bidwell (1819–1900), Californian politician
- John M. Bolton (1901–1936), American businessman and politician
- John Boscawen (born c.1957), New Zealand politician
- John Boozman (born 1950), American politician
- John C. Breckinridge (1821–1875), American vice president
- John Breaux (born 1944), American politician
- John Y. Brown Sr. (1900–1985), American attorney and politician
- John H. Bryden (born 1943), Canadian politician
- Jeb Bush (John Ellis Bush, born 1953), American politician who served as the 43rd Governor of Florida from 1999 to 2007
- John V. Byrne (born 1928), American Republican
- John Moors Cabot (1901–1981), American diplomat and U.S. Ambassador
- John Calvin Coolidge Sr. (1845–1926), American politician and businessman from Vermont, father of Calvin Coolidge
- John C. Calhoun (1782–1850), American vice president
- John Coleman Calhoun (1871–1950), Canadian politician in Alberta
- John G. Capers (1866–1919), American attorney and politician
- John F. Carew (1873–1951), U.S. Representative from New York
- John M. Carroll (politician) (1823–1901), U.S. Representative from New York
- John Lee Carroll (1830–1911), American politician in Maryland
- John Carroll (mayor) (1836–1903), mayor of Dunedin
- John E. Carroll (1877–1955), Mayor of Seattle
- John A. Carroll (1901–1983), American jurist and politician in Colorado
- John Carroll (Ohio politician) (died 1985), member of the Ohio House of Representatives
- John Carroll (Manitoba politician) (1921–1986), Canadian politician in Manitoba
- John Carroll (Hawaii politician) (1929–2021), member of the Hawaii Senate and House of Representatives
- John Carroll (trade unionist) (active 1969–1990), Irish trade unionist and senator
- John Chafee (1922–1999), American politician
- John Chong (beekeeper), Singaporean beekeeper
- Calvin Coolidge (John Calvin Coolidge Jr., 1872–1933), American politician and lawyer, 30th President of the United States from 1923 to 1929
- John Tyler Cooper (1844–1912), American politician
- John R. Culbreath (1926–2013), American politician
- John Curtin (1885–1945), Australian politician, served as the 14th prime minister of Australia from 1941 until his death in 1945
- John F. Cusack (1937–2014), American politician from Massachusetts
- John Cusack (Australian politician) (1868–1956), Australian politician
- John Custis (1678–1749), North American Colonial British politician
- John Parke Custis (1754–1781), son of Martha Washington
- John Davies (British businessman) (1916–1979), British businessman, director-general of the CBI, and Conservative MP and cabinet minister
- John Bennett Dawson (1798–1845), American politician
- John N. Dempsey (1915–1989), Irish-American politician
- John E. Develin (1820–1888), American lawyer and politician
- John Diehl (politician) (born 1965), American politician
- John Dodd (Reading MP) (1717–1782), English politician
- John Driscoll (Montana politician) (born 1946), American writer and politician
- John J. Droney (1911–1989), American politician
- John Porter East (1931–1986), American Republican U.S. senator
- John Edgar (politician) (1750–1832), Irish-American pioneer and politician
- John Edwards
- Johan Elferink (born 1965), Australian politician
- John Patton Erwin (1795–1857), American Whig politician
- John De Saram (born 1929), Permanent Representative of Sri Lanka to the United Nations from 1998 to 2002
- John Fetterman (born 1969), American politician, U.S. Senator from Pennsylvania
- John F. Fitzgerald (1863–1950), American politician
- John Garang (1945–2005), Sudanese politician and revolutionary leader
- John P. Garfield (born 1949), American member of the Michigan House of Representatives
- John Nance Garner (1868–1967), American vice president
- John Glen (mayor of Atlanta) (1809–1895), mayor of Atlanta in 1855
- John Glenn (Alberta) (1833–1886), early Alberta settler
- John Glenn (1921–2016) American politician and astronaut
- John Thomas Glenn (1845–1899), mayor of Atlanta from 1889 to 1891
- John Glen (politician) (born 1974), British politician
- John Gomomo (1945–2008), South African Unionist and activist
- John Elliot Goodenow (1812–1902), American politician
- John H. Hager (1936–2020), American politician
- John Henry Hager (Iowa politician) (1871–1952), American politician
- John Church Hamilton (1792–1882), American historian, biographer, and lawyer
- John P. Harllee (1942–2017), American politician
- John Willie Kofi Harlley (1919–1980s), Ghanaian senior police officer and politician
- John Joseph Harper (1951–1988), Canadian aboriginal leader
- John Harrison (diplomat), 17th-century English diplomat
- John Harrison (died 1669) (1590–1669), English politician who sat in the House of Commons as MP for Lancaster variously between 1640 and 1669
- John Harrison (Canadian politician) (1908–1964), member of Parliament for Meadow Lake, Saskatchewan
- John Harrison (mayor), mayor of North Tyneside, England
- John Scott Harrison (1804–1878), American Congressman for Ohio, 1853–1857; son of President William Henry Harrison and the father of President Benjamin Harrison
- John Hart (Canadian politician) (1879–1957), 23rd premier of British Columbia
- John Isaac Heard (1787–1862), Irish Member of the UK Parliament for Kinsale
- John T. Heard (1840–1927), American politician
- John Henry, Margrave of Moravia (1322–1375), Royal family member of the Holy Roman Empire
- John Henry (Maryland politician) (1750–1798), U.S. senator from and governor of Maryland
- John Vernon Henry (1767–1829), American politician, New York State comptroller
- John Flournoy Henry (1793–1873), U.S. representative from Kentucky
- John Henry (representative) (1800–1882), U.S. representative from Illinois
- John Snowdon Henry (1824–1896), British politician from South-East Lancashire
- J. L. Henry (John Lane Henry, 1831–1907), Supreme Court of Texas judge
- John Henry (Australian politician) (1834–1912), Tasmanian House of Assembly member and treasurer of Tasmania
- John Henry (Ontario politician) (born 1960), Canadian politician, mayor of Oshawa, Ontario
- John Henry (Cook Islands politician), Cook Islander politician
- John Hickenlooper (born 1952), American politician
- John Hicks (Nova Scotia politician) (1715–1790), land agent and politician in Nova Scotia
- John Hikel, American politician and New Hampshire state legislator
- John Hill (North Carolina politician) (1797–1861), United States Representative from North Carolina
- John Y. Hill (1799–1859), American builder and Kentucky state legislator
- John Hill (Australian politician) (born 1949), member of the South Australian House of Assembly
- John Hill (Florida politician) (born 1931), American politician
- John Hill (New Jersey politician) (1821–1884), United States Representative from New Jersey
- John Hill (Texas politician) (1923–2007), American lawyer and politician
- John Hill (Virginia politician) (1800–1880), United States Representative from Virginia
- John Fremont Hill (1855–1912), governor of Maine
- John Jerome Hill (1918–1986), American politician
- John Philip Hill (1879–1941), United States Representative from Maryland
- John H. Holdridge (1924–2001), U.S. Ambassador to Singapore and Indonesia
- John T. Hoffman (1828–1888), Governor of New York from 1869 to 1872
- John Hoffman (Minnesota politician) (born 1965), Minnesota state senator
- John Hopkins (Bristol MP), member of the English House of Commons in 1601
- John Hopkins (died 1732), English merchant, Member of Parliament (MP) for St Ives 1710–15 and Ilchester 1715–22
- John Hopkins (South Carolina politician), lieutenant governor of South Carolina, 1806–1808
- John Patrick Hopkins (1858–1918), mayor of Chicago 1893–1895
- John Rout Hopkins (1829–1897), politician of Victoria, Australia
- Sir John Hopkins, 1st Baronet (1863–1946), English Conservative Party politician, Member of Parliament (MP) for St Pancras South East 1918–23 and 1924–29
- John Marquis Hopkins (1870–1912), Australian politician
- John W. Hopp (1868–1931), American politician
- John Horgan (born 1959), Canadian politician and the current Premier of British Columbia
- John Horgan (Australian politician) (1834–1907), Australian politician, Western Australia MLC
- John Horgan (Irish politician) (1876–1955), Irish politician
- John Horgan (Irish nationalist) (1881–1967), Irish Cork-born nationalist politician, solicitor and author
- John Hume (1937–2020), Irish nationalist and Nobel Peace Prize laureate
- John Herbert Ilangatileke, Sri Lankan Sinhala member of the 2nd State Council of Ceylon for Puttalam
- John Ince (activist) (born 1952), Canadian activist, politician, author, and lawyer
- John Howard (born 1939) Australian politician, served as the 25th prime minister of Australia from 1996 to 2007
- John Jansen (politician) (born 1947), Canadian politician
- John Jay (1745–1829), American politician, statesman, revolutionary, diplomat, and the first Chief Justice of the United States
- John Johnson (Ohio congressman) (1805–1867), politician
- John A. Johnson (Minnesota politician) (1883–1962), Minnesota politician
- John A. Johnson (Wisconsin), Wisconsin state assemblyman from Madison
- John Albert Johnson (1861–1909), 16th governor of Minnesota
- John Anders Johnson (1832–1901), Wisconsin state senator
- John E. Johnson (Brandon) (1873–1951), Wisconsin state assemblyman from Brandon, Wisconsin
- John E. Johnson (Utica) (fl. circa 1868), Wisconsin state assemblyman from Utica, Wisconsin
- John J. Johnson (1926–2016), Missouri state senator
- John Warren Johnson (1929–2023), Minnesota state legislator
- John Telemachus Johnson (1788–1856), U.S. Representative from Kentucky
- John Johnson (Kansas City mayor) (1816–1903), mayor of Kansas City, Missouri
- J. Neely Johnson (1825–1872), California politician and politician
- John Johnson (b. 1833) (1833–1892), Wisconsin State Assemblyman
- John Johnson (Ohio state representative) (born 1937), member of the Ohio House of Representatives
- John Johnson Sr. (1770–1824), Chancellor of Maryland
- John Johnson Jr. (1798–1856), Chancellor of Maryland
- John Johnson (Indiana judge) (1776–1817), associate justice of the Indiana Supreme Court
- John T. Johnson (Oklahoma judge) (1856–1935), associate justice of the Oklahoma Supreme Court
- John B. Johnson (politician) (1885–1985), American politician in the South Dakota State Senate
- John Ramsey Johnson, associate judge of the Superior Court of the District of Columbia
- J. B. Johnson (Florida politician) (1868–1940), 23rd Florida Attorney General
- John S. Johnson (North Dakota politician) (1854–1941), member of the North Dakota House of Representatives
- John F. Kennedy (1917–1963), American politician, served as the 35th President of the United States from 1961 to 1963
- John Kerry (born 1943), American politician and diplomat who served as the 68th United States Secretary of State from 2013 to 2017
- John Lionel Kotelawala (1895–1980), Prime Minister of Sri Lanka from 1953 to 1956
- John Lansing Jr. (1754–1829), American politician who disappeared
- John Lee (government official) (born 1957), Hong Kong politician
- John Limbert (born 1943), American diplomat
- John H. Long (political candidate), Canadian political figure
- John B. Macy (1799–1856), U.S. Representative from Wisconsin
- John Macy (1917–1986), United States Government administrator and civil servant
- John Mahama (born 1958), Ghanaian politician and former president of Ghana
- John Major (born 1943), Prime Minister of the United Kingdom from 1990 to 1997
- John Major (17th-century English MP), English politician and Member of Parliament
- Sir John Major, 1st Baronet (1698–1781), English merchant and Member of Parliament
- John Cyril Malloy (1930–2014), American politician
- John Manley (born 1950), Canadian politician who served as the eighth deputy prime minister of Canada from 2002 to 2003
- John S. Marmaduke (1833–1887), American politician
- John McCain (1936–2018), American statesman and US Navy officer, United States Senator for Arizona from 1987 to 2018
- John McConnel (1806–1899), Australian politician
- John Foster McCreight (1827–1913), first premier of British Columbia
- John Duncan McRae, member of the Legislative Assembly of British Columbia, 1949–1952
- John J. McRae, American politician in Mississippi
- John McRae (British Columbia politician), member of the Legislative Assembly of British Columbia, 1920–1924
- John Moore (Louisiana politician) (1788–1867), American statesman
- John Marks Moore (1853–1901) Secretary of State of Texas, 1887–1891
- John Matthew Moore (1862–1940) American congressman
- John Fru Ndi (born 1941), Cameroonian politician
- John Verdun Newton (1916–1944), Australian politician
- John Nilson, Canadian politician
- John Nkadimeng (1927–2020), South African politician and anti-apartheid activist
- John Michael Parks (born 1946), Canadian politician
- John Paul (judge) (1839–1901), American politician and judge
- John Paul Jr. (judge) (1883–1964), American politician and judge
- John Paul (minister) (1795–1873), Scottish minister
- John Paul (pioneer) (1758–1830), American politician and city founder
- John Prescott (Indiana politician), American politician
- John Gladstone Rajakulendran (1907–1950), Sri Lankan Tamil teacher and politician
- John Reagan (New Hampshire politician) (born 1946), New Hampshire politician
- John Henninger Reagan (1818–1905), American politician
- John Roberts (born 1955), American lawyer and jurist who serves as Chief Justice of the United States
- John Robbins (congressman) (1808–1880), American congressman from Pennsylvania
- John J. Robison (1824–1897), Michigan state politician and mayor of Ann Arbor
- John Robson (politician) (1824–1892), Canadian politician, who served as the ninth premier of British Columbia
- John Sedensky (1935–2020), American politician
- John Senhouse Goldie-Taubman (1838–1898), Manx politician
- John Sidoti, Australian independent politician
- John Streltzer (1901–1985), Colorado legislator
- John Suiter, New Hampshire legislator
- John Tholl (born 1944), New Hampshire legislator
- John H. Tolan (1877–1947), American politician and lawyer
- John H. Trumbull (1873–1961), American politician who served as the 70th Governor of Connecticut from 1925 to 1931
- John V. Tunney (1934–2018), American politician
- John Herbert Turner (1834–1923), 11th premier of British Columbia
- John Tyler (1790–1862), tenth president of the United States
- John Tyler Sr., 15th governor of Virginia, United States District Judge of the United States District Court for the District of Virginia, father of John Tyler
- John Valera, American politician from New Hampshire
- John Van Buren, United States lawyer, official, politician, son of Martin Van Buren
- John Virgoe, British diplomat
- John Walker (Arkansas politician) (1937–2019), member of the Arkansas House of Representatives
- John Walker (Missouri politician) (1770–1838), State Treasurer of Missouri
- John Walker (Virginia politician) (1744–1809), U.S. Senator, public official, and soldier
- John A. Walker (Iowa politician) (1912–2012), American politician
- John M. Walker Jr. (born 1940), chief judge of the U.S. Court of Appeals for the Second Circuit
- John M. Walker (Pennsylvania politician) (1905–1976), Pennsylvania State Senator and lieutenant-gubernatorial nominee
- John Randall Walker (1874–1942), U.S. Representative from Georgia
- John Smith Walker (1826–1893), Minister of Finance of the Kingdom of Hawaii
- John Williams Walker (1783–1823), U.S. Senator from Alabama
- John Crompton Weems (1777–1862), American politician
- John Weir (politician) (1904–1995), Australian politician
- John Wemyss, 1st Earl of Wemyss (1586–1649), Scottish politician
- John Yakabuski (born 1957), Canadian politician
- John Geesnell Yap (born 1977), Filipino politician
- John Yap (born 1959), Canadian politician
- John Young (died 1589) (by 1519–1589), of Bristol, MP for Devizes, West Looe, etc.
- John Young (MP for Marlborough), in 1559, MP for Marlborough
- John Young (MP for New Shoreham) (fl. 1586–1597), MP for New Shoreham, Sussex
- John Allan Young (1895–1961), politician in Saskatchewan, Canada
- John Andrew Young (1916–2002), American politician from Texas
- John Duncan Young (1823–1910), US congressman from Kentucky
- John Young, 1st Baron Lisgar (1807–1876), UK MP, NSW Governor, Canadian Governor General
- John Young (Canadian politician) (1811–1878), member of the Canadian House of Commons
- John Young (governor) (1802–1852), Governor of New York
- John Young (advisor) (c. 1742–1835), British-born government advisor of Kamehameha I
- John Young (Australian politician) (1842–1893), New South Wales politician
- John Young (judge), Federal Court of Australia judge
- John Young (jurist) (1919–2008), Australian jurist
- John Young (Scottish politician) (1930–2011), Conservative and Unionist Member of the Scottish Parliament
- John Young (seigneur) (c. 1759–1819), Scottish-born Canadian land entrepreneur, jurist, and politician
- John Darling Young (1910–1988), Lord Lieutenant of Buckinghamshire, 1969–1984
- John M. Young (1926–2010), American politician from Wisconsin
- John Young (Indiana politician), American politician
- John Young (New Brunswick politician, born 1841) (1841–1907), Canadian politician
- John Young (New Brunswick politician, born 1854) (1854–1934), Canadian politician

=== Royalty ===
- John, King of England (1166–1216)
- John of Brienne (1170–1237), King of Jerusalem and Latin Emperor
- John of Bohemia, (1296–1346), Count of Luxembourg and King of Bohemia
- John of Eltham, Earl of Cornwall (1316–1336), second son of Edward II
- John of Gaunt, 1st Duke of Lancaster (1340–1399), third son of Edward III
- John of Lancaster, 1st Duke of Bedford (1389–1435), second son of Henry IV
- John I of Aragon, (1350–1396), King of Aragon
- John II of Aragon, (1398–1479), King of Aragon
- John I of Castile, (1358–1390), King of Castile
- John II of Castile, (1405–1454), King of Castile
- John I of France, (1316), King of France and Navarre
- John II of France, (1319–1364), King of France
- John Sigismund Zápolya, (1540–1571), King of Hungary
- John I of Münsterberg, (1380–1284), Duke of Münsterberg
- John III of Navarre, (1469–1516), King of Navarre
- John I Albert (1459–1501), King of Poland
- John II Casimir Vasa (1609–1672), King of Poland
- John III Sobieski (1629–1696), King of Poland
- John I of Portugal, (1357–1433), King of Portugal
- John II of Portugal, (1455–1495), King of Portugal
- John III of Portugal, (1502–1557), King of Portugal
- John IV of Portugal, (1604–1656), King of Portugal
- John V of Portugal, (1689–1750), King of Portugal
- John VI of Portugal, (1767–1826), King of Portugal
- John, Duke of Valencia de Campos (1349–1396), son of Peter I of Portugal and Inês de Castro
- John, Constable of Portugal (1400–1442), son of John I of Portugal
- John I of Sweden, (1201–1222), King of Sweden
- John II of Sweden, (1455–1513), King of Denmark and King of Sweden during the Kalmar Union
- John III of Sweden, (1537–1592), King of Sweden
- Charles XIV John, (1763–1844), King of Sweden and King of Norway, first king in the Bernadotte dynasty
- Prince Alexander John of Wales (1871), third son and youngest child of Edward VII
- Prince John of the United Kingdom (1905–1919), youngest son of King George V

=== Science ===
- John Abercrombie (physician) (1780–1844), Scottish physician and philosopher
- John Adams (physicist) (1920–1984), British accelerator physicist
- John Couch Adams (1819–1892), British mathematician and astronomer
- John Franklin Adams (1843–1912), British amateur astronomer and author of stellar maps
- John Stacey Adams, behavioral psychologist known for equity theory
- John Till Adams (1748–1786), English Quaker physician
- John Alderson (physician) (1758–1829), English physician
- John Lawrence Angel (1915–1986), British-American biological anthropologist
- John Baker (biologist) (1900–1984), British biologist and anthropologist
- John Baker, Baron Baker (1901–1985), British engineer
- John Gilbert Baker (1834–1920), British botanist
- John Norman Leonard Baker (1893–1971), British geographer
- John Holland Baker (1841–1930), New Zealand surveyor and public servant
- John Bartram (1699–1777), American botanist
- John Berkenhout (1726–1791), English physician
- John Bevan (diver) (1943–2020), British naval officer, underwater diver and academic
- John Roosevelt Boettiger, grandson of Franklin D. Roosevelt
- Sir John Carroll (astronomer) (1899–1974), British astronomer
- John Alexander Carroll (died 2000), American history professor
- John Bissell Carroll (1916–2003), American cognitive scientist
- John L. Carroll, American legal academic
- John M. Carroll (information scientist) (active since born 1950), American information scientist
- John F. Clark (engineer), American aerospace engineer and NASA director
- John Clauser (born 1942), American theoretical and experimental physicist
- John Clements Davis (born 1938), American geologist
- John W. Crowley (1899–1974), American engineer and early NASA test pilot
- John Dee (1527–1608 or 1609), English mathematician, astronomer, astrologer, teacher, occultist, and alchemist
- John P. Ferraris (born 1947), American chemist and professor
- John Fothergill (physician) (1712–1780), English physician
- John Goodsir (1814–1867), Scottish anatomist and a pioneer in the formulation of cell theory
- John Henry (toxicologist) (1939–2007), English toxicologist
- John Hill (botanist) (1716–1775), English botanist, editor, journalist, and novelist
- John Christopher Columbus Hill (1828–1904), American engineer
- John Edwards Hill (1928–1997), British mammalogist
- Sir John McGregor Hill (1921–2008), British nuclear physicist and administrator
- John Hill (physician) (1931–1972), American plastic surgeon
- John R. Lukacs (born 1947), American anthropologist
- John McKean (ornithologist) (1941–1996), Australian ornithologist
- John Mearsheimer (born 1947), American political scientist
- John von Neumann (1903–1957), Hungarian-American mathematician, physicist, computer scientist, engineer and polymath
- John Robbins (congressman) (1808–1880), American congressman from Pennsylvania
- John Sherwen (1749–1826), English physician
- John Snow (1813–1858), English physician
- John Tomaszewski, American pathologist
- John G. Trump, uncle of Donald Trump
- John Truss (born 1947), British mathematician
- John Van Denburgh (1872–1924), American herpetologist
- John Weir (geologist) (1896–1978), Scottish geologist and palaeontologist
- John Wood (surgeon) (1825–1891), British surgeon at King's College Hospital
- John Henry Wood (1841–1914), English entomologist
- John L. Wood (born 1964), American chemist
- John Ligertwood Paterson (1820–1882), Scottish medical doctor known for working in Bahia, Brazil
- John S. Fossey, British chemist and professor at the University of Birmingham
- John Medley Wood (1827–1915), South African botanist
- John Nicholas Wood, British neurobiologist
- John Turtle Wood (1821–1890), British architect, engineer, and archaeologist
- John Venn (1834-1923), British mathematician and logician known for introducing Venn diagrams

=== Sport ===
- John (footballer) (John Victor Maciel Furtado, born 1996), Brazilian footballer
- John Abercrombie (cricketer) (1817–1892), English cricketer
- John H. Adams (jockey) (1914–1995), American Hall of Fame jockey
- John Adams (basketball) (1917–1979), All-American basketball player from Arkansas
- John Adams (drummer) (1951–2023), perennial attendee of Cleveland Indians baseball home games
- John Adams (golfer) (born 1954), American professional golfer
- John Adams (judoka) (born 1960), Dominican Republic judoka
- John Adams (ice hockey, born 1920) (1920–1996), Canadian ice hockey winger in the NHL with the Montreal Canadiens
- John Adams (ice hockey, born 1946), Canadian ice hockey goaltender
- John Aeta (born 2000), Solomon Islands footballer
- John Albert (canoeist) (born 1949), British slalom canoer
- John Albert (fighter) (born 1986), American mixed martial artist
- John Albert (ice hockey) (born 1989), American ice hockey player
- John Alderton (American football) (1931–2013), American professional football defensive lineman
- John Andrews (American football) (born 1948), American football player
- John Anson (born 1949), Canadian retired professional wrestler
- John Askey (born 1964), English professional football manager and former player
- John Babcock (wrestler) (fl. 1904), American Olympic wrestler
- John Bacon (footballer) (born 1973), Irish footballer
- John Bacon (cricketer) (1871–1942), English cricketer
- John Badham (sportscaster) (1937–2016), Canadian sportscaster and radio announcer
- John Bailey (footballer, born 1950), English footballer and chairman
- John Bailey (footballer, born 1957), English footballer
- John Bailey (footballer, born 1969), English footballer
- John Bailey (rugby league) (born 1954), Australian rugby league footballer and coach
- John Bailey (English cricketer) (born 1940), English cricketer
- John Bailey (New Zealand cricketer) (born 1941), New Zealand cricketer
- John Bartram (athlete) (1925–2014), Australian Olympic track and field athlete
- John Bates (American football) (born 1997), American football player
- John Beale (footballer) (1930–1995), English footballer
- John Beedell (1933–2014), New Zealand-born, Canadian sprint canoer
- John Biolo (1916–2003), American football player
- John Boie (born 1991), American wheelchair basketball player
- John Bonica (1917–1994), Italian professional wrestler
- John Brannon (American football) (born 1998), American football player
- John Bristor (born 1955), American football player
- John Brown (wide receiver) (born 1990), American football wide receiver
- John Bruhin (1964–2022), American football guard
- John Cameron (athlete) (1881–1953), Canadian athlete
- John Cameron (footballer, born 1868) (1868–1???), Scottish footballer
- John Cameron (footballer, born 1872) (1872–1935), Scottish footballer, played for Queen's Park, Everton & Scotland; player-manager for Tottenham Hotspur
- John Cameron (footballer, born 1875) (1875–1944), Scottish footballer
- Jock Cameron (footballer) (1881–1???), played for St. Mirren, Blackburn Rovers and Scotland
- John Cameron (footballer, born 1929), English footballer for Motherwell and Bradford Park Avenue
- John Cameron (New Zealand cricketer) (1898–1988), New Zealand cricketer
- John Cameron (Rangers footballer), played for Rangers and made one appearance for Scotland in 1886
- John Cameron (West Indian cricketer) (1914–2000), West Indian cricketer
- John Joseph Cameron (1882–1954), West Indian cricketer
- John Cena (born 1977), American professional wrestler, actor, television presenter and rapper
- John Childs (cricketer) (born 1951), English cricketer
- John Condrone (1960–2020), American professional wrestler
- John Cone (born 1974), American professional wrestling referee
- John Cuffe (1880–1931), Australian-born English first-class cricketer
- John Cusack (hurler) (1925–2002), Irish hurler, active in the 1940s and 1950s
- John Day (cricketer, born 1881) (1881–1949), English cricketer
- John Diehl (American football) (1936–2012), American football player
- Johnny Dodd (rugby league), rugby league footballer of the 1950s for New Zealand, and Wellington
- John-John Dohmen (born 1988), Belgian field hockey player
- John Ducey (baseball) (1908–1983), Canadian baseball executive and umpire
- John Duffy (soccer), U.S. soccer player at 1928 Summer Olympics
- John Edgar (English footballer) (1930–2006), English footballer
- John Edgar (Scottish footballer), Scottish footballer
- John John Florence (born 1992), American surfer
- John Hawley Edwards (1850–1893), footballer; a founder of Welsh Football Association
- John Dunlop Edwards (1860–1911), Jack Edwards, Australian cricketer
- John Edwards (footballer, born 1875) (1875–1???), English footballer
- John Edwards (Canadian football) (1912–2005), Canadian football player
- John Edwards (cricketer, born 1928) (1928–2002), Australian cricketer
- John Edwards (Barbadian cricketer) (1909–1976), Barbadian cricketer
- John Edwards (Australian footballer) (born 1942), Australian rules footballer
- John Edwards (canoeist) (born 1954), Canadian sprint canoer
- John Edwards (basketball) (born 1981), American basketball player
- John Edwards (racing driver) (born 1991), American racing driver
- John Eustace (born 1979), English professional football manager and former player
- John Elway (born), American professional NFL football player
- John Farragher (born 1957), Australian former professional rugby league footballer
- John Ferguson Sr. (1938–2007) American professional ice hockey player and executive
- John Fitzpatrick (athlete) (1907–1989), Canadian athlete who competed in the 1928 Summer Olympics
- John Franklin (cyclist), British cyclist
- John Franklin (footballer) (1924–2005), English football forward
- John "Johnny" Gargano (born 1987), American professional wrestler
- John Garlington (1946–2000), American football linebacker
- John Gold (born 1988), American football player
- John Goodner (1944–2005), American football coach
- John Gunter (football manager), American football manager
- John Heard (basketball) (born 1939), Australian Olympic basketball player
- John Henderson (darts player) (born 1973), Scottish darts player
- John Henry (catcher) (1889–1941), American baseball catcher
- John Henry (footballer) (born 1971), Scottish footballer
- John Henry (outfielder/pitcher) (1863–1939), American baseball outfielder/pitcher
- John Herdman (born 1975), English soccer manager
- John Hicks (American football) (1951–2016), lineman
- John Hicks (baseball) (born 1989), American professional baseball catcher and first baseman
- John Hicks (cricketer) (1850–1912), English first-class cricketer
- John Hicks (field hockey) (1938–2021), New Zealand field hockey player
- John Ethan Hill (1865–1941), American mathematician and college football coach
- John Hill (Scottish footballer) (fl. 1891–1892), Scottish footballer
- Johnny Hill (footballer) (1884–1???), Scottish footballer
- Jack Hill (footballer, born 1897) (1897–1972), English football player and manager
- John Hill (rugby union) (fl. 1925), Australian rugby union player
- John Hill (rugby league), rugby league footballer of the 1940s and 1950s
- John Hill (American football) (1950–2018), American football player
- John Hill (New Zealand footballer) (born 1950), Irish-born New Zealand footballer
- John Mac Hill (1925–1995), Australian rules footballer for Collingwood
- John Tye Hill (born 1982), American football player
- John Hill (boat racer) (1933–1993), British powerboat racer
- John Hill (ice hockey) (born 1960), American ice hockey coach
- John Hill (wrestler) (1941–2010), Canadian professional wrestler
- John Hindley (born 1965), real name of retired British professional wrestler Johnny Smith
- John Hoffman (defensive end) (born 1943), American football defensive end
- John Hoffman (running back) (1925–1987), American football running back
- John Hoffman (baseball) (1943–2001), Major League Baseball catcher
- John Hopkins (cricketer) (born 1953), former Welsh cricketer
- John Hopkins (American football) (born c. 1969), American football placekicker
- John Hopkins (motorcyclist) (born 1983), American motorcycle racer
- John Horgan (hurler) (1950–2016), Irish sportsperson
- John G. Horgan (1866–1921), pocket billiards (pool) player
- John Houseman (baseball) (1870–1922), European Major League Baseball player
- John Hui (tennis) (born 1978), Hong Kong former professional tennis player
- John Hurd (1914–2001), American fencer
- John Isaacs (1915–2009), Panamanian-American basketball player
- John Isner (born 1985), American professional tennis player
- John Jiles (born 2000), American football player
- John Kieper (1932–2022), American racing driver and team owner
- John Kiley (1912–1993), organist at Fenway Park from 1953 to 1989 and at the Boston Garden from 1941 to 1984
- John Kiley (baseball) (1859–1940), Major League Baseball outfielder and pitcher
- John Klug (born 1965), Australian rules former professional footballer
- John Kronus (1969–2007), American professional wrestler
- John Lindsay (Paralympian) (born 1970), Australian Paralympic athlete
- John Laurinaitis (born 1962), American retired professional wrestler
- John Layfield (born 1966), American retired professional wrestler
- John Loung (born 1986), Hong Kong boccia player
- John Maczuzak (1941–2013), American steel industry leader and football player
- John Madden (1936–2021), American football coach and television announcer
- John Madden (hurler) (born 1968), Irish hurling selector and player
- John Madden (ice hockey) (born 1973), Canadian ice hockey player
- John Major (cricketer) (1861–1930), English cricketer
- John Major (rugby union) (born 1940), New Zealand rugby union player
- John Matuszak (1950–1989), American football defensive end
- John McFall (athlete) (born 1981), British Paralympic sprinter
- John McMullin (baseball) (1849–1881), American baseball player
- John McMullin (golfer), American golfer
- John McSeveney (1931–2020), Scottish footballer and manager
- John Allan McVeigh (1925–2008), Canadian football player
- John P. Metras (1909–1982), American coach of Canadian football
- John Minton (1948–1995), real name of American professional wrestler Big John Studd
- John Moeti (1967–2023), South African professional footballer
- John John Molina (born 1965), Puerto Rican boxer
- John Morrison (wrestler) (born 1979), American professional wrestler
- John Moll (1913–1942), English rugby union player
- John Morkel (1928–2010), South African born Rhodesian international rugby union player
- John Mobley Jr. (born 2005), American basketball player
- John Moshoeu (1965–2015), South African professional footballer
- John Wayne Murdoch (born 1988), American professional wrestler
- John Naber (born 1956), American former competitive swimmer
- John Hunter Nemechek (born 1997), American racing driver
- John Nestor (American football) (born 2005), American football player
- John Nogowski (born 1993), American baseball player
- John Nord (born 1959), American retired professional wrestler
- John Paul (footballer), 19th century British footballer
- John Paul Sr. (racing driver) (1939–????), American automobile racing driver
- John Paul Jr. (racing driver) (1960–2020), American automobile racing driver
- John Pearson (cricketer) (1915–2007), English cricketer
- John Pearson (curler) (active 1959), Scottish curler
- John Pearson (footballer, born 1868) (1868–1931), English football player and referee
- John Pearson (footballer, born 1892) (1892–1937), Scottish football player
- John Pearson (footballer, born 1896) (1896–1979), English football player
- John Pearson (footballer, born 1935), English football player
- John Pearson (footballer, born 1946), English football player
- John Pearson (footballer, born 1963), English football player
- John Pearson (gymnast) (1902–1984), American gymnast
- John Pearson (sport shooter) (1926–1994), British Olympic shooter
- John Pesek (1894–1978), American professional wrestler
- John Maunsell Richardson (1846–1912), English cricketer, Member of Parliament and twice winner of the English Grand National
- John Richardson (Derbyshire cricketer) (1856–1940), English cricketer for Derbyshire County Cricket Club
- John Richardson (tennis) (1873–1???), South African Olympic tennis player
- Mick Richardson (John Mettham Richardson, 1874–1920), English footballer active in the 1890s
- John Richardson (Yorkshire cricketer) (1908–1985), English cricketer for Yorkshire County Cricket Club
- John Richardson (South African cricketer) (born 1935), South African cricketer for North Eastern Transvaal
- Jock Richardson (1906–1986), Scottish footballer
- John Richardson (American football) (born 1945), American football player for the Miami Dolphins
- John Richardson (baseball), American baseball player
- John Richardson (footballer, born 1949) (1949–1984), English football player for Brentford, Fulham and Aldershot
- John Richardson (footballer, born 1966), English football player for Colchester
- John Richardson (rower) (born 1944), Canadian Olympic rower
- John Roberts (footballer, born 1956), Australian rules footballer who played for South Melbourne/Sydney Swans and in South Australia
- John Roberts (footballer, born 1881) (1881–1956), Australian rules footballer who played for South Melbourne
- John Roberts Jr. (billiards player) (1847–1919), player of English billiards
- John Roberts (Lancashire cricketer) (1933–2019), English cricketer
- John Roberts (Somerset cricketer) (born 1949), Somerset cricketer
- John Roberts (footballer, born 1857) (1857–1???), Welsh (from Llangollen) international footballer
- John Roberts (footballer, born 1858) (1858–1???), Welsh international footballer
- John Roberts (footballer, born 1885) (1885–19??), English footballer who played for Wolverhampton Wanderers and Bristol Rovers
- John Roberts (footballer, born 1887) (1887–19??), English-born footballer active in Italy for Milan and Modena
- John Roberts (footballer, born 1891) (1891–19??), Scottish footballer
- John Roberts (footballer, born 1944), Australian soccer player
- John Roberts (footballer, born 1946) (1946–2016), Welsh international footballer who played for Wrexham and Arsenal
- John Roberts (hurler) (1895–1987), Irish hurler
- John Roberts (rower) (born 1953), British Olympic rower
- John Roberts (rugby player) (1906–1965), Welsh rugby player
- John Roberts (American football) (1920–2012), American football, wrestling and track coach
- Jack Robson (football manager) (1860–1922), English full-time secretary manager of football clubs, including Middlesbrough and Manchester United
- Jack Robson (footballer), English footballer
- John Robson (Australian footballer) (1933–2011), played with Richmond and St Kilda in the VFL
- John Robson (footballer, born 1950) (1950–2004), English football full-back for Derby County and Aston Villa
- John Robson (athlete) (born 1957), British middle-distance runner
- John Robson (canoeist), British canoe sailor
- Doug Robson (1942–2020), born John Douglas Robson and listed as John Robson in some databases, English football centre half for Darlington
- John de Saulles (1878–1917), American football player and coach
- John Samuel Shenker (born 1998), American football player
- John Silver (wrestler), American professional wrestler
- John Soares (racing driver) (1918–2007), American racing driver
- John Soares Jr. (1942–2022), American racing driver
- John Stephens Jr. (born 1999), American football player
- John Stones (born 1994), English footballer
- John Tatum (wrestler) (born 1959), American retired professional wrestler
- John Tavares (born 1990), Canadian ice hockey player
- John Tenta (1963–2006), Canadian professional wrestler and sumo wrestler
- John Terry (born 1980), English professional football coach and former player
- John Terry (baseball) (1877–1958), Major League Baseball pitcher who played for the Detroit Tigers
- John Terry (gridiron football) (born 1968), American football player
- John Terry (weightlifter) (1908–1970), American Olympic weightlifter
- John Thompson (basketball) (1941–2020), American college basketball coach
- John Thompson III (born 1966), American men's national basketball team
- John Kennedy Tod (1852–1925), Scottish rugby union player
- John Todd (footballer) (born 1938), Australian rules football player and coach
- John Todd (rugby league), rugby league footballer of the 1910s and 1920s
- John Tolos (1930–2009), Canadian professional wrestler
- John Tortorella (born 1958), American professional ice hockey coach and former player
- John Voight (athlete) (1926–1993), American sprinter
- John Weir (footballer), Scottish footballer
- John Williams (mixed martial artist) (1940–2015), Canadian retired mixed martial artist
- John Wood (baseball) (1872–1929), baseball player
- John Wood (canoeist) (1950–2013), Canadian Olympic flatwater canoer
- John Wood (racing driver) (born 1952), CART driver
- John Wood (rugby league) (born 1956), English rugby league footballer who played for Great Britain
- John Young (first baseman) (1949–2016), American baseball first baseman
- John Young (cricketer, born 1863) (1863–1933), English cricketer
- John Young (cricketer, born 1876) (1876–1913), English cricketer
- John Young (cricketer, born 1884) (1884–1960), English cricketer
- John Young (cyclist) (1936–2013), Australian cyclist
- John Young (field hockey) (born 1934), Canadian Olympic hockey player
- John Young (footballer, born 1888) (1888–1915), Scottish footballer
- John Young (footballer, born 1889) (1889–1???), Scottish footballer
- John Young (footballer, born 1891) (1891–1947), Scottish footballer
- John Young (footballer, born 1951), Scottish footballer and manager
- John Young (footballer, born 1957), Scottish footballer (Denver Avalanche)
- John Young (ice hockey), American ice hockey and roller hockey player
- John Young (rugby union) (1937–2020), English rugby union player
- John Young (swimmer) (1917–2006), Bermudian swimmer
- John Zimmerman (figure skater) (born 1973), American professional pair skater and coach

=== Other occupations ===
- John O. Aalberg (1897–1984), Hollywood sound technician
- John Abercromby (monk) (fl. 1561), 16th-century Roman Catholic martyr, maybe fictitious
- John Samuel Agar (1773–1858), English portrait painter and engraver
- John Judson Ames (1821–1861), California Pioneer
- John Anderson (classical scholar) (1870–1952), Camden Professor of Ancient History at the University of Oxford
- John Anderson (escaped slave), American slave who escaped to Canada in the 1860s, leading to a famous extradition case
- John S. Apperson (1878–1963), General Electric engineer
- John Asman, American sound engineer
- John Willard Banks (1912–1988), American artist
- John N. Berry (1933–2020), American librarian
- John Billings (1918–2007), Australian physician
- John Shaw Billings (1838–1913), American librarian, building designer, and surgeon
- John Shaw Billings (editor) (1891–1975), first editor of Life magazine and first managing editor of Time-Life
- John de Borman (born 1954), French-born British cinematographer
- John Bowden (theologian) (1935–2010), English theologian and publisher
- John Bowen (pirate) (16??–1704), pirate of Créole origin active during the Golden Age of Piracy
- John Bozeman (1835–1867), American pioneer and frontiersman
- John J. Brooks, American lawman
- John Bush (set decorator), British set decorator
- John Buxton (ornithologist) (1912–1989), British scholar, university teacher, poet and an ornithologist
- John Cabot (c. 1450–c. 1500), Italian navigator and explorer
- John Cameron (farmer), Scottish farmer involved with ScotRail
- John E. Cameron (died 1852), American pioneer and politician
- John Cameron (1817–1878), executive officer and director-general of the Ordnance Survey
- John William Cameron (1841–1896), English brewer
- John Brewer Cameron, geodetic surveyor in Australia
- John Cameron (chief), Mississauga Ojibwa chief
- John Cantlie (born 1970), British war photographer and correspondent
- John F. Carroll (1932–1969), one of 23 known people in medical history to have reached a height of 8 feet
- John Casali, American sound engineer
- John Cashman (journalist) (died 1945), American war correspondent for the International News Service
- John Caulker (born 1970), Sierra Leonean political and social activist
- John Cavanagh (designer) (1914–2003), Irish couturier
- John Allen Chau (1991–2018), American evangelical Christian missionary
- John Filby Childs (1783–1853), English printer and political radical
- John Childs (historian) (born 1949), professor of military history
- John L. Childs (1899–1985), American educator and author
- John Chong (beekeeper), Singaporean beekeeper
- John Clavie (died 1607), Scottish apothecary
- John Climacus (579–649), Christian monk
- John Chaffee, American gold miner
- John W. Chaffee (born 1948), American historian
- John Chambers (make-up artist) (1922–2001), American make-up artist
- John Cotton Dana (1856–1929), American library and museum director
- John Charles Darke (1806–1844), English surveyor and explorer
- John Crowe (disambiguation), various people
- John Davidson (traveller) (1797–1836), English traveller in Africa
- John Davis (sculptor) (1936–1999), Australian sculptor
- John F. Davis (artist) (born 1958), Australian artist, painter and video editor
- John Philip Davis (1784–1862), British portrait and subject painter
- John Scarlett Davis (1804–1845), English painter
- John Dawson Dewhirst (1952–1978), British teacher
- John E. Douglas (born 1944/1945), American retired special agent
- John Price Durbin (1800–1876), Chaplain of the Senate, president of Dickinson College
- John of Egypt, Egyptian Saint and hermit
- John R. Ellis, American visual effects artist
- John M. Falcone (1967–2011), American police officer
- John Favara (1929–1983), American person missing since 1980
- John Louis Flateau (1950–2023), American political scientist, professor, civil rights advocate, and political strategist
- John Fortenberry, American film and television director
- John Gallagher (cartoonist) (1926–2005), American cartoonist and illustrator
- John Glavin (born 1943), American academic and Professor of English
- John Paul Getty Jr. (1932–2003), American philanthropist and book collector
- John Paul Getty III (1956–2011), American grandson of American oil tycoon J. Paul Getty
- John L. Gihon (1839–1878), Philadelphia photographer
- John Glenn (1921–2016), American Marine Corps aviator, engineer, astronaut, businessman, and politician
- John Gmeiner (1847–1915), American Roman Catholic clergyman
- John Goosey (died 2009), American murder victim
- John Graham (Canadian activist), Canadian former Native American activist
- John Gray (nightwatchman) (died 1858), owner of Greyfriars Bobby
- John Gregory (engineer) (1806–c.1848), English railway and naval engineer
- John Groth (1908–1988), Illustrator
- John F. Grundhofer (1939–2021), director of Donaldson Company
- John Gunther (public servant) (1910–1984), Australian public servant
- John Hancock (1737–1793), American Founding Father remembered for his large and stylish signature on the United States Declaration of Independence
- John Gordon Harris (1947–2019), Canadian policeman
- John Hartwell Harrison, M.D. (1909–1984), urologic surgeon
- John Harrison (director) (born 1948), writer, director, producer, and music composer
- John Harrison (Leeds) (1579–1656), benefactor of the Yorkshire town
- John C. Harrison (law professor), American law professor
- John Kent Harrison, television producer, director and writer
- John Leonard Harrison (1917–1972), British zoologist
- John Harrison (historian) (1847–1922), Scottish merchant, master tailor and historical author
- John Harrison (engraver) (1872–1954), British stamp engraver
- John Harrison (ice cream taster) (born 1942), American ice cream taster
- John B. Harrison (1861–1947), justice of the Oklahoma Supreme Court
- John Vernon Harrison (1892–1972), British structural geologist, explorer and cartographer
- John Henry (folklore), American folk hero whose existence is disputed
- John Henry (spy) (c. 1776–1853), British spy
- John Raymond Henry (1943–2022), American sculptor
- John Hejduk (1929–2000), American architect, artist, and educator
- John Hill (cartoonist) (1889–1974), New Zealand cartoonist
- John William Hill (1812–1879), British-born American artist
- John Hill (game designer) (1945–2015), American designer of Squad Leader and other wargames
- John Horgan (academic) (born 1940), Irish press ombudsman, former journalist, politician and professor
- John Horgan (journalist) (born 1953), American science journalist
- John Horgan (psychologist) (born 1974), Irish political psychologist, terrorism researcher, and professor
- John Horgan, chairman of the Western Australian Development Corporation
- John Hubley (1914–1977), American animation director, art director, producer and writer
- John Hurt (chaplain) (1752–1824), American Episcopal minister
- John Ibrahim, (born 1970), Kings Cross former nightclub owner in Australia
- John Inglis (shipbuilder) (1842–1919), Scottish engineer and shipbuilder
- John Jay (builder) (1805–1888), British stonemason and builder in the nineteenth century
- John Clarkson Jay (1808–1891), physician and grandson of John Jay, the American Founding Father and statesman
- John Jay (filmmaker) (1915–2000), American ski filmmaker
- John F. Kennedy Jr. (1960–1999), American political-family member and journalist, son of John F. Kennedy
- John Knight (seafarer) (died 1606), British explorer
- John Kostuck (1892–1960), American salesman, piano tuner, and legislator
- John Lake (journalist) (born 1930), American sports journalist and editor who disappeared in 1967
- John Layfield (theologian) (died 1617), English scholar and Bible translator
- John Lounsbery (1911–1976), American animator and director
- John A. List (born 1968), American economist at the University of Chicago
- John M. Lloyd (1835–1892), American police officer, tavern owner, and bricklayer, known for testifying in the Abraham Lincoln assassination conspiracy trials
- John Majhor (1953–2007), Canadian radio and television host
- John William Mackail (1859–1945), Scottish academic
- John Masius (born 1950), American screenwriter
- John Means (comedian), American stand-up comedian
- John James McCullough (born 1984), Canadian YouTuber, political commentator, and cartoonist
- John McMullin (silversmith) (1765–1843), American silversmith
- John McSweeney Jr. (1915–1999), American film editor
- John Middleton (giant) (1578–1623), English giant
- John Matthew Mitchell (1925–2019), British academic
- John Mosman (apothecary), apothecary at the Scottish court
- John Mosman (goldsmith), Scottish goldsmith based in Edinburgh
- John Mulaney (born 1982), American stand-up comedian
- John Dodo Nangkiriny (c. 1910–2003), Indigenous Australian cultural leader and artist
- John Elliott Neville, prisoner who died in 2019 after being restrained at the Forsyth County, North Carolina jail
- John Nevill, 3rd Earl of Abergavenny (1789–1845), English peer
- John Nevill, 5th Marquess of Abergavenny (1914–2000), British peer
- John Nevill, 10th Baron Bergavenny (c. 1614–1662), English peer
- John M. Newman, American academic, author and retired major in the United States Army
- John Notman (1810–1865), Scottish-American architect
- John Boyle O'Reilly (1844–1890), Irish poet, journalist, author and activist
- John G. Palfrey (1796–1881), American clergyman and historian
- John Palfrey (born 1972), American educator, scholar, and law professor
- John Thomas Parry (1853–1913), Welsh artist
- John Pasquin (born 1944), American director of film, television and theatre
- John Otunba Payne (1839–1906), Nigerian sheriff
- John Pitcairn Jr. (1841–1916), Scottish-born American industrialist
- John Gordon Purvis (born 1942), American man who spent nine years in prison for a murder he did not commit
- John Rando, American stage director
- John Neil Reagan (1908–1996), American radio station manager, elder brother of Ronald Reagan
- John Rich (director) (1925–2012), American film and television director
- John Ridge (c. 1802–1839), member of the Cherokee Nation
- John Robins (comedian) (born 1982), British comedian
- John Rogan (c. 1867–1905), American who was the second-tallest person ever
- John Rosengrant, American make-up and special effects artist
- John Singer Sargent, American artist
- John Schubeck (1936–1997), American television reporter and anchor
- John Smith (American wrestler) (born 1965), American wrestler
- John Smith (dentist) (1825–1910), Scottish dentist
- John Snorri Sigurjónsson (1973–2021), Icelandic high-altitude mountaineer
- John Solecki, American head of United Nations High Commissioner for Refugees
- John Sterling (1938–2026), American sports announcer
- John Howell Stubbs, American architectural preservationist and professor
- John Sturges (1910–1992), American film director
- John Payne Todd (1792–1852), first son of Dolley Madison, adopted son of James Madison
- John V. Tolan (born 1959), American historian
- John Traill (1835–1897), Scottish coffee house owner
- John Anderson Truman (1851–1914), father of Harry S. Truman
- John Varvatos (born 1954), American menswear designer
- John Varey (1922–1999), British Hispanist
- John M. Wallace (1815–1880), granduncle of Bess Truman
- John Warhurst (sound editor), American sound editor
- John F. Warren (1909–2000), American cinematographer
- John Weddell (1583–1642), English sea captain of the East India Company
- John Weldon (animator) (born 1945), Canadian actor, composer, animator and movie director
- John Wesley (artist) (1928–2022), American modern painter
- John B. Wood (1827–1884), American journalist
- John H. Wood Jr. (1916–1979), American federal judge
- John Wood (millowner) (1758–1???), created the Howard Town Mills complex in Glossop, England
- John Wood (Bradford manufacturer) (1793–1871), English industrialist and factory reformer
- John Wood (explorer) (1812–1871), Scottish explorer of central Asia
- John Wood (photographer), Civil War photographer for Union Army
- John C. Young (pastor) (1803–1857), Centre College president

== Pseudonyms ==
- Bible John, unidentified serial killer
- Chicken John (born 1967 or 1968), musician, showman, activist, and author
- Jihadi John (1988–2015), nickname for Kuwaiti-born British militant Mohammed Emwazi
- John 5 (guitarist), American guitarist
- John Doe, placeholder name for an anonymous person
- John Zegrus, unidentified criminal

== Fictional characters ==
- John-117, also known as Master Chief, the protagonist of the Halo franchise
- John, a character in the Doctor Who comic strip
- John Aman (Amazing-Man), a Golden Age superhero
- John Barton, a character in the British soap opera Emmerdale
- John Bates, a character from Downton Abbey, married to Anna
- John Clark, a character in Tom Clancy's Ryanverse
- John Connor, a character in the Terminator franchise
- John Constantine, a fictional character appearing in DC Comics franchise, including Hellblazer
- John Diggle (Arrowverse), from the Arrowerse franchise
- John Dillermand, the titular protagonist of John Dillermand
- John (Thunderbolt) Doherty, fictional character in the 1974 film Thunderbolt and Lightfoot
- John Dough, a gingerbread man brought to life in the Frank Baum book John Dough and the Cherub
- John Michael Dorian, the main character and protagonist of the TV series Scrubs
- John Drake (Danger Man), in the TV series Danger Man
- John Egbert, a character in the webcomic Homestuck
- John Falsworth (Baron Blood), a Marvel Comics vampire supervillain
- John Worthington Foulfellow, a main character in the 1940 film Pinocchio
- John Ross Ewing III, character from the TV series Dallas
- John Gillman, also known as the Homelander, a character from The Boys
- Greycrow, a Marvel Comics mutant character
- John Herbert, a character in the animated television series Family Guy
- John Jonah Jameson, a newspaper publisher in Marvel Comics
- John Kramer, also known as Jigsaw, a character in the Saw franchise
- John Locke, a character in the TV series Lost
- John Marston, a central character in the Red Dead franchise
- John "Soap" MacTavish, a character in the Call of Duty franchise
- John McBain, a character in the American daytime dramas One Life to Live and General Hospital
- John McClane, the main protagonist of the Die Hard franchise
- John Paul McQueen, a character from the British soap opera Hollyoaks
- John Proudstar (Thunderbird), a Marvel Comics mutant character
- John Rafferty, a character from the video game Anno 2205, voiced by Ben Whitehead
- John Rambo, the titular protagonist in the Rambo franchise
- John Redcorn, a character in the Fox animated series King of the Hill
- Major / Lieutenant Colonel John Sheppard, a main character in the American science fiction television series Stargate Atlantis
- Long John Silver, antagonist of the Robert Louis Stevenson novel Treasure Island
- John "Hannibal" Smith, a character in the 1980s action-adventure television series The A-Team
- John Stewart, a character in DC Comics, one of several characters known as Green Lantern
- John 'Sully' Sullivan, from the television series Third Watch
- John Beresford Tipton, the title benefactor of The Millionaire (TV series), a 1955–1960 American television series
- John H. Watson, associate of Sherlock Holmes
- John Wick, the titular protagonist of the John Wick franchise
- John Witter, a character from Dawson's Creek
- John Wraith, a Marvel Comics mutant character

== See also ==
- John Hathaway (disambiguation)
- John (surname)
