= John McMullin =

John McMullin may refer to:

- John McMullin (baseball)
- John McMullin (golfer)
- John McMullin (silversmith)

== See also ==
- John McMullen (disambiguation)
- John McMullan, American football player
- John McMullan (cricketer)
