= John Judson Ames =

American businessman and publisher

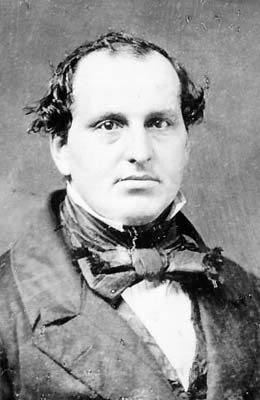
- Born: May 18, 1821; Maine, U.S.
- Died: July 28, 1861 (aged 40); San Diego, California, U.S.
- Occupation: California Pioneer

John Judson Ames (May 18, 1821 – July 28, 1861; pen name, "Boston") was a California Pioneer and the editor and proprietor of the first newspaper published in the city of San Diego, California.

== Early years ==
Ames was a native of Maine and his family was from Marshfield, Massachusetts. The family home was at Calais, Maine, but he was born at Islesboro on May 18, 1821. His father was John Gilkey Ames, a ship builder and coast trader, and his mother, Abigail Dodge. Judson appears to have left home at an early age to make his own way. His account of this reads as follows: "On the day on which we completed our sixteenth year, a wise father turned us out into the world with the parting words: 'Jud, you are now old enough to take care of yourself, and I think there is enough of the Yankee in you to insure your success. If you make a good beginning, I will render you any assistance you may require,—if not, you must try again. Be industrious— practice economy—shun wine and women—and I'll insure you for ten per cent, on your original cost.'" Little is known about Ames's early life, but he appears to have alternated some schooling with a number of sea voyages and several scrapes, until about his 25th year. He had a younger brother, Hudson N. Ames.

== Career ==
About the year 1847, he entered the employ of Henry O'Reilly, the builder of pioneer telegraph lines, and aided in the construction of the first through line from Memphis southward to New Orleans. Soon after his arrival in Louisiana, he turned his attention to newspaper work and established, at Baton Rouge, the new capital of that State, a paper which he called The Dime Catcher, and devoted his energies to the support of General Zachary Taylor's candidacy in the presidential campaign of 1848.

The excitement caused by the 1848 gold find in California reached Louisiana. Ames soon caught the gold fever, closed his office, and went to California via the Isthmus of Panama. He landed in San Francisco on October 28, 1849, without any money. Borrowing a handcart, he began hauling trunks and luggage, and always kept as a souvenir the first piece of money he earned at this employment. He was soon able to advance to the occupation of newspaper writer, and was for a time connected, in an editorial role, with the Placer Times and Transcript. He also wrote for other newspapers under his favorite pen-name of "Boston". In 1850, he made a trip to Honolulu, and it was probably immediately upon his return that he learned of the need to establish a newspaper in San Diego's New Town. He paid a visit to San Diego and issued a prospectus in December, 1850. There were similar interests in Los Angeles for the establishment of a newspaper. The first issue of La Estrella de Los Angeles appeared May 17, 1851, and thus it became the pioneer newspaper of the Southwest; Ames's San Diego Herald came out on May 29, just twelve days later.

Ames had at first the backing of several politicians who had in view the ultimate division of the State and the construction of the first transcontinental railway with San Diego as its terminus. Among these men were Senator William M. Gwin and Governor John B. Weller. There is no question that Ames worked and hoped for the success of Gwin for some time, but in 1854, he turned against him and declared that Gwin had acted with bad faith toward him individually.

Having issued his prospectus and worked up an excellent advertising patronage at both San Francisco and San Diego, Ames set about getting his office established. The paper consisted, at first, of four small pages with four columns to a page. It was published each Thursday, at US$10 per annum, "half in advance". In January, 1852, the publication day was changed permanently to Saturday. There was some local news, domestic and foreign advise brought by steamer, and a hastily written editorial. He looked after this patronage carefully and made frequent trips to the north in its interest. The paper was twice enlarged, the first time in the spring of 1853 and the second on May 13, 1854. At the time of the first enlargement, the subscription price was reduced to $5 per annum, "always in advance," or $3 for six months. The 1854 enlargement made it a seven-column sheet, and Ames then claimed that the Herald had the largest general circulation of any paper in California.

The editorial policy first announced by Ames was, that the paper would be "Independent, but not Neutral," and this course was adhered to for a time. Ames took no active part in the campaign of 1851, but two years later he cast in his lot with the Democrats and supported John Bigler for Governor. In 1856, he went over to the American, or "Know Nothing" party, but later returned to the Democratic party. He was always somewhat independent of politics, and particularly disliked and opposed President Franklin Pierce, probably because of his veto of an appropriation for the improvement of the San Diego River.

The difficulties attending the publication of a newspaper in such a far frontier town as San Diego were soon evident. The dearth of local news and failures to receive exchanges was the cause of frequent editorial grumbling. At one period, Ames ran for several weeks a list of all the post offices and postmaster in California, and at another filled up with a circular of the General Land Office. Most of the American population, including Ames himself, hoped for the ultimate annexation of Lower California, but the presence of the military post and the influence of the army officers, with most of whom Ames was always on intimate terms, made open support or sympathy inexpedient. The Herald achieved its greatest journalistic feat by publishing a series of letters from one of Walker's officers, all grossly colored to favor the filibusters; but toward the last, when the hopelessness of the expedition was clear to all, Ames denounced it.

Ames was known for his frequent and prolonged absences from San Diego, when he would go to San Francisco to look after his advertising patronage, collect bills, and have a good time. On August 27, 1852, he announced his departure for the East and that the office would be closed and the paper suspended in the meantime. Where Ames spent this vacation is not known, but by the next steamer after his departure, a smooth-speaking stranger arrived and sought out Judge James W. Robinson, who was Ames' attorney and had been left in charge of his business affairs. The stranger introduced himself as William N. Walton and said he had come to take charge of the Herald and continue its publication. He told a plausible story to the effect that he was an old friend of Ames', that they had met at the wharf in San Francisco when the steamer for Panama was on the point of sailing, and concluded an agreement. There had been no time to put this in writing; but Walton seemed to know Ames and the Herald so well, and was altogether so glib and plausible, that Robinson was convinced and allowed him to take possession of the office.

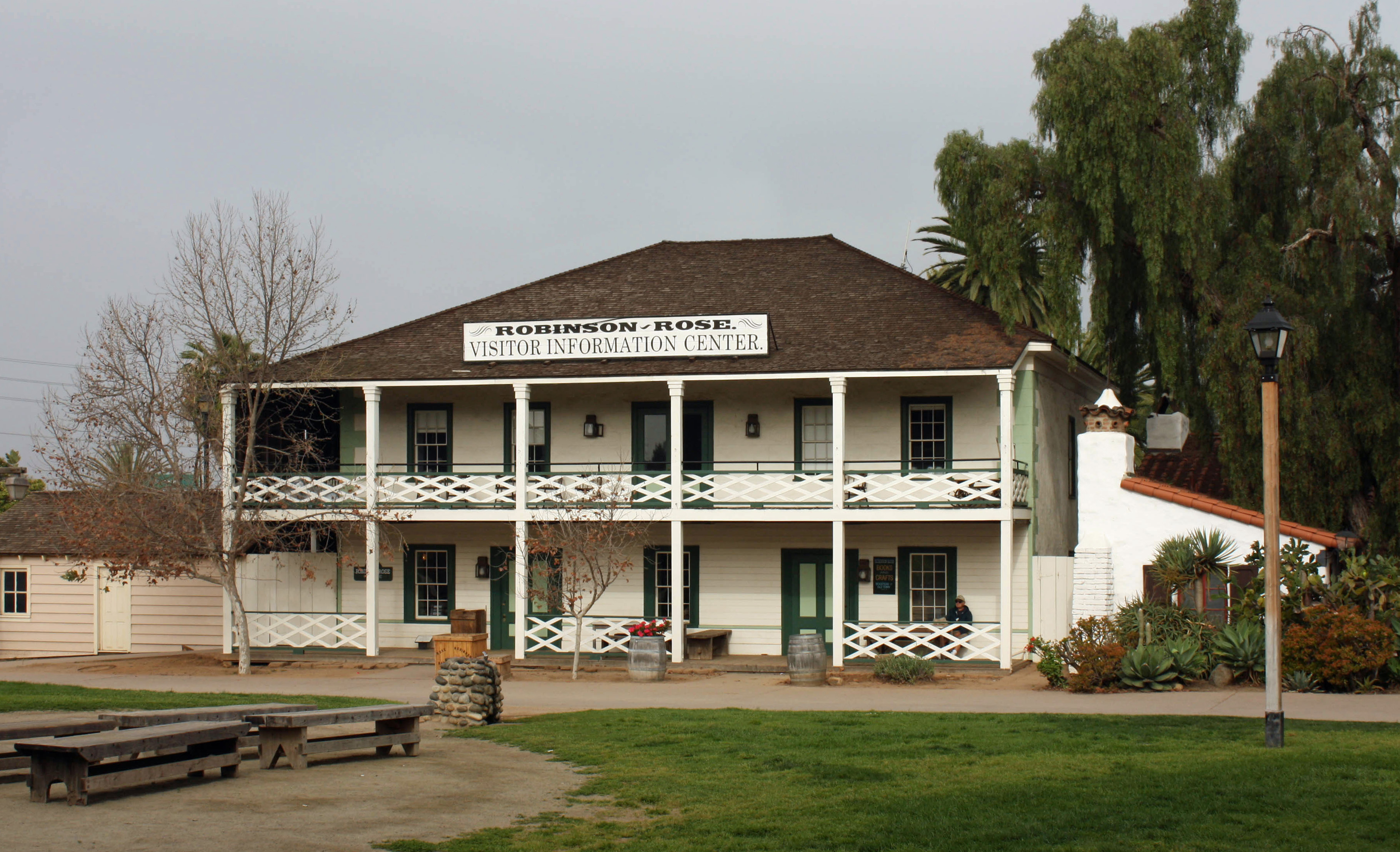
Built in 1850, the Robinson-Rose House contained the offices of the Herald when they were moved to Old Town, San Diego.

Ames returned in March, 1853, and Walton quickly departed. In July, 1853, he was appointed and served for a time on the staff of David B. Kurtz, major-general of state militia, as an aide with the rank of captain. The Herald removed to Old Town, San Diego, at this time, and with it, the first enlargement was made to the paper's size. For the next seven years, the Herald was published on the second floor of a building at the northwest corner of the Old Town plaza, and during this time, it reflected more accurately than before the conditions of the Spanish-American life of the community. In the fall of 1853, Ames left his paper for a time to Lieutenant George Derby. Later, Ames compiled and edited Phœnixiana; or Sketches and burlesques, by John Phœnix (Derby's pseudonym).

On April 21, 1855, Ames announced he was leaving for the East Coast. He had printed an average edition of 500 copies, and the paper had made him a comfortable living. It is probable, however, Ames was able to travel so much because of some other source—perhaps from his father's estate. It is also highly probable that Ames thought he was leaving San Diego for good. He had tried, without success, to sell the paper. During his frequent absences he wrote long letters to the Herald, which he signed "Boston," a pseudonym by which he was rather proud to be known. He attempted the humorous and wrote a series of burlesque accounts of his adventures while traveling, in 1855–56. He was an admirer of Lord Byron and himself wrote sentimental verses of passable quality. During the whole of his residence in San Diego he was a notary public, part of the time the only one, and this made a small addition to his income and helped bind up his interests with those of Bigler and Gwin. He was elected and served one term as councilman, one as justice of the peace and ex officio member of the court of sessions. He was also county superintendent of schools and served for a time as flour inspector for San Diego County.

Ames continued to publish the San Diego Herald until April 1860. He then moved to San Bernardino and began to publish the San Bernardino Herald; it was the first newspaper in San Bernardino County.

== Personal life ==
Ames was a Mason; he helped organize the first lodge in San Diego (which was also the first in Southern California), and was for a time its Master.

He was married three times. His first wife, Emily Balch, was of Lubeck, Maine. They had two children: a daughter, Helen, who died at about the age of 18; and a son, George Gordon (after Lord Byron), who died in infancy. This marriage was unhappy and ended in divorce. His second wife, Eliza (died San Diego, March 14, 1857), was from Carroll, Maryland. His third wife survived him and was remarried, after his death, to C. A. Houston, of San Bernardino. By her, Ames had one son, Hudson ("Huddie"; San Diego, November 19, 1859 - San Bernardino, March 27, 1863). He died in 1861.
