= John Streltzer =

American politician

John E. Streltzer

Member of the Colorado House of Representatives
- In office 1957–1961

Member of the Colorado House of Representatives

Personal details
- Born: June 2, 1901 Denver, Colorado, U.S.
- Died: December 15, 1985 Denver, Colorado, U.S.
- Party: Democratic
- Spouse: Sarah
- Children: Jon, Roberta, Toby

John E. Streltzer (June 2, 1901 - December 16, 1985) was a legislator in the U.S. state of Colorado, philanthropist, and former U.S. Director of Customs for Colorado and Wyoming.

John was married to Sarah Streltzer, and established a wholesale office supply business in the Denver, Colorado area.

John served nearly three terms as a member of the Colorado House of Representatives in the 1950s. During his third term, President John Kennedy appointed John the Director of Customs for Colorado and Wyoming, a position he held until 1969. John then became Vice President of Public Relations at Metropolitan State Bank (Denver, Colorado), later renamed Metro National Bank and Cherry Creek National Bank, before being consolidated into WestStar Bank and then finally U.S. Bancorp.

John also served as the President of the Ex-Patients Sanatorium (also known as the Ex-Patients Tubercular Home) in Denver, as well as the National Mental Health Center, a Jewish-sponsored mental health hospital which utilized the facilities of the Ex-Patients Sanatorium to provide free treatment and rehabilitation for needy patients with tuberculosis and other chronic diseases and to provide free psychiatric treatment to mentally ill patients. The National Mental Health Center and Ex-Patients Sanatorium were predecessor institutions to the modern, non-sectarian National Jewish Health, an academic medical research facility located in Denver specializing in respiratory, cardiac, immune and allergic disorders.

Throughout his life John was involved in many Jewish, general, and medical causes, including Ex-Patient's Tubercular Home, Israel Bonds, B'nai B'rith, Kiwanis, March of Dimes, AMC Cancer Research Center (JCRS), Red Cross, United Way, and Allied Jewish Welfare Fund.
