= John Arter =

British singer-songwriter

John Arter is a British singer-songwriter, best known as the lead singer of John Arter & the Eastern Kings, a London-based band that blends country, rock, neo-folk, and Americana.

== Career ==
With The Eastern Kings, an international collective of multi-instrumentalists, Arter has experimented with merging country, rock and neo-folk elements. As of 2025, the band has released debut album Not Just A Story. The album title Not Just a Story is taken from a line in “Mariner’s Song”, a track Arter wrote around twenty years earlier and the only song on the record to originate from his pre-Eastern Kings era. With The Eastern Kings, Arter typically introduces new songs via rough home demos which the band then road-test live before recording. “The Fall”, later released as the final single preceding Not Just a Story, was first performed at a headline show at the World’s End in Camden, where it was singled out by audience members. The track reached #13 on the UK & Ireland Groover Charts.

Arter has characterised John Arter & the Eastern Kings as “first and foremost a live band”, known for high-energy shows in venues ranging from pub stages to larger theatres. He and the group emphasise direct connection with audiences and a playful on-stage dynamic. Songs such as “The Fall” and “Empty Rooms” are arranged to move between room-filling volume and near-silence, producing what band members describe as “pin-drop” moments in performance.

== Discography ==
- Dark Country EP - as John Arter (May 2024)
- Not Just A Story - as John Arter & The Eastern Kings (Released, September 2025).

== Critical reception ==
With The Eastern Kings, Arter has received widespread critical acclaim across UK Americana and independent music media for his emotionally resonant songwriting, cinematic arrangements and genre-blending approach. Critics consistently note the band's cinematic scope and attention to emotional detail.
