= John Willard Banks =

American artist

John Willard Banks (November 7, 1912 – April 14, 1988) was a self-taught African American artist known for his vivid and expressive drawings that document Black life and imagination in 20th-century Texas.

== Life ==
Born near Seguin, Texas, Banks moved to San Antonio as a child and later returned to Seguin after his parents' divorce. He left formal education after the tenth grade and worked in various labor jobs, including in oilfields, as a truck driver, and as a custodian. He served as a sergeant in the U.S. Army during World War II, stationed in the Philippines.

Banks began drawing as a child and pursued art more seriously later in life, starting his art career in 1978 while recovering from illness. His wife Earlie Smith Banks played a key role in introducing his work to the public. His drawings caught the attention of San Antonio art patrons Joseph and Aaronetta Pierce, who helped guide his artistic career.

Banks's first solo exhibition took place in 1984 at the Caroline Lee Gallery in San Antonio when he was 72 years old. His work was later included in numerous exhibitions, including Handmade and Heartfelt, Rambling on My Mind: Black Folk Art of the Southwest, and Black History/Black Vision: The Visionary Image in Texas. His art was characterized by pencil and pen outlines filled with colored pencil, crayon, or marker, depicting both real and imagined scenes—from rural Texas life and religious events to African village life and social commentary on slavery and urban poverty.

John Willard Banks died in San Antonio in 1988, leaving behind several hundred works that remain as significant contributions to African American folk art and Southern cultural history.

== Quotes ==
"My visions are like a veil crossing my eyes in the night. I have to draw them right away or they’ll be gone." - John Banks
