= John Valera =

American politician

Member of New Hampshire House of Representatives for Hillsborough 38
- In office 2016 – December 4, 2018

Personal details
- Party: Republican

John J. Valera is an American politician. He was a member of the New Hampshire House of Representatives and represented Hillsborough 38th district.
