= John Sherwen =

English physician and archaeologist

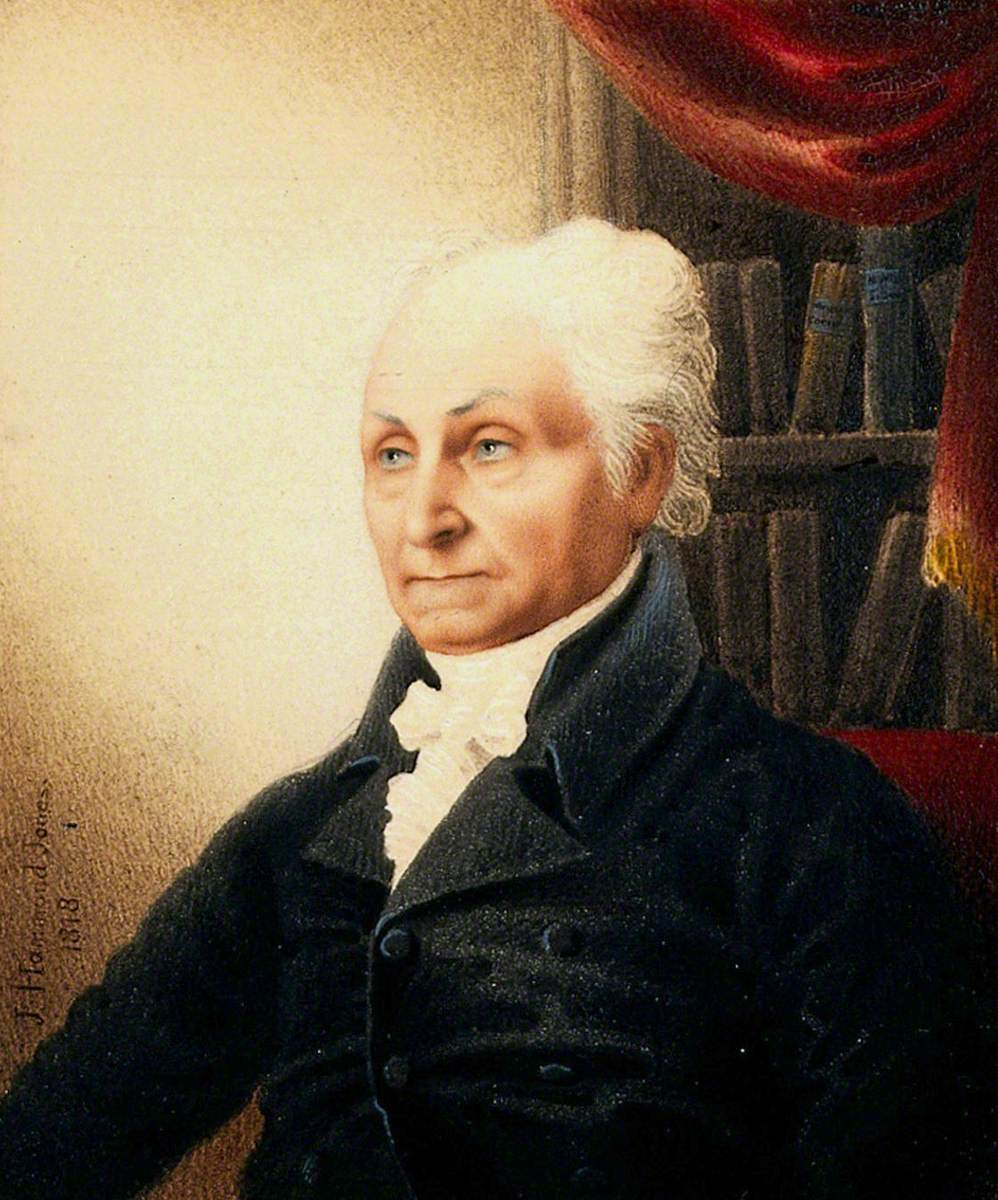
- Born: 1749; Cumberland
- Died: 2 September 1826 (aged 76–77)
- Occupations: Physician and archaeologist

John Sherwen (1749 – 2 September 1826) was an English physician and archaeologist.

== Biography ==
Sherwen is said to have been born in Cumberland in 1749, and to have been related to the family of Curwen. He was a pupil at St Thomas' Hospital, London, and passed as a surgeon. In 1769 he was at Acheen in Sumatra, the voyage thither from Falmouth having taken five months, and he was afterwards at Calcutta and in the Bay of Bengal. At this time he was in the service of the East India Company. In 1771 he returned to England and practised as a surgeon at Enfield in Middlesex, where he was friendly with Richard Gough, and frequently contributed to the medical journals. The titles of several of his papers are inserted in Robert Watt's ‘Bibliotheca Britannica,’ and a silver medal for his contributions was given him by the Medical Society in March 1788.

Sherwen was admitted M.D. of Aberdeen University on 14 February 1798 (Anderson, Aberdeen Graduates, 1893, p. 143), and on 4 May 1802 he became an extra-licentiate of the College of Physicians in London. In 1802 he paid a visit to Paris. His first wife was Douglas, posthumous daughter of Duncan Campbell of Salt Spring, Jamaica. She visited Bath for her health, and died there on 16 June 1804, when a monument to her memory was erected in Bath Abbey. A year or two later Sherwen settled permanently in Bath, occupying 18 Great Stanhope Street, and obtaining some medical practice. He married, on 12 November 1807, Lydia Ann (1773–1851), daughter of the Rev. Mr. Dannett, of Liverpool. He had made a patient study of the early English writers, and his library contained some rare volumes of Elizabethan literature. From 1808 to 1813 he was a frequent contributor to the ‘Gentleman's Magazine,’ mainly on the authenticity of the ‘Rowley’ poems, of the genuineness of which he was a keen advocate. He assisted John Britton in his work on Bath Abbey (Preface, p. xii), and Britton dedicated to him the view of the abbey church from the south side (p. 60). Though he retained his house at Bath he made frequent trips to Enfield, and died there on 2 September 1826.

Sherwen published in 1809 his ‘Introduction to an Examination of some part of the Internal Evidence respecting the Antiquity and Authenticity of certain Publications,’ by Rowley or Chatterton. The copy at the British Museum was corrected by him for a further issue, but it did not reach a new edition; and the promised second part of his ‘Examination’ was never published. One fair copy of his full observations on this controversy is in the British Museum Additional MSS. 6388 and 6389; another is in the Bath Institution. Two quarto volumes of his annotations on Shakespeare are in that institution, and at the British Museum there are several books on the Chatterton controversy, with many manuscript notes by him.

Sherwen was also author of ‘Cursory Remarks on the Marine Scurvy’ (anon.), 1782, and ‘Observations on the Diseased and Contracted Urinary Bladder,’ 1799. The ‘Medical Spectator’ (vols. i. ii. and small part of iii. dated 1794) is attributed to him.

Additional publications, digitized by the National Library of Medicine, include:

- Dr. Sherwen, on Digitalis (1800)
- Observations on Bilious Disorders (1801)
- Observations on the Advantages of Artificially Scorbuticizing the System in Some Circumstances (1814).
