= John Goodgroome =

English musician

- Born: 1630? Windsor
- Died: 15 May 1704
- Occupation: Musician

John Goodgroome (1630? – 15 May 1704) was an English music composer, lutenist, singer, and teacher.

== Biography ==
Goodgroome was one of a family of musicians, born at Windsor, and bred up a chorister. He was present at the coronations of Charles II, James II, and William and Mary, as one of the gentlemen of the Chapel Royal. In 1666 Goodgroome succeeded Notario and Henry Purcell the elder as musician in ordinary for the lute and voice and lute and violl, at the fee of 40l., and 16l. 2s. 6d. yearly for livery, while his post in the chapel choir was worth from 70l. to 73l. According to Wood, Goodgroome was a ‘rare songster, and taught some persons to sing.’ Four airs by Goodgroome, with bass for theorbo lute, or bass violl, were published in J. Playford's ‘Select Airs,’ and subsequently in the ‘Treasury’ of March 1669, and three of these, arranged for two and three voices, in the ‘Musical Companion,’ 1673; other music is in the Lambeth Palace Library, and two manuscript songs in the Fitzwilliam collection. Pepys records the visits of Theodore Goodgroome as his or his wife's singing-master from 1 July 1661 occasionally until 31 Aug. 1667. A John Goodgroome, organist of St. Peter's, Cornhill, 1725, may have been the son of John or Theodore Goodgroome, or of William Goodgroome, who is in the register of St. Dionys Backchurch, 1701, as music-master. The date of John Goodgroome's death is given in the Old Cheque-book, 15 May 1704.
