= John McMullan (cricketer) =

New Zealand cricketer

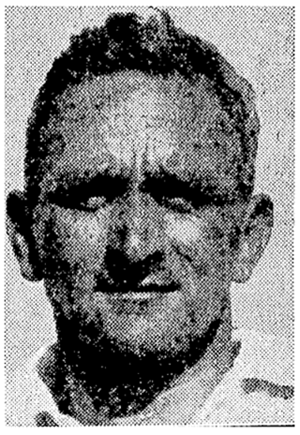
- McMullan pictured in 1938

Personal information
- Full name: John James Morrell McMullan
- Born: 23 April 1893; Dunedin, Otago, New Zealand
- Died: 28 April 1967 (aged 74); Dunedin, Otago, New Zealand
- Batting: Left-handed
- Role: Occasional wicket-keeper

Domestic team information
- Years: Team
- 1917/18–1929/30: Otago

Career statistics
Competition	First-class
Matches	32
Runs scored	1,718
Batting average	30.14
100s/50s	3/9
Top score	157*
Balls bowled	16
Wickets	0
Bowling average	–
5 wickets in innings	–
10 wickets in match	–
Best bowling	–
Catches/stumpings	14/3
- Source: ESPNCricinfo, 1 April 2017

John James Morrell McMullan (23 April 1893 – 28 April 1967) was a New Zealand cricketer and teacher. He played 32 first-class matches for Otago between the 1917–18 and 1929–30 seasons and later became a selector for the New Zealand national cricket team.

== Life and career ==
McMullan was born at Dunedin in 1893. A left-handed batsman and occasional wicket-keeper, he made his first-class debut against Southland in 1917–18. Batting at number four, he made 157 not out, part of a team total of 313 runs. Otago won by an innings. In his next first-class match, against Wellington two seasons later, he made 85 not out and 25 runs in his two innings. He thus scored 267 runs in his first-class career before being dismissed, setting a world first-class record which was not broken until 1946, when Sam Loxton scored 305 runs before being dismissed.

The rest of his career was steady, and included two more centuries, both in the Plunket Shield: 111 against Wellington in 1923–24 (one of seven centuries in the match) and 131 (after 51 in the first innings) against Auckland in 1927–28. In 1923 the Otago Daily Times described him thus: "Left-hand bat of the 'rock' order. Has to be dug out; also a fine field." In the 1930s he served on the selection panel for the Otago team; during the Second World War he was the sole selector. He also coached young players in Dunedin and was a selector for the New Zealand national side.

McMullan was awarded a BA in History by New Zealand University in 1920. He was headmaster of the Tainui School in Dunedin until 1945, when he became headmaster of George Street School, also in Dunedin. He died at Dunedin in 1967 at the age of 74. An obituary was published in the New Zealand Cricket Almanack later in the year.
