= John F. Bergstrom =

American entrepreneur

- Born: Neenah, Wisconsin, United States
- Education: Marquette University, Medical College of Wisconsin, Lawrence University
- Occupation: Entrepreneur
- Organization: Bergstrom Automotive
- Title: Executive Chairman

John F. Bergstrom is an American entrepreneur, automotive dealer, and philanthropist. He is the co-founder and Executive Chairman of Bergstrom Automotive, a major car dealership group based in Neenah, Wisconsin.

== Early life and education ==
John Bergstrom's entrepreneurship journey began after graduating from Marquette University. Along with his brother Dick Bergstrom, he transformed a former post office site in Neenah into a small bar called The Old Post Office. He later decided to pursue the retail automotive business.

== Career ==
In 1974, John co-founded Bergstrom Automotive in Neenah. The group expanded its operations through acquisitions and opened its first new car store, a Chevrolet outlet, in 1982. In 2020, Bergstrom Automotive acquired Cliff Wall Automotive's Subaru, Mazda, and Mitsubishi dealerships in Green Bay. As of 2026, it operates nearly 40 dealership locations across Wisconsin representing 32 brands. The company also has 10 body shops.

== Philanthropy ==
Bergstrom has served on the boards of Associated Bank, Kimberly-Clark Corporation, WEC Energy Group, the Green Bay Packers, and the Fox Cities Performing Arts Center.

He was a member of the Marquette University Board of Trustees in the late 1990s, where he supported the School of Dentistry's initiative to construct a new facility and revise its curriculum. His involvement included advocating for state funding and operational changes to improve the school's financial stability. He received several awards from Marquette University, including the Distinguished Alumnus of the Year Award in 1988 and the All-University Alumnus of the Year Award in 2003.

Bergstrom participated in philanthropic efforts in the Fox Valley. He contributed to projects such as the Fox Cities Performing Arts Center and an outdoor skating rink in downtown Neenah. He was involved in fundraising for organizations like the Menasha Boys & Girls Club and Bubolz Nature Preserve. He led a project to create an ice rink in downtown Neenah, which was modeled after Rockefeller Center's rink.

His company supported the establishment of a new Boys & Girls Club in the Fox Cities area, which resulted in him receiving the Janet Berry Volunteer of the Year Award in 2015. He purchased an elementary school property from the Neenah Joint School District and donated it to ThedaCare Regional Medical Center-Neenah.

In September 2020, Bergstrom raised funds for children with critical illnesses. On October 16, 2023, he donated 3½ acres of land for the Neenah Animal Shelter project and contributed to its capital campaign.

== Awards and recognition ==
- 2003: TIME Magazine's Dealer of the Year .
- 2015: Janet Berry Volunteer of the Year award.
- 2019: Glassdoor Employees' Choice Award.
- 2019: Top 100 Board Members of Fortune 500 Companies (National Association of Corporate Directors).
- 2023: Honorary doctorate from Lawrence University.
- 2023: Inducted into the Wisconsin Business Hall of Fame.
- 2023: Recognized as one of four award winners by Junior Achievement of Wisconsin at their 33rd Annual Event.
