= John Tomaszewski =

American pathologist

John E. Tomaszewski is an American pathologist, a significant figure focusing in renal pathology, immunopathology and urological pathology, currently a distinguished professor at the University at Buffalo.
