= John Peter Malveaux =

American serial killer

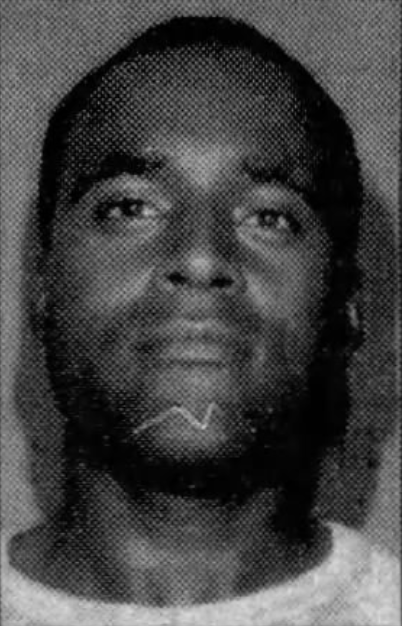
- Born: 1964 (age 61–62); Opelousas, Louisiana, U.S.
- Convictions: First-degree murder (4 counts); Rape
- Penalty: Life imprisonment without parole

Details
- Victims: 4
- Span of crimes: February 20, 1996 – October 29, 1997
- Country: United States
- State: Louisiana
- Date apprehended: November 4, 1997
- Imprisoned at: Louisiana State Penitentiary, West Feliciana Parish, Louisiana

John Peter Malveaux (born 1964) is an American serial killer and rapist who committed four murders around Opelousas, Louisiana, from February 1996 to October 1997. Following his arrest and confession to the crimes, Malveaux pleaded guilty on all counts and was given four life terms without parole.

== Early life ==
Malveaux was born in 1964 in Opelousas, Louisiana. He was an altar boy as a child and later moved to a trailer park in Lafayette, where he married a woman and had six boys. According to neighbors and acquaintances, Malveaux was considered a friendly and respected man who was beloved by most people in his social circle, but was also known to have drinking problems and a strained relationship with the local Apostolic Church.

== Murders ==
Malveaux's first suspected victim was Melissa Thomas, whom he allegedly strangled at the Little Zion Cemetery in the northern parts of Opelousas on January 31, 1996. Years later, Samuel Little confessed to her murder. On February 20, he sexually assaulted and strangled 38-year-old Diane Sam after she refused to have sex with him, and then dumped her partially unclothed body at an apartment complex in Opelousas, where it was found later that same day. At first, her death was erroneously attributed to natural causes, and was not linked to the murders until after Malveaux's arrest.

In July 1997, Malveaux raped and strangled two additional victims: 26-year-old Carolyn Breaux Nichols, a resident of Opelousas, and Tamika Blake Wilson, who was visiting from Baltimore, Maryland. Both women's bodies were later found abandoned near the St. Landry Parish Airport by a passer-by. On October 19, he met a woman at a nightclub in Opelousas and took her to a storage shed behind Lincoln Street, where he proceeded to rape and attempt to strangle her. Due to the overwhelming force she was being strangled with, the victim's eyes started bleeding and she lost consciousness, leading her attacker to believe that she was dead. Unbeknownst to Malveaux, she came to her senses a few hours later and ran to the nearest house to search for help, informing authorities that she had just been assaulted.

On October 29, Malveaux met 38-year-old Tammy Duplechin Smith at the Charcoal Lounge in Opelousas. He then drove to a rural spot in nearby Evangeline Parish, where he proceeded to rape and strangle her before leaving her body there, deciding to keep her Dodge Dynasty for himself.

== Arrest and investigation ==
Following Smith's disappearance, investigators started searching for any clues that help them find her, which included locating her car. On November 4, officers in Breaux Bridge found the car with Malveaux sleeping inside it, resulting in his immediate arrest. During subsequent interrogations, he was identified as a suspect in the murders of Thomas, Nichols, Wilson, and Smith, as well as the rape and assault on the surviving victim. The arrest came as a shock to his family and neighbors, most of whom claimed that while they knew he had problems, they had never thought he would be capable of murder.

Two days after his arrest, Malveaux confessed to killing Sam, revealing details about her death that only the killer could know. Due to this, authorities considered exhuming Sam's body in a bid to gather potential additional evidence against Malveaux. In the meantime, he was jailed at the Evangeline Parish Jail to await second-degree murder charges, with bond set at $1 million. Investigators from both parishes started coordinating with one another to make clear how the murders were carried out and what to do in future court proceedings. As a result of this, another woman came forward and accused Malveaux of raping her in 1995, but no charges were brought forward in this case.

== Trials and imprisonment ==
Later that month, Malveaux stood trial before a grand jury in St. Landry Parish, where he admitted responsibility for the murders committed there and recounted in detail what had transpired. In the end, he pleaded guilty on all counts and was thus sentenced to three life terms without the possibility of parole. Approximately a week after the trial's conclusion, a special task force was formed to investigate other potential crimes committed by Malveaux, but no further crimes were linked to him.

In mid-December, Malveaux was brought to trial in Evangeline Parish to face murder charges in the Smith case. During the proceedings, he recanted claims he had made during his police interrogation and claimed that he had actually killed her in St. Landry Parish, which prompted further investigations to verify his claims. Five days later, coroner Roderick Perron released a report that indicated that Smith had died in Evangeline Parish as originally indicated by Malveaux, allowing proceedings to continue as normal. Around this time, several articles came out that proclaimed that Malveaux was the first recorded serial killer in St. Landry Parish's history.

Under Louisiana law, the theft of Smith's car was registered as possible robbery, which meant that Malveaux was eligible for the death penalty if convicted. After talking with the victim's family members, prosecutor Earl Taylor was convinced to accept a plea bargain that would spare Malveaux the death sentence and net him a fourth life term without parole if he pleaded guilty. After sentencing, Malveaux expressed apparent remorse for his actions and claimed that he knew God wanted him to plead guilty, but also said that he was not a killer and was unable to explain why he had started killing in the first place.

As of March 2025, Malveaux remains incarcerated at the Louisiana State Penitentiary in West Feliciana Parish.

== See also ==
- List of serial killers in the United States
