= John Gmeiner =

John Gmeiner (5 December 1847, Bärnau, Bavaria - 17 February 1915, Richfield, Minnesota) was an American Roman Catholic clergyman.

== Biography ==
He studied at St. Francis Seminary, Milwaukee, Wisconsin, was ordained priest in 1870, was professor in the seminary, and later in St. Thomas Seminary, Saint Paul, Minnesota. In 1899 he became rector of St. Francis' Church, Buffalo, Minnesota, and from 1902 until his death was rector of St. Raphael's Church, Springfield, Minnesota. In 1893 he addressed the World's Parliament of Religions at Chicago on "The Primitive and Prospective Religious Unity of Mankind".

Gmeiner was advocate of theistic evolution.

== Works ==
His publications include:

- Modern Scientific Views and Christian Doctrines Compared (1884)
- Are German Catholics Unfairly Treated? (1887)
- Emmanuel: the Saviour of the World (1888)
- Mediæval and Modern Cosmology (1891)
