= John Caulker =

Sierra Leonean activist (born 1970)

- Born: 28 November 1970 (age 55); Sierra Leone
- Occupations: Executive Director and Founder of Fambul Tok International
- Known for: Activism

John Caulker (28 November 1970) is a Sierra Leonean political and social activist. He has founded several important nongovernmental organizations.

== Early life ==
Caulker was born in Freetown, Sierra Leone. Before the Sierra Leonean Civil War (1991–2002) started, Caulker lived with his mother there. Caulker and his family fled from Songo in 1995 because the Revolutionary United Front (RUF) had reached Songo. Caulker became an activist in the early 1990s, around the same time as the war started.

He was a MSC Criminal Justice Student at University of Leicester UK in 2005 and 2006.

== Early career ==
In the mid 1990s, Caulker founded the Forum of Conscience. He would dress in jeans and long T-shirts and enter rebel camps to interview the fighters and record their wartime stories. Afterwards, risking his life, John would provide information to Amnesty International to ensure that peoples outside of Sierra Leone could differentiate gossip from facts.

Caulker was then a senior fellow at Catalyst for Peace from its inception in 2003 by Elisabeth Hoffman. It was created to help everyday citizens impact their communities. This organization helped him realize his mission to help communities in Sierra Leone affected by the civil war by setting up his own NGO.

== Fambul Tok ==
In 2007, he founded a nongovernmental organization in Freetown, Sierra Leone, to promote peace in post-civil war Sierra Leone through storytelling. It is called Fambul Tok (Krio for "Family Talk") and he is its executive director.

A documentary was made in 2011 about the organization.

=== Origins ===
A United Nations-special backed court spent over US$300 million attempting to prosecute some of the war criminals in the Sierra Leonean Civil War. Caulker believed this to be a misuse of funds and decided to set up an organization that would do more to help the everyday person heal from the wounds of the war.

=== Aims ===
Many former soldiers, some of whom committed serious crimes against their neighbors and neighbors's families, still live in villages in Sierra Leone. Sometimes, former Civil war rebels live beside the very people whom they abused. Caulker believed that reviving the precolonial Sierra Leonean tradition of gathering and telling stories could enhance the sense of community in such villages and repair some of the broken relations.

=== Process ===
Fambul Tok centers the idea of solving problems through community building and restorative justice, as opposed to the Western ideals of crime and punishment. The program relies on a diverse array of support ranging from village chiefs to war victims. The organization's method is travelling across Sierra Leone to such villages. Caulker or a staff member begins the process by listening to the community and guiding them to find their own truths. They create an environment that promotes truthful storytelling and transparency and encourage 100% community participation. then they have the perpetrators and victims tell their stories. They then ask perpetrators to choose whether they will ask for forgiveness and victims to choose whether they will give forgiveness. The following day, they host a ceremony in which the participants sacrifice an animal (usually a goal or fowl). Finally, the community circles around a self-designated peace tree which acts as a permanent spot at which people resolve their disputes.

They worked in tandem with the Truth and Reconciliation Working Group (TRWG), a body of Sierra Leonean NGOs that aim to preserve factual storytelling, history in particular, and prevent alternative versions of facts from being publicized. This was to prevent Sierra Leoneans from interpreting history in a way that might encourage future conflicts.

=== Awards ===
In 2010, after submitting a trailer detailing the organization's mission, the film Fambul Tok won the first place prize at the My Hero Film Festival, which looks to promote awareness of local issues as a way to create positive change in the world.

=== Funding ===
Catalyst for Peace provides assistance, not only acting as an outside overseer to provide funding, but also committing staff members and expertise to contribute to Fambul Tok's mission. This partnership is an "emergent design" for development.

=== Ebola Outbreak Work ===
Fambul Tok also did work around the Ebola outbreak. In 2014, Fambul Tok International partnered with nine national NGOs and thirty local community based organizations to form the Bridging Communities Network (BCN), created by Caulker on 26 November 2014 in Port Loko District, Sierra Leone. Its aim was to create a countrywide, local response against the Ebola outbreak.

Caulker and the Fambul Tok staff attempted to educate locals about how to prevent the spread of Ebola. This required full community cooperation, from the staff to the chiefs to the people. The virus affected many families in Sierra Leone, in particular creating many orphans. Due to the belief that a village raises a child, Fambul Tok encouraged orphans to remain in their original communities should their parents pass away.

In advocating for more local involvement as opposed to international involvement in the fight against Ebola, Caulker asked the NGOs to facilitate community building and mobilize social capital to further educate people on how to mitigate the outbreak. Many participants in the network, specifically those who had relatives who had died from Ebola, were helped to have better access to pertinent health-related information. They were thus given cell phones which enabled them to contact high-ranking personnel in the Bridging Communities Network. At the end of 2014, formal consultations had been conducted in Moyamba, Koinadugu, and Kailahun districts.

=== Inter District Learning and Sharing Conference ===
The Inter District Learning and Sharing Conferences took place from 10 to 12 November 2016. The conference aimed to create a more community-centered approach to governance where the government would include popular opinions in policy making. The meetings took place in Moyamba, Kailahun, and Koinadugu districts. Building on the foundation he created through the Bridging Communities Network (BCN), Caulker worked with the community and policymakers on how to build sustainable, forward-looking policies to encourage local and national scale development.
