= John Chong (beekeeper) =

Singaporean beekeeper

- Occupations: Beekeeper; Teacher
- Known for: BEE Amazed Garden
- Children: 1
- Website: beeamazed

John Chong is a Singaporean beekeeper and teacher who founded BEE Amazed Garden, one of Singapore's only beekeeping centres. Chong uses BEE Amazed Garden to educate others about bees.

== Career ==
=== Teaching career (1979–2016) ===
Chong started teaching in 1979 at Yung An Primary School. He worked for numerous schools and was one of nine Singaporean teachers who started the Singapore International School in Hong Kong. He would also become the vice-principal of Zhangde and MacPherson Primary School.

In 2015, Chong took a trip to Myanmar and India and stated that "After my visit to the two countries, I saw the poverty there. And I thought, well, maybe it's time to give back to the society". Once he returned to Singapore, he retired from MOE in December 2016.

=== Beekeeping career (2017–present) ===
Chong developed an interest in bees after trying some honey from stingless bees. When he accompanied his son to Australia for his studies, he wrote to 10 local beekeepers on advice in beekeeping. Afterwards, Chong decided to concentrate his beekeeping efforts in Singapore.

In December 2017, Chong founded BEE Amazed Garden in Yishun. Chong uses his garden to relocate bees and educate others about bees. He also sells honey he imports from Israel instead of selling the honey his bees make.

In 2022, BEE Amazed left its premises at Yishun as it was under redevelopment. BEE Amazed is currently located on the rooftop of the Singapore University of Social Sciences (SUSS). Chong also educates students on bees.
