= John Glavin (academic) =

American academic

- Born: 1943 (age 82–83)
- Occupation: Professor of English

Academic background
- Education: Georgetown University (BA); Bryn Mawr College (PhD)

Academic work
- Discipline: Victorian literature
- Sub-discipline: Literary adaptation
- Institutions: Georgetown University

John Glavin (born 1943) is an American academic and Professor of English at Georgetown University. A Victorianist, he specialized in the works of Charles Dickens, and later in his career developed an academic interest in literary adaptations for film and television. As a result of his research interests, his courses include an emphasis on techniques in screenwriting. He has been a member of the Georgetown faculty since 1967, and also directed the Georgetown Office of Fellowships, Awards, and Research.

Glavin's approach to literature and teaching methodology has been cited as an influence by several students who have pursued careers as writers, mostly in the film industry.

== Education ==
Glavin has spent the vast majority of his life and academic career affiliated with Georgetown University in Washington, D.C. He graduated with a BA in English in 1964 before attending Bryn Mawr College in Bryn Mawr, Pennsylvania, where he completed an MA and PhD. In 1967, returned to his alma mater to join the faculty of the College of Arts & Sciences in the English department.

== Academic career ==
His doctoral dissertation and subsequent publications focused on Victorian literature, especially Dickens. Through examining the numerous screen adaptations of works by Dickens, Glavin's academic focus shifted to examining how literature is adapted for the screen.

== Influences ==
Former students who have identified Glavin's courses as foundational to their success as working professionals in the entertainment and writing industry include Jonathan Nolan, Nick Kroll, John Mulaney, Mike Birbiglia, Zal Batmanglij, Brit Marling, Andrew Morrison and R. F. Kuang. Nolan's Academy Award-nominated Memento includes the character named "John G." as a reference to the professor, whom Nolan regarded as a mentor who formed the basis for him to pursue writing professionally.

== Publications ==
Book length:

- After Dickens: Reading, Adaptation and Performance (Cambridge, 1999)
- Dickens on Screen (Edited volume, Cambridge University Press, 2003)
- Dickens Adapted (Ashgate, 2012)
- Death at the Edges (2017)
- The Good New (Vellum, 2018)

Short publications, chapters and reviews:

- "The Mandelbaum Gate: Muriel Spark's Apocalyptic Gag." Muriel Spark: 21st Century Perspectives, 29. Baltimore MD: Johns Hopkins University Press, 2010.
- Review of: 'Contemporary Dickens'. Victorian Studies (2009): 5.
