= John McMullin (silversmith) =

American silversmith

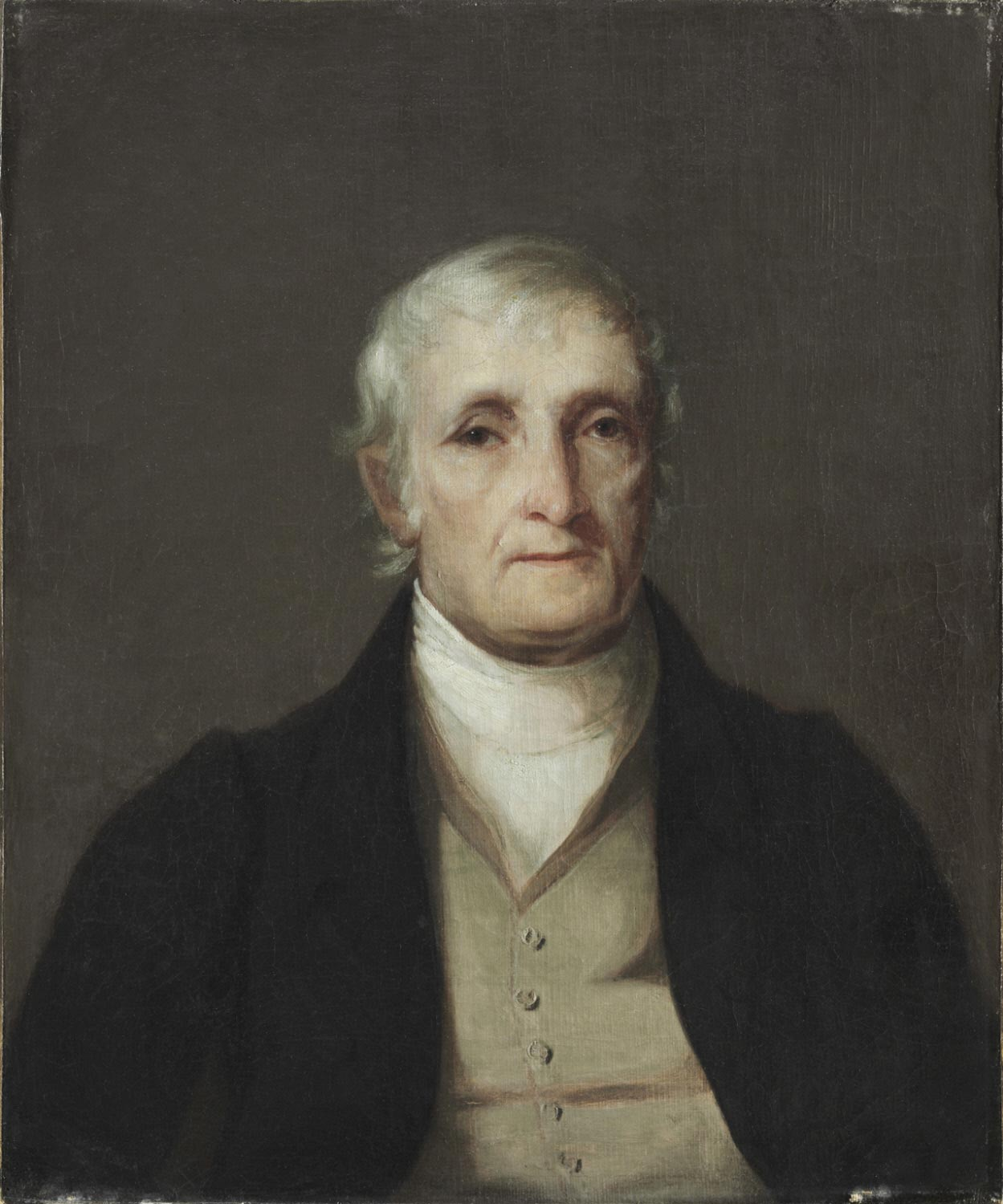
John McMullin by Joseph Biays Ord, 1834

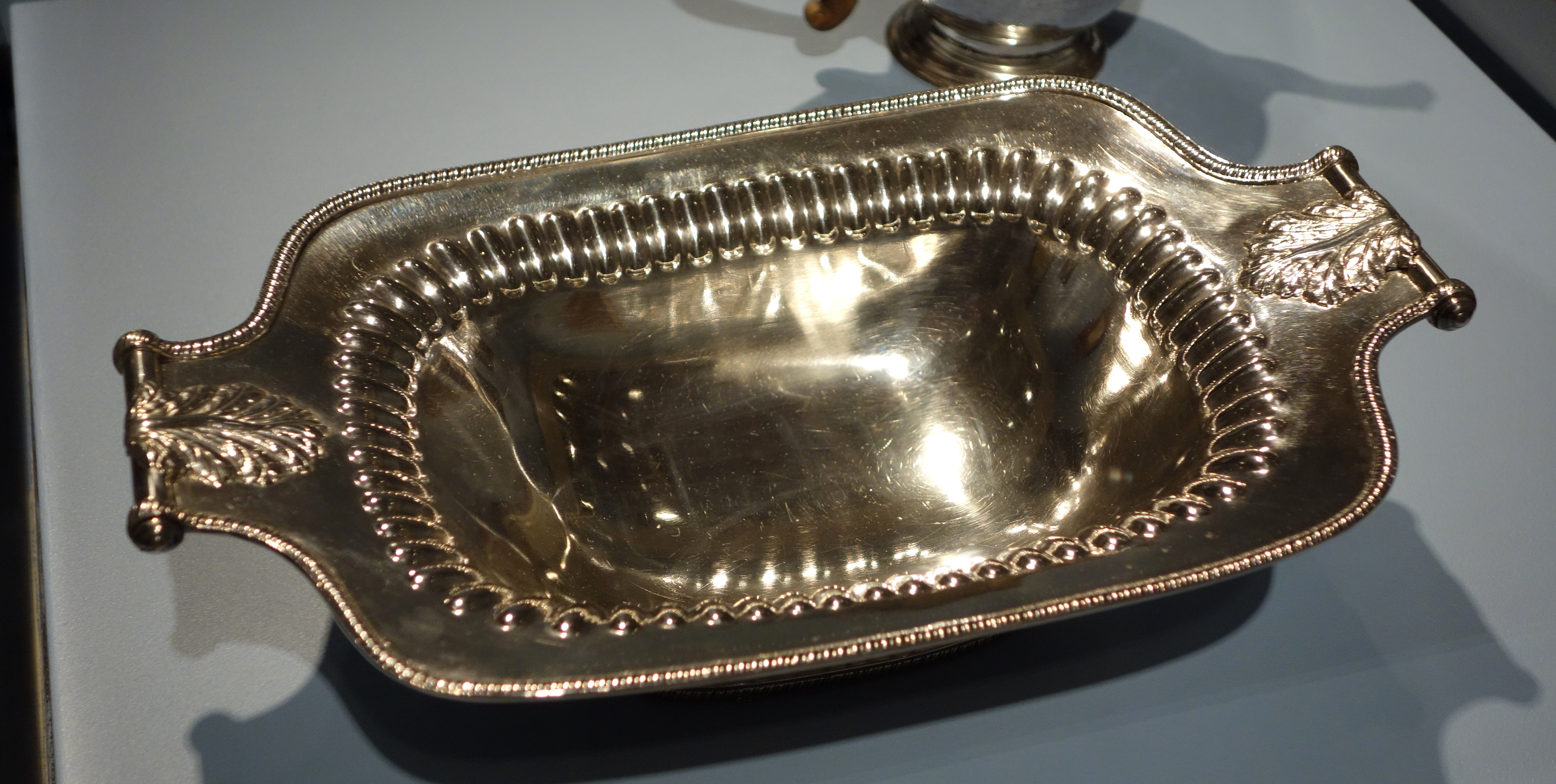
Basket by John McMullin, c. 1810-1820

John McMullin (October 18, 1765 – September 12, 1843) was an American silversmith, active in Philadelphia.

McMullin was born in Philadelphia. He worked in circa 1795—1810 as an individual silversmith and jeweler, then from 1811 to 1815 in a series of partnerships (1811-1813 with James Black as McMULLIN & BLACK, 1813—1814 with James McMullin, 1814—1815 with William Seal as SEAL & MCMULLIN) and finally on his own again from 1815—1841 as a silversmith and jeweler. During the French Revolution, he took in the Delormerie family and paid for Adelaide Celestis Delormerie's memorial when she died at the age of 16. McElroy's 1830 directory lists his address as 114 South Front Street. He died in Philadelphia, where he is buried in the Woodlands Cemetery. His work is collected in the Cincinnati Art Museum, the Metropolitan Museum of Art and, perhaps, the Museum of Early Southern Decorative Arts.

== Notes ==
- Linnard R. Hobler (2011). Pure, Bright & Solid: Raising a New Standard for John McMullin and his Silver (Masters thesis). Corcoran College of Art + Design.
- American Church Silver of the Seventeenth and Eighteenth Centuries: With a Few Pieces of Domestic Plate, Exhibited at the Museum of Fine Arts, July to December, 1911, Museum of Fine Arts, Boston, 1911, page 148.
- "John McMullin", American Silversmiths
- "John McMullen", Online Encyclopedia of Silver Marks, Hallmarks and Makers' Marks
- "Adelaide Celestis Delormerie", Historic Gloria Dei (Old Swedes') Preservation Corporation, Philadelphia
- Silversmiths & Related Craftsmen in McElroy's 1830 Philadelphia Directory.
