= Tabb =

Tabb may refer to:

== Places ==
- Tabb, Virginia, an unincorporated community in York County
- Tabb, West Virginia, a former unincorporated community in Berkeley County

== Other uses ==
- Tabb (surname)
- Tabb High School, in Tabb, Virginia (York County)
- Tabb Monument, in Amelia County, Virginia
- Tabb Street Presbyterian Church, in Petersburg, Virginia

== See also ==
- Tab (disambiguation)
- Tabby (disambiguation)
