= Tabb (surname) =

Tabb is a surname. Notable people with the surname include:

- Alf Tabb (1883−1976), English rider of miniature bicycles
- Barrington Tabb (1934–2022), English painter
- Bill Tabb (fl. 1985–1998), American professional wrestler known as The Black Assassin
- Brandon Tabb (born 1995), American basketball player
- Bruce Tabb (1927–2022), New Zealand accountancy academic
- Derrick Tabb (born 1975), American musician
- George Tabb, American punk rock musician
- Jaimi Tabb (born 2001), Australian rules footballer
- Jay Tabb (born 1984), Anglo-Irish professional football player
- Jerry Tabb (born 1952), American baseball player
- John B. Tabb (1845–1909), American poet and priest
- Loni Tabb, American biostatistician
- Mary Decker-Tabb (born 1958), American middle-distance runner
- Michaela Tabb (born 1967), Scottish snooker and pool referee
- Richard Prestridge Tabb (1846–1910), music librarian and publisher
- Ron Tabb (born 1954), American long-distance runner
- Thomas Tabb (burgess) (d. 1769) merchant and burgess from Amelia County, Virginia
- Wendell Tabb (born 1962), American educator and actor
- William Barksdale Tabb (1840–1874), Confederate army officer
- Winston Tabb, American librarian

== See also ==
- Tabb (disambiguation)
