= Tab =

Tab, TAB, tabs, or TABS may refer to:

== Places ==
- Tab, Hungary, a town
- Tab District, Hungary, whose seat is Tab
- Tab, Indiana, United States, an unincorporated community
- Arthur Napoleon Raymond Robinson International Airport, Tobago, IATA code TAB
- Tame Bridge Parkway railway station, station code TAB

== People ==
- Tab (given name)
- DJ Tab (born 1987), American hip hop DJ, record producer, and entrepreneur
- Mohammad Aram Tab (born 1985), Iranian footballer

== Arts, entertainment, and media ==
=== Music ===
- Tab (album), by US band Monster Magnet
- Tab or tablature, fingering-based musical notation, esp. for fretted instruments (e.g., guitars)
- Trey Anastasio (band), an unnamed band, 1999–2004
- Trey Anastasio Band, formerly 70 Volt Parade, 2006
- Dead Boots, a musical group originally known as "TAB the Band"
- "Tabs" a song by Lights from Skin & Earth Acoustic

=== Publishing formats ===
- Tab, a comic strip format
- Tab, a tabloid (newspaper format)

=== Other uses in arts, entertainment, and media ===
- The Australian Ballet, an Australian ballet company
- Tab, a character from Jet Set Radio
- The Tab, a youth news site published by Tab Media Ltd.
- Tâb, a board game
- Tab Communications, a newspaper publisher
- Tabs (stage), a theatre curtain at front of stage
- Totally Accurate Battle Simulator (TABS), a battle simulation video game
- Take a Break (magazine), a British women's magazine
- Tab International, a Toronto-based tabloid newspaper

== Aviation ==
- Servo tab, for moving an airplane's control surface with a small input force
- Trim tab, for adjusting the hands-free position of an airplane's control surface

== Brands and enterprises ==
- Tab (drink), a diet cola soft drink brand
- Samsung Galaxy Tab, a tablet computer
- Technical advisory board
- Totalisator Agency Board, organisation that runs betting agencies in Australia and New Zealand
- Transportes Aéreos Bolivianos, a cargo airline
- Travis Association for the Blind, Austin, Texas

== Computing and technology ==
- Tab (interface), a visual marker in a computer application
- .tab, a file-name extension for tab-separated values
- IE Tab, an extension for some web browsers
- MapInfo TAB format, a geospatial vector data format
- Tab character, a whitespace, control character
- Tab key (↹), on a keyboard

== Other uses ==
- Tab (archery), a small protective covering for the fingers
- Tab (cuneiform), a common use sign in the Amarna letters and the Epic of Gilgamesh
- Tab (debating), a modified form of Swiss tournament
- Tab, a Cantabrigian person
- TAB or Tab, the abbreviation in medicine and pharmacy for a medication given in tablet form
- Tab, an indicator on a file folder
- Tab, a loaded march in the British Army
- tab or Tabula, location of hand relative to rest of body, as a component of a sign-language sign
- Beverage can tab, a built-in miniature lever for unsealing
- Tab stop, where typewriter carriage movement is halted by an adjustable end stop
- Tabs of the United States Army, which denote skills
- TAB (armoured personnel carrier), a Romanian amphibious vehicle
- Tactical Advance to Battle, a British Army term for a loaded march
- Tape-automated bonding, in electronics
- Testing, adjusting, balancing, of HVAC systems
- Treehouse attachment bolt
- Tyabb railway station, Melbourne
- A restaurant bill or invoice, shortening of "tabulation"
- Tabcorp, an Australian sports betting company

== See also ==
- Tabb (disambiguation)
- Tablet (disambiguation)
- Pull tab (disambiguation)
