= Shell cordovan =

Equine leather

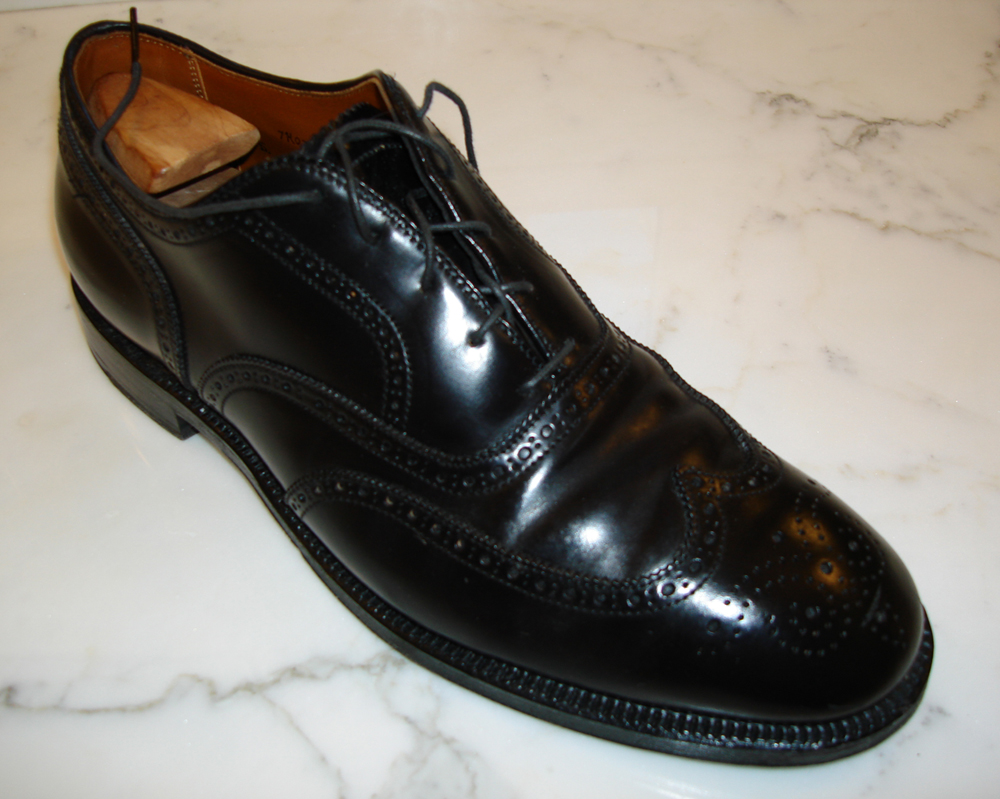
Shell cordovan oxford Brogue

Shell cordovan, cordovan, or cordwain is a type of tanned leather. Cordovan is an equine material made from the superficial fascia (or shell) of the lower layers of the hide on the rump of a horse. The material derives its name from the city of Cordoba, Spain, which was long known as a center of leather production and where this type of leather originated. It is a difficult and expensive material to make. Shell cordovan has a unique non-creasing characteristic. Because it is made of connective tissue, it is smooth and lacks the pebbled effect of leather derived from the outer skin.

== Production ==
After removal from the horse, the hide is measured from the root of the tail 18 inches (460 mm) forward on the backbone. The hide is cut at right angles to the backbone and the resulting pieces termed a "front" (the forward part) and the "butt". The term cordovan leather applies to the product of both the tanned fronts and tanned butts, but is especially used in connection with the term galoshes, meaning the vamps or boot-fronts cut from the shell of the butt.

After being tanned, leather from the "front" is typically used in the fabrication of gloves, or blackened, to be used in the tops of shoes. The "butt", after tanning, is passed through a splitting-machine which removes the grain, or hair side, revealing what is termed the "shell". The close fibers of the shell result in a smooth and pliable material.

== Uses ==
Historically, shell cordovan was used for razor strops to hone razors in barber shops. It is used mostly in the manufacture of shoes, including high-end shoemaking, and is also used for wallets and watch straps due to its visual appeal and durability. In archery, it is used to protect the fingers and is considered smooth and durable, ideal for a finger tab.

Outside leather crafting, "cordwain" denotes a leather-grain embossed cover paper used for folders, covers, and similar applications in commercial printing.
