= Tab (given name) =

Tab is a given name.

As a name for females, it may be a shortening of Tabitha.

Males known as "Tab" include:

- Tab Baker (1959–2010), American actor
- Tab Baldwin (born 1958), American-New Zealand basketball coach
- Tab Benoit (born 1967), American guitarist and singer
- Tab Hunter (1931–2018), American actor and musician
- Tab Murphy, American screenwriter
- Tab Perry (born 1982), former American football wide receiver
- Tab Ramos (born 1966), American soccer player
- Tab Smith (1909–1971), American swing and rhythm and blues alto saxophonist
- Tab Thacker (1962–2007), former NCAA wrestler and actor
- Tab Townsell, executive director of Metroplan

== See also ==
- Tab (disambiguation)
