= English longbow =

Type of ranged weapon

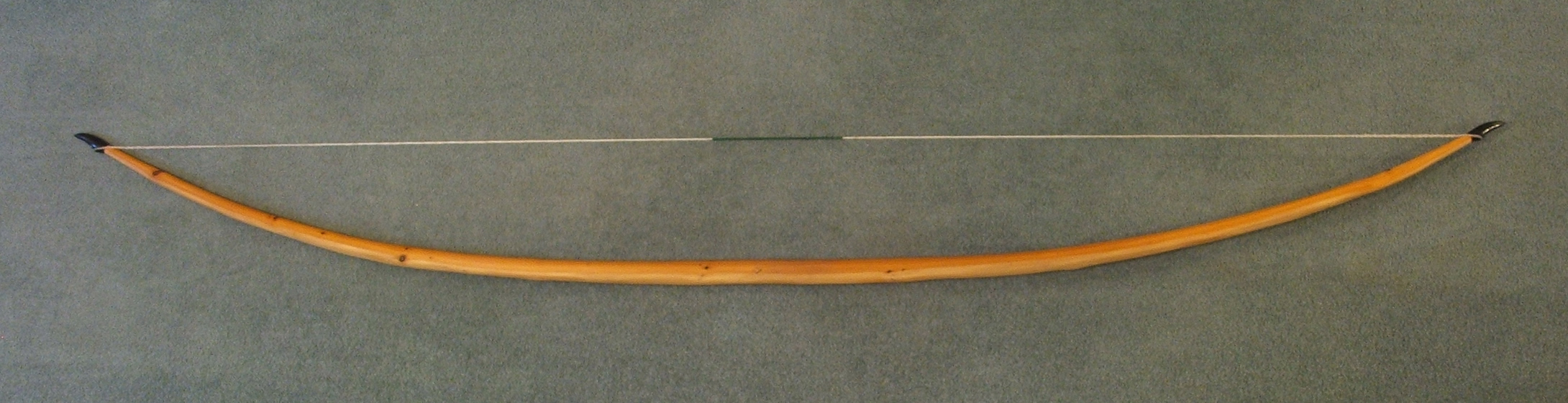
Self-yew English longbow, 6 ft 6 in (1.98 m) long , 470 N (105 lbf) draw force.

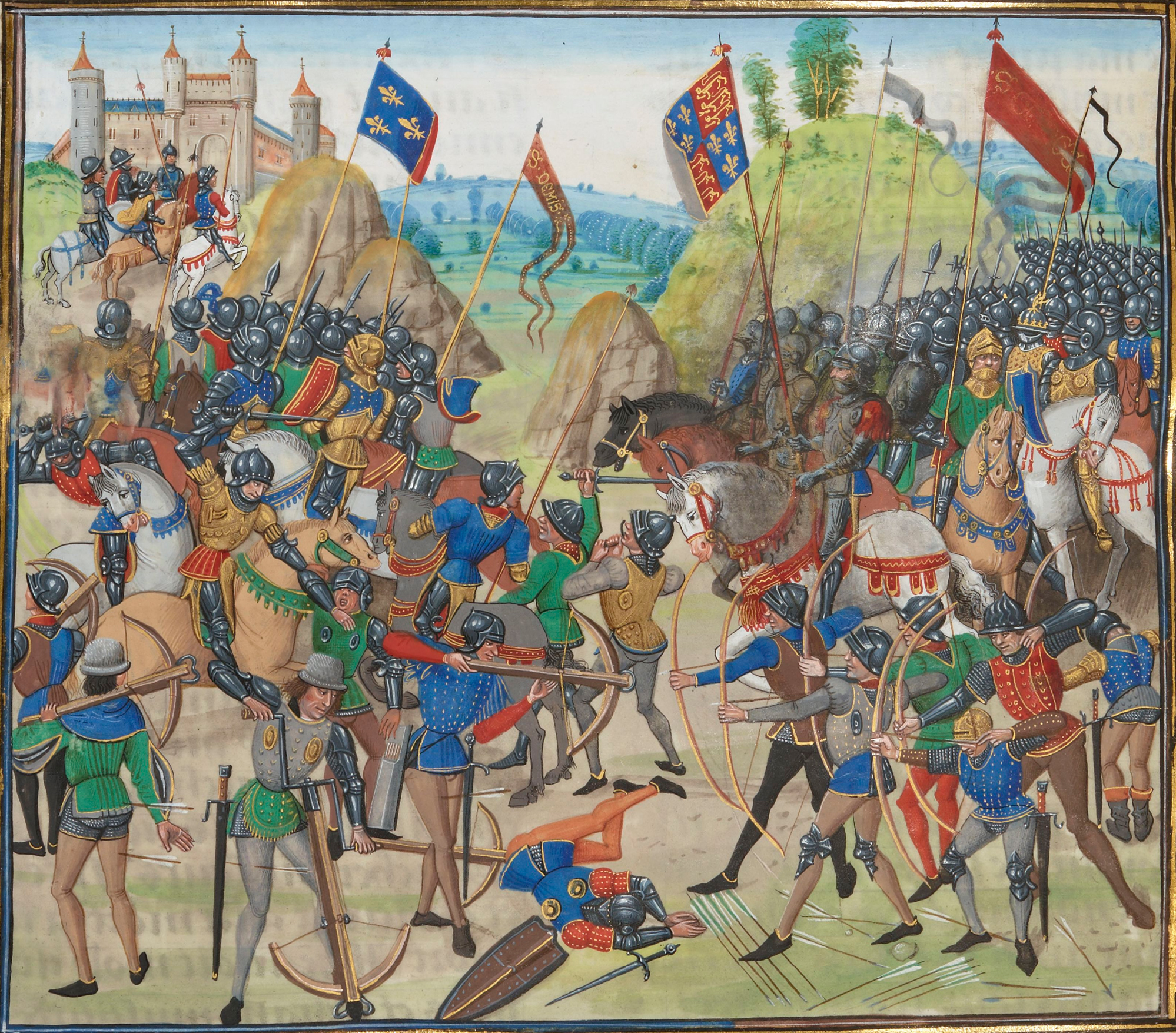
A late 15th century illustration of the Battle of Crécy. English longbowmen figure prominently in the foreground on the right, where they are driving away Italian mercenary crossbowmen.

The English longbow was a powerful medieval type of bow, about 6 ft (1.8 m) long. While it is debated whether it originated in England or in Wales from the Welsh bow, by the 14th century the longbow was being used by both the English and the Welsh as a weapon of war and for hunting. English longbows were effective against the French during the Hundred Years' War, particularly in the battles of Sluys (1340), Crécy (1346), Poitiers (1356), and Agincourt (1415). They were less successful later on, as longbowmen had their lines broken at the Battle of Verneuil (1424), although the English won a decisive victory there; they were completely routed at the Battle of Patay (1429) when they were charged by the French mounted men-at-arms before they had prepared the terrain and finished defensive arrangements. The Battle of Pontvallain (1370) had also previously shown longbowmen were not particularly effective when not given the time to set up defensive positions.

No English longbows have survived from the period when the longbow was dominant (c. 1250–1450). Bows become weaker after repeated use; it is likely that bows that had become weak or broke were disposed of, rather than being repaired or handed down through generations. However, around 137 bows from the Renaissance period survive, most of them recovered with more than 3,500 arrows from the Mary Rose, a ship of Henry VIII's navy that sank at Portsmouth in 1545.

== Description ==
=== Length ===
A longbow must be long enough to allow its user to draw the string to a point on the face or body, and the length therefore varies with the user. In continental Europe it was generally seen as any bow longer than 3 ft 11 in (1.2 m). The Society of Antiquaries of London says it is of 5 to 6 feet (1.5 to 1.8 metres) in length. Richard Bartelot, of the Royal Artillery Institution, said that the bow was of yew, 6 feet (1.8 m) long, with a 3-foot (910 mm) arrow. Gaston III, Count of Foix, wrote in 1388 that a longbow should be "of yew or boxwood, seventy inches (1.8 m) between the points of attachment for the cord". Historian Jim Bradbury said they were an average of about 5 feet 8 inches (1.73 m). All but the last estimate were made before the excavation of the Mary Rose, where bows were found ranging from 6 ft 2 in to 6 ft 11 in (1.87 to 2.11 m) with an average length of 6 ft 6 in (1.98 m).

=== Draw weights ===
Estimates for the draw of these bows varies considerably. Before the recovery of the Mary Rose, Count M. Mildmay Stayner, recorder of the British Long Bow Society, estimated the bows of the medieval period drew 90–110 pounds-force (400–490 newtons) maximum; W. F. Paterson, Chairman of the Society of Archer-Antiquaries, believed the weapon had a maximum draw weight of 80–90 lb_{f} (360–400 N). Other sources suggest significantly higher draw weights. The original draw forces of examples from the Mary Rose are estimated by Robert Hardy at 150–160 lb_{f} (670–710 N) at a 30-inch (76.2 cm) draw length; the full range of draw weights was between 100–185 lb_{f} (440–820 N). The 30-inch (76.2 cm) draw length was used because that is the length allowed by the arrows commonly found on the Mary Rose.

A modern longbow's draw is typically 60 lb_{f} (270 N) or less, and by modern convention measured at 28 inches (71.1 cm). Historically, hunting bows usually had draw weights of 50–60 lb_{f} (220–270 N), which is enough for all but the very largest game and which most reasonably fit adults can manage with practice. Today, there are few modern longbow archers capable of using 180–185 lb_{f} (800–820 N) bows accurately.

A record of how boys and men trained to use the bows with high draw weights survives from the reign of Henry VII.

[My yeoman father] taught me how to draw, how to lay my body in my bow ... not to draw with strength of arms as divers other nations do ... I had my bows bought me according to my age and strength, as I increased in them, so my bows were made bigger and bigger. For men shall never shoot well unless they be brought up to it.

— Hugh Latimer.

What Latimer means when he describes laying his body into the bow is described thus:

the Englishman did not keep his left hand steady, and draw his bow with his right; but keeping his right at rest upon the nerve, he pressed the whole weight of his body into the horns of his bow. Hence probably arose the phrase "bending the bow", and the French of "drawing" one.

— W. Gilpin.

=== Construction and materials ===
==== Bowstave ====
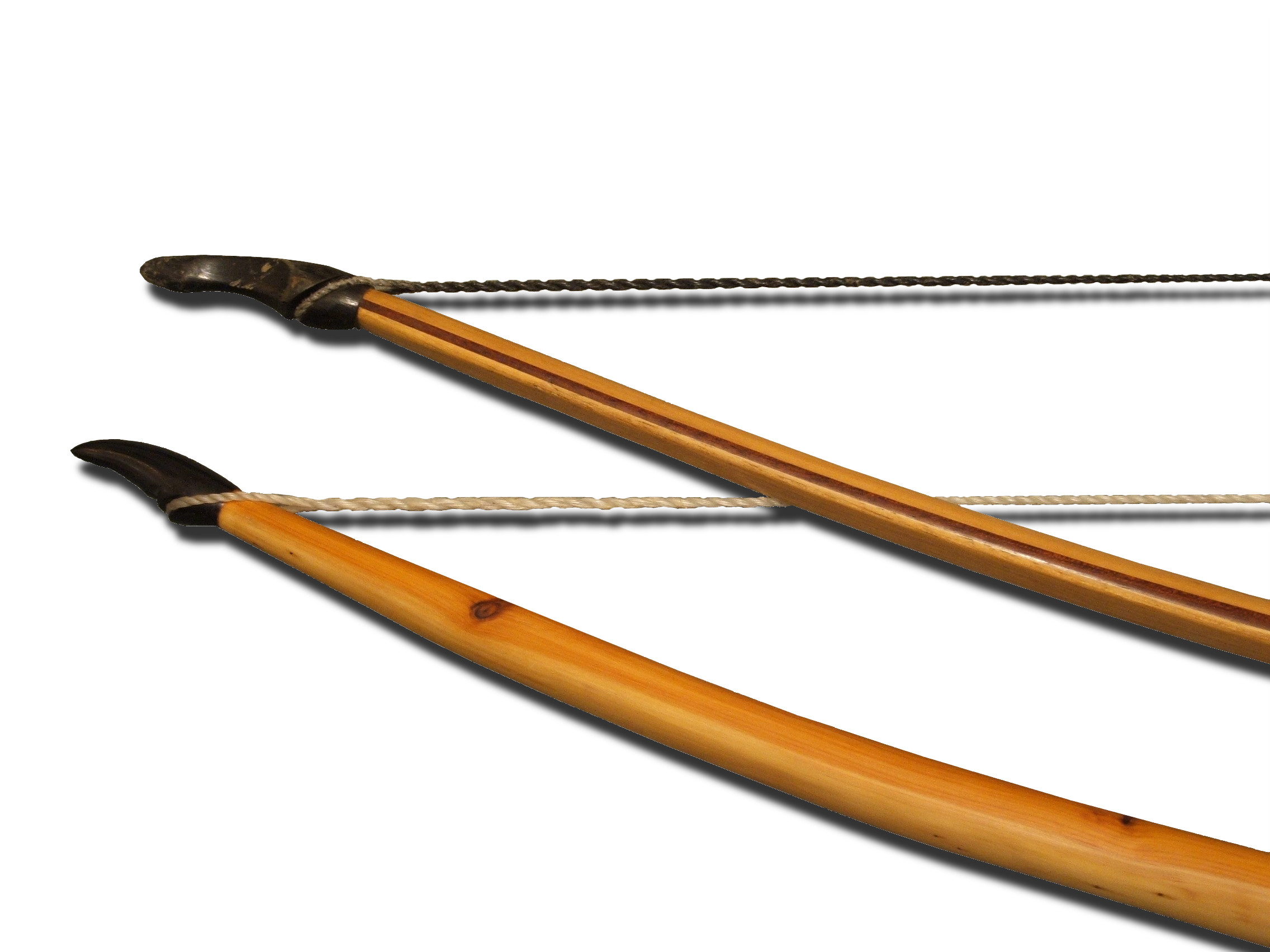
Self (bottom) and laminated (top) bows for comparison

The preferred material to make the longbow was yew, although ash, elm, and other hardwoods were also used. Gerald of Wales speaking of the bows used by the Welsh men of Gwent, says: "They are made neither of horn, ash nor yew, but of elm; ugly unfinished-looking weapons, but astonishingly stiff, large and strong, and equally capable of use for long or short shooting". The traditional way of making a longbow requires felling the tree and drying the wood for 1 to 2 years, then slowly working it into shape, with the entire process taking up to four years. The bow stave is shaped to have a D cross-section. The outer "back" of sapwood, approximately flat, follows the natural growth rings; modern bowyers often thin the sapwood, while in the Mary Rose bows the back of the bow was the natural surface of the wood, only the bark is removed. The inner side ("belly") of the bow stave consists of rounded heartwood. The heartwood resists compression, and the outer sapwood performs better in tension. This combination in a single piece of wood (a self bow) forms a natural "laminate", somewhat similar in effect to the construction of a composite bow. Longbows last a long time if protected with a water-resistant coating, traditionally of "wax, resin and fine tallow".

The trade of yew wood to England for longbows was such that it depleted the stocks of yew over a huge area. The first documented import of yew bowstaves to England was in 1294. In 1470 compulsory practice was renewed, and hazel, ash, and laburnum were specifically allowed for practice bows. Supplies still proved insufficient, until by the Statute of Westminster 1472, every ship coming to an English port had to bring four bowstaves for every tun. Richard III of England increased this to ten for every tun. This stimulated a vast network of extraction and supply, which formed part of royal monopolies in southern Germany and Austria. In 1483, the price of bowstaves rose from two to eight pounds per hundred, and in 1510 the Venetians obtained sixteen pounds per hundred.

In 1507 the Holy Roman Emperor asked the Duke of Bavaria to stop cutting yew, but the trade was profitable, and in 1532 the royal monopoly was granted for the usual quantity "if there are that many". In 1562, the Bavarian government sent a long plea to the Holy Roman Emperor asking him to stop the cutting of yew and outlining the damage done to the forests by its selective extraction, which broke the canopy and allowed wind to destroy neighbouring trees. In 1568, despite a request from Saxony, no royal monopoly was granted because there was no yew to cut, and the next year Bavaria and Austria similarly failed to produce enough yew to justify a royal monopoly. Forestry records in this area in the 17th century do not mention yew, and it seems that no mature trees were to be had. The English tried to obtain supplies from the Baltic, but in this period bows were being replaced by guns in any case.

==== String ====
Bowstrings are made of hemp, flax or silk, and attached to the wood via horn "nocks" that fit onto the end of the bow. Modern synthetic materials (often Dacron) are now commonly used for strings.

==== Arrows ====
A wide variety of arrows were shot from the English longbow. Variations in length, fletching and heads are all recorded. Perhaps the greatest diversity lies in hunting arrows, with varieties like broad-arrow, wolf-arrow, dog-arrow, Welsh arrow and Scottish arrow being recorded. War arrows were ordered in the thousands for medieval armies and navies, supplied in sheaves normally of 24 arrows. For example, between 1341 and 1359 the English crown is known to have obtained 51,350 sheaves (1,232,400 arrows).

Only one significant group of arrows, found at the wreck of the Mary Rose, has survived. Over 3,500 arrows were found, mainly made of poplar but also of ash, beech and hazel. Analysis of the intact specimens shows their lengths to range from 24 to 33 inches (61–83 cm), with an average of 30 inches (76 cm). Because of the preservation conditions of the Mary Rose, no arrowheads survived. However, many heads have survived in other places, which has allowed typologies of arrowheads to be produced, the most modern being the Jessop typology. The most common arrowheads in military use were the short bodkin point (Jessop M10) and a small barbed arrow (Jessop M4).

== Use and performance ==
=== Training ===
Longbows were very difficult to master because the force required to deliver an arrow through the improving armour of medieval Europe was very high by modern standards. Although the draw weight of a typical English longbow is disputed, it was at least 81 pounds-force (360 newtons) and possibly more than 130 lb_{f} (600 N). Considerable practice was required to produce the swift and effective combat shooting required. Skeletons of longbow archers are recognisably affected, with enlarged left arms and often osteophytes on left wrists, left shoulders and right fingers.

It was the difficulty in using the longbow that led various monarchs of England to issue instructions encouraging their ownership and practice, including the Assize of Arms of 1252 and Edward III of England's declaration of 1363:

Whereas the people of our realm, rich and poor alike, were accustomed formerly in their games to practise archery – whence by God's help, it is well known that high honour and profit came to our realm, and no small advantage to ourselves in our warlike enterprises... that every man in the same country, if he be able-bodied, shall, upon holidays, make use, in his games, of bows and arrows... and so learn and practise archery.

If the people practiced archery, it would be that much easier for the king to recruit longbowmen he needed for his wars. The level of expertise and years of training to effectively utilize the longbow combined with the advancement of plate armour caused the replacement of longbowmen with musketeers who required minimal training by comparison.

=== Range ===
The range is not accurately known, with much depending on both the bow and the type of arrow. It has been suggested that a flight arrow of a professional archer of Edward III's time would reach 400 yd (370 m). The longest mark shot at on the London practice ground of Finsbury Fields in the 16th century was 345 yd (315 m). In 1542, Henry VIII set a minimum practice range for adults using flight arrows of 220 yd (200 m); ranges below this had to be shot with heavy arrows. Modern experiments broadly concur with these historical ranges. A 150 lbf (667 N) Mary Rose replica longbow was able to shoot a 1.89 oz (53.6 g) arrow 359 yd (328 m) and a 3.38 oz (95.9 g) a distance of 273.3 yd (249.9 m). In 2012, Joe Gibbs shot a 2.25 oz (64 g) livery arrow 292 yd (267 m) with a 170 lbf (760 N) yew bow. In 2017, Hungarian master archer József Mónus set a flight world record with a traditional English longbow of 451.47 yards (412.82 m).

The effective combat range of longbowmen was generally lower than what could be achieved on the practice range as sustained shooting was tiring and the rigors of campaigning would sap soldiers' strength. Writing 30 years after the Mary Rose sank, Barnabe Rich estimated that if a thousand English archers were mustered, after one week only one hundred of them would be able to shoot farther than two hundred paces (167 yd (153 m)), and two hundred of the others would not be able to shoot farther than 180 paces.

=== Armour penetration ===
==== Modern testing ====
In an early modern test by Saxton Pope, a direct hit from a steel bodkin point penetrated Damascus mail armour. A 2006 test was made by Matheus Bane using a 75 lbf (330 N) draw (at 28 in (71 cm)) bow, shooting at 10 yards (9.1 m); according to Bane's calculations, this would be approximately equivalent to a 110 lbf (490 N) bow at 250 yards (230 m). Measured against a replica of the thinnest contemporary gambeson (padded jacket) armour, a 905 grains (58.6 g) needle bodkin and a 935 grain curved broadhead penetrated over 3.5 inches (89 mm). (gambeson armour could be up to twice as thick as the coat tested; in Bane's opinion such a thick coat would have stopped bodkin arrows but not the cutting force of broadhead arrows.) Against high quality riveted mail, the needle bodkin and curved broadhead penetrated 2.8 in (71 mm). Against a coat of plates, the needle bodkin achieved 0.3 in (7.6 mm) penetration. The curved broadhead did not penetrate but caused 0.3 in of deformation of the metal. Results against plate armour of 0.047 in (1.2 mm) thickness were similar to the coat of plates, in that the needle bodkin penetrated to a shallow depth, the other arrows not at all. In Bane's view, the plate armour would have kept out all the arrows if thicker or worn with more padding.

Other modern tests described by Bane include those by Williams (which concluded that longbows could not penetrate mail, but in Bane's view did not use a realistic arrow tip), Robert Hardy's tests (which achieved broadly similar results to Bane), and a Primitive Archer test which demonstrated that a longbow could penetrate a plate armour breastplate. However, the Primitive Archer test used a 160 lbf (710 N) longbow at very short range, generating 160 joules (vs. 73 for Bane and 80 for Williams), so probably not representative of battles of the time.

Tests conducted by Mark Stretton examined the effects of heavier war shafts (as opposed to lighter hunting or distance-shooting 'flight arrows'). The quarrel-like 3.6 oz (102 g) arrow from a yew 'self bow' (with a draw weight of 144 lbf (640 N) at 32 in (81 cm)) while travelling at 47.23 m/s (155.0 ft/s) yielded 113.76 joules, more kinetic energy than the lighter broadheads while achieving 90% of the range. The short, heavy quarrel-form bodkin could penetrate a replica brigandine at up to 40° from perpendicular.

In 2011, Mike Loades conducted an experiment in which short bodkin arrows were shot at a range of 10 yd (9.1 m) by bows of 140 lbf (620 N) – powerful bows at less than normal battlefield range. The target was covered in a riveted mail over a fabric armour of deerskin over 24 linen layers. While most arrows went through the mail layer, none fully penetrated the textile armour. Other research has concluded that later medieval armour, such as that of the Italian city-state mercenary companies, was effective at stopping contemporary arrows.

Computer analysis by Warsaw University of Technology in 2017 has estimated that heavy bodkin point arrows could penetrate typical plate armour of the time at up to 738 feet (225 m). However, the depth of penetration would be slight at that range, a mere 0.55 in (14 mm) on average; penetration increased as the range closed or against armour lesser than the best quality available at the time, but stopped at 0.94 in (24 mm), the highest penetration depth estimated at 82 ft (25 m) range, it was unlikely to be deadly.

In August 2019, the blacksmith YouTube channel 'Tod's Workshop', together with historian Tobias Capwell (curator at the Wallace collection), Joe Gibbs (archer), Will Sherman (fletcher) and Kevin Legg (armourer) ran a practical test using as close a recreation of 15th century plate armour (made with materials and techniques fitting to the time period) over a chainmail and gambeson against a 160 lbf (710 N) longbow. They shot a variety of arrows at the target, and the results showed that the arrows shot by a 160 lb longbow were unable to penetrate the front of the armour at any range, but the arrow that struck below the harness went right through the underlying protection.

==== Contemporary accounts ====
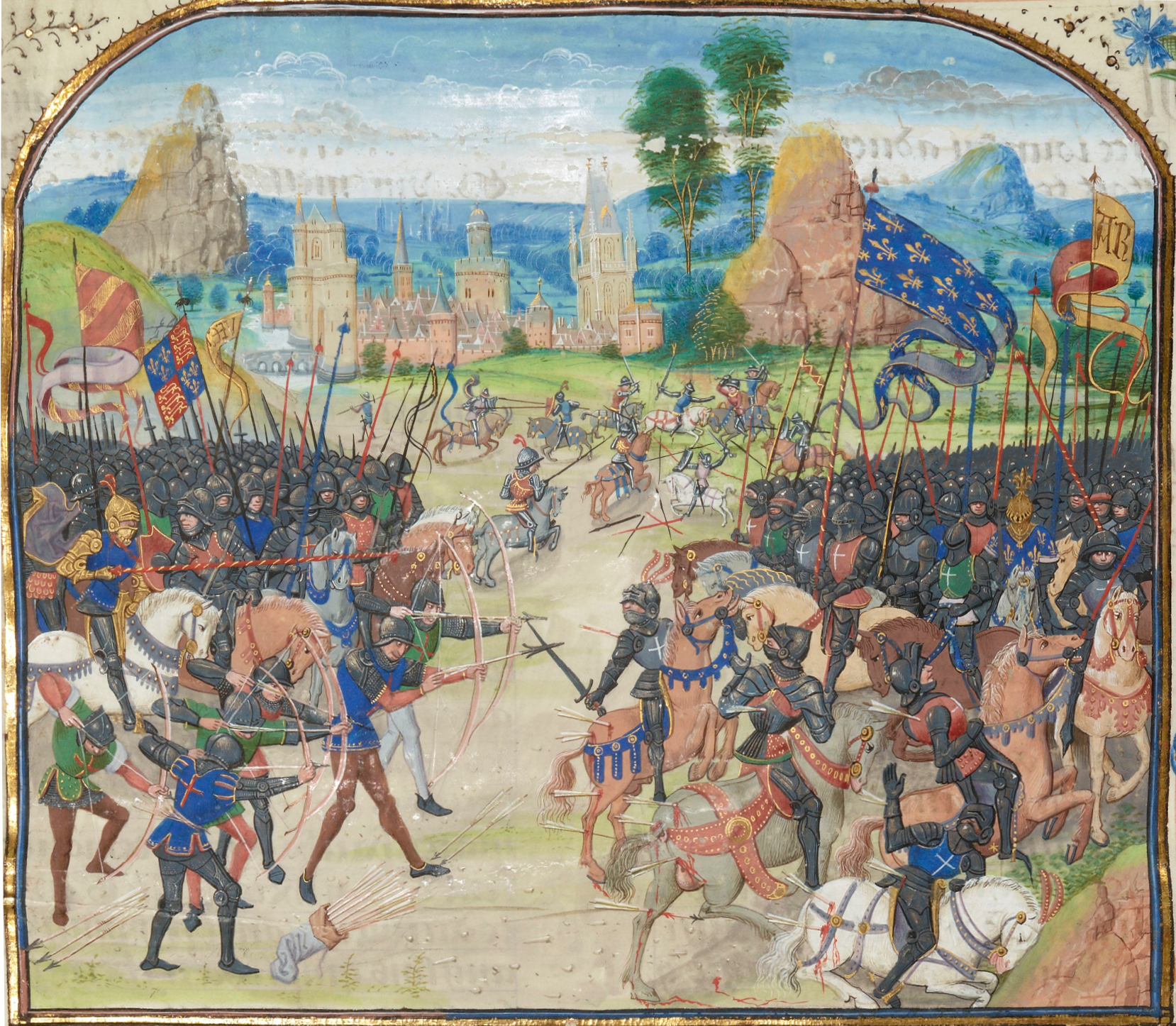
Archers at the Battle of Poitiers, 1356

Against massed men in armour, massed longbows were murderously effective on many battlefields. Strickland and Hardy suggest that "even at a range of 240 yards (220 m), heavy war arrows shot from bows of poundages in the mid- to upper range possessed by the Mary Rose bows would have been capable of killing or severely wounding men equipped with armour of wrought iron. Higher-quality armour of steel would have given considerably greater protection, which accords well with the experience of Oxford's men against the elite French vanguard at the Battle of Poitiers in 1356, and des Ursin's statement that the French knights of the first ranks at Agincourt, which included some of the most important (and thus best-equipped) nobles, remained comparatively unhurt by the English arrows".

Archery was described by contemporaries as ineffective against steel plate armour in the Battle of Neville's Cross (1346), the siege of Bergerac (1345), and the Battle of Poitiers; such armour became available to European knights and men at arms of fairly modest means by the middle of the 14th century, although never to all soldiers in any army. Longbowmen were, however, effective at Poitiers, and this success stimulated changes in armour manufacture partly intended to make armoured men less vulnerable to archery. Nevertheless, at Agincourt in 1415 and for some decades thereafter, English longbowmen continued to be an effective battlefield force.

Following the Battle of Crécy, the longbow did not always prove as effective. For example, at Poitiers the French men-at-arms formed a shield wall with which Geoffrey le Baker recounts "protecting their bodies with joined shields, [and] turned their faces away from the missiles. So the archers emptied their quivers in vain".

==== Summary ====
Modern tests and contemporary accounts agree therefore that well-made plate armour could protect against longbows. However, this did not necessarily make the longbow ineffective; thousands of longbowmen were deployed in the English victory at Agincourt against plate armoured French knights in 1415. Clifford Rogers has argued that while longbows might not have been able to penetrate steel breastplates at Agincourt they could still penetrate the thinner armour on the limbs. Most of the French knights advanced on foot but, exhausted by walking across wet muddy terrain in heavy armour enduring a "terrifying hail of arrow shot", they were overwhelmed in the melee.

Less heavily armoured soldiers were more vulnerable than knights. For example, enemy crossbowmen were forced to retreat at Crécy when deployed without their protecting pavises. Horses were generally less well protected than the knights themselves; shooting the French knights' horses from the side (where they were less well armoured) is described by contemporary accounts of the Battle of Poitiers (1356), and at Agincourt John Keegan has argued that the main effect of the longbow would have been in injuring the horses of the mounted French knights.

=== Shooting rate ===
A typical military longbow archer would be provided with between 60 and 72 arrows at the time of battle. Most archers would not shoot arrows at the maximum rate, as it would exhaust even the most experienced man. "With the heaviest bows [a modern war bow archer] does not like to try for more than six a minute." During repeated firing, the arms and shoulder muscles tire from the exertion, and the fingers holding the bowstring become strained; therefore, actual rates of shooting in combat would vary considerably. Ranged volleys at the beginning of the battle would differ markedly from the closer, aimed shots as the battle progressed and the enemy neared. Archers stored their arrows stabbed upright into the ground at their feet, reducing the time it took to nock, draw and loose. Massed longbowmen could produce a "storm" of arrows. Arrows were limited, so archers and their commanders rationed their use to the situation at hand. Nonetheless, resupply during battle was available. Young boys were often employed to run additional arrows to longbow archers while in their positions on the battlefield.

In tests against a moving target simulating a galloping knight it took some approximately seven seconds to draw, aim and loose an armour-piercing heavy arrow using a replica war bow. It was found that in the seven seconds between the first and second shots the target advanced 70 yards (64 m) and that the second shot occurred at such close range that, if it was a realistic contest, running away was the only option.

A Tudor English author expects eight shots from a longbow in the same time as five from a musket. He points out that the musket also shoots at a flatter trajectory, so is more likely to hit its target and its shot is likely to be more damaging in the event of a hit. The advantage of early firearms lay in the lower training requirements, the opportunity to take cover while shooting, flatter trajectory, and greater penetration.

=== Treating arrow wounds ===
Specialised medical tools designed for arrow wounds have existed since ancient times: Diocles (successor of Hippocrates) devised the graphiscos, a form of cannula with hooks, and duck-billed forceps (allegedly invented by Heras of Cappadocia) were employed to extract arrows. While armour-piercing "bodkin" points were relatively easy (if painful) to remove, barbed points required the flesh to be cut or pulled aside. An arrow would be pushed through and taken out the other side of the body only in the worst cases, as this would cause even more tissue damage and risk cutting through major blood vessels.

Henry, Prince of Wales, later Henry V, was wounded in the face by an arrow at the Battle of Shrewsbury. The royal physician John Bradmore had a tool made that consisted of a pair of smooth tongs. Once carefully inserted into the socket of the arrowhead, the tongs screwed apart until they gripped its walls and allowed the head to be extracted from the wound. Prior to the extraction, the hole made by the arrow shaft was widened by inserting larger and larger dowels of elder pith wrapped in linen down into the entry wound. The dowels were soaked in honey, now known to have antiseptic properties. The wound was then dressed with a poultice of barley and honey mixed in turpentine (pre-dating Ambroise Paré but whose therapeutic use of turpentine was inspired by Roman medical texts that may have been familiar to Bradmore). After 20 days, the wound was free of infection.

== History ==
=== Etymology ===
The word may have been coined to distinguish the longbow from the crossbow. The first recorded use of the term longbow, as distinct from simply 'bow', is possibly in a 1386 administrative document which refers in Latin to arcus vocati longbowes, "bows called 'longbows'", though the reading of the last word in the original document is not certain. A 1444 will proved in York bequeaths "a sadil, alle my longe bowis, a bedde".

=== Origins ===
The origins of the English longbow are disputed. While it is difficult to assess the significance of military archery in pre-Norman Conquest Anglo-Saxon warfare, it is clear that archery played a prominent role under the Normans, as the story of the Battle of Hastings shows. Their Anglo-Norman descendants also made use of military archery, as exemplified by their victory at the Battle of the Standard in 1138.

During the Anglo-Norman invasions of Wales, Welsh bowmen took a heavy toll of the invaders, and Welsh archers would feature in English armies from this point on. Giraldus Cambrensis toured Wales in 1188, recording in his Itinerarium Kambriae that the bows of Gwent were "stiff and strong, not only for missiles to be shot from a distance, but also for sustaining heavy blows in close quarters." He gave examples of the performance of the Welsh bow :

[I]n the war against the Welsh, one of the men of arms was struck by an arrow shot at him by a Welshman. It went right through his thigh, high up, where it was protected inside and outside the leg by his iron chausses, and then through the skirt of his leather tunic; next it penetrated that part of the saddle which is called the alva or seat; and finally it lodged in his horse, driving so deep that it killed the animal.

However, historians dispute whether this archery used a different kind of bow from the later English longbow. Traditionally it has been argued that prior to the beginning of the 14th century, the weapon was a self bow between four and five feet in length, known since the 19th century as the shortbow. This weapon, drawn to the chest rather than the ear, was much weaker. However, in 1985, Jim Bradbury reclassified this weapon as the ordinary wooden bow, reserving the term shortbow for short composite bows and arguing that longbows were a developed form of this ordinary bow. Strickland and Hardy in 2005 took this argument further, suggesting that the shortbow was a myth and all early English bows were a form of longbow. In 2011, Clifford Rogers restated the traditional case based upon a variety of evidence, including a large scale iconographic survey. In 2012, Richard Wadge added to the debate with an extensive survey of record, iconographic and archaeological evidence, concluding that longbows co-existed with shorter self-wood bows in England in the period between the Norman conquest and the reign of Edward III, but that powerful longbows shooting heavy arrows were a rarity until the later 13th century.

Whether there was a technological revolution at the end of the 13th century therefore remains in dispute. What is agreed, however, is that an effective tactical system that included powerful longbows used in mass was developed in the late 13th and early 14th centuries.

In 1295, Edward I began to better organize his armed forces, creating uniformly-sized units and a clear chain of command. He introduced the combined use of an initial assault by archers followed by a cavalry attack and infantry. The technique was later used effectively at the Battle of Falkirk in 1298.

The rising importance of foot troops, then, brought not only the opportunity but also the need to expand armies substantially. Then as early as the late 13th century, we can observe Edward I campaigning at the head of armies incorporating tens of thousands of paid archers and spearmen. This represented a major change in approaches to recruitment, organization, and above all pay.

=== 14th and 15th centuries ===
The longbow decided many medieval battles fought by the English and Welsh, the most significant of which were the Battle of Crécy (1346) and the Battle of Agincourt (1415), during the Hundred Years' War; these followed earlier successes, notably at the Battle of Falkirk (1298) and the Battle of Halidon Hill (1333) during the Wars of Scottish Independence. They were less successful after this, with longbowmen having their lines broken at the Battle of Verneuil (1424), and being routed at the Battle of Patay (1429) when they were charged before they had set up their defences, and with the war-ending Battle of Castillon (1453) being decided by the French artillery.

Although longbows were much faster and more accurate than the black-powder weapons which replaced them, longbowmen took a long time to train because of the years of practice necessary before a war longbow could be used effectively. In an era in which warfare was usually seasonal, and non-noble soldiers spent part of the year working at farms, the year-round training required for the effective use of the longbow was a challenge. A standing army was an expensive proposition to a medieval ruler. Mainland European armies seldom trained a significant longbow corps.

Due to their specialized training, English longbowmen were sought as mercenaries in other European countries, most notably in the Italian city-states and in Spain. The White Company, comprising men-at-arms and longbowmen and commanded by Sir John Hawkwood, is the best known English Free Company of the 14th century. The presence of English mercenaries led to a limited diffusion of the longbow until around 1430 in northern and central Italy, to the extent that in Milan and Florence there were craftsmen capable of producing bows and arrows "in the English manner." In 1373, the podestà of Reggio Emilia (then under Visconti control) requested that Ambrogio Visconti grant the inhabitants of the city and its countryside permission to equip themselves with bows and arrows "in the English manner" in order to defend themselves against enemy raids. King Louis I of Hungary used longbowmen in his Italian campaigns.

=== 16th century and later ===
Longbows remained in use until around the 16th century, when advances in firearms made gunpowder weapons a significant factor in warfare and such units as arquebusiers and grenadiers began appearing. Despite this, the English Crown made numerous efforts to continue to promote archery practice by banning other sports and fining people for not possessing bows. Indeed, just before the English Civil War, a pamphlet by William Neade entitled The Double-Armed Man advocates that soldiers be trained in both the longbow and pike; this advice was disregarded by other writers of the day, who accepted that firearms had supplanted the role of archery.

At the Battle of Flodden in 1513, wind and rain may have contributed to the ineffectiveness of the English archers against the Scottish nobles in full armour who formed the front rank of their advance, but when the opportunity arose to shoot at less well protected foot soldiers, the result was devastating. Despite his armour, King James IV of Scotland received several arrow wounds in the fighting, one of which may have caused his death. Flodden was the last major British battle in which the longbow played a significant part, even if not a decisive one. Longbows remained the main weapon of the trained bands (the home-defence militia of the Tudor period) until they were disbanded by Queen Elizabeth I in 1598. The last recorded use of bows in an English battle may have been a skirmish at Bridgnorth in October 1642 during the Civil War. Longbowmen remained a feature of the Royalist Army but were not used by the Roundheads.

Longbows have been in continuous production and use for sport and for hunting to the present day, but since 1642 they have been a minority interest, and very few have had the high draw weights of the medieval weapons. Other differences include the use of a stiffened non-bending centre section, rather than a continuous bend.

Serious military interest in the longbow faded after the 17th century, but occasionally schemes to resurrect its military use were proposed. Benjamin Franklin was a proponent in the 1770s; the Honourable Artillery Company had an archer company between 1784 and 1794, and a man named Richard Mason wrote a book proposing the arming of militia with pike and longbow in 1798. Donald Featherstone also records a Lt. Col. Richard Lee of 44th Foot advocated the military use of the longbow in 1792. Winston Churchill, in A History of the English-Speaking Peoples, writes:

The War Office has among its records a treatise written during the peace after Waterloo by a general officer of long experience in the Napoleonic wars recommending that muskets should be discarded in favour of the long-bow on account of its superior accuracy, rapid discharge, and effective range.

There is a record of the use of the longbow in action as late as WWII, when Jack Churchill is credited with a longbow kill in France in 1940. The weapon was certainly considered for use by Commandos during the war, but it is not known whether it was used in action.

== Tactics ==
=== Battle formations ===
The idea that there was a standard formation for English longbow armies was argued by Alfred Byrne in his influential work on the battles of the Hundred Years' War, The Crecy War. This view was challenged by Jim Bradbury in his book The Medieval Archer, and more modern works are more ready to accept a variety of formations.

In summary, however, the usual English deployment in the 14th and 15th centuries was as follows:

- Infantry (usually dismounted knights and armoured soldiers employed by the nobles and often armed with polearms such as pollaxes and bills) in the centre.
- Longbowmen were usually deployed primarily on the flanks, sometimes to the front.
- Cavalry was rarely used but, where deployed, either on the flanks (to make or protect against flank attacks), or in the centre in reserve, to be deployed as needed (for example, to counter any breakthroughs).

In the 16th century, these formations evolved in line with new technologies and techniques from the continent. Formations with a central core of pikes and bills were flanked by companies of "shot" made up of a mixture of archers and arquebusiers, sometimes with a skirmish screen of archers and arquebusiers in front.

== Surviving bows and arrows ==
More than 3,500 arrows and 137 whole longbows were recovered from the Mary Rose, a ship of Henry VIII's navy that capsized and sank at Portsmouth in 1545. It is an important source for the history of the longbow, as the bows, archery implements and the skeletons of archers have been preserved. The bows range in length from 6 ft 2 in to 6 ft 11 in (1.87 to 2.11 m) with an average length of 6 ft 6 in (1.98 m).The majority of the arrows are made of poplar, others are of beech, ash and hazel. Draw lengths of the arrows vary between 24 and 32 inches (61 and 81 cm) with the majority having a draw length of 30 inches (76 cm). The head would add 2.0 to 5.9 in (5 to 15 cm) depending on type, though some 0.79 to 1.77 in (2 to 4.5 cm) must be allowed for the insertion of the shaft into the socket.

The longbows on the Mary Rose were in excellent finished condition. There were enough bows to test some to destruction which resulted in draw forces of 100 lbf (450 N) on average. However, analysis of the wood indicated that they had degraded significantly in the seawater and mud, which had weakened their draw forces. Replicas were made and when tested had draw forces of 100 to 185 lbf (445 to 823 N).

In 1980, before the finds from the Mary Rose, Robert E. Kaiser published a paper stating that there were five known surviving longbows. One was from the Battle of Hedgeley Moor in 1464, during the Wars of the Roses. A family who lived at Alnwick Castle since the battle had preserved it to modern times. It is 65 in (1.66 m) and a 61 lbf (270 N) draw force. A bow hung in the rafters at the headquarters of the Royal Scottish Archers in Edinburgh, dating to the Battle of Flodden, which had a draw force of 81 to 92 lbf (360 to 410 N). A longbow was in the armoury of the church in Mendlesham, Suffolk, and is believed to date either from the period of Henry VIII or Queen Elizabeth I. The Mendlesham Bow is broken but has an estimated length of 68 to 69 in (1.73 to 1.75 m) and draw force of 79 lbf (350 N).

== Social importance ==
The importance of the longbow in English culture can be seen in the legends of Robin Hood, which increasingly depicted him as a master archer, and also in the "Song of the Bow", a poem from The White Company by Sir Arthur Conan Doyle. The Assize of Arms of 1252 required that all "citizens, burgesses, free tenants, villeins and others from 15 to 60 years of age" should be armed. The poorest of them were expected to have a halberd and a knife, and a bow if they owned land worth more than £2. This made it easier for the king to raise an army, but it also meant that the bow was a weapon commonly used by rebels during the Peasants' Revolt. From the time that the yeoman class of England became proficient with the longbow, the nobility in England had to be careful not to push them into open rebellion.

The importance of the longbow can also be seen in concerns at different points in time about a perceived decline in shooting skill. In the 16th century, commentators like the scholar and educationalist Roger Ascham, writing in his Toxophilus, published in 1545, were concerned that shooting proficiency was on a downward trajectory. Commentators like Ascham viewed archery as providing vital benefits, such as those to personal development and national security. Ascham's anxieties fitted into a trend of concern in English society for the state of archery going back to the 14th century.

It has been conjectured that yew trees were commonly planted in English churchyards to have readily available longbow wood.

== See also ==
- Infantry in the Middle Ages
