= Tabitha =

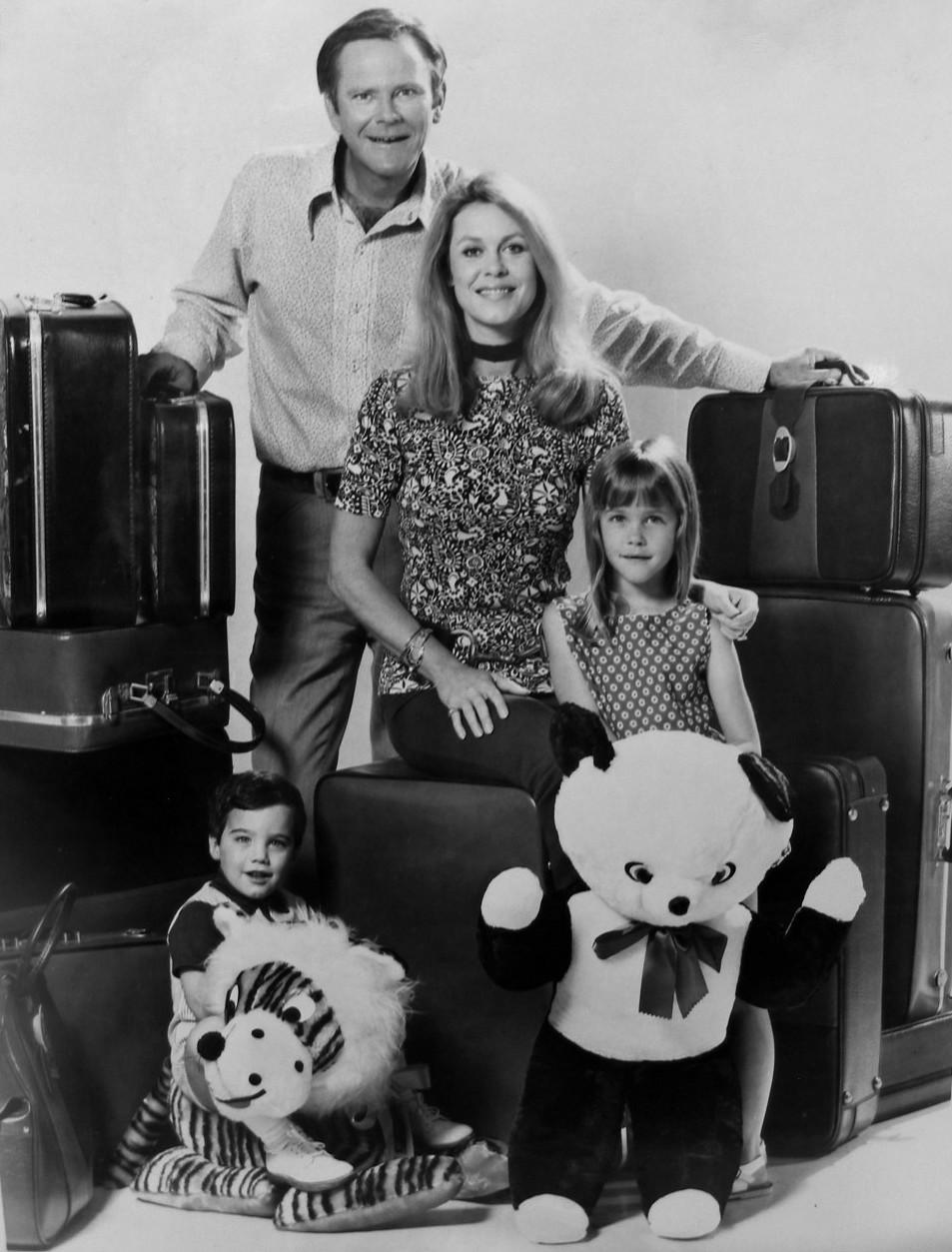
- The Stephens family from Bewitched: Dick Sargent (Darrin), Elizabeth Montgomery (Samantha) Erin Murphy (Tabitha), David Lawrence (Adam Stephens). The name Tabitha rose in use after the character appeared on the show.
- Pronunciation: /ˈtæbɪθə/
- Gender: Female

Origin
- Origin: Biblical
- Meaning: "Gazelle" and perhaps "Gracious"
- Region of origin: Aramaic

Other names
- Related names: Tabata, Tabatha, Tabathina, Tab, Tabby, Tabetha, Tabytha

Tabitha (/ˈtæbɪθə/, Koine Greek Ταβιθά tabitha, Aramaic טביתא tabitha "female gazelle") is an English feminine given name, originating with (or made popular through) Tabitha (Dorcas), mentioned in the New Testament Acts 9:36.

== In the Bible ==
Tabitha (also known as Dorcas, the Greek equivalent of the name, from δορκάς dorkas "≈ gazelle"), is a woman mentioned in the New Testament. The English name is derived from an Aramaic word, טביתא/ܛܒܝܬܐ ṭaḇīṯā "[female] gazelle", cf. Hebrew: צְבִיָּה Tzviya (classical ṣəḇīyāh). It is a biblical name from Acts of the Apostles (Acts 9:36), which in the original Greek was Ταβιθά, in which Tabitha, a benevolent woman, dies, then gets resurrected by Peter the Apostle.

== Use in the United States and the United Kingdom ==
The name was common in 18th century New England, and of those born between 1718 and 1745, ranked about 31st as most common female given names, about 0.56% of the population. The name gained a resurgence in the United States in the 1970s and 1980s, when it was ranked among the 200 most popular names for girls. The character Tabitha Stephens, a child witch on the 1960s television situation comedy Bewitched, raised the profile of the name. It was ranked among the 1,000 most popular names for girls born in the United States until 2016 and has since declined in usage. There were 142 American girls born in 2024 who were given the name.

The name has ranked among the 300 most popular name for girls in England and Wales between 1996 and 2020.

== People with the name Tabitha ==
=== Tabitha ===
- Dorcas (Biblical version of the name), or Tabitha (Aramaic version of the name), Christian woman raised from the dead by Saint Peter
- Tabitha Arnold (born 1995), American artist
- Tabitha Babbitt (1779–1853), American toolmaker and inventor, possible inventor of the circular saw
- Tabitha Byron (born 2010), British actress
- Tabitha Brown (1780–1858), American pioneer in the Oregon Territory
- Tabitha Chawinga (born 1996), Malawian footballer
- Tabitha D'umo (born 1973), American choreographer, dance teacher and creative director
- Tabitha Ann Holton (c. 1854–1886), first woman licensed as a lawyer in North Carolina
- Tabitha Karanja (born 1964), Kenyan businesswoman, entrepreneur and industrialist
- Tabitha King (born 1949), American author and wife of Stephen King
- Tabitha Love (born 1991), Canadian volleyball player
- Tabitha Lupien (born c. 1988), Canadian actress and competitive dancer
- Tabitha Nauser (born 1992), Singaporean singer
- Tabitha Peterson (born 1989), American curler
- Tabitha Sybil Quaye, Ghanaian politician and Member of Parliament (1992–1997)
- Tabitha Soren (born 1967), reporter for MTV News
- Tabitha St. Germain (born 1976), Canadian stage and voice actress
- Tabitha Stoecker (born 2000), British skeleton racer
- Tabitha Suzuma (born 1975), British writer
- Tabitha Gilman Tenney (1762–1837), American author and novelist
- Tabitha Tsatsa (born 1972), Zimbabwean marathon runner
- Tabitha Tuders (born 1990), American teenager girl who has been missing since 2003
- Tabitha Wady (born 1976), British actress
- Tabitha Yim (born 1985), American gymnast and coach

=== Tabatha ===
- Tabatha Badger, Australian politician
- Tabatha Coffey (born 1967), Australian hairstylist, salon owner and television personality
- Tabatha Forbes (born 1972), New Zealand botanical painter and textiles

== Places with the name Tabatha ==
- Tabatha, the birth place of Hilarion in Gaza

== Fictional characters ==
=== Comics ===
- Tabitha Smith, a Marvel superhero character

=== Literature ===
- Tabitha Twitchit, an anthropomorphic cat who features in the books of Beatrix Potter

=== Movies and television ===
- Tabitha Lenox, on the NBC daytime drama Passions
- Tabitha Stephens, a child witch from the 1960s American sitcom Bewitched and its 1970s spinoff Tabitha
- Tabitha Tate, a main character in late seasons in TV show Riverdale
- Tabitha Wilson, on the American teen drama series 90210

=== Video games ===
- Tabitha, a Team Magma Admin from Pokémon Ruby and Sapphire and Pokémon Omega Ruby and Alpha Sapphire

== See also ==
- Tabby (disambiguation)
