= William Neade =

William Neade (fl. 1624–1637) was an English inventor, known for inventing a weapon combining a longbow and a pike.

== The invention ==
Neade began experiments in James I's reign with a "warlike invention of the bow and the pike", an arrangement by which a bow could be attached to a movable pivot in the middle of the pike, thus making a combined weapon for offence or for close quarters. In 1624 he exhibited his invention before the King in St James's Park, and the Honourable Artillery Company soon afterwards made trial of it.

A manuscript Neade had presented to the King was published in 1625, with six plates, as The double-armed man, by the new invention: briefly shewing some famous exploits atchieved by our Brittish bowmen, with severall portraitures proper for the pike and bow.

In July 1633, he petitioned the council to approve "a direction for a commission to authorise the inventor to teach the service and for a proclamation to command the general exercise thereof". On 12 August, the proclamation was issued at Oatlands Palace, and five days later a commission was given to Neade and his son William to instruct lieutenants of counties and justices of the peace in the exercise. The specification of the patent which was granted to Neade in the following year recites that he had spent many years in practising the weapon.

In 1635, and again in 1637, Neade informed the King that he had laid out his whole estate of £600 on his invention, "but by the evil example of the city of London the service is now wholly neglected", although three hundred of the Artillery Company had given an exhibition of the weapon in action before King Charles in St James's Park. The council seems to have meditated some fresh concessions to Neade, but no further reference to the matter exists.
