= 59th Virginia Infantry Regiment =

- Flag of Virginia, 1861
- Active: Aug. 1861 – April 1865
- Disbanded: April 1865
- Country: Confederate States of America
- Allegiance: Virginia
- Branch: Confederate States Army
- Type: Infantry
- Engagements: American Civil War: Battle of Roanoke Island; Seven Days' Battles; Second Battle of Bull Run; Battle of Antietam; Battle of Fredericksburg; Siege of Suffolk; Battle of Gettysburg; Siege of Charleston; Battle of Legareville; Overland Campaign; Siege of Petersburg; Battle of Sayler's Creek; Appomattox Campaign

Commanders
- Notable commanders: William Barksdale Tabb

The 59th Virginia Infantry Regiment was an infantry regiment raised in Virginia's western counties for service in the Confederate States Army during the American Civil War. It fought mostly with the Army of Northern Virginia, and in the Carolinas.

The 59th Virginia (also called 2nd Regiment, Wise Legion) was organized in August 1861. Part of this unit was captured at Roanoke Island in February 1862. Four of the companies were not captured and were reorganized as the 26th Virginia Infantry Battalion, along with additional recruits. These companies never returned to the 59th. The original composition of the 59th consisted of men from five counties in West Virginia, eight counties in Virginia, and one company each from Louisiana, North Carolina and Mississippi.

After his exchange Gen. Wise spent several months trying to reorganize the regiment, which was completed on November 1, 1862. For most of 1863 the 59th was occupied in fortifying defensive positions around Richmond and Petersburg. Later the regiment was transferred to the Department of South Carolina, Georgia, and Florida, and participated in various conflicts around Charleston. Returning to Virginia in the spring of 1864 it was placed in the Petersburg trenches, then fought in the Appomattox Campaign. Many were disabled at Sayler's Creek, and none of its members were present at the surrender.

The field officers were Colonels Charles F. Henningsen and William B. Tabb, Lieutenant Colonels Frank P. Anderson and Joseph Jones, and Majors John Lawson and Robert G. Mosby.

== Companies ==
The four companies of the 59th Virginia that became part of the 26th Virginia Infantry Battalion were:.

- Company A: Charleston Sharpshooters, Captain John S. Swann
- Company E: Scouts and Guides, Captain William D. Hefner
- Company F: Red Sulphur Yankee Hunters, Captain Richard Woodrum
- Company G: White Sulphur Rifles, Captain Z.F. Morris

== See also ==
- List of Virginia Civil War units
- List of West Virginia Civil War Confederate units
