= Statute of Westminster 1472 =

- Act of Parliament
- Parliament of England
- Citation: 12 Edw. 4
- Territorial extent: England and Wales; Ireland

Dates
- Royal assent: 6 October 1472
- Commencement: 6 October 1472 (Note: Start of session.)
- Repealed: 10 August 1872

Other legislation
- Amended by: Statute Law Revision Act 1863
- Repealed by: Statute Law (Ireland) Revision Act 1872

Status: Repealed

Text of statute as originally enacted

The Statute of Westminster 1472 (12 Edw. 4) was an act of the Parliament of England passed by Edward IV of England requiring a tax of four bow staves per tun of cargo to be provided by each ship arriving at an English Port.

In 1470, an edict had been passed requiring compulsory training in the use of the longbow. This resulted in a shortage of yew wood. The statute sought to overcome this shortage.

== Legacy ==
The act was extended to Ireland by Poynings' Law 1495 (10 Hen. 7. c. 22 (I)).

The whole act was repealed for England and Wales by section 1 of, and the schedule to, the Statute Law Revision Act 1863 (26 & 27 Vict. c. 125) and for Ireland by section 1 of, and the schedule to, the Statute Law (Ireland) Revision Act 1872 (35 & 36 Vict. c. 98).
