= Pull tab =

Pull tab may refer to:

- Tab (beverage can), a built-in device used to open a beverage can
- Pull-tab, a game using gambling tickets

== See also ==
- Pull (disambiguation)
- Tab (disambiguation)
