= Tabb Monument =

State park in Virginia, United States

Coordinates: 37.433035°N 77.957001°W

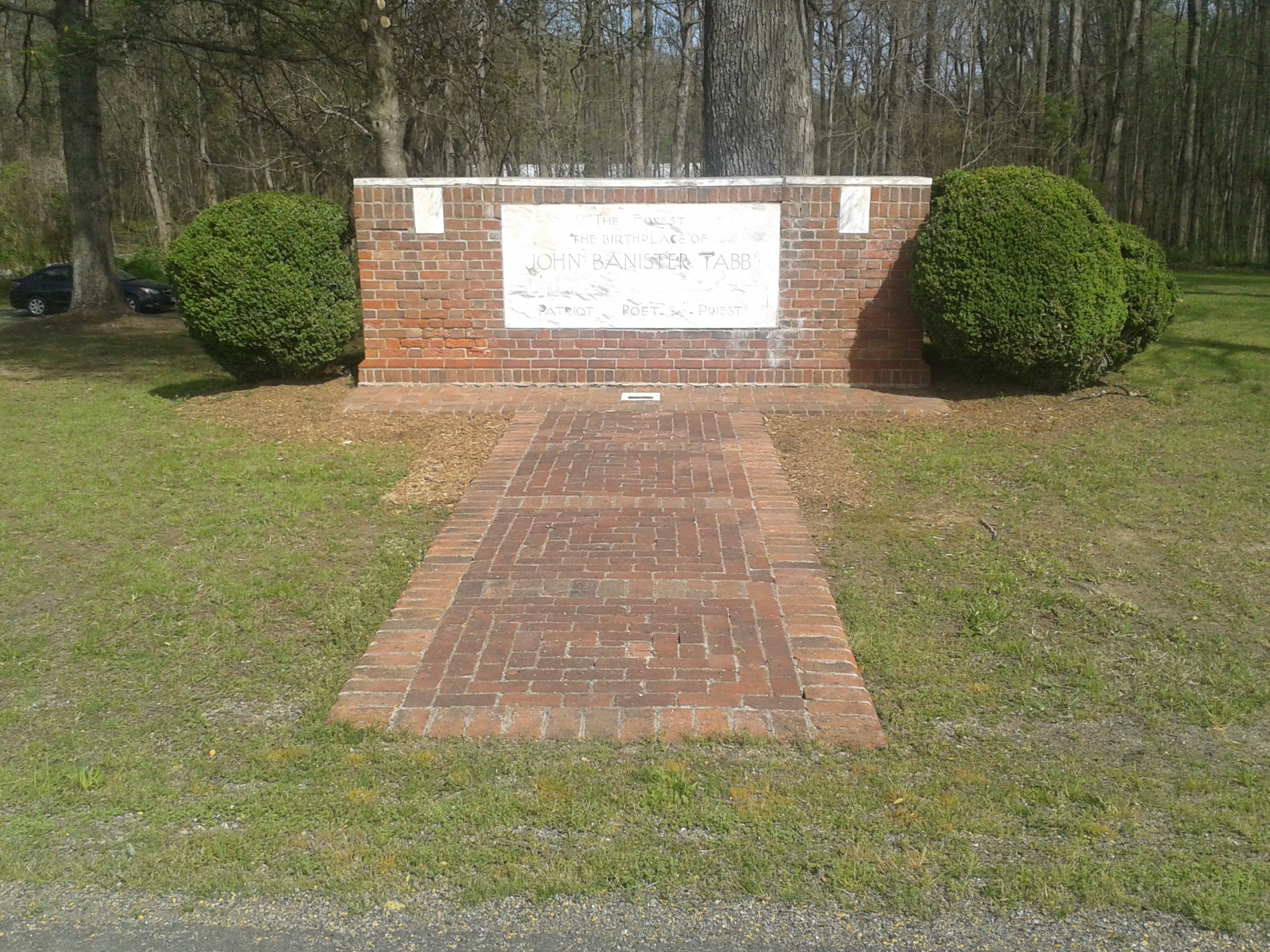
The Tabb Monument in 2017

The Tabb Monument, dedicated in 1936, is a one-acre (4,000 m^{2}) monument in Amelia County, Virginia dedicated to Virginia-born Catholic poet John Banister Tabb.

== History ==
In 1935, admirers of John Banister Tabb began raising funds for a monument in "The Forest," near Tabb's birthplace in Amelia County. The Forest Memorial Association was led by faculty at the University of Notre Dame including Francis W. Kervick (secretary and treasurer); T. Bowyer Campbell, acting dean of the college of arts and letters; Rev. Eugene Burke, CSC; and John Cooney. In 1936, membership of the Association reportedly included clergy and laymen in twelve states.

Kervick, a member of the architecture faculty at Notre Dame, designed the monument. Land for the monument was deeded to the state of Virginia by Ephraim and Ida M. Anderson. The monument was officially dedicated on November 7, 1936. George C. Peery, then-governor of Virginia, spoke at the dedication ceremony.

== Attractions ==
The monument was updated with two interpretational signs in April 2007.

The monument is located north of Amelia Court House off Grub Hill Church Road (Virginia State Route 609). It is surrounded by a manicured grass lawn with scattered large trees, with more dense woodland adjacent to the monument site. Typical woodland and edge bird species make up the local wildlife, while in the field across the nearby road dedicated birders may observe species like the eastern meadowlark, indigo bunting, and blue grosbeak. The monument has a small gravel parking lot, but there are no trails, restrooms, or other amenities.
