= Thumb ring =

Ring to protect the thumb during archery

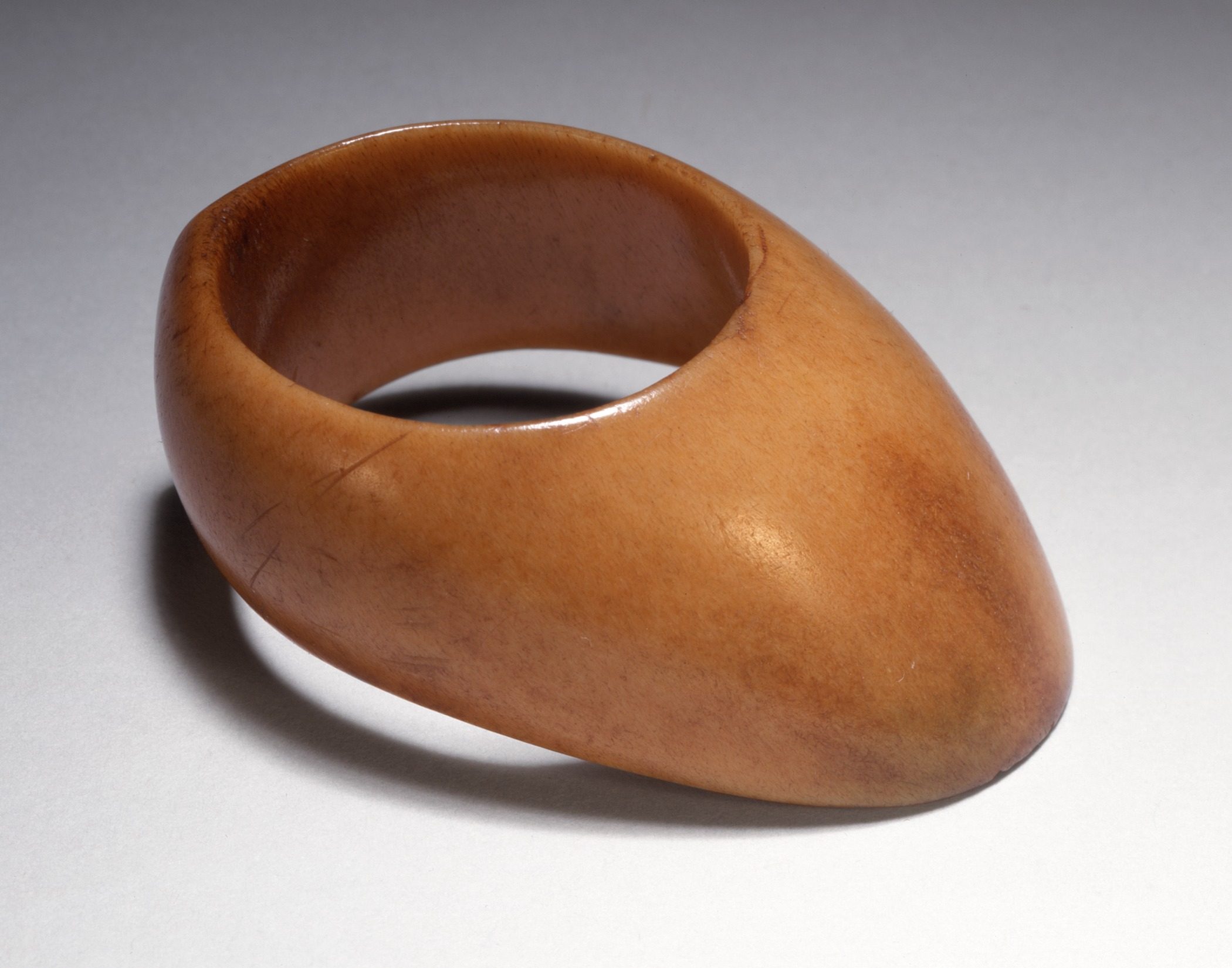
17th century Mughal thumb ring

A thumb ring is a ring meant to be worn on one's thumb. Most commonly, thumb rings are used as an archery equipment designed to protect the thumb pulp from the bowstring during a thumb draw, and are made of leather, stone, horn, wood, bone, antler, ivory, metal, ceramics, plastic or glass. It usually fits over the distal phalanx of the thumb, coming to rest at the distal edge of the interphalangeal joint. Typically a flange extends from the ring to cover the thumb pulp, and may be supplemented by a leather extension.

In some cultures, thumb rings also serve a decorative function like other types of rings, and are used to signal social status or ranks. In East Asia, such thumb rings are usually made of jade.

== Uses ==
=== Archery ===
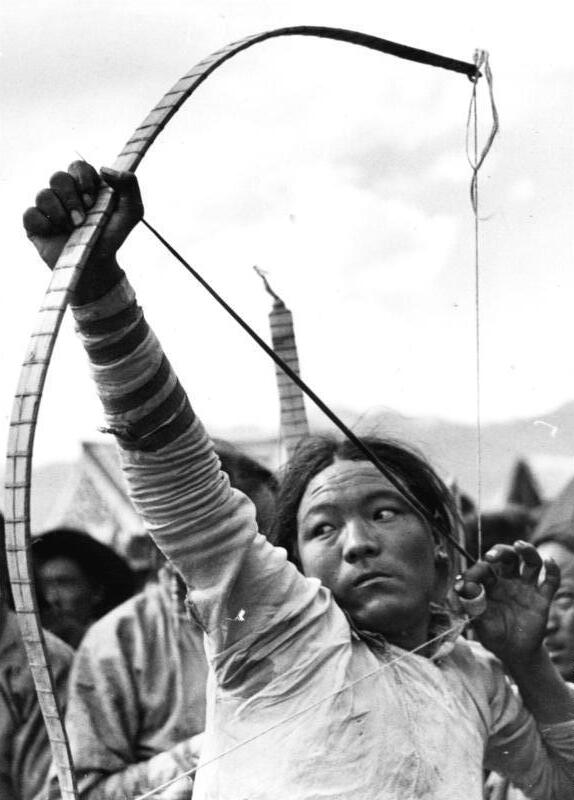
Tibetan archer using a cylindrical thumb ring, 1938

The most common use of a thumb ring throughout history has been its role in archery. When drawing a bow using a thumb draw, the thumb is hooked around the bowstring just beneath the arrow and its grip reinforced with the first (sometimes second) finger. The bowstring rests against the inner pad of the archer's thumb and the thumb ring protects the skin. The bowstring rests against the flat of the ring when the bow is drawn. Today, thumb rings are used by archers practicing styles from most of Asia and some regions of northern Africa.

=== Jewellery ===
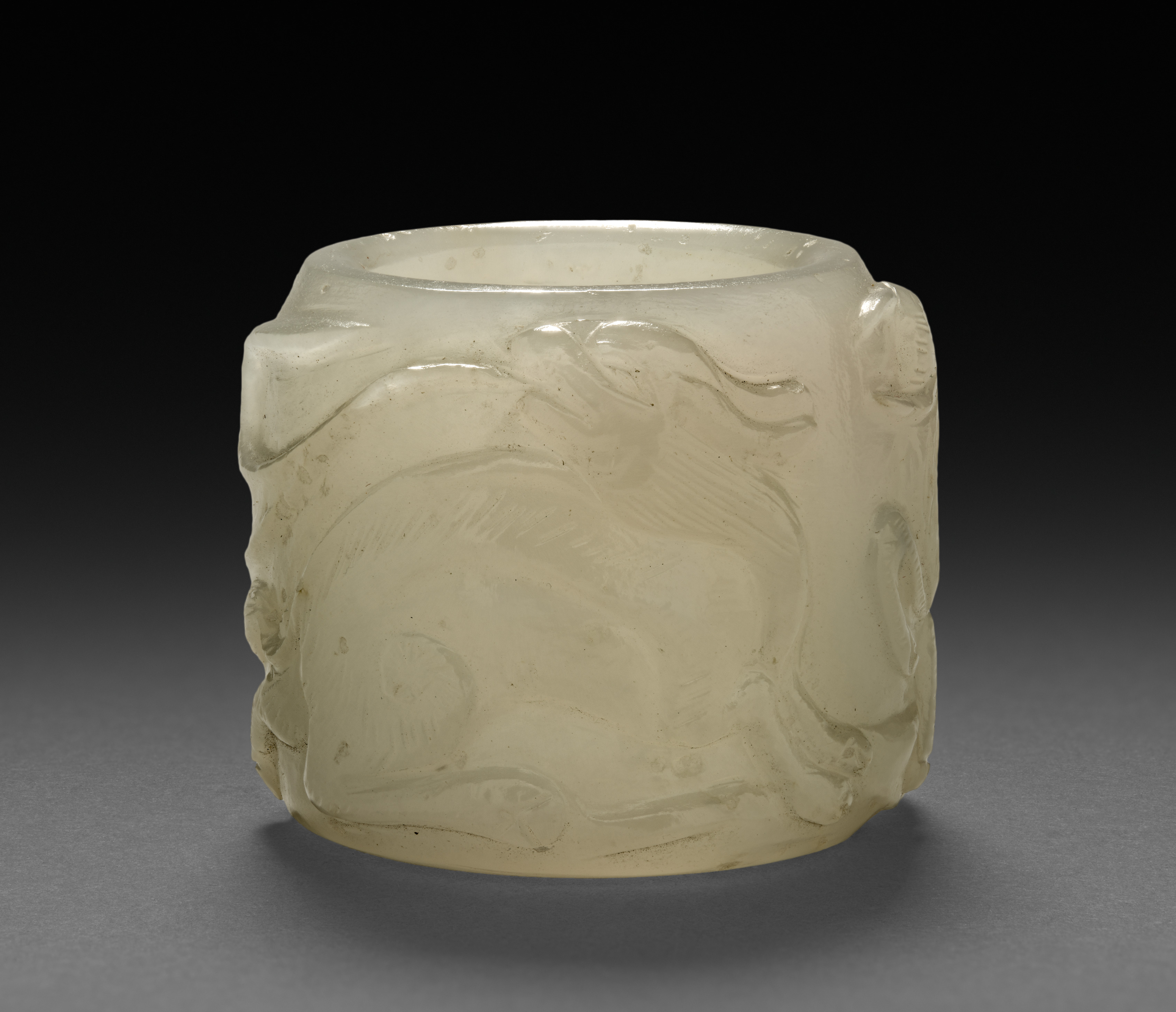
Decorative nephrite thumb ring with qilin engraving

According to some ancient beliefs, wearing a thumb ring can ward off spells, misfortunes, and illness. In many cases, these thumb rings would be engraved with specific symbols to further scare off evil spirits, demons, and dark scourges.

Starting in Ancient Greek societies, wearing thumb rings was a symbol of power, rank, wealth, and influence. In some cases, the highest and wealthiest authorities would wear multiple thumb rings to prove their importance. This usage is still in practice in many countries today.

In Ancient China, thumbs rings are commonly made out of jade and worn specifically to signify military ranks or seniorities in religious sects.

== Historic specimens ==
Thumb rings have been in use in Asia since the Neolithic period. The first examples were likely made of leather, but artifacts made entirely of leather do not last thousands of years. Surviving artifact rings are made of bone, horn, or stone; presumably most would have incorporated a leather guard. Comparison with historical and modern rings shows little functional change over the millennia. In the cemetery of the small Rui state at Liangdaicun near Hancheng on the Yellow River (where it flows south between the provinces of Shaanxi and Shanxi), a Lord of Rui was interred in a tomb, M 27, dated to the eighth century BCE. His grave goods included two thumb rings, made of gold but of an entirely modern pattern.

The author of "Arab Archery" refers to rings as being usually made of leather. A "thumb tip" or "thumb ring" which is called "kustubān" by the Persian and "khayta‘ah" by the Arabs, consists of a ring of leather or some other material. It is worn over the right thumb, leaving the nail and knuckle exposed, and is used for the protection of the thumb against injuries which are usually caused by the string when it is drawn and released." Possibly, most ordinary archers historically used tabs of leather, much cheaper and easier to make, but such rings are not likely to survive. Metal thumb rings of silver or bronze were thought to be too inflexible in use, and thus were less accurate.

Many surviving historic thumbrings are hardstone carvings in jade and other gemstones, or are made of precious metal. Most are very practical but some have the release surface so ornamented as to be unusable. The rings could be displayed on a cord from the belt, or, in China, in a special box. In the 16th century court of the Ottoman Empire they had the extra function of being "used when executing disgraced officials to tighten a handkerchief wound round the throat".

== Variants ==
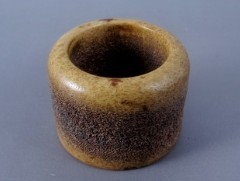
A cylindrical Manchu thumbring. The thumb hole is typically round.

In territories of the Qing dynasty, Manchurian cylindrical thumb rings gradually displaced more thumb pad shaped thumb rings. These cylindrical thumb rings would go over the primary thumb joint, hooking the draw string around the base of the cylinder.

== Gallery ==
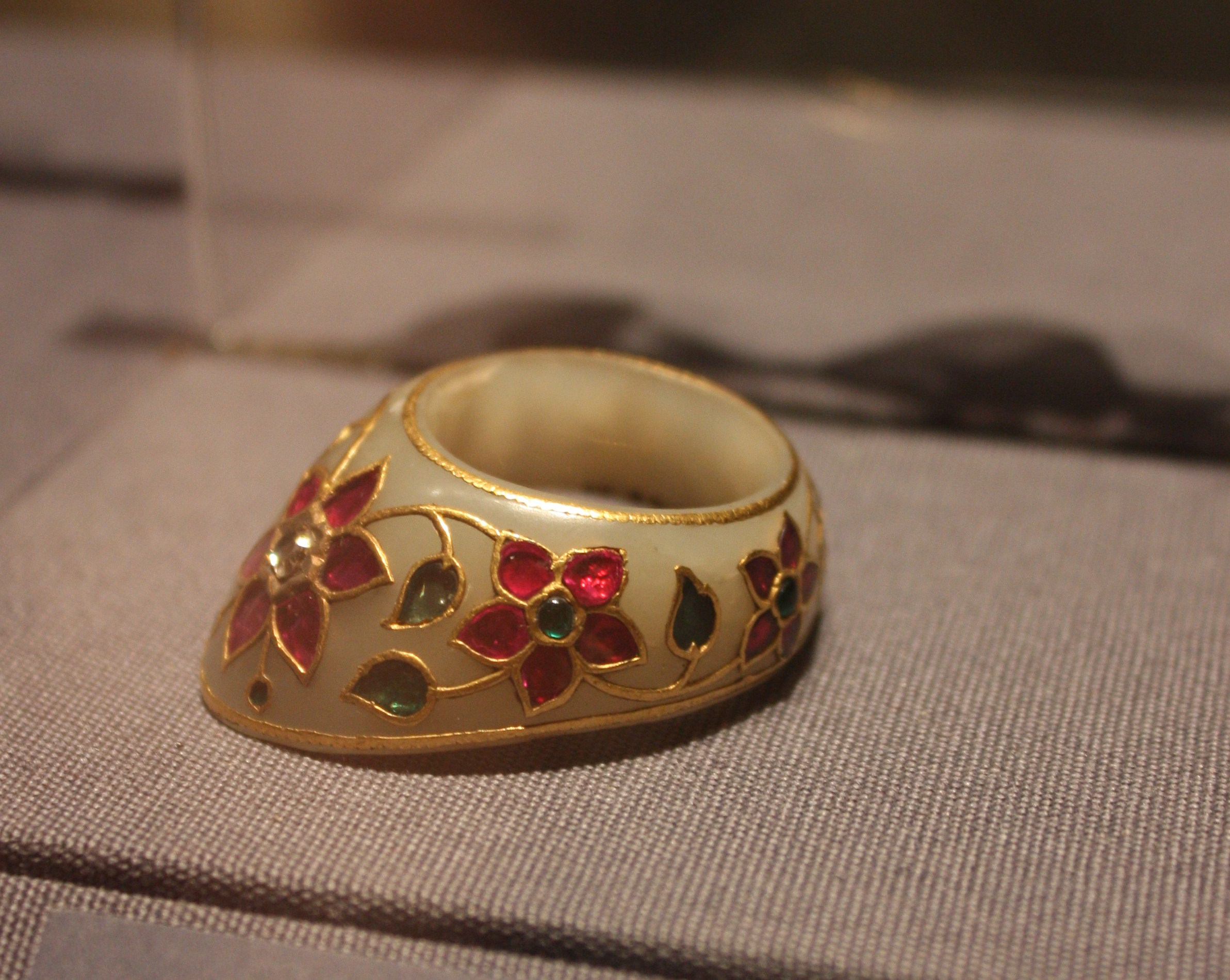
Jade thumb ring, Mughal Empire, 17th century

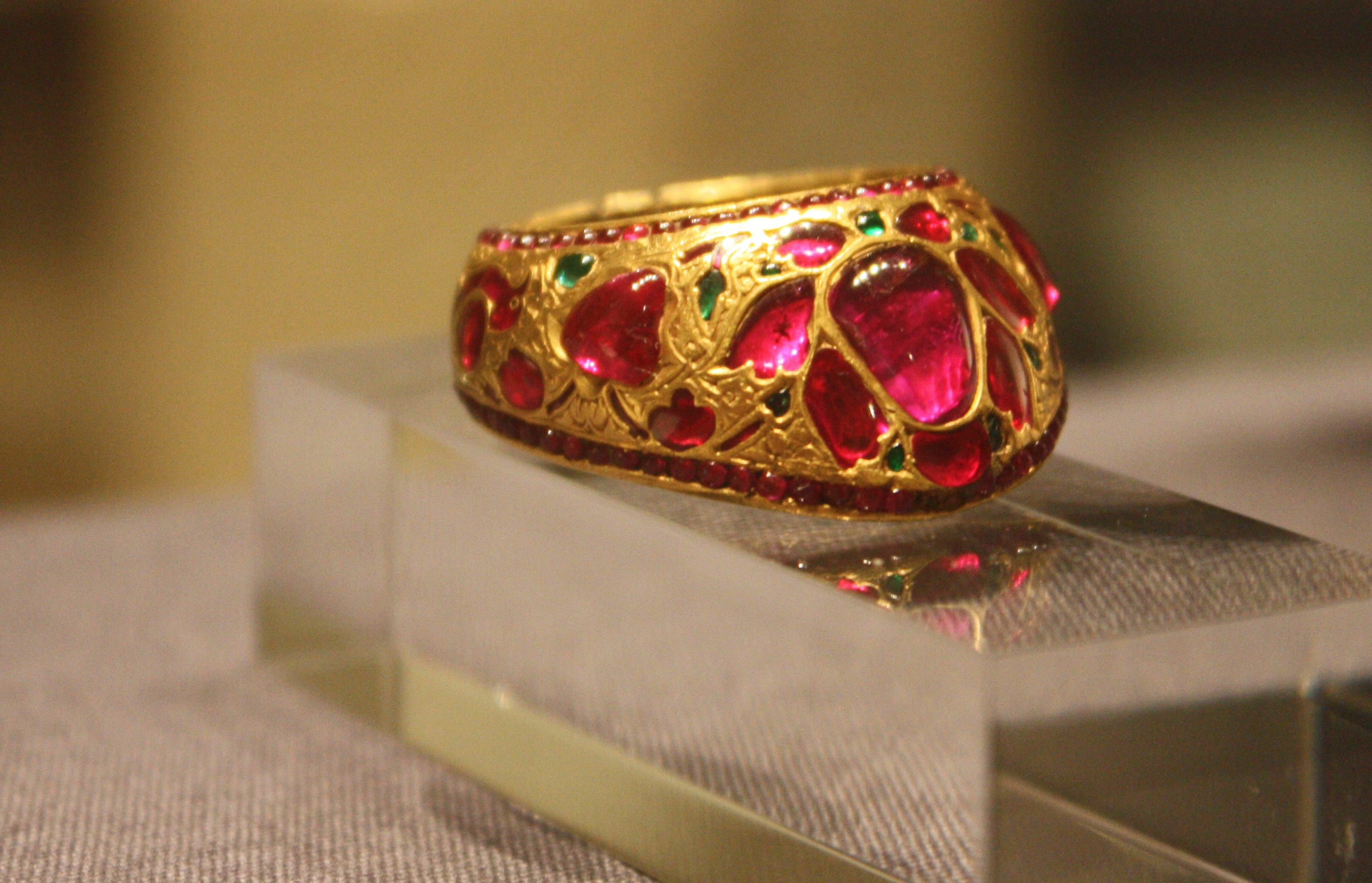
Gold thumb ring with rubies and emeralds, Mughal Empire, 17th century

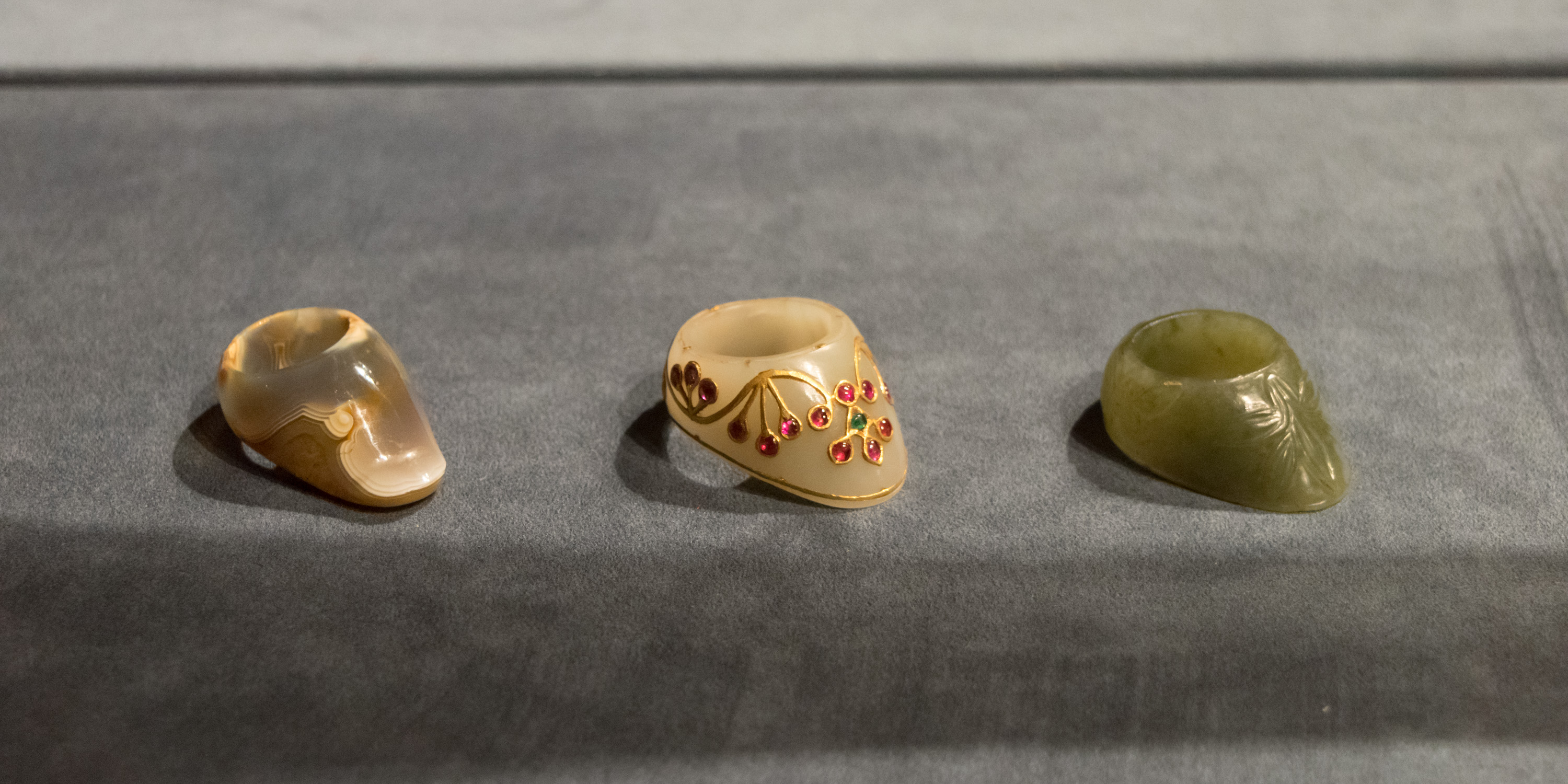
Three Indian thumb rings in agate and jade, 17th-19th century

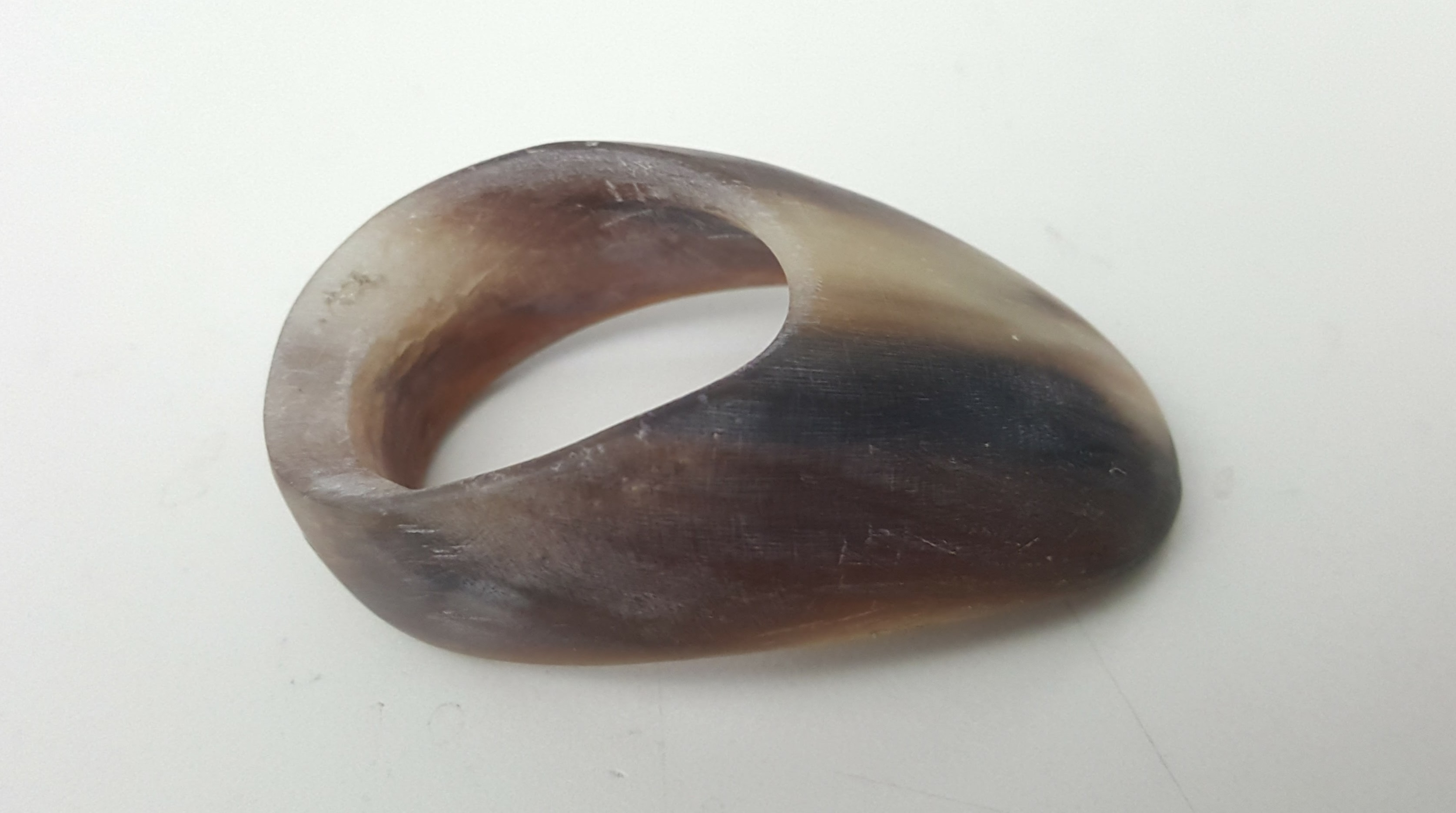
Korean thumb ring, female type

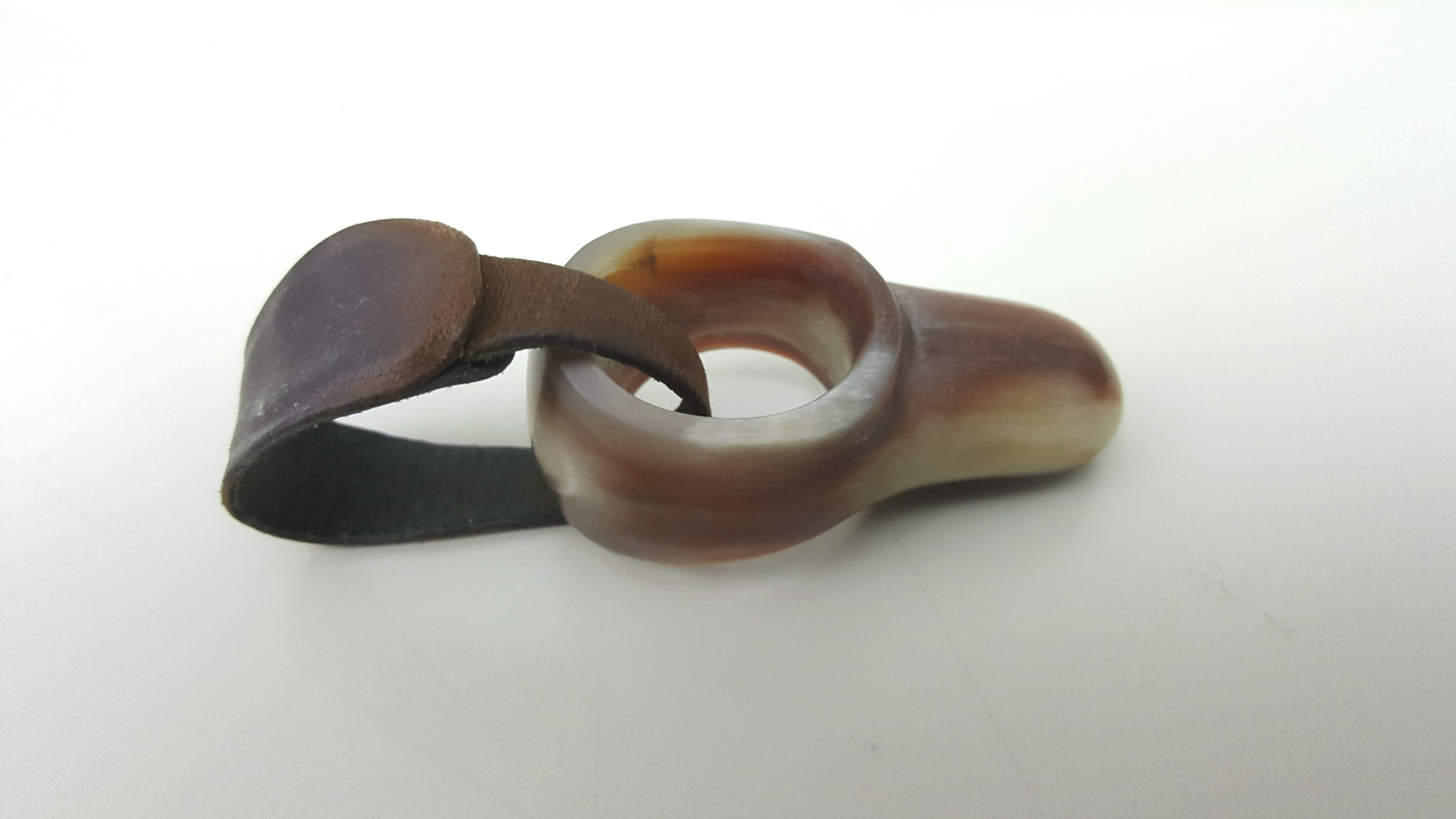
Korean thumb ring, male type

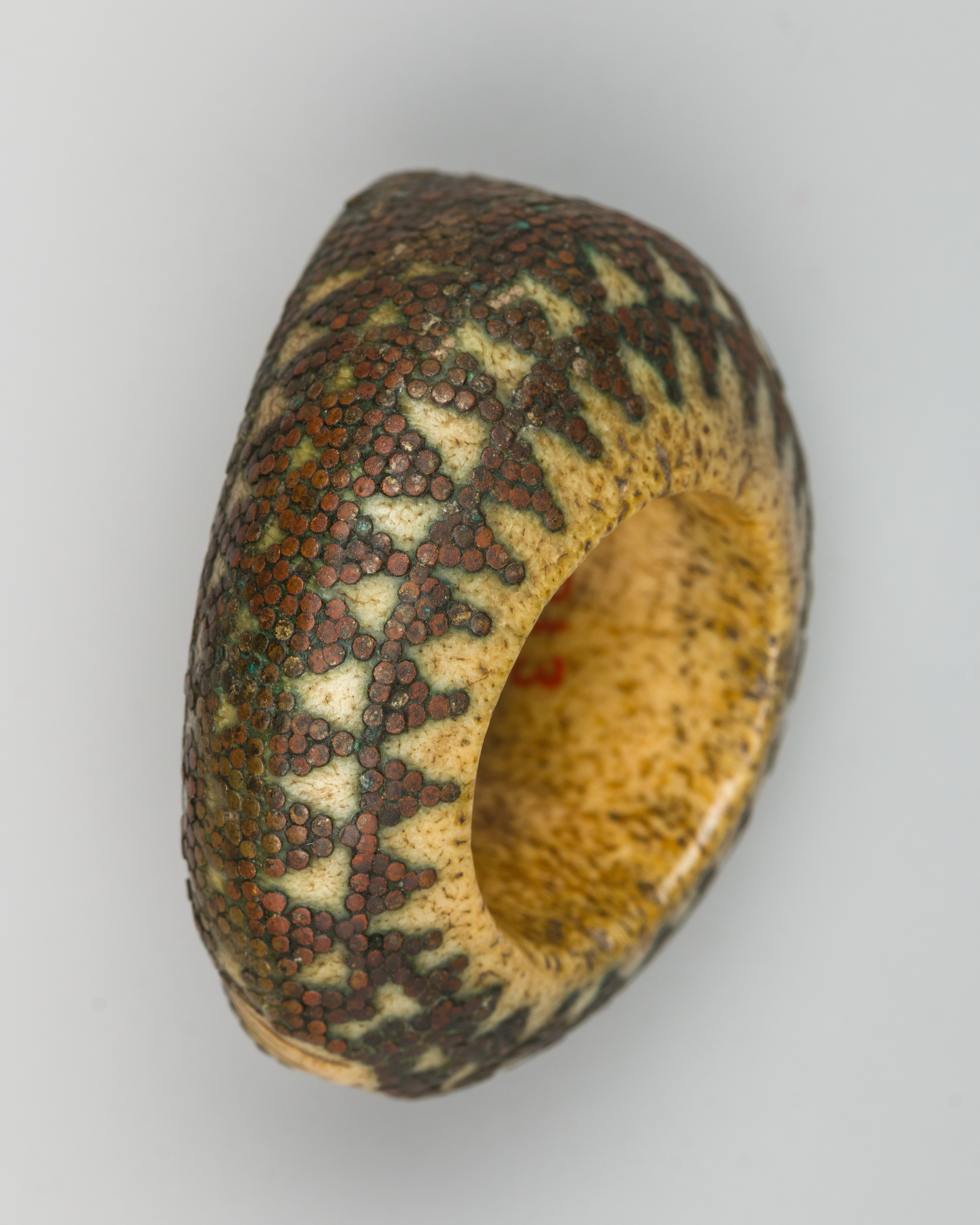
Turkish archer's ring, 18th century
