= Tabb, West Virginia =

Unincorporated community in the U.S. state of West Virginia

- Unincorporated community
- Location within West Virginia Location within the United States
- Coordinates: 39°30′50″N 77°58′04″W
- Country: United States
- State: West Virginia
- County: Berkeley
- Elevation: 525 ft (160 m)
- Time zone: UTC-5 (Eastern (EST))
  - Summer (DST): UTC-4 (EDT)
- GNIS feature ID: 1727525

Tabb was an unincorporated community in Berkeley County, West Virginia, United States.
