= John B. Tabb =

American poet (1845–1909)

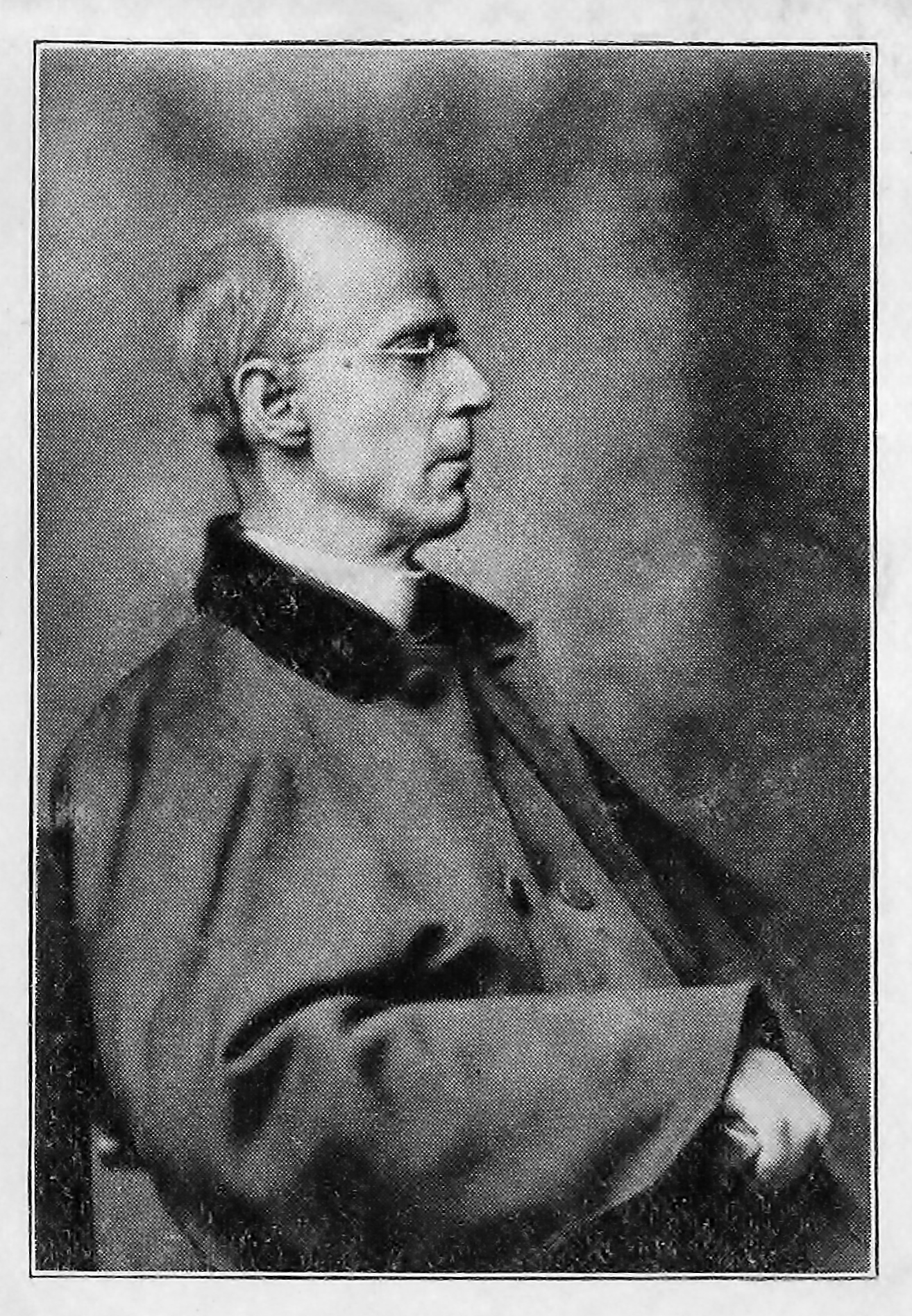
- Rev. John B. Tabb, the poet-priest
- Born: John Banister Tabb; March 22, 1845; Amelia County, Virginia, U.S.
- Died: November 19, 1909 (aged 64); Ellicott City, Maryland, U.S.
- Resting place: Hollywood Cemetery; Richmond, Virginia, U.S.
- Occupations: Priest, poet, professor
- Relatives: William Barksdale Tabb (brother)

John Banister Tabb (Note: Although often misspelled as "Bannister", the poet's middle name is spelled with a single 'n' as "Banister".) (March 22, 1845 – November 19, 1909) was an American poet, Roman Catholic priest, and professor of English.

== Early life and education ==
A member the First Families of Virginia, Tabb was born in Amelia County, Virginia, on March 22, 1845 to the former Marianne Bertrand Archer and her merchant and planter husband, John Yelverton Tabb. He was raised on a plantation known as "The Forest". The earliest of his Tabb ancestors, Humphrey Tabb, had emigrated to the Virginia colony in 1637, and the earlies of his Barksdale ancestors, William Barksdale had emigrated to the same colony circa 1660, with John Barksdale emigrating to South Carolina circa 1694/5. His paternal grandfather, John Tabb had served on Amelia County's Committee of Safety during the Revolutionary War, and in the Virginia Revolutionary Conventions, as well as represented Amelia County in the House of Burgesses before the conflict and the Virginia House of Delegates for two separate single terms. His Barksdale relatives also had records of military and public service. One elder brothers was William Barksdale Tabb, a lawyer and officer in the Confederate States Army.

== Confederate service ==
Tabb served as a clerk on the blockade runner Robert E. Lee for the Confederacy during the American Civil War. In September 1863, the Robert E. Lee took Father John B. Bannon, former Catholic chaplain of the First Missouri Brigade, to Bermuda as part of a mission to fight Unionist recruitment in Ireland. Bannon spoke with Tabb, who became interested in Catholicism. On November 9, the Union Navy captured the vessel on its way to Texas. Tabb spent eight months in a Union prison camp at Point Lookout, Maryland, where he formed a lifelong friendship with poet Sidney Lanier.

== Conversion to Catholicism, priestly and academic careers ==
Tabb converted to Roman Catholicism in 1872, and taught literature at Saint Charles College in Ellicott City, Maryland, in 1878.

Tabb was ordained as a priest in 1884, after which he retained his academic position. Plagued by eye problems his whole life, he continued to teach though he lost his sight completely about a year before his death. He died at Saint Charles College on November 19, 1909. He was buried in Hollywood Cemetery.

Father Tabb (as he was commonly known) was widely published in popular and prestigious magazines of the day, including Harper's Monthly, The Atlantic Monthly, and The Cosmopolitan. His books of poetry include Poems (1894), Lyrics (1897), Later Lyrics (1902), and, posthumously, Later Poems (1910). He also wrote one prose work, Bone Rules (1897), an English grammar; only one of his sermons has survived, a sermon on the Assumption (August 15, 1894).

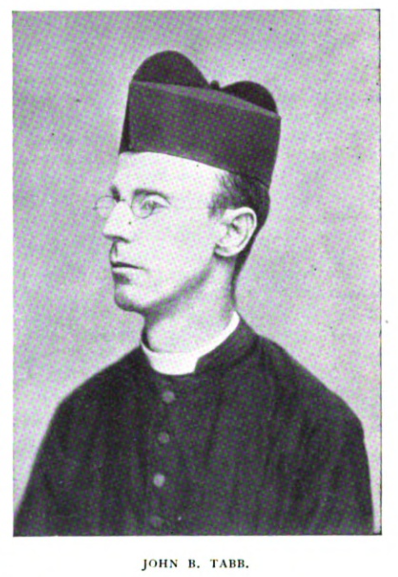
John B. Tabb in June 1895 edition of The Bookman (New York City)

English poet Alice Meynell made A Selection from the Verses of John B. Tabb (1906). His biographer, Francis A. Litz, a former student of Tabb's, published previously uncollected poems and previously unpublished poems in Father Tabb: A Study of His Life and Works (1923); Litz also edited a collected edition, The Poetry of Father Tabb (1928). A literary biography of him was published by a Catholic sister who was also a well-known writer, Mary Paulina Finn, V. H. M., who published as M. S. Pine.

== Death and legacy ==
Tabb died on November 19, 1909. The Tabb Monument in Amelia County is dedicated to his memory.

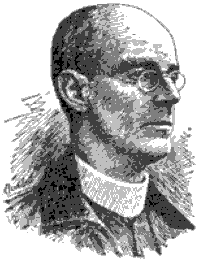
Portrait of Tabb from The National Cyclopaedia of American Biography, Volume XIII, 1906
