= Bow draw =

Method by which a bow and arrow is drawn back with the dominant hand

A bow draw in archery is the method or technique of pulling back the bowstring to store energy for the bow to shoot an arrow. The most common method in modern target archery is the Mediterranean draw, which has long been the usual method in European archery. Other methods include the pinch draw and the Mongolian or "thumb" draw. In traditional archery practice outside Western Europe the variations of the thumb draw are by far the most dominant draw types, with the Mediterranean draw restricted to the Olympic style of target archery.

== Pinch draw and release ==
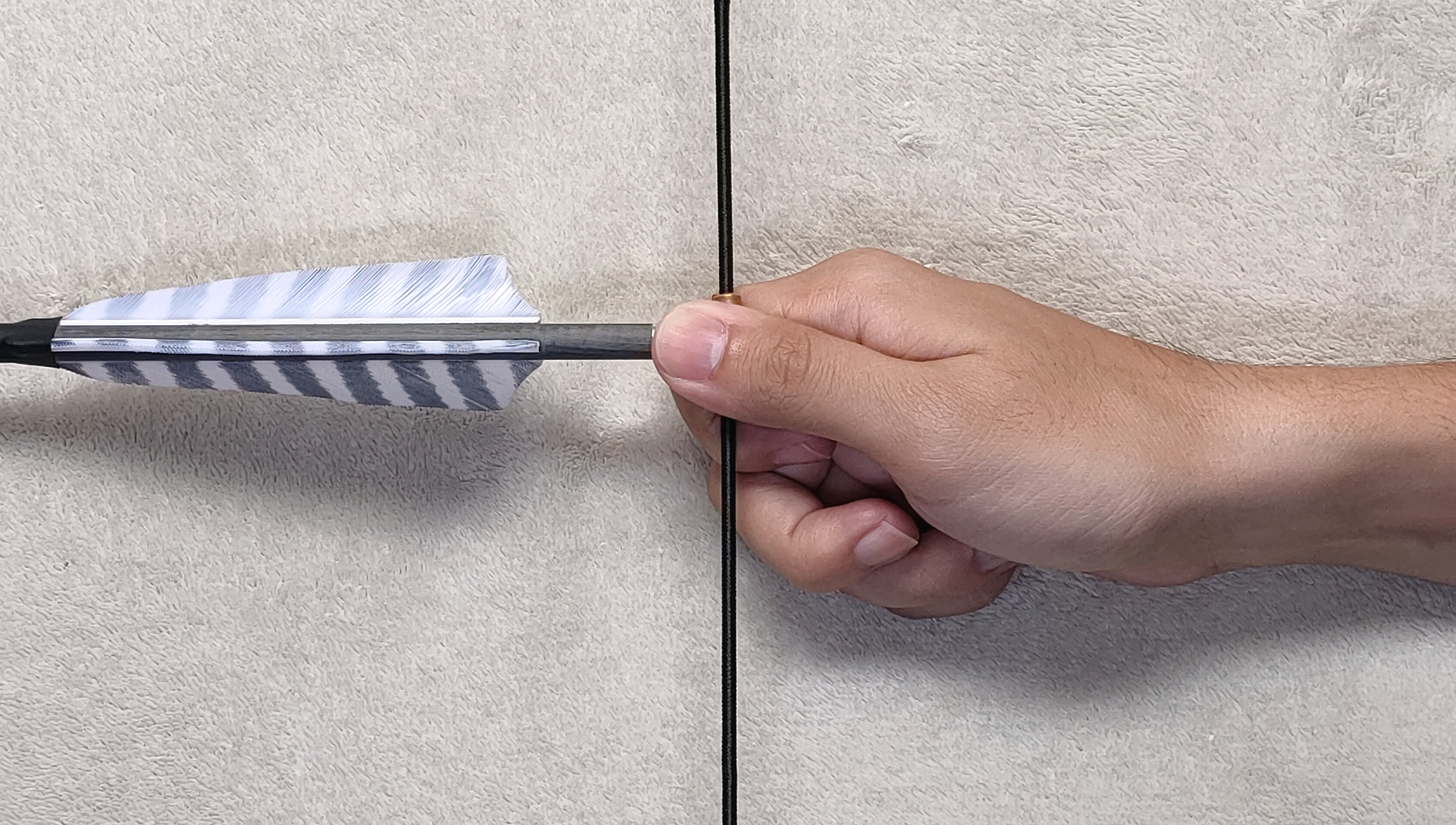
A right-handed pinch draw

The pinch draw squeezes the end of the arrow between the thumb and index finger. Most people use this draw naturally when they first start shooting. This is often called the "primary draw/release"; the advantage of this draw is that the release is very clean; when the pull reaches a certain point, friction can no longer hold the arrow and it flies free. However, this release prevents the drawing of a stiff bow unless the archer possesses enormous strength in the fingers. It is now of historical interest, but was widespread in traditional archery in the Americas and is seen (with the Mediterranean draw) in the earlier Assyrian reliefs of Ashurnasirpal II. Among Greek archers it was probably the most common draw until the end of the Classical period.

=== Variations ===
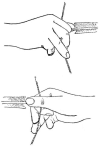
Secondary Release Pinch Draw

In the "secondary release", the forefinger and thumb pinch the arrow end as in the primary release. Additionally, the middle and ring fingers are used to hold the string; in this form it may be used by Scythian archers depicted on Greek black-figure pottery, and by an Amazon depicted about 450–400 BCE.

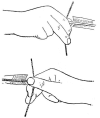
Tertiary Release Pinch Draw

This is further developed in the "tertiary release"; the forefinger not only presses on the arrow end, but also grasps the string. A Scythian is depicted using this draw about 500–450 BCE. These variants were also used in the Americas, appear on the reliefs of Sennacherib, and have been described from Thailand and the Andaman Islands.

== Mediterranean draw and release ==
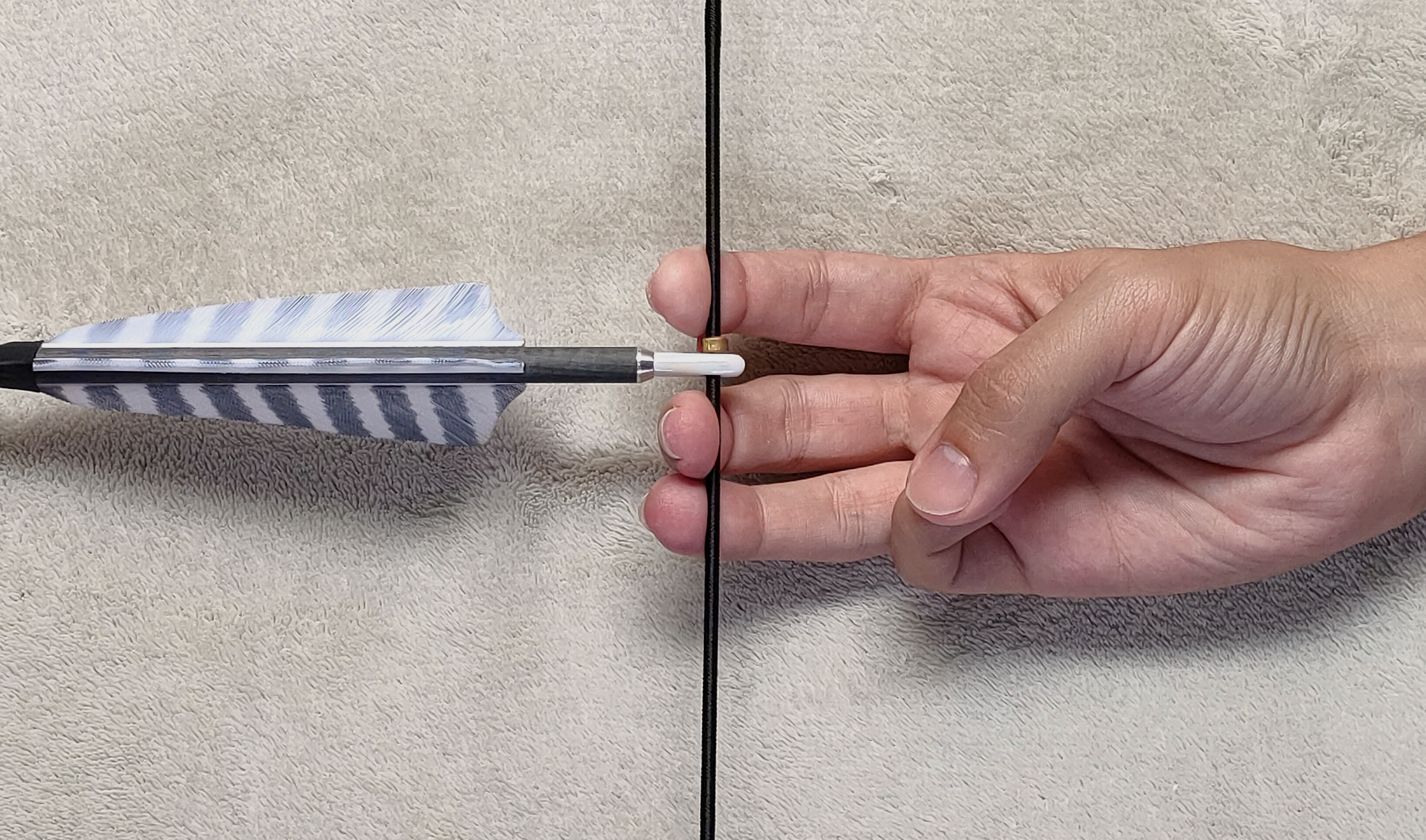
A right-handed Mediterranean draw

This is accomplished by the forefinger on the string above the arrow, and the middle and ring finger on the string below the arrow. The arrow is normally placed on the left side of the bow for right handed archers and on the right side for left handed archers. The modern thought on the draw is to keep effort in the hand at a minimum. The only work the hand has to do is the effort required to keep the bowstring on the fingers. The wrist is to be either straight or flexed away from the archer. This allows for the least tension in the hand, and thus a faster relaxation of the hand at release. This generally results in a more accurate and consistent shot. The nock of the arrow is held on the bowstring between the forefinger and middle finger to help stabilize the arrow before loosing.

The Mediterranean draw and its variants are the main traditional form in Europe; it is also native to the Middle East, appearing on Assyrian carvings at all periods. The Hadza, who do not use quivers, may hold other arrows with the free thumb and little finger.

=== Variations ===
There are variations of this that include the use of only two fingers, sometimes referred to as being the "Flemish" release. This may allow for a cleaner release. However, more pressure is put on the two fingers, resulting in more strain. Currently, this draw method is little used in Western archery but widespread in Eastern European archery where it is often referred to as the "Hungarian draw". It is common in Hungarian archery, and is taught by several prominent modern teachers of traditional horse and foot archery techniques. The two-finger release can be used on either side of the bow, but is primarily used with a left hand side nocking position bow for mounted and foot use.

The two-finger draw in its Hungarian form can be found in historical records into antiquity amongst Scythian archery and through into the Middle Ages in eastern European manuscripts and art.

Barebow and longbow archers often have the index, middle and ring fingers on the string all below the arrow, a method referred to as "three under". This brings the arrow closer to the eye, facilitating "point of aim" and instinctive shooting, and allows the archer to use the "string walking" aiming technique.

An Asiatic variation of this draw, the "long Sassanid draw" (although the Sassanid main draw type was the thumb draw ) uses only the middle and ring fingers on the string underneath the arrow using a specialised finger tab, with the index finger used to stabilise the arrow during the draw but not touching the string.

== Thumb draw and release ==
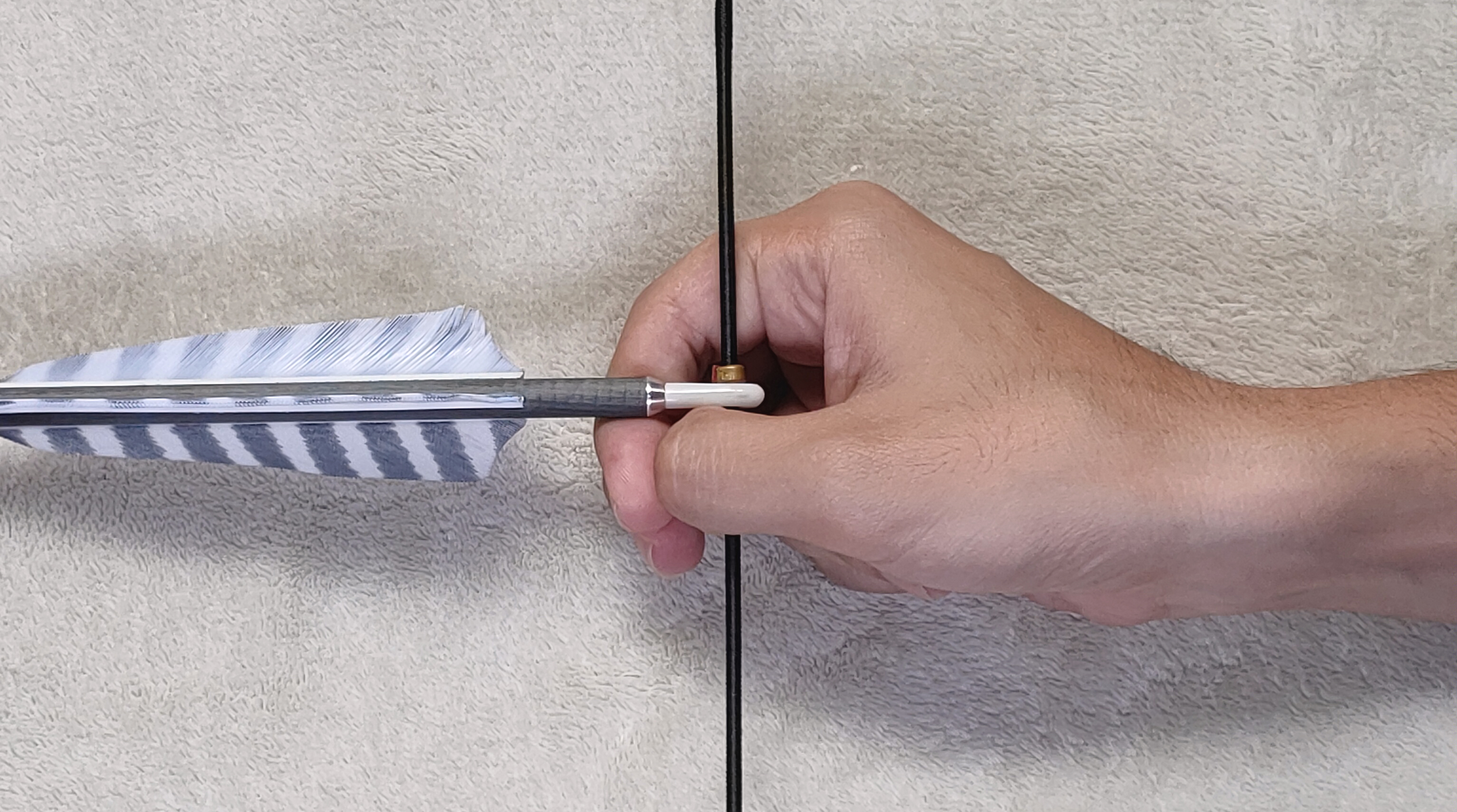
A right-handed thumb draw

The thumb draw uses only the thumb, the strongest single digit, to grasp the string. The index and/or middle fingers close over the outside of the thumb to reinforce the grip. This is often called the "Mongolian draw/release", but it is traditional for all ethnicities across the Asian steppes, extending to Korea, China, Russia, Persia and Turkey. It is typically used with a thumb ring for protection of the thumb pad and joints. It was also used by Ishi, the last of the Yahi, with his short bows. This draw was also used by the Romans and Byzantines, and it is mentioned in Byzantine manuals.

It gives a narrower grip on the string, as only one digit is used, and this may help to avoid "string pinch" with shorter bows such as the composite bows normally used from horseback. Additionally, the pressure exerted on the arrow from the index finger holds the arrow to the right side of the bow (for right handed shooters). This is especially useful for mounted archers as the bouncing from the horse would otherwise cause the arrow to flop around. It may also avoid a problem occasionally faced by archers using the Mediterranean release, when the three fingers do not release at exactly the same time and thus foul the draw. It also positions the string further back in the hand, allowing a longer draw, all else being equal. This release is normally used with the arrow on the right side of the bow for a right-handed archer, and on the left side of the bow for a left-handed archer.

== Japanese draw and release ==
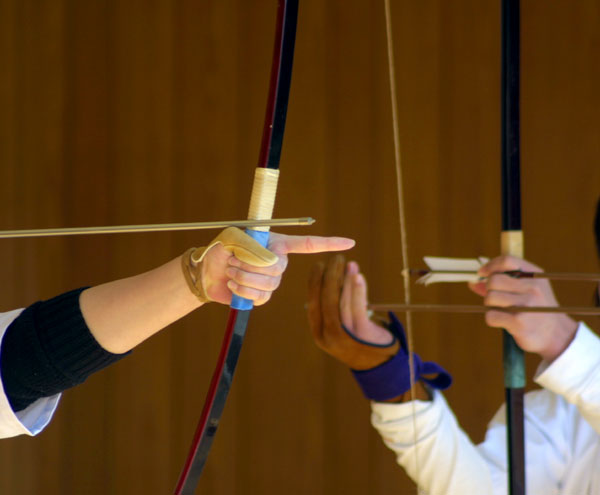
An oshidegake on the bow arm of a kyūdōka

Traditional Japanese archery uses a unique type of thumb draw called torikake. It employs a three or four-fingered leather glove with a grooved piece of horn sewn into the crouch of the thumb. The draw starts with the thumb wrapping around the string just below the nocking point so the string seats in the horn groove. Then the index finger, middle finger and (in some styles) ring finger bend down and squeeze the string against the thumb groove. The Japanese draw tends to be very long compared to Western styles, pulling several inches past the archer's ear.

== Equipment ==
Protective equipment is normally used to protect the skin of the digits used. For the Mediterranean draw, the fingers may be protected with shooting gloves or by finger tabs. A shooting glove is a three-fingered glove that goes on the primary hand of the shooter. Models range from full-finger leather to gloves that only cover the tips of the fingers. These gloves are used mostly by traditional and bare-bow shooters. Finger tabs are pieces of material that are attached via leather straps or holes to the middle finger. For amateurs a plain tab made of leather is a simple, cheap, and still highly effective protection for the fingers.

Thumb rings or leather thumb tabs are used by archers practising the thumb release. Most cover and protect the skin of the thumb only. The Japanese yugake is a reinforced glove with a special ridge which holds the string.

Since the 1980s, with the advent of the compound bow, mechanical releases have become popular. The mechanism is usually attached to the wrist; it can hold the string, but more often holds the "D-loop", a piece of string material (or sometimes a metal bracket) attached to the string above and below the nocking point. When triggered, the mechanism releases the string or D-loop, in turn releasing the arrow. They offer a cleaner release and require no finger strength. However, finger releases must be used for bows other than compounds in most tournaments (including World Archery) and thus are still widely used.

Mechanical releases factor out any kind of finger strength, allowing for a stronger pull as the weakest point in drawing back a bow is the fingers. Some drawbacks to these devices are the need for consistent equipment (any change in equipment can lead to slight deviation and require the archer to take a period to adjust their shot) and the slight decrease in draw length.

Bow slings or wrist slings are used to allow the archer to resist the bow instead of actively holding it. If also using a stabilizer it should force the bow to fall forward as the sling catches it. This form is dominant in Olympic Style archery and proper form for Mediterranean release of a recurve bow.

Other releases include:

- African shooting-cross of the Tengelin
- Gemini ring (Roman)
- Shooting-tablet / Czech bow puller

== General references ==
Ancient and modern methods of arrow-release. Edward S. Morse, Director, Peabody Academy of Science. Bulletin of the Essex Institute vol. XVII Oct-Dec 1885. Reprinted 2002 by the Dyfi Valley Bookshop.
