= Finger tab =

Archery equipment

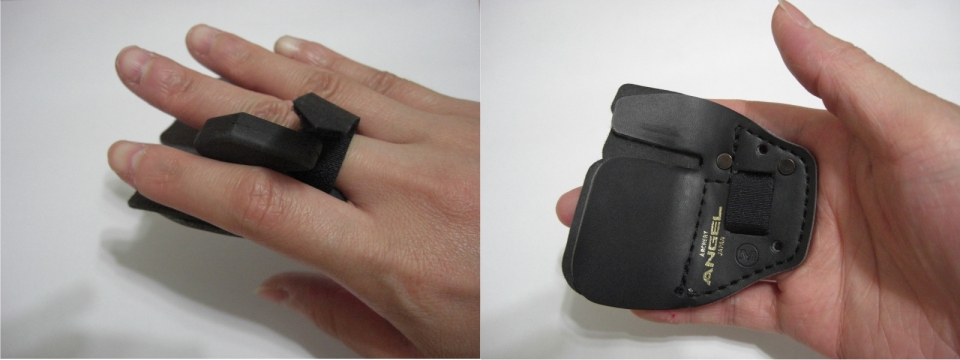
A tab worn on the right hand.

A crude finger tab of the split type.

In archery, a finger tab or archer tab is a small leather or synthetic patch that protects an archer's fingers from the bowstring. It is strapped or otherwise attached to an archer's hand. In summertime, tabs are far more comfortable than gloves and can more conveniently use thicker material. They are also less expensive and easier to fit, and are the normal finger-protection used with recurve bows.

The tab usually has a retaining loop on the back of the tab that fits over the middle finger, which is simply there to keep the tab on the fingers when the string is loosed. Tabs come in various forms. The simplest is made of a single patch that is placed below the nocking point between the fingers and the string. This style of shooting is called 'three finger under'. These are most often used in barebow styles of archery.

More complex tabs have a split about one third down the leading edge so that the fingers can be placed with one finger above and two fingers below the nocking point of the arrow. This style of shooting is called split finger or Mediterranean draw. The tab may also have a platform that is attached to the back of the tab and forms a flat cover over the top, to give the archer a hard reference point underneath the chin when the string is drawn back. Platform tabs are more common for recurve or Olympic-class target archery.

A thumb ring or thumb tab is used similarly to protect the thumb by archers practising the Mongolian draw. The Japanese yugake is a reinforced glove with a special ridge which holds the string.

In the past 25 years mechanical releases have become popular. The mechanism is usually attached to the wrist; it holds the string, and releases it when triggered. These are usually used with compound bows.

The term "tab" is of uncertain etymology, perhaps an alteration of tag (small hanging piece).

== See also ==
- Bow draw
- Bracer
