= William Barksdale Tabb =

American military figure (1840–1874)

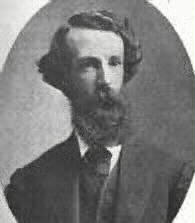

Personal details
- Born: September 11, 1840 Amelia County, Virginia, United States
- Died: December 4, 1874 (aged 34) Amelia County, Virginia, United States
- Spouse(s): Emily Sherrard Rutherfoord (m. 1864; d. 1868); Martha Cocke Masters (m. 1872; d. 1923)
- Children: 4
- Relatives: John B. Tabb (brother)

Military service
- Allegiance: Confederate States of America
- Branch/service: Confederate States Army
- Years of service: 1862–1865
- Rank: Colonel
- Commands: 28th Virginia Infantry Battalion; 59th Virginia Infantry
- Battles/wars: American Civil War

William Barksdale Tabb (September 11, 1840 – December 4, 1874) was an American lawyer and military officer in the Confederate States Army.

== Biography ==
Tabb graduated from both Virginia Military Institute (VMI) and the University of Virginia, and thereafter practiced law. During the Civil War, Tabb first served as a captain on the staff of General Henry A. Wise. On November 1, 1862, Tabb was promoted to colonel of the 59th Virginia Infantry. He was the commander of his regiment and is mainly known for being in the Battle of Sayler's Creek in which the Confederate States sustained over 7,000 casualties.

On May 9, 1873, Tabb served as a second in a duel in Richmond, Virginia, involving pistols, during which both principals—John B. Mordecai and W. Page McCarthy—were injured. The two principals and four seconds, one being Tabb, were subsequently arrested. After Mordecai died, McCarthy was charged with murder, with each of the seconds considered an accessory before the fact. Tabb and the other seconds spent several days in jail before a judge ruled they could be freed on bail. In January 1874, McCarthy was convicted of involuntary manslaughter, and charges against the seconds were dismissed. The following month, Governor James L. Kemper granted McCarthy executive clemency.

== Family ==
Tabb was the second of four children born to Thomas Yelverton Tabb (1809–1877) and Marianna Elizabeth Bertrand Archer (1814–1875). One of his brothers was John B. Tabb, a poet and priest.

Tabb first married in 1864—he had three children with his first wife: Harriet Rutherford Tabb, William Barksdale Tabb Jr., and Sherrard Rutherford Tabb. After the death of his first wife in 1868, Tabb remarried in 1872—with his second wife, Pattie Cocke Masters, he had a daughter, Jennie Masters Tabb.
