= Tabby (disambiguation) =

A tabby cat is a cat with a distinctive coat and informally to refer to any domestic cat, particularly a female one.

Other common uses:

- Tabby concrete, a building material
- Tabby weave, a fundamental textile pattern

Tabby may also refer to:

== People ==
- nickname of Frank Booth (English footballer) (1882–1919)
- nickname of Tabetha S. Boyajian (born c. 1980), American astronomer
- Tabby Callaghan (born 1981), Irish musician
- Tabby Wynyard (1867–1938), New Zealand rugby union footballer
- Tabby-To-Kwanah or Tabby (1789–1898), leader of Timpanogos Native American tribe

== Fictional characters ==
- A character in the .hack//Roots anime series
- A character in Monster Warriors
- Tabby, a Disney character in the Donald Duck universe
- Tabby Maxwell-Brown, a character in the British soap opera Hollyoaks in 2016 and 2017

== Other uses ==
- Tabby's Star, a star noted for unusual dimming events
- Showa/Nakajima L2D, Japanese license-built versions of the Douglas DC-3 transport aircraft given the Allied code name Tabby during World War II
- Tabby concrete, a building material
- OSVehicle Tabby, an open source vehicle design
- Tabby weave, a fundamental textile pattern
- Tabernacle (concert hall), a concert venue in Atlanta
- Pseudergolis wedah or Tabby, a butterfly species
- Tabby the tiger, mascot of Marietta High School (Ohio)

== See also ==
- Hamilton Tiger-Cats, a Canadian Football League team nicknamed the "Tabbies"
- Tabby Tabby Island, Queensland, Australia - see List of reduplicated Australian place names
