= John Pearson =

John Pearson may refer to:

== Architects ==
- John Loughborough Pearson (1817–1897), British architect
- John A. Pearson (1867–1940), Canadian architect

== Military ==
- John Pearson (VC) (1825–1892), recipient of the Victoria Cross
- John Andrew Pearson (Royal Navy officer), officer in the Royal Navy during the Second World War
- John William Pearson (1808–1864), captain in the Confederate Army during the American Civil War

== Politicians ==
- John Pearson (politician) (1802–1875), American judge and politician
- John James Pearson (1800–1888), United States Congressman from Pennsylvania
- John L. Pearson (politician) (1926–2021), Mississippi state representative
- John Mills Pearson (1832–1910), American politician and Mason

== Sports ==
=== Association football ===
- John Pearson (footballer, born 1868) (1868–1931), English football player and referee
- John Pearson (footballer, born 1892) (1892–1937), Scottish football player
- John Pearson (footballer, born 1896) (1896–1979), English football player
- John Pearson (footballer, born 1935), English football player
- John Pearson (footballer, born 1946), English football player
- John Pearson (footballer, born 1963), English football player

=== Other sports ===
- John Pearson (cricketer) (1915–2007), English cricketer
- John Pearson (curler) (active 1959), Scottish curler
- John Pearson (gymnast) (1902–1984), American gymnast
- John Pearson (sport shooter) (1926–1994), British Olympic shooter
- John Pearson, 3rd Viscount Cowdray (1910–1995), British peer, businessman and polo player

== Others ==
- Norman Pearson (priest) (John Norman Pearson, 1787–1865), English divine
- John Pearson (artist) (fl. 1885–1910), English master-craftsman
- John Pearson (author) (1930–2021), British author
- John Pearson (bishop) (1613–1686), English theologian, scholar, and Bishop of Chester
- John Pearson (model) (born 1965), British supermodel and entrepreneur
- John Pearson (judge) (1820–1886), British High Court justice and son of John Norman Pearson
- John Pearson (surgeon) (1758–1826), British surgeon
- John Pearson (advocate general) (1771–1841), Advocate General in British India
- John Richard Anthony Pearson (born 1930), British chemical engineer
- John Thomas Pearson (1801–1851), British surgeon
- Johnny Pearson (1925–2011), British composer
- John Pearson (diplomat), British ambassador to Laos 2019–2023

== See also ==
- Johnny Peirson (1925–2021), Canadian ice hockey player
- John Pierson (disambiguation)
