= Pre-Marx socialists =

List of socialism advocates before Marx and Engels

While Marxism had a significant impact on socialist thought, pre-Marxist thinkers (before Marx wrote on the subject) have advocated socialism in forms both similar and in stark contrast to Karl Marx and Friedrich Engels' conception of socialism, advocating some form of collective ownership over large-scale production, worker-management within the workplace, or in some cases a form of planned economy.

== List ==
Early socialist and proto-socialist philosophers and political theorists:

1. Gaius and Tiberius Gracchus, ancient Roman statesmen who advocated heavily for policies in the interest of the Plebeians. These policies included land and wealth redistribution and subsidized grain to help the poor.
2. Gerrard Winstanley, who founded the Diggers movement in the United Kingdom
3. François-Noël Babeuf, French revolutionary and journalist
4. Charles Fourier, French philosopher who propounded principles very similar to that of Marx
5. Louis Blanqui, French socialist and writer
6. Marcus Thrane, Norwegian socialist
7. Jean-Jacques Rousseau, Genevan philosopher, writer and composer whose works influenced the French Revolution
8. Pierre-Joseph Proudhon, French politician and philosopher
9. Pierre Leroux, French religious socialist

Ricardian socialist economists:

1. Thomas Hodgskin, English Ricardian socialist and free-market anarchist
2. Charles Hall
3. John Francis Bray
4. John Gray
5. William Thompson
6. Percy Ravenstone
7. James Mill
8. John Stuart Mill, classical political economist who came to advocate worker-cooperative socialism

Utopian socialist thinkers:

1. Sylvain Maréchal
2. Claude Henri de Saint-Simon
3. Wilhelm Weitling
4. Robert Owen
5. Étienne Cabet
6. Frances Wright

Some socialist values can also be found in Christian ethics. For example, on topics like wealth, inequality, poverty, and usury. At least since the 12th century, socialist ideas found expression in many documented political movements within the Christian culture (see Christian socialism, Christian communism). Similar more recent tendencies in the Christian culture include Christian democracy and Liberation theology.

== See also ==
- Classical economics
- History of communism
- History of socialism
- Pre-Marxist communism
- Ricardian socialism
- Socialism
- Structural fix
- Utopian socialism
- Voluntaryism
- Yellow socialism
- Christian ethics
- Christian socialism
- Christian communism
- Christian democracy
- Liberation theology
