= Puller =

Puller may refer to:

== Fish ==
- Several species in the genus Chromis
- One-spot puller or brown puller, Atypichthys latus
- Reticulated puller, Dascyllus reticulatus
- Spiny-tail puller, Acanthochromis polyacanthus
- White-spot puller, Dascyllus trimaculatus

== People ==
- Richard Puller (1747–1826), English merchant banker
- Sir Christopher Puller (1774 – 26 May 1824), English lawyer; briefly Chief Justice of Bengal; son of Richard
- Chesty Puller, a United States Marine Corps officer during World War II and the Korean War, and the most decorated Marine in the history of the Corps
- Lewis Puller, son of Chesty Puller, who was maimed during the Vietnam War and took his own life due to complications from his injuries two and a half decades later

== Other ==
- Puller (band), an American rock band on Tooth and Nail Records during the 1990s

== See also ==
- Pulling (disambiguation)
