= To each according to his contribution =

Socialist principle of distribution

"To each according to his contribution" is a principle of distribution considered to be one of the defining features of socialism. It refers to an arrangement whereby individual compensation is representative of one's contribution to the social product (total output of the economy) in terms of effort, labor and productivity. This is in contrast to the method of distribution and compensation in capitalism, an economic and political system in which property owners can receive income by virtue of ownership irrespective of their contribution to the social product.

The concept formed the basic definition of socialism for its pre-Marxist proponents, including Ricardian socialists, classical economists, collectivist anarchists and individualist anarchists, as well as for Marx, who contrasted it with "to each according to his need" as the corresponding principle of completed communism.

== Definition and purpose ==
To each according to his contribution was a concept espoused by many members of the socialist and labor movement. The French socialist Saint-Simonists of the 1820s and 1830s used slogans such as, "from each according to his ability, to each ability according to its work" or, "From each according to his capacity, to each according to his works.” Other examples of this can be found from Ferdinand Lassalle's and Eugen Dühring's statements to Leon Trotsky's writings. Vladimir Lenin, inspired by Marx's writing on the subject in his Critique of the Gotha Programme, claimed the principle to be a fundamental element of socialism within Marxist theory.

Libertarian socialist thinkers, such as American anarchist Benjamin Tucker, defined socialism as a system whereby the laborer receives the full product of his labor through the elimination of exploitation and accrual of unearned income to a capitalist class.

The term means simply that each worker in a socialist society receives compensation and benefits according to the quantity and value of the labor that they contributed. This translates into workers of great productivity receiving more wages and benefits than workers of average productivity, and substantially more than workers of lesser productivity. An extension of this principle could also be made so that the more difficult one's job is – whether this difficulty is derived from greater training requirements, job intensity, safety hazards, etc. – the more one is rewarded for the labor contributed. The purpose of the principle, as Trotsky would later state, is to promote productivity. This is done by creating incentives to work harder, longer, and more productively. The principle is ultimately a stowaway from capitalism that, according to Marx, will vanish as work becomes more automated and enjoyable, and goods become available in abundance.

== Elaboration by Marx ==
Capitalism can lead to a situation where the means of production are owned by a small minority who do not produce, but rather live off the labor of others. Socialism is said to remedy this by putting the means of production in common hands and rewarding individuals according to their contributions.

In the Critique of the Gotha Programme, while criticizing Ferdinand Lassalle's ideas, Marx elaborates on the theory. According to Marx's analysis of the Programme, Lassalle suggests that "the proceeds of labor belong undiminished with equal right to all members of society". While agreeing that the citizens of a workers' society should be rewarded according to individual contributions, Marx claims that giving them the "full product" of their labor is impossible as some of the proceeds will be needed to maintain infrastructure and so forth. He then explains the nature of a communist society in its transition phase (socialist society), which does not emerge from its own foundations "but, on the contrary, .. from capitalist society; [and] thus in every respect, economically, morally, and intellectually, still stamped with the birthmarks of the old society from whose womb it emerges". And so, "accordingly, the individual producer receives back from society – after the deductions have been made – exactly what he gives to it". He explains this as:

What he has given to it is his individual quantum of labor. For example, the social working day consists of the sum of the individual hours of work; the individual labor time of the individual producer is the part of the social working day contributed by him, his share in it. He receives a certificate from society that he has furnished such-and-such an amount of labor (after deducting his labor for the common funds); and with this certificate, he draws from the social stock of means of consumption as much as the same amount of labor cost. The same amount of labor which he has given to society in one form, he receives back in another.

In the paragraph immediately following, Marx continues to explain how this system of exchange is related to the capitalist system of exchange:

Here, obviously, the same principle prevails as that which regulates the exchange of commodities, as far as this is exchange of equal values. Content and form are changed, because under the altered circumstances no one can give anything except his labor, and because, on the other hand, nothing can pass to the ownership of individuals, except individual means of consumption. But as far as the distribution of the latter among the individual producers is concerned, the same principle prevails as in the exchange of commodity equivalents: a given amount of labor in one form is exchanged for an equal amount of labor in another form.

Marx says that this is rational and necessary, and that once society advances from the early phase of communist society and work becomes life's prime want, distribution will occur differently. During the completed phase of communism, the standard shall be "from each according to his ability, to each according to his needs".

== The Leninist view ==
Lenin wrote The State and Revolution to inform the public and to prevent Marxism from becoming tainted by "opportunists" and "reformists", as he called them. The work is very important as it categorizes the "first phase of communist society" as socialism, with the completed phase being communism proper. The pamphlet also answers many questions and concerns of the Marxists of his time by utilizing the classic works of Marxism.

When he is set to describe socialism and its economic features he turns to the authority of Marx, especially the Critique of the Gotha Programme. Lenin claims that socialism will not be perfect since, as Marx said, it has emerged from the womb of capitalism and which is in every respect stamped with the birthmarks of the old society. This society, socialism, will be unable to provide people with total equality, precisely because it is still marked by capitalism. He also explains the difference between the old society and the new as:

The means of production are no longer the private property of individuals. The means of production belong to the whole of society. Every member of society, performing a certain part of the socially-necessary work, receives a certificate from society to the effect that he has done a certain amount of work. And with this certificate he receives from the public store of consumer goods a corresponding quantity of products. After a deduction is made of the amount of labor which goes to the public fund, every worker, therefore, receives from society as much as he has given to it.

Lenin states that such a society is indeed socialism as it realizes the two principles of socialism "he who does not work, neither shall he eat" and "an equal amount of products for an equal amount of labor".

Joseph Stalin and Leon Trotsky both mentioned the term in their works.

- Stalin's most famous use of the concept is in his 1936 Soviet Constitution. He writes that "The principle applied in the U.S.S.R. is that of socialism: From each according to his ability, to each according to his work."
- Trotsky's mention is in his famous The Revolution Betrayed. He says that "Capitalism prepared the conditions and forces for a social revolution: technique, science and the proletariat. The communist structure cannot, however, immediately replace the bourgeois society. The material and cultural inheritance from the past is wholly inadequate for that." He goes on to defend his position by saying that "in its first steps the workers’ state cannot yet permit everyone to work "according to his abilities" – that is, as much as he can and wishes to – nor can it reward everyone "according to his needs", regardless of the work he does." And he presents the principle as the method that socialism will use by saying: "In order to increase the productive forces, it is necessary to resort to the customary norms of wage payment – that is, to the distribution of life's goods in proportion to the quantity and quality of individual labor."

== See also ==
- Collectivist anarchism – Revolutionary anarchist doctrine
- Equality of opportunity – State of fairness in which individuals are all treated the same (with justified exceptions)
- From each according to his ability, to each according to his need – Slogan popularised by Karl Marx
- He who does not work, neither shall he eat – New Testament aphorism
- Income distribution – How a country's total GDP is distributed amongst its population
- Intellectual property – Ownership of creative expressions and processes
- Jedem das Seine – German language idiom
- Knowledge worker – Worker whose main capital is knowledge
- Labour voucher – Proposed alternative to money
- Leninism – Political theory developed by Vladimir Lenin
- Marginal product of labor – Change in output that results from employing an added unit of labor
- Parasitism (social offense) – Crime of living at the expense of others
- Pre-Marx socialists – List of socialism advocates before Marx and Engels
- Socialism – Political philosophy emphasising social ownership of production
- Unearned income – Income gained through ownership of land and other monopoly
