= Norman Pearson =

Norman Pearson may refer to:

- Norman Pearson (tubist), American orchestral tuba player
- Norman Pearson (priest) (1787–1865), English priest and theologian
- Norman Holmes Pearson (1909–1975), American academic, author, editor, critic, and archivist
