= Roundhead =

Parliament supporter in the English Civil War

Parliamentarians
- Leaders: Oliver Cromwell; Richard Cromwell; John Bradshaw; Thomas Fairfax
- Founded: 1641; 385 years ago
- Dissolved: 1678; 348 years ago
- Merged into: Whigs
- Ideology: Parliamentary supremacy Popular sovereignty Factions: Constitutional monarchism Republicanism; Universal suffrage (Levellers); Proto-socialism (Diggers)
- Religion: Protestantism

Party flag

The Parliamentarians, commonly called Roundheads by their enemies and in modern historiography, were the supporters of the Parliament of England during the English Civil War (1642–1651). They fought against King Charles I of England and his supporters, known as the Cavaliers or Royalists, who claimed rule by absolute monarchy and the principle of the divine right of kings. The goal of the Roundheads was to give to Parliament the supreme control over executive administration of England.

== Beliefs ==
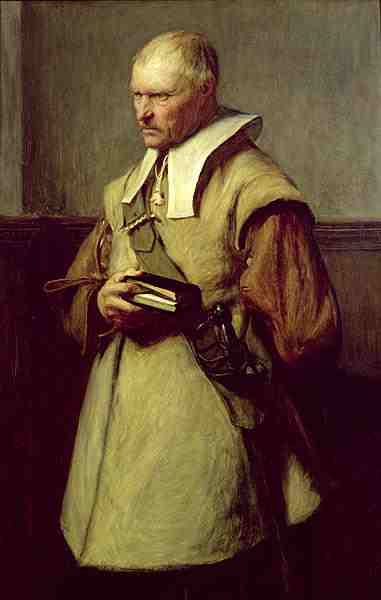
A Roundhead as depicted by John Pettie (1870)

Most Roundheads sought constitutional monarchy in place of the absolute monarchy sought by Charles; however, at the end of the English Civil War in 1649, public antipathy towards the king was high enough to allow republican leaders such as Oliver Cromwell to abolish the monarchy completely and establish the Commonwealth of England.

The Roundhead commander-in-chief of the first Civil War, Thomas Fairfax, remained a supporter of constitutional monarchy, as did many other Roundhead leaders such as Edward Montagu, 2nd Earl of Manchester, and Robert Devereux, 3rd Earl of Essex; however, this party was outmanoeuvred by the more politically adept Cromwell and his radicals, who had the backing of the New Model Army and took advantage of Charles' perceived betrayal of England in his alliance with the Scottish against Parliament.

England's many Puritans and Presbyterians were almost invariably Roundhead supporters, as were many smaller religious groups such as the Independents (although in the English territory of the Somers Isles, or Bermuda, Episcopalians and Presbyterians united as Royalists against the Independents). However, a number of Roundheads were members of the Church of England, as were most Cavaliers. Roundhead political factions included the proto-anarchist/socialist Diggers, the diverse group known as the Levellers and the apocalyptic Christian movement of the Fifth Monarchists.

== Origins and background of the term ==
Some Puritans (but by no means all of them) wore their hair closely cropped round the head or flat. This created an obvious contrast between them and the men of courtly fashion, who wore long ringlets. During the war and for a time afterwards, Roundhead was a term of derision, and in the New Model Army it was a punishable offence to call a fellow soldier a Roundhead. This contrasted with Cavalier, a word used to describe supporters of the Royalist cause, but which also started out as a pejorative term. The first proponents used it to compare members of the Royalist party with Spanish Caballeros who had abused Dutch Protestants during the reign of Elizabeth I. However, unlike Roundhead, Cavalier was later embraced by those who were the target of the epithet and used by them to describe themselves.

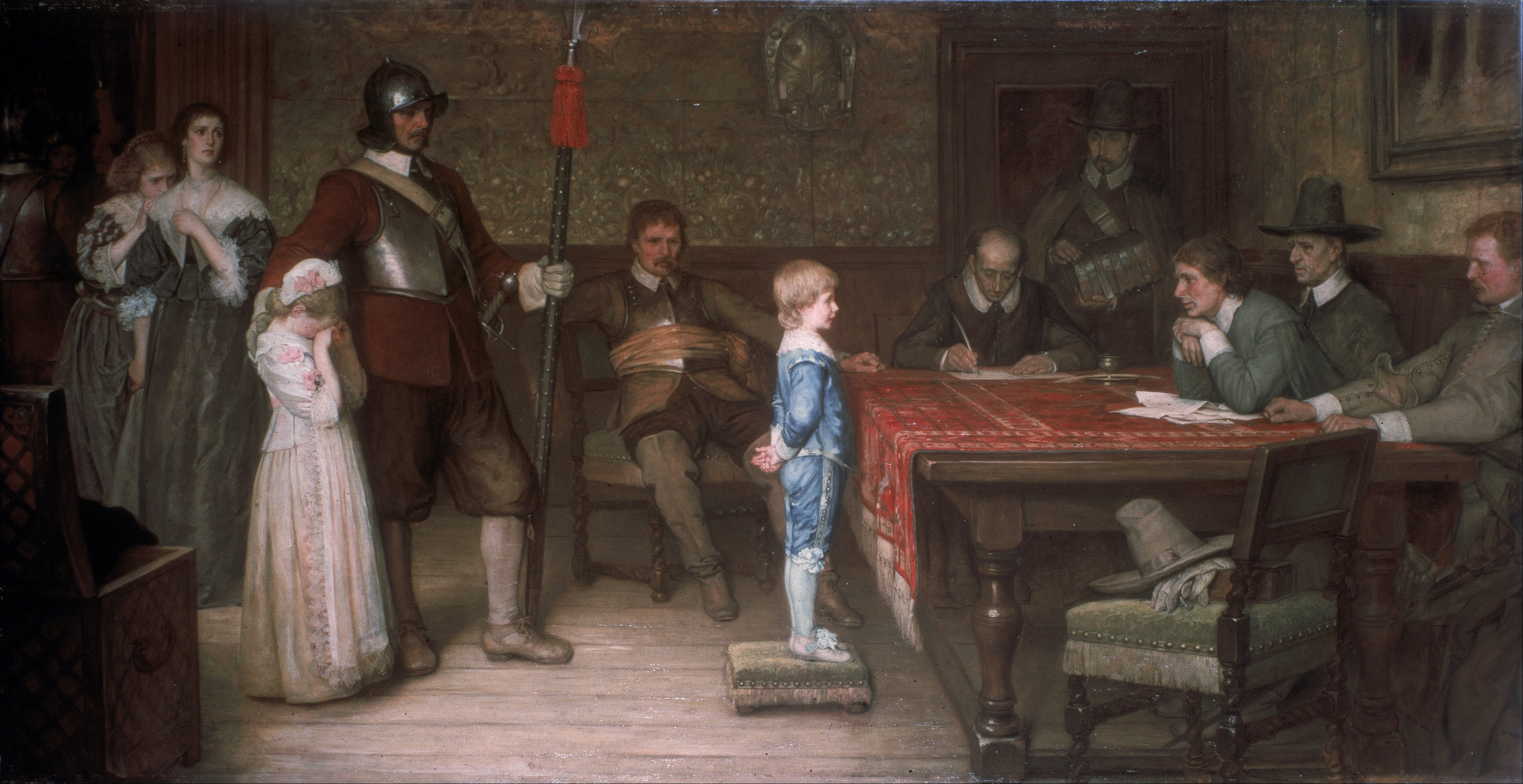
A Roundhead inquisitor asks a son of a Cavalier, "And when did you last see your father?"—William Frederick Yeames (1878)

"Roundheads" appears to have been first used as a term of derision toward the end of 1641, when the debates in Parliament in the Clergy Act 1640 were causing riots at Westminster. The Encyclopædia Britannica Eleventh Edition quotes a contemporary authority's description of the crowd that gathered there: "They had the hair of their heads very few of them longer than their ears, whereupon it came to pass that those who usually with their cries attended at Westminster were by a nickname called Roundheads". The demonstrators included London apprentices, for whom Roundhead was a term of derision, because the regulations which they had agreed to included a provision for closely cropped hair.

According to John Rushworth, the word was first used on 27 December 1641 by a disbanded officer named David Hide. During a riot, Hide is reported to have drawn his sword and said he would "cut the throat of those round-headed dogs that bawled against bishops"; however, Richard Baxter ascribes the origin of the term to a remark made by Queen Henrietta Maria, the wife of Charles I, at the trial of Thomas Wentworth, 1st Earl of Strafford, earlier that year. Referring to John Pym, she asked who the roundheaded man was. The principal advisor to Charles II, Edward Hyde, 1st Earl of Clarendon, remarked on the matter, "and from those contestations the two terms of Roundhead and Cavalier grew to be received in discourse, ... they who were looked upon as servants to the king being then called Cavaliers, and the other of the rabble contemned and despised under the name of Roundheads."

After the Anglican Archbishop William Laud made a statute in 1636 instructing all clergy to wear short hair, many Puritans rebelled to show their contempt for his authority and began to grow their hair even longer (as can be seen on their portraits) though they continued to be known as Roundheads. The longer hair was more common among the "Independent" and "high-ranking" Puritans, which included Cromwell, especially toward the end of the Protectorate, while the "Presbyterian" faction, and the military rank and file, continued to reject long hair. By the end of that period, some Independent Puritans were again derisively using the term Roundhead to refer to the Presbyterian Puritans.

Roundhead remained in use to describe those with republican tendencies until the Exclusion Crisis of 1678–1681, when the term was superseded by "Whig", initially another term with pejorative connotations. Likewise, during the Exclusion Bill crisis, the term Cavalier was replaced with "Tory", an Irish term introduced by their opponents that was also initially a pejorative term.
