= Thomas Rowe Edmonds =

Thomas Rowe Edmonds (1803–1889) was an English actuary and political economist.

== Life ==
He was born in Penzance in Cornwall on 20 June 1803, the son of Richard Edmonds who was town clerk of Marazion, and his wife Elizabeth. Richard Edmonds was a younger brother.

Edmonds attended Penzance Grammar School under George Morris. He then entered Trinity College, Cambridge as a sizar in 1822, graduating B.A. in 1826. He worked as an actuary for the Legal and General Life Assurance Society from 1832 to 1866.

Edmonds died in Maida Vale on 6 March 1889.

== Actuary and statistician ==
Edmonds applied the method of Pehr Wilhelm Wargentin for life tables to England, as Joshua Milne had done with data from Carlisle, Cumberland. He became a fellow of the Statistical Society in 1836.

Edmonds wrote a series of 15 papers in The Lancet, from 1836 to 1842, on the topic of mortality and health, the first being "On the laws of collective vitality". It was to be a major influence in the field of epidemiology, as developed by William Farr. While Edmonds and Farr both did pioneer work on vital statistics, the starting point for Edmonds was the needs of life insurance. For Farr, there were applications to mortality and morbidity. It was from the first paper of the Lancet series that Farr acquired a number of central points that Edmonds was making, in particular about collection of data. Edmonds took to campaigning journalism. In The Lancet, and other periodicals edited by Farr and Thomas Wakley, he wrote polemically, in particular against the officials John Rickman and John Finlaison.

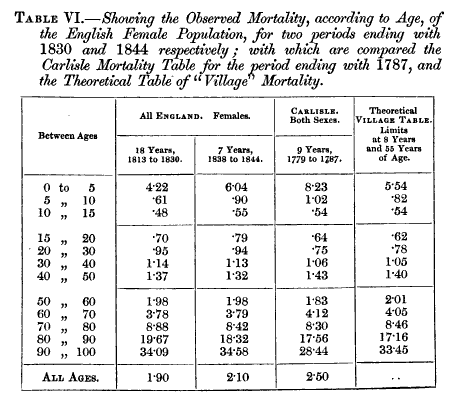
Female mortality life tables compared, from an 1852 paper by Thomas Rowe Edmonds

Two committees of the Statistical Society involved Edmonds. In 1838 he was the leader of a group of six fellows asking for a committee to work on vital statistics. The plan was to circulate insurance offices with a request for information. The matter was taken up by Benjamin Gompertz in correspondence with Charles Babbage. In the end an external group of actuaries was consulted. In 1841 Farr pressed for a committee to collect vital statistics from patients at London hospitals. A distinguished group came together, and two reports were produced.

In 1852 Edmonds gave evidence to a House of Commons committee on income and property tax. The following year he gave evidence to a committee chaired by James Wilson, on the Legal and General's business practices, and assurance associations in general.

== Socialist ==
Edmonds is considered a Ricardian socialist, though this is disputed by Thompson, and an Owenite. He has also been called a "co-operative socialist". He anticipated Karl Marx in a theory of surplus labour and wages, and in postulating the replacement of capitalism by a later stage, which he called the "social system".

== Works ==
Edmonds wrote three books in the period 1828 to 1832.

=== Practical Moral and Political Economy (1828) ===
This work is considered, by J. W. Burrow, to contain evolutionary ideas, Lamarckian and in the style of Erasmus Darwin, and to anticipate Herbert Spencer in introducing such ideas into social thought. On the other hand, Edmonds was a polygenist believing in immutable human species, and no social Darwinist. His analysis of pauperism was inconsistent, but he could attribute it to the effects of private property. F. J. C. Hearnshaw considered that the book foreshadowed Walter Bagehot's Physics and Politics.

=== Life Tables (1832) ===
In Life Tables, founded upon the discovery of a numerical law regulating the existence of every human being (1832), Edmonds claimed as a new discovery on the mortality rate a model on ageing and mortality found in the 1820s by Benjamin Gompertz. He promoted its application to case fatality risk, to medical professionals. He also remarked on many other related topics, such as maximum birth rates and gender mortality differentials.

In his mortality theory, Edmonds took up observations of Richard Price, dividing life into three periods (childhood, "manhood" from age 12 to 55, and old age). He quantified mortality by using different geometric progressions in each period. His table became known as "Edmonds's Mean Mortality". He persisted into the 1860s with his piecewise approach, though by then with two periods, rather than the sigmoid curve model of Gompertz. But Edmonds came in for some rough handling for his continuing assertions of the independence of his model from that of Gompertz. Augustus De Morgan and Thomas Bond Sprague took him to task during the early 1860s, in the Journal of the Institute of Actuaries. This controversy was later thought to have slowed acceptance of the refinement proposed by William Makeham to the Gompertz model, now the Gompertz–Makeham law of mortality.

=== An Enquiry into the Principles of Population (1832) ===
An Enquiry into the Principles of Population, Exhibiting a System of Regulations for the Poor (1832) was anonymous at its publication. Garrett Hardin regarded this book as the first important population theory opposed to that of Robert Malthus. It contains an analysis of famine, as caused by export of food, with remarks on the Irish situation.

In arguing against Malthus, Edmonds (in common with Richard Jones, Augustus Henry Moreton and George Rickards) laid weight on factors that could cause postponement of marriage. In general he relied on "non-moral" effects, and Chapter VIII of the book addressed the possible effects on labourers' fertility of upward mobility. Edmonds attributed some contemporary social problems to the small extent of the middle class. He rejected "Sadler's law" put forth by Michael Thomas Sadler two years earlier, to the effect that higher population density led to lower fertility, on the basis of empirical work in some urban areas. Later research by David Heron confirmed Edmonds's findings, which left open the question of urban versus rural fertility.

== Family ==
Edmonds married Elizabeth Elspith Ruddack in 1833. They had a son, Frederic Bernard.
