= John Pierson =

John Pierson may refer to:

- John Pierson (baseball) (born 1953), American baseball player and coach
- John Pierson (filmmaker) (born 1954), American independent filmmaker
- John Pierson (journalist) (1937–2018), American writer for The Wall Street Journal
- John Pierson (musician), American guitarist
- Jack Pierson (born 1960), American photographer and artist
- John Frederick Pierson (1839–1932), Civil War brevet Brigadier General and society leader

== See also ==
- Johnny Peirson (1925–2021), Canadian ice hockey player
- John Pearson (disambiguation)
