= Piercy Ravenstone =

Piercy Ravenstone was a pseudonym used by a nineteenth-century political economist whose work led him to being variously described as a socialist, a tory and as an institutionalist. His contribution was noted by David Ricardo and Karl Marx and brought to wider attention via Piero Sraffa's editing of Ricardo's collected works. Sraffa suggested that Ravenstone's true identity was Richard Puller (1789–1831).

== Context ==
It has been argued that Ravenstone was a Ricardian socialist. He contributed to the economic debates of the 1820s in England. Edwin Seligman credits him with being "the earliest advocate of the surplus value theory later adopted by Marx."

== Identification ==
Joseph Dorfman argued from circumstantial evidence that Ravenstone was a Rev. Edward Edwards. Noel W. Thompson, in reviewing Sraffa's case and other evidence, concludes that there is no compelling reason now to contest the identification with Richard Puller the younger (not his father of the same name). He also views Edwards and Ravenstone as birds of a feather, however, proponents of a physiocratic Tory anti-capitalism.

== Economics ==
Ravenstone published at least two writings in economic theory, A Few Doubts as to the Correctness of the Opinions generally maintained on the Subjects of Population and Political Economy in 1821, and Thoughts on the Funding System and its Effects, in 1824. Seligman writes that the former work contained criticism of Malthusianism which "[did] not differ from other works of the kind." Ravenstone wrote that private property "is the right to the work of one's own hands," but distinguished this from profit and rent: "But this right is very different from the artificial right by which a man is enabled to appropriate for himself the ownership of lands which he does not occupy, and on which he does not exercise any industry ... On this pretension of the landlord are built the pretensions of the merchant-manufacturer, of the tradesman, of the capitalist. All are founded on the same principle." In this way, Ravenstone claimed, "the labor of the industrious is made subservient to the maintenance of the idle. The laborer must purchase the permission to be useful." Profits arise "from the surplus product of the productive laborer."

== Other references to his work ==
In an unplaced footnote, Marx quotes Ravenstone as denying that government debt may be a "burden" on future generations. This argument would have anticipated similar arguments from Paul Samuelson in the 20th Century and Paul Krugman. Marx discusses Ravenstone's value theory in a section of Theories of Surplus Value, but it seems he was only aware of the second of Ravenstone's books mentioned; Marx refers to it as "a most remarkable work." The same volume has an extended discussion describing Ravenstone's "surplus product" analysis. Henryk Grossman also refers to Ravenstone, along with William Thompson and Thomas Hodgskin, as a thinker who drew out the egalitarian principles implicit in the labor theory of value espoused by William Petty, David Hume, Adam Smith, and David Ricardo, leading to its abandonment by subsequent economists.

== Key works ==
- Piercy Ravenstone (1821). A Few Doubts as to the Correctness of Some Opinions Generally Entertained on the Subjects of Population and Political Economy. J. Andrews.
- Piercy Ravenstone (1824). Thoughts on the Funding System and its effects. J. Andrews.
