= Pull =

Pull may refer to:

== Sports ==
- In baseball, a pull hitter is a batter who usually hits the ball to the side of the field from which he bats
- Pull shot, a batting stroke in cricket
- A phase of a swim stroke
- A throw-off in the sport of ultimate (originally called ultimate frisbee)
- The Hope College Pull, an annual tug-of-war competition at Hope College in Holland, Michigan

== Music ==
- Pull (Winger album) (1993)
- Pull, a 1993 album by Arcwelder
- Pull (Mr. Mister album) (2010)
- "Pull", a song from the album Nico by Blind Melon
- "Pull", a song by Candiria from the album The Process of Self-Development, 1999

== Other uses ==
- Muscle pull, a strain injury
- Drawer pull or handle
- Pull (physics), a force that acts in the direction of the origin of the force
- "The Pull", an episode of the TV series Sons of Anarchy

== See also ==
- Pulling (disambiguation)
- Push (disambiguation)
