= Social parasitism (offense) =

Crime of living at the expense of others

Social parasitism was considered a political crime in the Soviet Union, where individuals accused of living off the efforts of others or society were prosecuted. The Soviet Union, proclaiming itself a workers' state, mandated that every capable adult engage in work until retirement, theoretically eliminating unemployment.

== Soviet Union ==
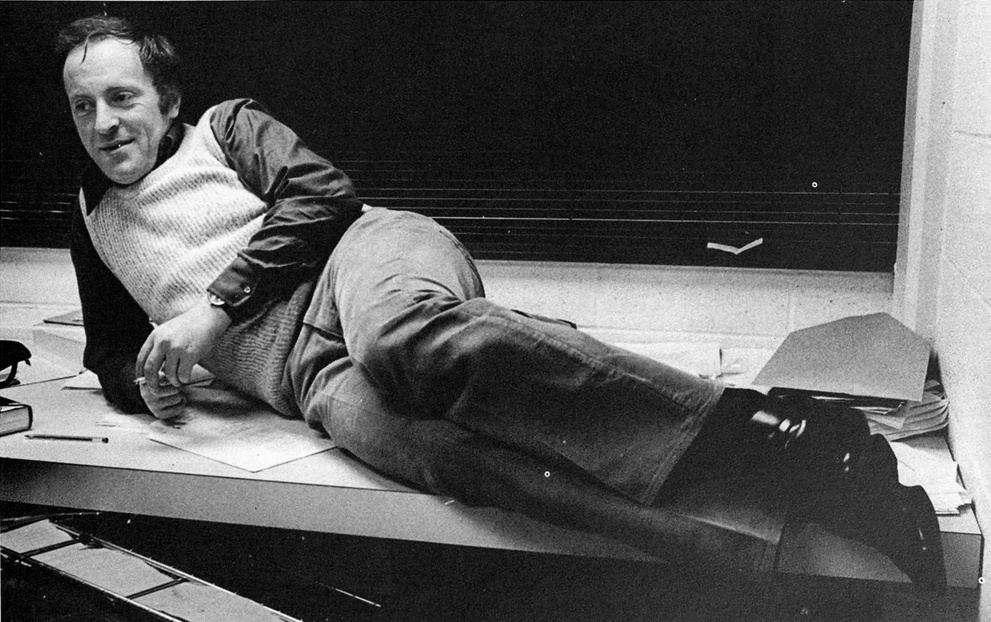
Russian poet Joseph Brodsky (1940–1996) was sentenced in 1964 to five years of hard labor in Arkhangelsk Oblast for "social parasitism".

In the Soviet Union, which declared itself a workers' state, every adult able-bodied person was expected to work until official retirement. Thus unemployment was officially and theoretically eliminated. Those who refused to work, study or serve in another way risked being criminally charged with social parasitism (Russian: тунеядство tuneyadstvo, тунеядцы [tuneyadets/tuneyadtsy"), in accordance with the socialist principle "from each according to his ability, to each according to his contribution."

On 4 May 1961 the law "On Intensification of the Struggle against Persons who avoid Socially Useful Work and lead an Anti-social Parasitic Way of Life" which criminalised parasitism entered into force. Those who refused to work were critiqued as "able-bodied citizens who refuse to fulfil their important constitutional duty - to perform honest work to the best of their ability".

In 1961, 130,000 people were identified as leading the "anti-social, parasitic way of life" in the Russian Soviet Federative Socialist Republic. Charges of parasitism were frequently applied to the homeless, vagrants, beggars, dissidents and refuseniks, many of whom were intellectuals. Since their writings were considered anti-establishment, the state prevented them from obtaining employment. To avoid trials for parasitism, many of them took unskilled (but not especially time-consuming) jobs (street sweepers, boiler room attendants, etc.), which allowed them to continue their other pursuits.

For example, the Russian poet Joseph Brodsky was charged with social parasitism by the Soviet authorities. A 1964 trial found that his series of odd jobs and role as a poet were not a sufficient contribution to society.

A number of Soviet intellectuals and dissidents were accused of the crime of parasitism, including Iosif Begun, Vladimir Voinovich, Lev Kopelev and Andrei Amalrik.

== Belarus ==
On 2 April 2015 President Alexander Lukashenko issued a decree 'On Prevention of Social Dependency', which included a tax for those categorised "social parasites". Lukashenko said the policy was brought in to respond to the half a million citizens who refused to work. The decree said the policy's purpose was "to prevent freeloading, encourage employment among able-bodied citizens, and to ensure the compliance with the constitutional obligation of the citizens to participate in the financing of state expenditures". Individuals exempt from the policy were students, minors, disabled people, retirees, prisoners, and parents with children below the age of seven or those with three or more children who were minors.

Defined as people working under 183 days in a year, and excluding home-makers and subsistence farmers, the deployment of the so-called parasite tax was suspended after protests in several major urban centers.

== Hungary ==
Social parasitism (direct translation from Hungarian: Publicly menace work evasion-Közveszélyes munkakerülés, abbreviated: KMK) was a criminal offense prosecuted by the 20th century's Hungarian legal system, which was part of the law in force between 1913 and 1989.

In the early 1900s, the need arose to address the situation of the unemployed, unwilling to work, begging, and vagrant masses: the institution of workhouses was considered more effective than the institution of workhouses. Workhouses – where the daily working time was ten hours – were established in a separate part of prisons; for men, the Jászberény Royal District Court Prison was designated, and for women, the Kalocsa Royal Court Prison was designated. According to Article XXI of 1913 on Publicly menace work evasion: "A person of working age who is referred to the court and who shuns work or otherwise engages in a work-avoiding lifestyle shall be punished by imprisonment for a term of eight days to two months for an offence." The same law criminalized illegal gambling and the plying of prostitutes/sex work as work-avoiding that is dangerous to the public. Foreigners could also be expelled from the country if they were classified as work-avoiding that is menace to the public. After the Communist took over in Hungary, they re-established this article especially because they had shortage of workers. Publicly menace evasion of work was a legally punishable offense or misdemeanor, and its prosecution was an important police task. "Its perpetrators endanger public safety and public order. Those who do not work through no fault of their own usually become criminals, because there is hardly any other way to satisfy their basic life needs (support, profit, inheritance, etc.)."

The Penal Code adopted in 1978(38§) provided for the following regarding evasion: "A person capable of working who engages in a work-avoiding lifestyle, if he has previously been punished for a public-menace work-avoiding offense or violation of the law and two years have not yet passed since the sentence was served or its enforceability ceased, commits a misdemeanor and is punishable by imprisonment for up to one year, corrective labor, or a fine. As an additional punishment, disqualification is also possible."

Under the Kádár regime (1956-1988), 2–300 people were convicted annually for work evasion menace to the public, and over 2,000 were sentenced to misdemeanor detention. Legislative Decree 19 of 1984 introduced stricter correctional labor in order to "accustom work" to regular work. Subsequently, the number of so-called work evasion offenders sentenced by court judgment increased to over 2,000.

Work evasion that was dangerous to the public has not been a criminal offense since Act XXIII of 1989 came into effect.

== Romania ==
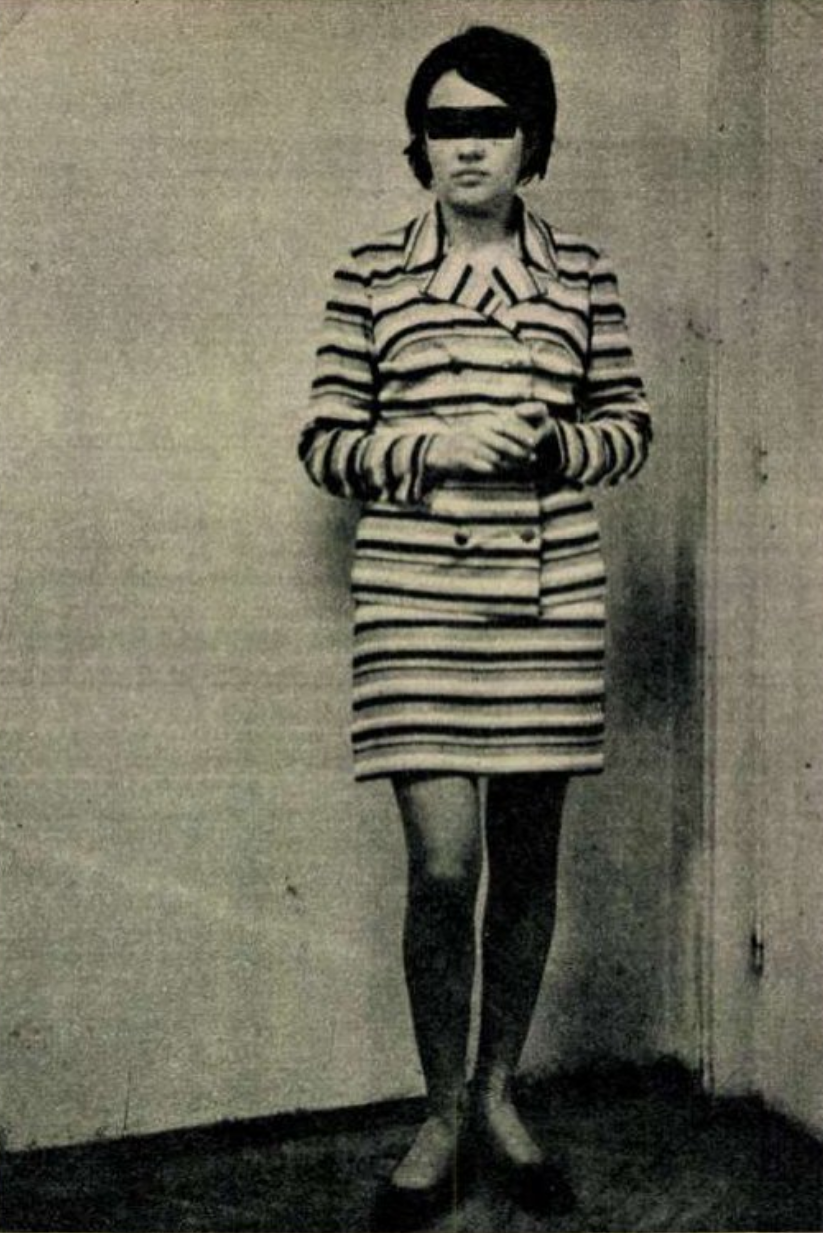
Romanian prostitute, convicted of social parasitism in Constanța, 1970.

Nicolae Ceaușescu, president of the Socialist Republic of Romania, criminalized social parasitism by decree in 1970. The regime viewed young people as potentially destabilizing and targeted those who did not fit into socialist norms. Citizens could be stopped if they were found on the street during hours when they should have been at work or school. Penalties were imprisonment for one to six months, or a fine of 1,000 to 5,000 lei. Indecent or obscene gestures or words carried penalties of 20 days to three months in prison, or a fine of up to 2,000 lei.

A 1976 law broadened the campaign against parasitism. It stated that if someone able to work refused a job, they could be forced by court order to work for one year on construction sites, farms, in forests, or factories. The Miliția was tasked with enforcing the measures, and its actions were often arbitrary.

== See also ==
- Ableism
- Alternative Lifestyles
- Counterculture
- Economy of the Soviet Union
- He who does not work, neither shall he eat
- Refusal of work
- To each according to his contribution
- Vagrancy
- Work ethic
- Workhouse
