= Norman Pearson (priest) =

British cleric and writer (1787–1865)

John Norman Pearson (1787–1865) of Tunbridge Wells and London was a prolific Victorian writer on religious subjects.

== Life ==
Son of the surgeon John Pearson (1758–1826), born 7 December 1787, he was educated at Trinity College, Cambridge. There he gained the Hulsean prize in 1807.

Pearson then took holy orders, and acted as chaplain to the Marquess of Wellesley. In 1826 the Church Missionary Society appointed him the first principal of its newly founded missionary college at Islington. In 1839 he was appointed vicar of Holy Trinity Church, Tunbridge Wells, a position which he resigned in 1853. He then retired, doing occasional duty for the surrounding clergy, at Bower Hall, near Steeple Bumpstead in Essex, until his death in October 1865.

== Works ==
Pearson's works were:

- A Critical Essay on the Ninth Book of Warburton's Divine Legation of Moses, Cambridge, 1808.
- Christ Crucified; or some Remarkable Passages of the Sufferings of Our Lord Jesus Christ, devotionally and practically considered, London, 1826.
- Life of Archbishop Leighton, prefixed to an edition of his Works in 1829.
- The Candle of the Lord uncovered; or the Bible rescued from Papal Thraldom by the Reformation, London, 1835.
- The Faith and Patience of the Saints exhibited in the Narrative of the Sufferings and the Death … of I. Lefevere; a new translation, 1839.
- Psalms and Hymns chiefly designed for Public Worship, London, 1840.
- The Days in Paradise, London, 1854.

He also published several volumes of sermons.

== Family ==
Pearson married Harriet, daughter of Richard Puller of London, and sister of Sir Christopher Puller, Chief Justice of Bengal, and Richard Puller the presumed pseudonymous "Piercy Ravenstone". They had a numerous family. Among the sons were Sir John Pearson, QC, and Charles Henry Pearson.
