= Christopher William Puller =

English barrister and politician

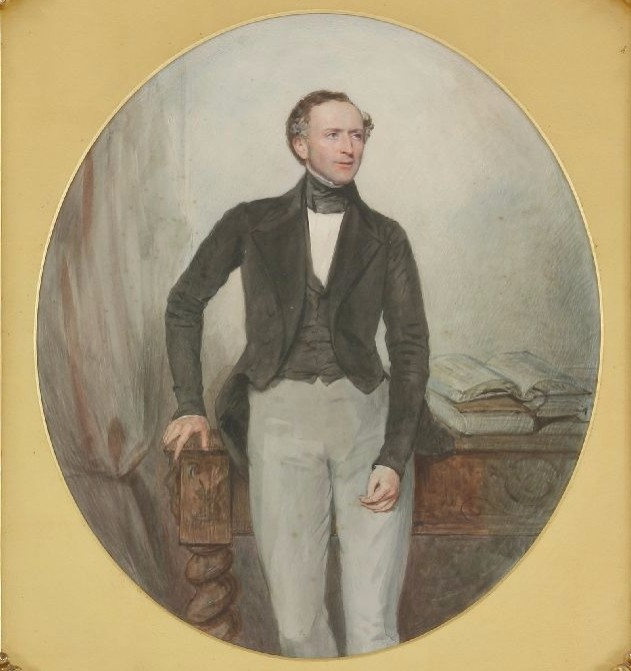
Christopher William Puller

Christopher William Puller (1807–1864), from 1857 Christopher William Giles Puller, was an English barrister and politician.

== Life ==
The son of Sir Christopher Puller and his wife Louise King, he was educated at Eton College and Christ Church, Oxford. A college friend of W. E. Gladstone, he graduated B.A. in 1828, and M.A. in 1832. He was called to the bar at Lincoln's Inn in 1832, and went into practice as a chancery barrister. He resided at Youngsbury.

At the 1857 general election, Puller became Member of Parliament for Hertfordshire; and he was re-elected in 1859. He was a Liberal who took an interest in the church rate debates of 1858 to 1861. He was also regarded as an expert on the education issue.

Giles Puller was in 1858 a secretary of the India Missions Extension of the Society for the Propagation of the Gospel; he had been on the Standing Committee of the Society from 1850. He died on 16 February 1864 at Youngsbury. His replacement as Member of Parliament was Henry Surtees.

== Legacy ==
A memorial window was created in St Mary's Church, Standon, Hertfordshire. The High Cross Puller Memorial primary school was built by the family to his memory.

== Family ==
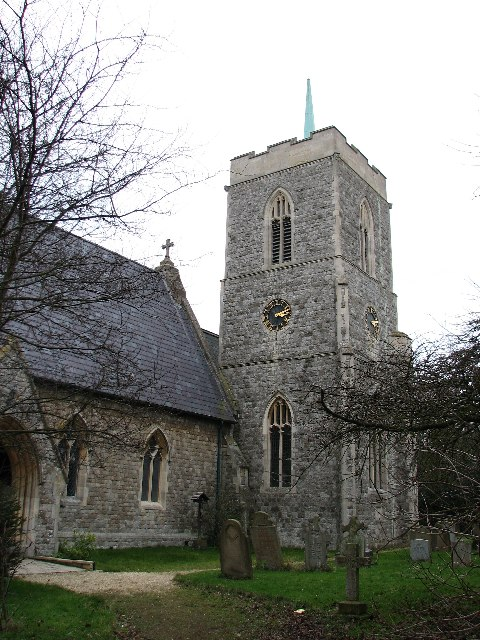
St John the Evangelist church in Standon, Hertfordshire, built in 1847 by Christopher William Puller and his mother, to a design by Anthony Salvin

Puller married Emily Blake, daughter of William Blake, on 2 July 1831. They had five sons and four daughters. Their children included:

- Arthur Giles (born 1833), the eldest son.
- Charles (born 1834), the second son, who was a Fellow of Trinity College, Cambridge, and vicar of Standon, Hertfordshire.
- Christopher Cholmeley (1839–1902), Treasury clerk.
- Frederick William (1842–1938), fourth son, a clergyman who joined the Society of St John the Evangelist.
- Mary Caroline, who married John Garnier (1838–1929), son of Thomas Garnier.
- Alice Henrietta, the youngest daughter, married in 1882 Claude Cecil Thornton as his second wife; he was vicar of High Cross, Hertfordshire from 1881 to 1892.
