= Pulling =

Pulling may refer to:

- Pulling (TV series), a 2000s British TV series
- Truck pulling and tractor pulling, a motor sport
- Pulling (American football), an offensive maneuver in American football
- Pulling station, a railway station on the Munich S-Bahn
- Rowing, or a specific type of rowing
- Pulling, pouring milk between two cups to alter its consistency, as when making teh tarik

== People ==
- Pulling (surname)

== See also ==
- Pull (disambiguation)
