= Charles Henry Pearson =

Australian politician

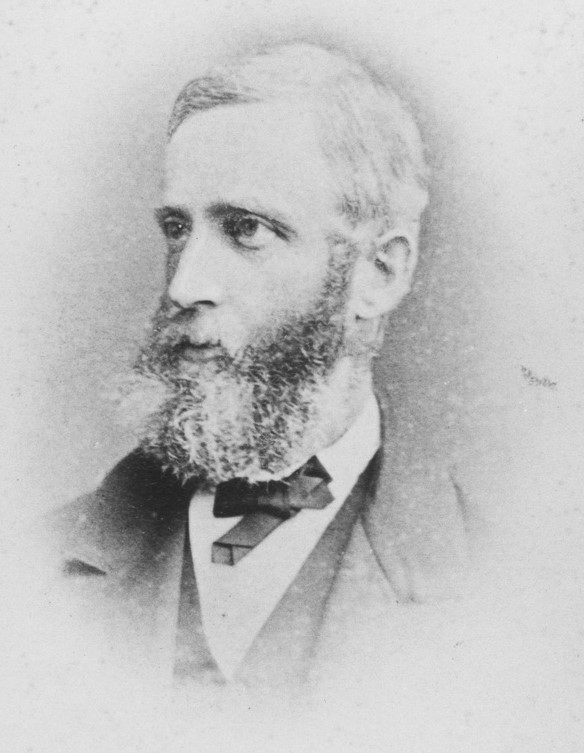
- Pearson c. 1875
- Born: 7 September 1830; London, England
- Died: 29 May 1894 (aged 63); London, England

Charles Henry Pearson (7 September 1830 – 29 May 1894) was a British-born Australian historian, educationist, politician and journalist. According to John Tregenza, "Pearson was the outstanding intellectual of the Australian colonies. A democrat by conviction, he combined a Puritan determination in carrying reforms with a gentle manner and a scrupulous respect for the traditional rules and courtesies of public debate."

== Early life ==
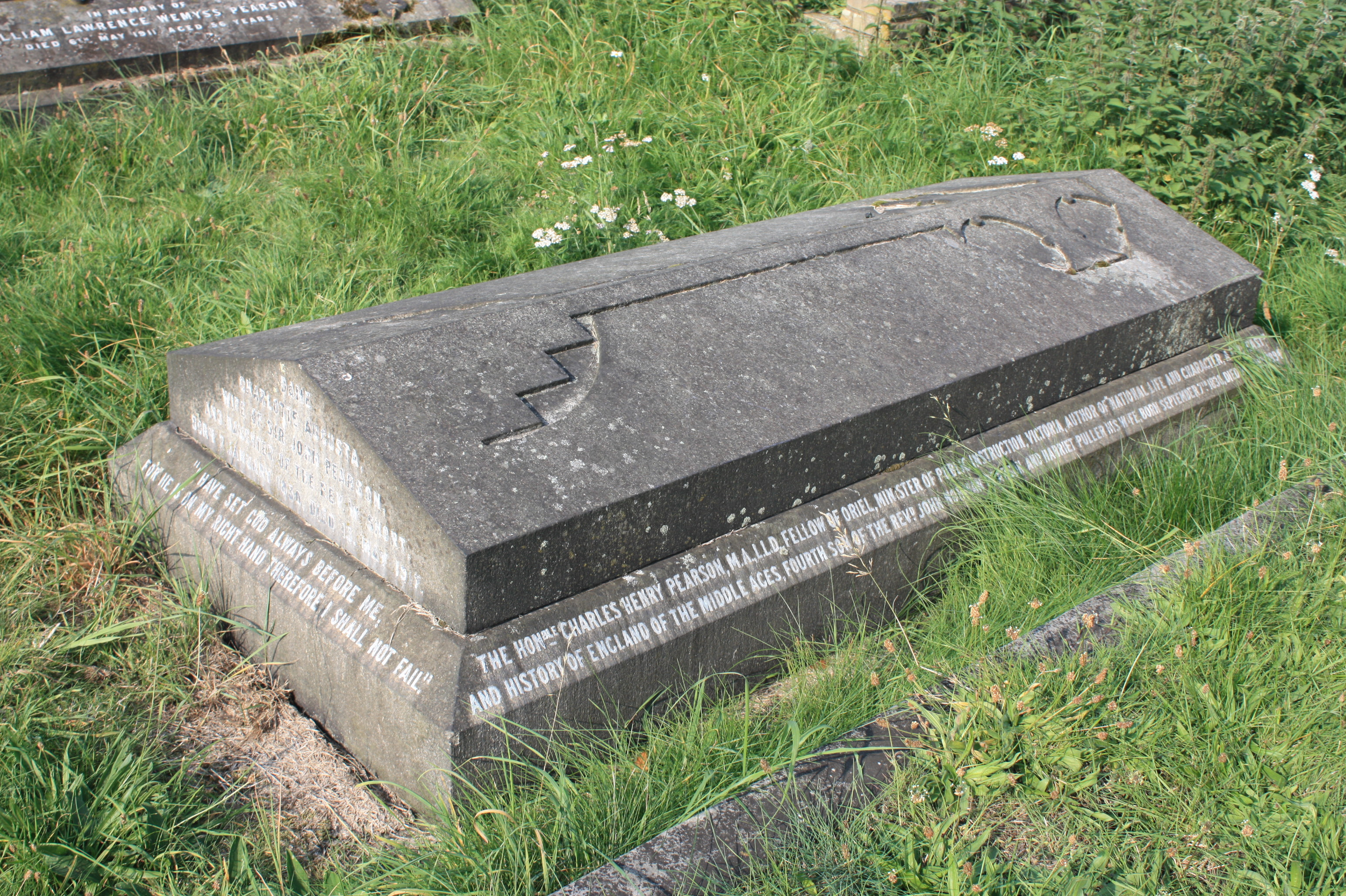
The grave of Charles Henry Pearson, Brompton Cemetery, London

Pearson was born at Islington, London, fourth son (and tenth child) of the Rev. John Norman Pearson, M.A., then principal of the Church Missionary College, Islington, and Harriet née Puller. He was a younger brother of Sir John Pearson, QC.

== National Life and Character: a Forecast ==
Pearson's book, National Life and Character: a Forecast, had been published at the beginning of 1893, and created an international sensation. Theodore Roosevelt wrote to Pearson to praise the book; Prime Minister William Ewart Gladstone recommended it highly, and the late nineteenth century English novelist George Gissing read it in January 1896.

Pearson's book caused a shock because it challenged the conventional wisdom about Western expansion, progress and triumph. Pearson argued that the "Black and Yellow" races were in the ascendant, as they were powered by population increase and, in the case of the Chinese, industrial capacity. He argued the so-called higher races, under the impact of declining birth rates and state socialism, had become "stationary." Colonized and otherwise subordinated peoples would soon escape relations of 'tutelage' and become self-governing states active on the world stage. Pearson was a prophet of decolonization and was immediately seen as such, with great attention paid to his theme of the white man under siege.

The argument strongly reinforced demands for a White Australia policy.

In August 1902 Prime Minister Edmund Barton, spoke in parliament in support of the White Australia policy; he quoted Pearson's disturbing forecast:

"The day will come, and perhaps is not far distant, when the European observer will look round to see the globe girdled with a continuous zone of the black and yellow races, no longer too weak for aggression or under tutelage, but independent, or practically so, in government, monopolising the trade of their own regions, and circumscribing the industry of the Europeans; when Chinamen and the natives of Hindostan, the states of Central and South America, by that time predominantly Indian . . . are represented by fleets in the European seas, invited to international conferences and welcomed as allies in quarrels of the civilized world. The citizens of these countries will then be taken up into the social relations of the white races, will throng the English turf or the salons of Paris, and [End Page 43] will be admitted to inter-marriage. It is idle to say that if all this should come to pass our pride of place will not be humiliated.... We shall wake to find ourselves elbowed and hustled, and perhaps even thrust aside by peoples whom we looked down upon as servile and thought of as bound always to minister to our needs. The solitary consolation will be that the changes have been inevitable."

== Sources ==
- Marilyn Lake, "The White Man under Siege: New Histories of Race in the Nineteenth Century and the Advent of White Australia," History Workshop Journal 58 (2004) 41–62 in Project Muse
- John Tregenza, Professor of Democracy: the Life of Charles Henry Pearson 1830–1894, Oxford Don and Australian Radical, Melbourne, 1968
- Charles H. Pearson, Reviews and Critical Essays, ed. Herbert Augustus Strong, London, 1896 full text online
- Charles H. Pearson, History of England During the Early and Middle Ages (1876) text online
