= Richard Puller =

English banker (1747-1826)

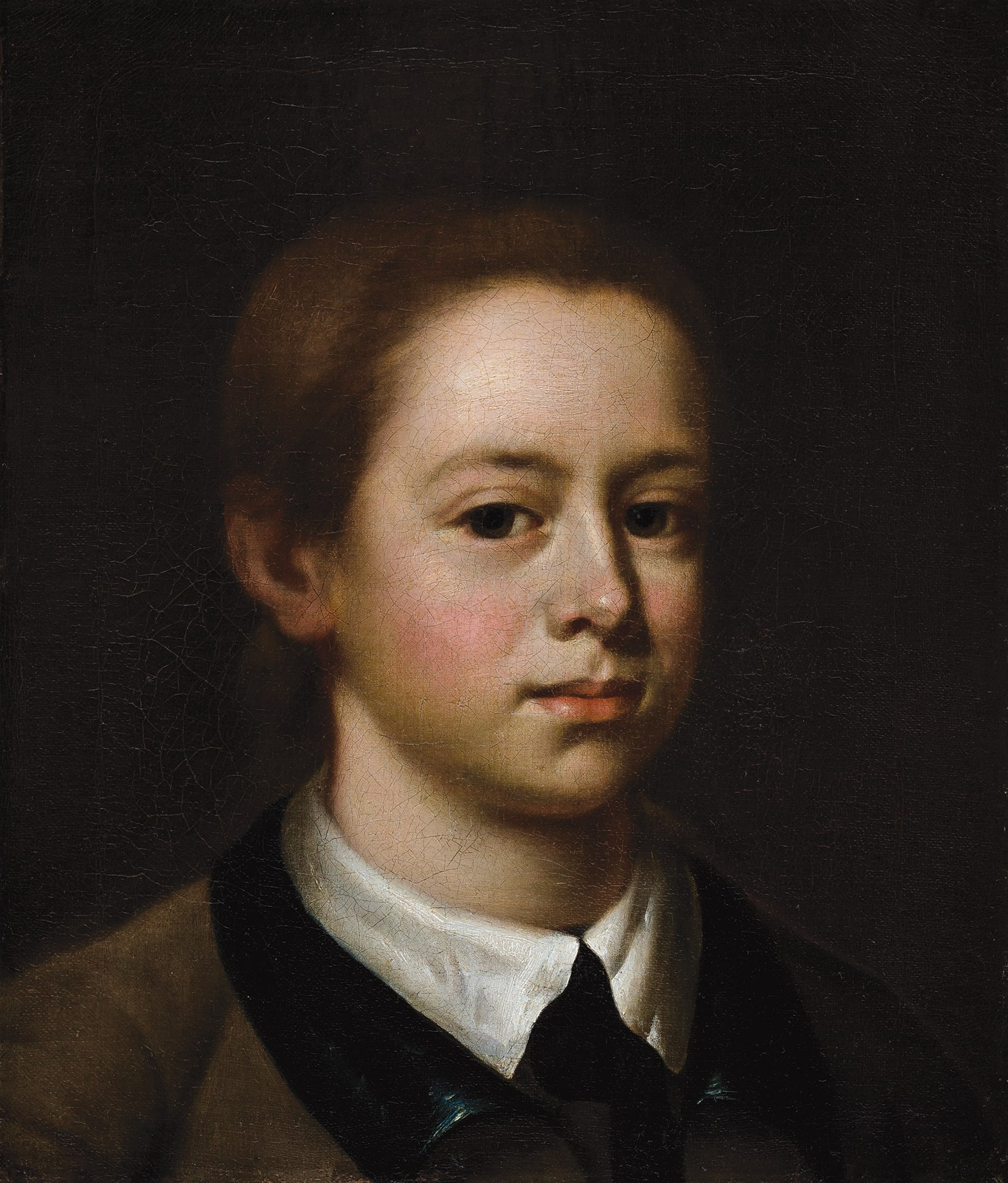
Painting of Richard Puller (1747-1826) as a child done by Joseph Highmore.

Richard Puller (1747–1826) was a prominent English merchant banker in London. He has sometimes been identified as the pseudonymous economic writer Piercy Ravenstone, considered a precursor of Karl Marx; but scholarly sources generally now follow the suggestion of Piero Sraffa that Ravenstone was Richard Puller the younger (1789–1831), his son.

== Life ==
He was the son of Christopher Puller (died 1789), also a prominent London merchant banker. His father was a director of the Bank of England, while he was a director of the South Sea Company;

Richard and Charles Puller, of 10 Broadstreet Buildings, were the London bankers of John Adams during the 1780s; Adams refers also to the firm as Conde & Puller. This was also the period of the Fourth Anglo-Dutch War, and Richard Puller acted as an agent in a case concerning a captured Dutch ship.

In later life Puller resided at Painswick Court in Gloucestershire. He died there, on 5 December 1826.

== Family ==
Puller married Selina Wall, daughter of Thomas Wall of Albury Park, Surrey. (Wall is so called. The Wall family of Albury Park were Charles Wall of Barings Bank and his wife Francis, daughter of Sir Francis Baring; they were the parents of Charles Baring Wall, the Member of Parliament. The house was bought in 1811 from Samuel Thornton, sold in 1819 to Henry Drummond. Charles Wall's parents were Thomas Wall (1721–1812) and Elizabeth Ellis.) The following were their children:

- Sir Christopher Puller (1774–1824)
- Henry Puller (1782–1813), an officer in the Bengal Army. He died at Rangpur.
- Richard Puller the younger (1789–1831). He is now the usual identification of the pseudonymous economic writer, Piercy Ravenstone. It has also been suggested that the elder Richard Puller might be Ravenstone, and this identification is made in the Oxford Dictionary of National Biography.
- Harriet, who married John Norman Pearson.
- Charlotte Louisa
- Selina Eliza, the third daughter, married John Cholmondeley, rector of Brandiston. He was a brother of Sir Montague Cholmeley, 1st Baronet.
