= John Pearson (surgeon) =

British surgeon

John Pearson, FRS (3 January 1758, in York – 12 May 1826, in London) was a British surgeon in the late eighteenth and early nineteenth centuries.

After an apprenticeship in Morpeth he studied under William Hey. In 1780 he came to St. George's Hospital, London to work under John Hunter. He became house surgeon at Lock Hospital staying until 1818. He was also surgeon to the Public Dispensary, Carey Street. His son John Norman Pearson was an eminent Anglican priest. Pearson's library was sold at auction in London by Stewart, Wheatley & Adlard on 6 November 1826 (and five following days); a copy of the sale catalogue is held at Cambridge University Library (shelfmark Munby.c.151(12)).
