= Youngsbury =

Country house in Hertfordshire, England

Coordinates: 51°50′34″N 0°00′51″W

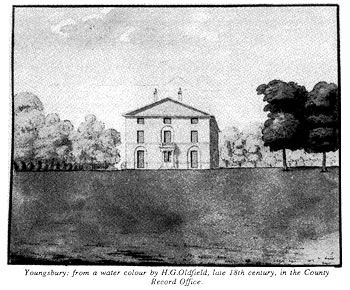
Youngsbury House, by Henry George Oldfield

Youngsbury House is a Grade II listed house near Wadesmill, Hertfordshire, England. The stable block is Grade II* listed. The house was built in about 1745 by David Poole. There are 97 acres of grounds, and gardens landscaped by Capability Brown. They are listed Grade II*.

== People connected with it ==
David Barclay, the Quaker banker and abolitionist, bought the manor in 1769, and enlarged the house. A plan by Capability Brown the following year introduced a serpentine lake, using the waters of the River Rib. Barclay sold it in 1793, after the death of his second wife, to William Cunliffe Shawe, and it passed in 1796 to Daniel Giles. Christopher William Giles-Puller, MP for Hertfordshire from 1857 until his death in 1864, lived there.

In 2012, it was for sale, "offers in excess of £3,900,000". As of 2015, it was owned by Jeremy Langmead, the former editor of Wallpaper* magazine and Esquire magazine, who used to be married to writer India Knight.

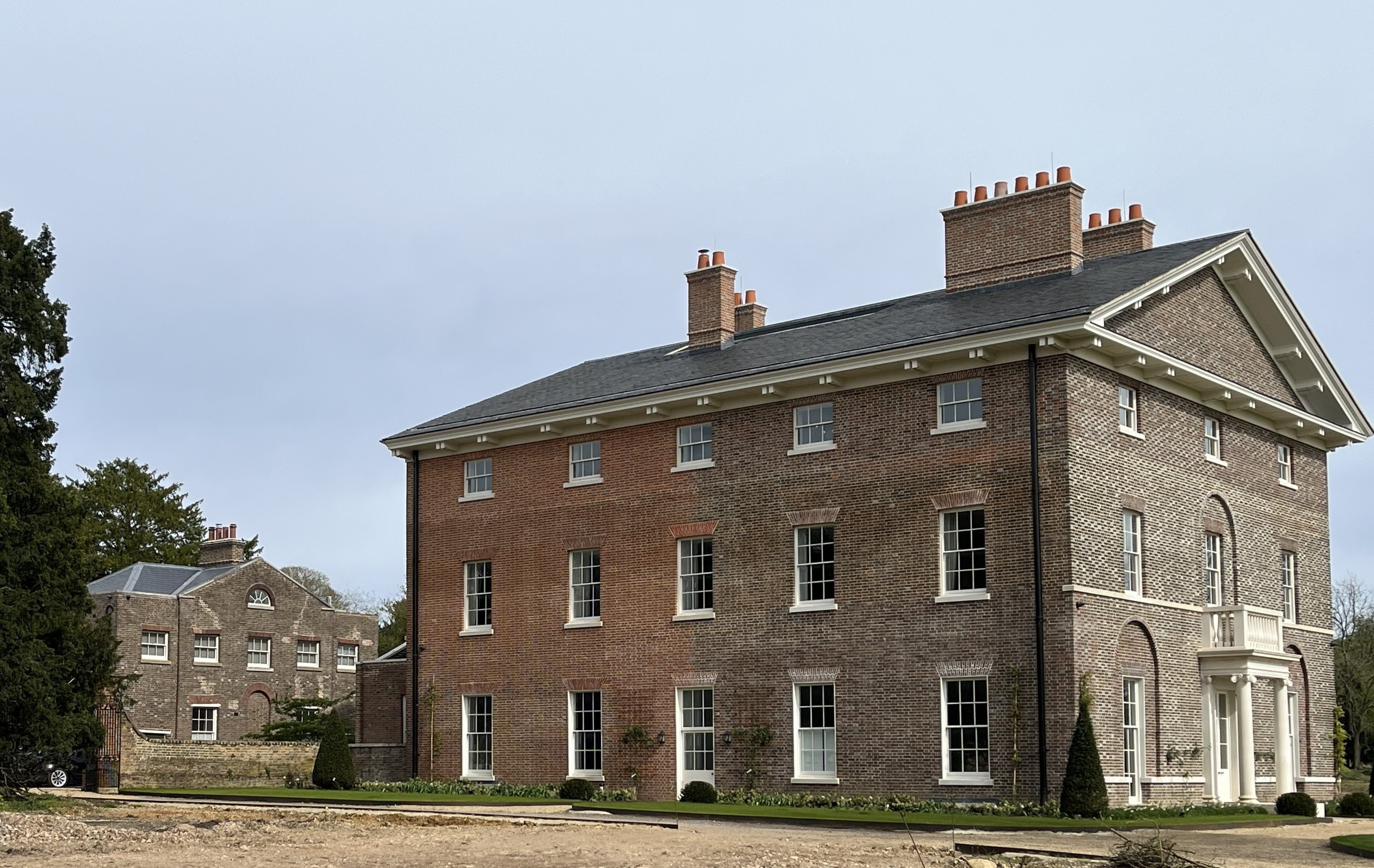
Youngsbury 2024
