= Charles Hall (economist) =

British physician, social critic, and Ricardian socialist

- Born: 1740
- Died: 1825 (aged 84–85)
- Occupation: Physician
- Known for: Critic of capitalism and early socialist

Charles Hall (1740–1825) was a British physician, social critic and Ricardian socialist who published The Effects of Civilization on the People in European States in 1805, condemning capitalism for its inability to provide for the poor. In the book, Hall argued that inequalities in wealth and the production of luxuries resulted in the exploitation of the poor, and their suffering. Hall famously claimed that the exploitation of the poor was so severe that they "retained only the product of one hour's work out of eight".

As a remedy for the problems in society, Hall proposed land reform and progressive taxation. His opinions and economic theory, particularly his opinions concerning the exploitation of the poor, were important to the development of Marxism, and have caused many to consider him one of the earliest socialists.

== Biography ==
Hall was born in England about 1740, and studied medicine at the University of Leiden in the Netherlands. After completing his medical studies, Hall practised in the West Country of England, where he acquired "intimate knowledge of the living conditions of the poor". Hall read the theories of a number of influential classical economists, including Malthus, David Ricardo and Adam Smith. While he disagreed with many of the ideas of classical economics, they evidently influenced his thinking. Hall's thinking was also influenced by his friendship with the land-socialization advocate Thomas Spence, with whom he corresponded regularly.

Hall relocated around throughout his career, but probably spent most of his life in Tavistock, Devon, practising medicine. In 1785, he published The Family Medical Instructor, a medical reference book. Thereafter, his publications were primarily economic in nature. In 1805, he published his principal work, The Effects of Civilization, followed by Observations on the Principal Conclusion in Mr. Malthus's Essay on Population in 1813. In 1816, Hall was arrested for failure to pay a debt of £157, and he spent the next nine years in the Fleet Prison, before being released on 21 June 1825. While the exact date of his death is uncertain, it is believed that he died soon thereafter.

== The Effects of Civilization ==
After witnessing costly food prices and food shortages in England from 1795 to 1801, Hall began to write The Effects of Civilization on the People in European States, which set forth his economic theories. Hall argued that the main cause of food shortage was that too few people worked in agriculture, and too many were employed in trade and manufacturing. From that argument, Hall proceeded to his definition of wealth, arguing that "wealth consists not in things but in power over the labour of others".

=== The cause of shortages ===
From his definition of wealth, Hall argued that the problem of poverty in civilised societies derived from the ability of the wealthy, through their control of the labour of others, to determine what is produced. Because the wealthy quickly provide for their own necessities, they spend their surplus on luxuries, which "make it possible for a rich man to consume and destroy infinitely more of the produce of other men's labours than he would be able to do if only foodstuffs and basic necessities were available". Because the rich exploit the poor to produce their luxuries, Hall argued that "the wealth of the rich and the misery of the poor increase in strict proportion". Thus, the increasing power of the rich is the cause of the suffering of the poor.

=== Statistics ===
In addition to developing a theoretical model in The Effects of Civilization, Hall attempted to use scientific methods and government statistics to provide evidence for his opinion. According to his estimates, the top 20% of society, the rich, consumed seven eighths of what was produced by the poor, leaving the poor with only one eighth of what they had produced. Later scholars, however, have computed that the inequalities described by Hall were not quite so severe.

=== Remedies ===
After describing the cause of poverty, Hall proposed several remedies. Hall was a strong proponent of progressive taxation to end the inequalities of society and also argued that if marriages between two people who owned land were prohibited, wealth would gradually spread more evenly throughout society. Most importantly, on the basis of his argument that luxuries caused the suffering of the poor, Hall argued that luxury goods "should be prohibited, or subject to punitive taxation". Hall believed that his remedies were "readily practicable" and would improve the station of the poor but that they were unlikely to solve the problems of society completely.

== Legacy ==
Hall is regarded widely as important to the development of Marxist thought, and Karl Marx referred to him as "a true phenomenon in the history of economic thought". Hall was also an important precursor of Henry George and one of the first modern land reformers.

Many scholars also identify Hall as one of the "first of the early socialists" and one of the first thinkers to recognise the importance of surplus value and rents to societal inequality.
