= John Pearson (footballer, born 1946) =

English footballer

Personal information
- Full name: John Pearson
- Date of birth: 18 October 1946 (age 80)
- Place of birth: Wigan, Lancashire, England
- Height: 5 ft 9 in (1.75 m)
- Position: Winger

Youth career
- –1963: Manchester United

Senior career*
Years	Team	Apps	(Gls)
1963–1965	Manchester United	0	(0)
1965–1966	York City	15	(4)
- Horwich RMI
Total		15	(4)

International career
- England schools
- * Club domestic league appearances and goals

John Pearson (born 18 October 1946) is an English former professional footballer who played as a winger in the Football League for York City, in non-League football for Horwich RMI, and was on the books of Manchester United without making a league appearance. He was capped by England schools.
