= William Thompson (philosopher) =

Irish political economist and social reformer (1775–1833)

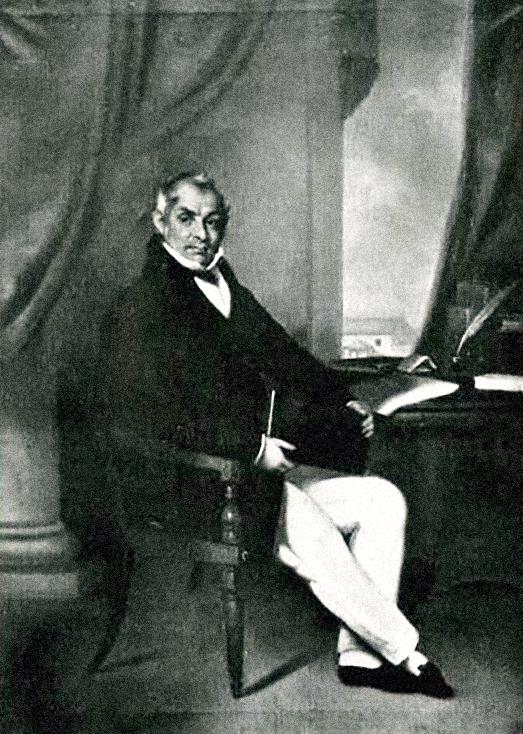
- Portrait of W. Thompson by George Chinnery, c. 1830
- Born: 30 June 1775; Cork, County Cork, Kingdom of Ireland
- Died: 28 March 1833 (aged 57); Rosscarbery, County Cork, Kingdom of Ireland

Education
- Academic advisor: Jeremy Bentham (epistolary correspondent)

Philosophical work
- Era: Modern philosophy: 19th-century philosophy
- Region: Western philosophy
- School: Cooperative movement; Utilitarianism
- Main interests: Economics; Politics; Society
- Notable ideas: "Competition" (term); "Social science" (term); Surplus value

William Thompson (30 June 1775 – 28 March 1833) was an Irish political and philosophical writer and social reformer, developing from utilitarianism into an early critic of capitalist exploitation whose ideas influenced the cooperative, trade union and Chartist movements as well as Karl Marx.

Born into the Anglo-Irish Protestant Ascendancy of wealthy landowners and merchants of Cork society, his attempt to will his estate to the cooperative movement after his death sparked a long court case as his family fought successfully to have the will annulled. According to E. T. Craig, this decision to will his estate to the cooperative movement was taken after a visit to the pioneering Ralahine Commune.

Marxist James Connolly described him as the "first Irish socialist" and a forerunner to Marx, who cited Thompson in his works as well as being an influence upon Marx's thought.

== Life ==
Born in Cork, William was the son and heir of one of the most prosperous merchants of that city, Alderman John Thompson, who held, amongst other offices, that of Mayor in 1794. William inherited the small trading fleet and landed estate near Glandore, West Cork after his father's death in 1814. Rejecting the role of absentee landlord commonly led by those of a similar situation, William based his living quarters on the estate and despite many travels, invested much time with the tenants on the estate introducing agricultural innovations, services and education for children aimed at improving the welfare and prosperity of the families present.

By the 1830s, he was suffering from a chest affliction that finally killed him on 28 March 1833. He had never married and left no direct heir. Thompson was an atheist.

== Ideas ==
An enthusiastic student of the writers and ideas of the Enlightenment, particularly Condorcet, Thompson became a convinced egalitarian and democrat. His support for the French Revolution earned him the label of "Red Republican" from Cork society and his support for advocates of Catholic emancipation in elections further alienated him from the rest of his wealthy Protestant kith and kin.

Thompson was greatly impressed by the utilitarianism of Jeremy Bentham, with whom he corresponded and established a friendship, later staying at the English philosopher's house for several months in 1821–22 while visiting London. As well as Bentham, Thompson read and corresponded with other utilitarian contemporaries such as James Mill, and was influenced, both positively and negatively, by William Godwin and Thomas Malthus. His desire to overcome the limitations of Godwin's "intellectual speculations" and Malthus's "mechanical speculations" led him to propose a new synthesis: social science – Thompson was the first to introduce this term – which would combine political economy's concern with scientific materialism with utilitarianism's concern with rational morality.

=== Contribution to political economy ===
It was the contrasting ideas of Godwin and Malthus that spurred Thompson into the project of research into the role of distribution in political economy that led him to London and, in 1824, the publication of An Inquiry into the Principles of the Distribution of Wealth (see biblio. for full title). Thompson had also become acquainted with the work of the French utopian socialists including Charles Fourier, Henri Saint-Simon, and the economist Sismondi.

In the Inquiry, Thompson follows the line of the labour theory of value put forward by Adam Smith. However he characterizes the appropriation of the majority of "surplus value" – a term he coined, though it was later popularized by Marx – by the capitalist owner of the tools of production as exploitation. He rejects the Malthus/Mill proposition that any increase in the wage of the workers can only result in their further immiseration, noting the self-serving nature of this theory for capitalists pressing for legislation to outlaw workers efforts to raise their wages. By applying the utilitarian principle of "the greatest good for the greatest number" to the existing and possible alternative schemes of distribution, Thompson comes down on the side of an egalitarian distribution of the product.

One of Thompson's colleagues in the Cooperative movement, John Minter Morgan, made the observation that he was the first to coin the term competitive to describe the existing economic system. The case for the originality of this work is further made by Max Nettlau who states: "[Thompson's] book, however, discloses his own evolution; having started with a demand for the full product of labour as well as the regulation of distribution, he ended up with his own conversion to communism, that is, unlimited distribution."

In 1827, fellow Ricardian socialist Thomas Hodgskin published Labour Defended which also characterised the appropriation of the majority of the fruits of production by landlord and capitalist as exploitation defrauding the worker of the full product of their labour. However, Hodgskin proposed that the road to economic justice for the labourer was through a reformed competitive system. Thompson replied with Labor Rewarded defending cooperative communism against Hodgskin's unequal wages.

=== Feminism ===
Although he rejected the political and economic implications of Malthus' essay on population, Thompson recognised that, particularly in Ireland, unrestrained population growth did pose the threat of rising poverty. As such, he was like Bentham and Francis Place an advocate of the benefits of contraception. Thompson's development of a critique of the contemporary status of women was most strongly influenced by his long-term close friendship with Anna Wheeler. He had met Wheeler while staying with Bentham and they moved in those utilitarian circles that included James Mill. It was the publication of the latter's "On Government" which called for the vote for men only, that aroused the fervent opposition of both Wheeler and Thompson and to the rebuttal in Appeal of One Half the Human Race.

=== Vegetarianism ===
Thompson became a non-smoker, teetotaller and vegetarian for the last 17 years of his life. These abstemious habits, he explained, helped him to concentrate on his reading and writing.

Thompson ate bread and jam for breakfast and he would lunch on potatoes and turnips. He did not eat butter or eggs but was fond of honey. Honey was produced in large quantities on his farm and Thompson supplied his workers with his favourite beverage, honey tea.

=== Influence on cooperative movement ===
==== Opposition to Robert Owen ====
Thompson and others of the Cooperative movement have tended to be somewhat unfairly subsumed under the political label of Owenism. In fact, although his writings and social experiments at New Lanark had helped to bring the cooperative movement together, many, Thompson included, were critical of Owen's authoritarian and anti-democratic tendencies. Thompson further distrusted Owen's courtship of rich and powerful patrons, believing that the rich as a class could never be expected to be in favour of any project of emancipation for the labouring poor as this would threaten their privilege. He also believed in the necessity of the workers in any co-operative community having eventual security of ownership of the community's land and capital property. He gained a considerable following within the cooperative movement for these positions and it was to distinguish themselves from Owen's positions that this wing of the movement began to adopt the label of "socialist or communionist" (Letter to "The Cooperative Magazine", London, November 1827, cited by OED as first documented use of socialist) rather than "Owenist". (Robert Owen in private correspondence uses the socialist neologism five years earlier than this in 1822)

These differences led to open confrontation between Thompson and Owen at the Third Cooperative Congress held in 1832 in London. Owen, perhaps discouraged by the failure of his attempted community at New Harmony, maintained that it was necessary to wait for Government and Stock Exchange support and investment into large scale communities. Thompson and his supporters contended that they must move towards establishing independent small scale communities based on the movement's own resources. The argument was not resolved at that congress and by the following one Thompson was unable to attend probably as a result of the illness that was to lead to his death in another five months.

=== Influence on Karl Marx and Marxists ===
Thorstein Veblen has said Marx had a "large...unacknowledged debt" to Thompson. Harold Laski remarks that Thompson "laid the foundations" for Marxism. James Connolly held Thompson in high regard saying he was an "original thinker, a pioneer of Socialist thought, superior to any of the Utopian Socialists of the Continent" who had "a merciless fidelity to truth". Herbert Foxwell believed Thompson to be "the first writer to elevate the question of the just distribution of wealth to the supreme position it has since held in English political economy. Up to his time political economy had been rather commercial than industrial".

Karl Marx had come across Thompson's work on a visit to Manchester in 1845, and cites it in passing in The Poverty of Philosophy (1847), and also in Capital itself. Thompson's "An Inquiry into the Principles of the Distribution of Wealth Most Conducive to Human Happiness; applied to the Newly Proposed System of Voluntary Equality of Wealth" is acknowledged by Marx as one of the works on political economy he studied.

== Selected publications ==
- State of the Education in the South of Ireland, 1818.
- An Inquiry into the Principles of the Distribution of Wealth Most Conducive to Human Happiness; applied to the Newly Proposed System of Voluntary Equality of Wealth, (Longman, Hurst Rees, Orme, Brown & Green: London), 1824.
- Appeal of One Half the Human Race, Women, Against the Pretensions of the Other Half, Men, to Retain Them in Political, and thence in Civil and Domestic Slavery, (Longman, Hurst Rees, Orme, Brown & Green: London), 1825.
- Labor Rewarded. The Claims of Labor and Capital Conciliated: or, How to Secure to Labor the Whole Products of Its Exertions, (Hunt and Clarke: London), 1827.
- Practical Directions for the Speedy and Economical Establishment of Communities on the Principles of Mutual Co-operation, United Possessions and Equality of Exertions and the Means of Enjoyments, (Strange and E. Wilson: London), 1830.

== See also ==
- Utopian socialism
