= Pulling (surname) =

Pulling is a surname. Notable people with the surname include:

- Abbi Pulling (born 2003), British racing driver
- James Pulling (1814–1879), British academic
- John Pulling (captain) (18th century), American army captain
- Mary Pulling (1871–1951), New Zealand headmistress
- Patricia Pulling (1948–1997), American anti-occult campaigner
