= John Pearson (judge) =

English judge

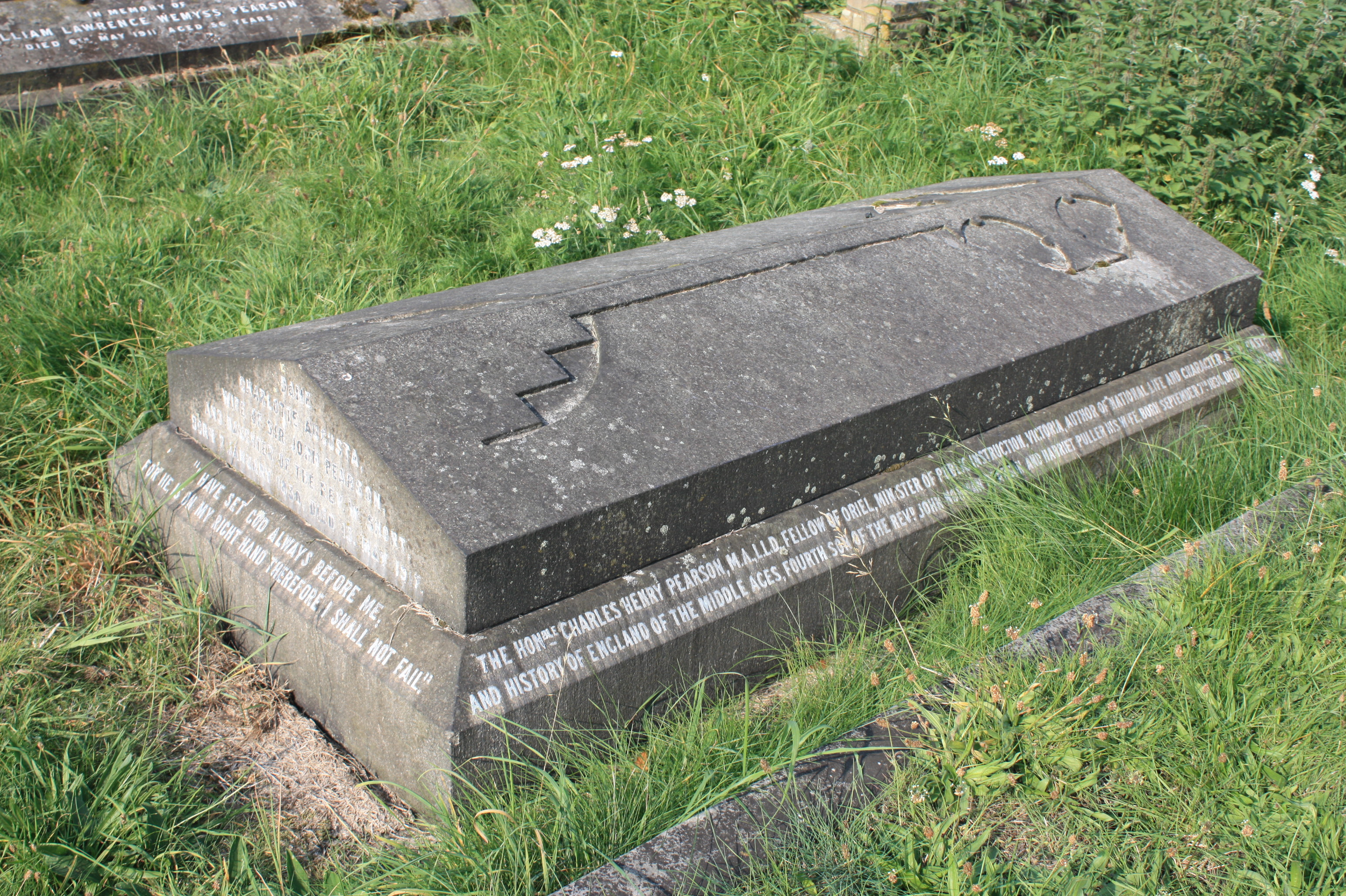
The grave of brothers John and Charles Pearson, Brompton Cemetery, London

Sir John Pearson (5 August 1819 – 13 May 1886) was an English judge.

== Life ==
Pearson studied at Gonville and Caius College, Cambridge, graduating BA in 1841, and MA in 1844, and was a called to the bar at Lincoln's Inn in 1844. He was a judge of the High Court of Justice, Chancery Division from 1882. He was also a member of the Council of Legal Education.

The eldest son of the Rev. John Norman Pearson and the brother of Charles Henry Pearson, he married Charlotte Augusta Short, daughter of Rev. William Short, late rector of St. George's, Bloomsbury, on 21 December 1854.

Pearson became QC on 15 December 1866, bencher of his inn on 11 January 1867, and was its treasurer from 1884–85. He was knighted on 30 November 1882. He is buried at London's Brompton Cemetery.

== Arms ==
Coat of arms of John Pearson
| Motto Sol Et Scutum Deus |
