= John Francis Bray =

American radical social economist (1809–1897)

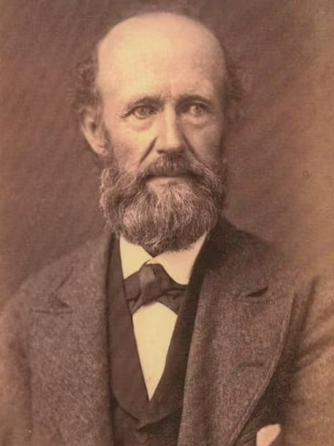
John Francis Bray

John Francis Bray (26 June 1809 – 1 February 1897) was a radical, chartist, writer on socialist economics, and activist in both Britain and his native America in the 19th century. He was hailed in later life as the "Benjamin Franklin" of American labor.

== Life ==
John Bray was born in Washington, D.C., while his father was performing with a theatrical company based in the city. Bray's father had been born into a Yorkshire family of farmers and clothiers around Huddersfield. In 1822 they moved back to the West Riding, to Leeds. But their initial plans were stymied when his father died shortly after their return. Young John was then lodged with a relative and was apprenticed into the printing trade around the West Riding. He moved back to Leeds in 1832 and worked on a local paper and became involved in the working class movement in Leeds, including the Chartist Movement, then growing in Leeds around Feargus O'Connor's Northern Star. He also helped to found the Leeds Working Men's Association in 1837 and became its first treasurer. He delivered a number of lectures to the membership from which his first pamphlet Labour's Wrongs and Labour's Remedy was drawn.

Following the repression of the first wave of the Chartist Movement in the wake of the abortive uprising attempts of 1839 and the economic depression of 1841–1842, Bray returned to the US in 1842 and became a printer in Detroit. He later moved to Pontiac, Michigan, where he began a family and later moved from printing into farming on a nearby farm. During the 1850s and 1860s he was active in the Democratic and working class movement locally and throughout the midwest. He wrote articles and lectured around the midwest opposing a range of social ills from Spiritualism to the Civil War and slavery. He supported the Socialist Labor Party and joined the Knights of Labor. As an old man he helped to shape the politics of the Populist Party of the 1890s.

== Ideas and influence ==
Bray's pamphlet Labour's Wrongs and Labour's Remedy is quoted at length by Karl Marx in his 1847 attack on Proudhon, The Poverty of Philosophy. In it Marx uses him to show the unoriginality of Proudhon's mutualist proposals. Indeed, Bray's economics are those that have somewhat controversially (see Noel Thompson reference) been ascribed to the Ricardian socialists. In short a belief that the source of employers profits is an unequal exchange with employees in which the latter is not paid the full value of their labor. The remedy then is based on creating a society of equal exchange between producers at fair value. Bray's ideas in this sense are in the tradition of market socialism.

According to French Socialist Paul Lafargue, who calls "Labour's Wrongs, and Labour's Remedy" "his remarkable work", Bray had called for the establishing of "equitable labour exchanges", not "as a solution of the social problem" but "only [as] a means of smoothing over the transition from the capitalist to the communist régime". In this he was echoing Marx's own comments on Bray in his polemic against Proudhon almost word for word. Several were started in 1840 -- "in London, Sheffield, Leeds and other towns", but "after absorbing vast capital, had gone bankrupt under scandalous circumstances."

Bray claimed that capital accumulation was the result of an unequal exchange of commodities between laborers and capitalists. This led him to criticize the system of inheritance as it existed in his time. He maintained that inheritance by individuals helped account for “the existence of large private fortunes” and that it was “an unjust case.” Bray stated that the “greater part of present capital has been inherited from preceding generations” and that instead of individual inheritance, inherited wealth should be “used for the benefit of all.” In Bray's system of equal exchange, “prices are based exclusively on labor cost of production” and “there can be neither interest nor profit.”

Bray supported the abolition of private ownership because he was critical of certain social issues—“the existence of poverty, the exploitation of the poor by the rich, [and] the dishonesty of the commercial system”—that he claimed were inherent to a system of private ownership.

== Bibliography ==
- Bray, John Francis, Labour's wrongs and labour's remedy, Leeds, England (1839).
- Bray, John Francis, Government and society considered in relation to first principles, (1842)
- Bray, John Francis, A Voyage from Utopia to Several Unknown Regions of the World, (written 1842; published posthumously)
- Bray, John Francis, The coming age devoted to the fraternisation and advancement of mankind through religious, political and social reforms. No. 1 Spiritualism founded on a fallacy, (1855)
- Bray, John Francis, No. 2 The origin of mundane and human energies unfavourable to spiritualism, (1855)
- Bray, John Francis, American destiny what shall it be? Republican or Cossack? An argument addressed to the people of the late Union North and South, (1864)
- Bray, John Francis, God and man a unity and all mankind a unity; a basis for a new dispensation social and religious, (1879)

== See also ==
- Chartism
- Market socialism
- Mutualism
- Owenism
- Ricardian socialism
