= John Pearson (cricketer) =

English cricketer

John Henry Pearson (14 May 1915 – 13 May 2007) was an English first-class cricketer, who played three matches for Yorkshire County Cricket Club from 1934 to 1936. He also appeared for the Yorkshire Second XI between 1933 and 1936.

Born in Scarborough, Yorkshire, England, Pearson was a right-handed batsman, who scored 54 runs with a best of 44 against Northamptonshire. He also appeared against Derbyshire and Kent. In all first-class matches he averaged 18.00. He did not bowl or take a catch in the field.

Pearson died aged 91, in May 2007
