= Christopher Puller =

English lawyer

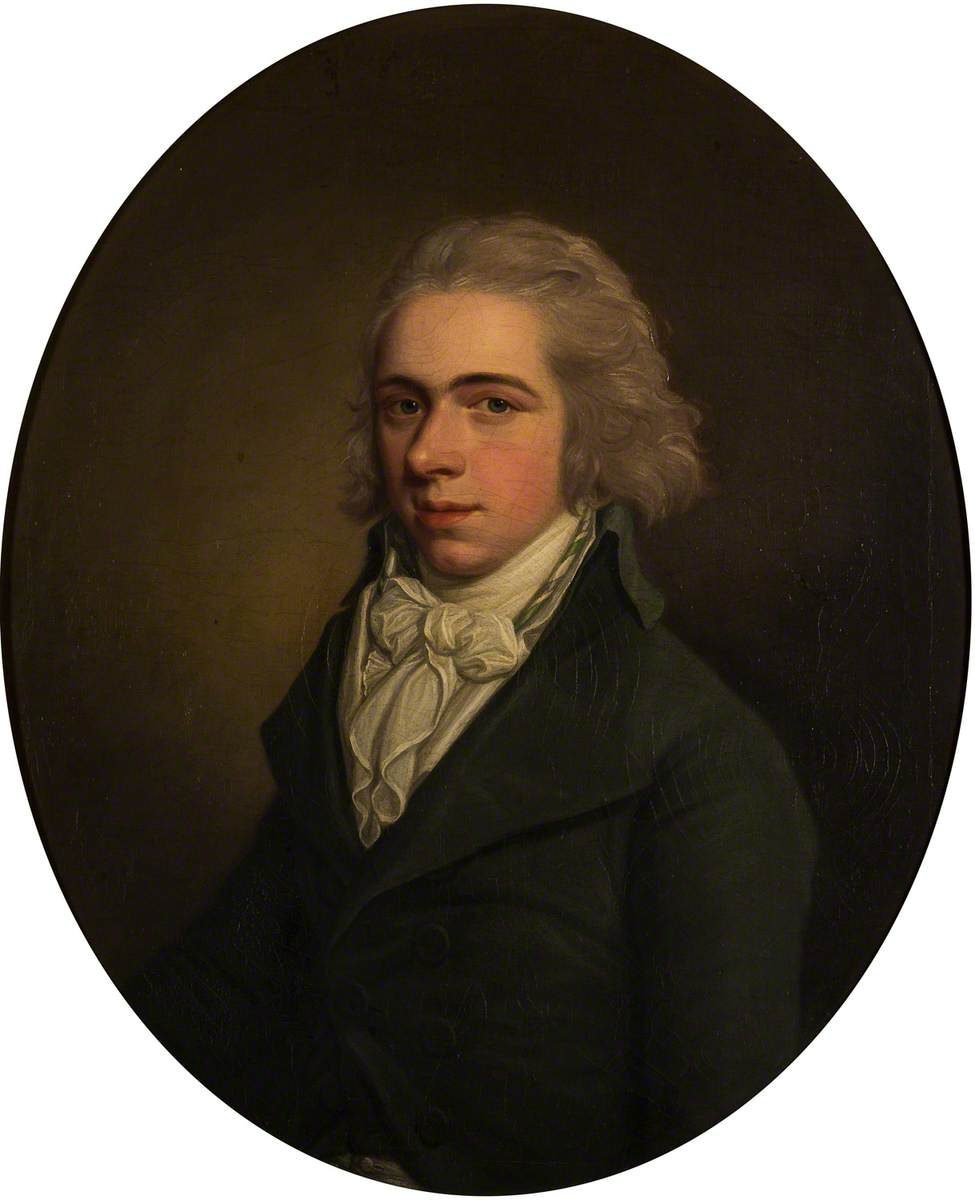
- Portrait of Puller circa 1809, by John Francis Rigaud
- Born: 1774
- Died: 26 May 1824 (aged 49–50)
- Education: Christ Church, Oxford; Inner Temple
- Occupations: Lawyer and judge
- Children: Christopher William Puller
- Father: Richard Puller

Sir Christopher Puller (1774 – 26 May 1824) was an English lawyer who was briefly Chief Justice of Bengal.

== Life ==
He was born the son of London merchant Richard Puller and educated at Eton and Christ Church, Oxford, where he graduated B.A. in 1795, and was elected a fellow of Oriel College. He studied law at the Inner Temple and was called to the bar in 1800. He then moved in 1812 to Lincoln's Inn, where he was elected a bencher in 1822.

He appeared for the prosecution in the 1812 trial of William Booth for forgery. Booth was sentenced to hang.

In his early career Puller worked as a law reporter with Sir Justice John Bernard Bosanquet. In 1823 he accepted the post of Chief Justice at the Supreme Court of Judicature at Fort William, Calcutta and received the customary knighthood. However, like his predecessor Sir Robert Henry Blosset, he died there within a few months of starting his judicial duties.

== Family ==
Puller married Louisa King, daughter of Joseph King of Taplow, and niece of Daniel Giles of Youngsbury, Hertfordshire. Christopher William Puller, Member of Parliament for Hertfordshire, was their son.
