= John Pearson (footballer, born 1892) =

Scottish footballer (1892–1937)

Personal information
- Full name: John Pearson
- Date of birth: 22 January 1892
- Place of birth: Arbroath, Scotland
- Date of death: 13 April 1937 (aged 45)
- Place of death: Arbroath, Scotland
- Height: 5 ft 10 in (1.78 m)
- Position: Left back

Senior career*
Years	Team	Apps	(Gls)
- Arbroath Fairfield
- Arbroath
1914–1923	Tottenham Hotspur	47	(0)
1918	→ Partick Thistle (loan)	6	(0)
1923	Luton Town	1	(0)
- * Club domestic league appearances and goals

John Pearson (22 January 1892 – 13 April 1937) was a Scottish professional footballer who played as a left back in the Football League for Tottenham Hotspur and Luton Town. He also played in his native Scotland for Arbroath and Partick Thistle.

== Career ==
Pearson began his career with his hometown club Arbroath. In 1914, the left back moved to England to join First Division club Tottenham Hotspur, for whom he played a total of 51 matches in all competitions between 1914 and 1923. Pearson signed for Luton Town in 1923 and made one league appearance before ending his playing career.

== Personal life ==
Pearson served in the Royal Navy during the First World War.

== Career statistics ==
Appearances and goals by club, season and competition
Club	Season	League			National Cup		Total	
Club	Season	Division	Apps	Goals	Apps	Goals	Apps	Goals
Tottenham Hotspur	1914–15	First Division	17	0	2	0	19	0
Tottenham Hotspur	1919–20	Second Division	21	0	0	0	21	0
Tottenham Hotspur	1920–21	First Division	5	0	0	0	5	0
Tottenham Hotspur	1921–22	First Division	3	0	0	0	3	0
Tottenham Hotspur	1922–23	First Division	1	0	2	0	3	0
Tottenham Hotspur	Total		47	0	4	0	51	0
Partick Thistle (loan)	1918–19	Scottish First Division	6	0	—		6	0
Luton Town	1923–24	Third Division South	1	0	0	0	1	0
Career total			54	0	4	0	58	0
