= He who does not work, neither shall he eat =

New Testament aphorism

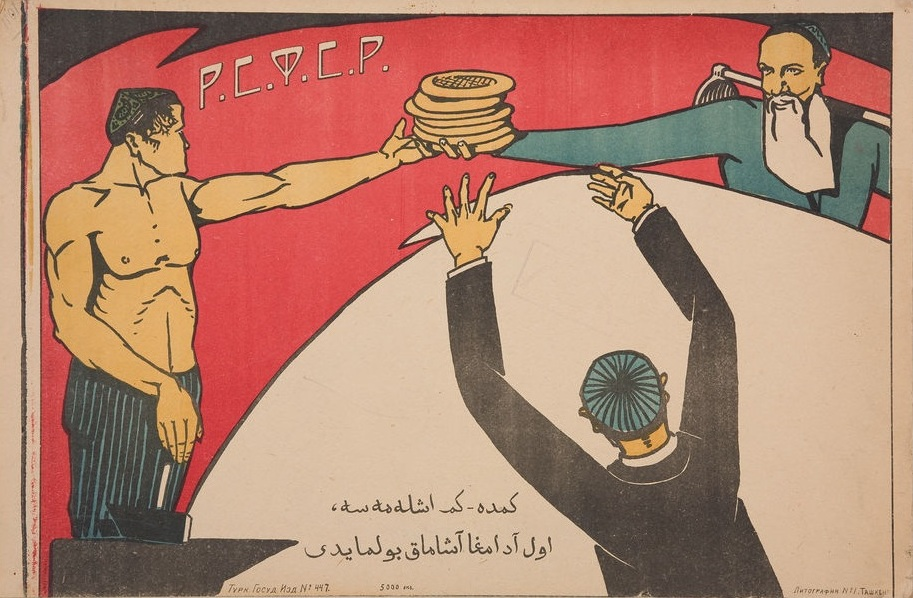
"He who doesn't work, doesn't eat" – Soviet poster issued in Uzbekistan, 1920

"He who does not work, neither shall he eat" is an aphorism from the New Testament traditionally attributed to Paul the Apostle. It was later cited by John Smith in the early 1600s colony of Jamestown, Virginia, and broadly by the international socialist movement, from the United States to the communist revolutionary Vladimir Lenin during the early 1900s Russian Revolution. The Chan master Baizhang is also well-known for telling his monks a similar aphorism: "A day without work is a day without food" (Chinese: 一日不做一日不食; pinyin: yīrì bù zuò yīrì bù shí; lit. 'One day not work, one day not eat').

== New Testament ==
The aphorism is found in the Second Epistle to the Thessalonians 3:10, the authorship of which is traditionally assigned to Paul the Apostle (with Silvanus and Timothy), rendered in the New Revised Standard Version as:

10 For even when we were with you, we gave you this command: Anyone unwilling to work should not eat. 11 For we hear that some of you are living in idleness, mere busybodies, not doing any work. 12 Now such persons we command and exhort in the Lord Jesus Christ to do their work quietly and to earn their own living.

The Greek phrase οὐ θέλει ἐργᾰ́ζεσθαι (ou thélei ergázesthai) means "is not willing to work". Other English translations render this as "would" or "will not work", using the archaic sense of "want to, desire to" for the verb "will". There is a Jewish proverb, "that if a man would not work, he should not eat". Also:

he that labours on the evening of the sabbath (or on weekdays), he shall eat on the sabbath day; and he who does not labour on the evening of the sabbath, from whence shall he eat (or what right and authority has he to eat) on the sabbath day?

== Jamestown ==
In the spring of 1609, John Smith cited the aphorism to the colonists of Jamestown:

Countrymen, the long experience of our late miseries I hope is sufficient to persuade everyone to a present correction of himself, And think not that either my pains nor the adventurers' purses will ever maintain you in idleness and sloth...

...the greater part must be more industrious, or starve...

You must obey this now for a law, that he that will not work shall not eat (except by sickness he be disabled). For the labors of thirty or forty honest and industrious men shall not be consumed to maintain a hundred and fifty idle loiterers.

== Soviet Union ==
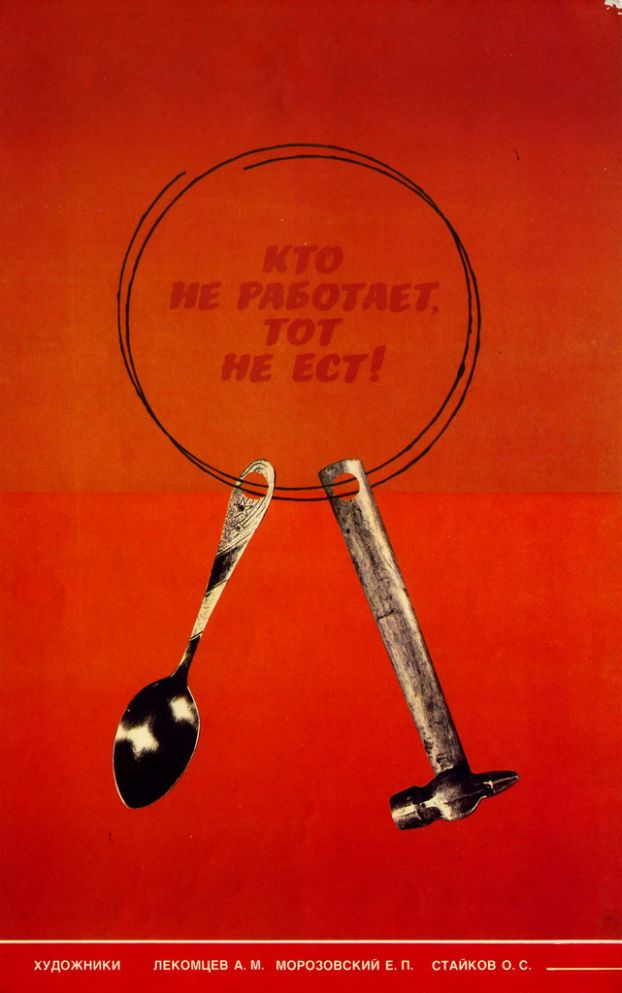
The motto in a 1920s Soviet poster

According to Vladimir Lenin, "He who does not work shall not eat" is a necessary principle under socialism, the preliminary phase of the evolution towards communist society. The phrase appears in his 1917 work The State and Revolution. Through this slogan Lenin explains that in socialist states only productive individuals could be allowed access to the articles of consumption.

The socialist principle, "He who does not work shall not eat", is already realized; the other socialist principle, "An equal amount of products for an equal amount of labor", is also already realized. But this is not yet communism, and it does not yet abolish "bourgeois law", which gives unequal individuals, in return for unequal (really unequal) amounts of labor, equal amounts of products. This is a "defect" according to Marx, but it is unavoidable in the first phase of communism; for if we are not to indulge in utopianism, we must not think that having overthrown capitalism people will at once learn to work for society without any rules of law. (Chapter 5, Section 3, "The First Phase of Communist Society")

In Lenin's writing, this was directed at the bourgeoisie, as well as "those who shirk their work".

During the famine of the Russian Civil War, Lenin wrote the following as to the practical measures taken under the principle:

It is as clear as daylight that in order to put it into effect we require, first, a state grain monopoly, i.e., the absolute prohibition of all private trade in grain, the compulsory delivery of all surplus grain to the state at a fixed price, the absolute prohibition of all hoarding and concealment of surplus grain, no matter by whom. Secondly, we require the strictest registration of all grain surpluses, faultless organisation of the transportation of grain from places of abundance to places of shortage, and the building up of reserves for consumption, for processing, and for seed. Thirdly, we require a just and proper distribution of bread, controlled by the workers’ state, the proletarian state, among all the citizens of the state, a distribution which will permit of no privileges and advantages for the rich.

The principle was enunciated in the Russian Constitution of 1918, and also article twelve of the 1936 Soviet Constitution:

In the USSR work is a duty and a matter of honor for every able-bodied citizen, in accordance with the principle: "He who does not work, neither shall he eat".

Joseph Stalin quoted Lenin during the Soviet famine of 1930–1933, declaring: "He who does not work, neither shall he eat." This perspective is argued by economics professor Michael Ellman to have influenced official policy during the famine, with those deemed to be idlers being disfavored in aid distribution as compared to those deemed "conscientiously working collective farmers"; in this vein, Olga Andriewsky states that Soviet archives indicate that aid in Ukraine was primarily distributed to preserve the collective farm system and only the most productive workers were prioritized for receiving it. Criticizing Stalin, Leon Trotsky wrote: "The old principle: who does not work shall not eat, has been replaced with a new one: who does not obey shall not eat."

== See also ==
- Critique of work
- From each according to his ability, to each according to his needs
- No such thing as a free lunch
- To each according to his contribution
- Monasticism
- Workfare
