= Ricardian socialism =

Socialist tendency of the 1820s–1840s

Ricardian socialism is a branch of socialist thought that developed in Great Britain between the 1820s and 1840s. Its proponents drew on David Ricardo's economic theories, primarily the labor theory of value, to argue for a socialist critique of capitalism. They contended that because labor is the source of all value, the entire product of labor should belong to the laborer. The profits, rent, and interest collected by capitalists, landlords, and lenders were therefore considered "unearned incomes" unjustly taken from the workers. Though labeled "Ricardian," these thinkers did not form a cohesive school and often drew their ideas more directly from Adam Smith's formulation of the labor theory of value; the term reflects Ricardo's status as the dominant economist of the era in which their ideas flourished.

The most prominent Ricardian socialists were William Thompson, John Gray, Thomas Hodgskin, and John Francis Bray. They wrote during a period of significant social and economic turmoil in Britain following the Napoleonic Wars and the height of the Industrial Revolution, with their work providing an intellectual counterpart to the era's widespread movements for political and economic reform. The Ricardian socialists are seen as a transitional group between earlier utopian socialism and the later "scientific socialism" of Karl Marx, who studied their works. They combined the Utopian belief in peaceful, rational reform with a new emphasis on economic analysis, laying the groundwork for subsequent socialist theories of exploitation and the economic interpretation of history.

== Historical context ==
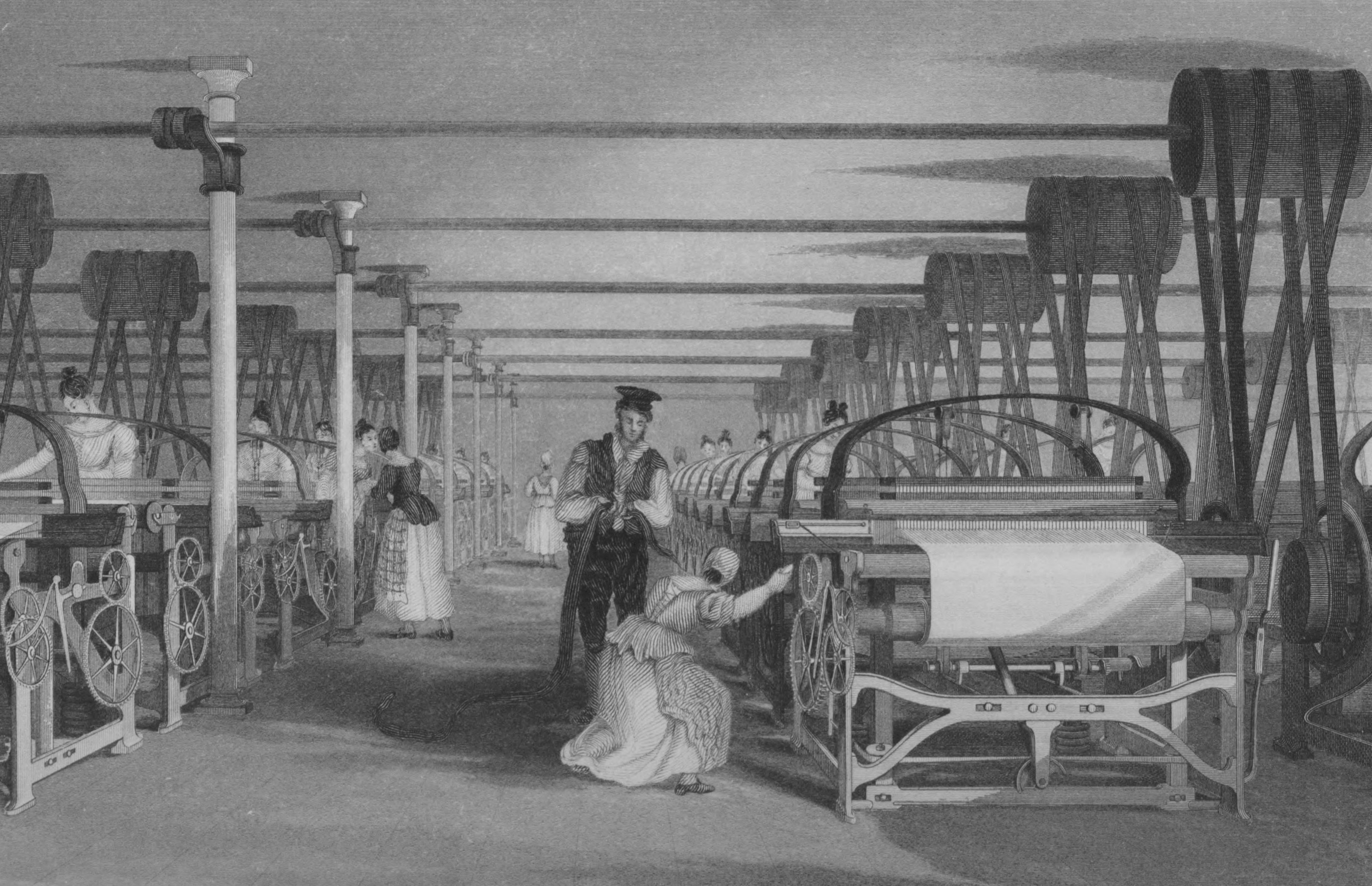
Depiction of power loom weaving in a British cotton mill, 1835

The first half of the 19th century in England was a period of intense focus on political and economic problems. The era saw major legislative reforms, including the repeal of the Combination Acts in 1824–25, the Reform Act 1832, the reform of the Poor Laws in 1834, and the repeal of the Corn Laws in 1846. These events were accompanied by widespread public debate and agitation, as well as investigations into factory conditions and prisons.

This "reforming energy" was fueled by the economic conditions that followed the peace of 1815. The end of the Napoleonic Wars brought a severe economic downturn to Britain's young and rapidly expanding industrial economy. The Industrial Revolution had transformed Britain from a farming to a manufacturing nation, but the post-war period was marked by a prolonged depression. Walter Bagehot noted that "for the thirty years succeeding the peace of 1815 England was always uncomfortable: trade was bad, employment scarce." These harsh conditions, combined with inhuman factory hours and working conditions, produced a generation of radical thinkers. While classical economists advocated for laissez-faire reforms, a counter-agitation emerged for communism and socialistic reorganization, inspired in part by the writings of the Ricardian socialists.

== Core principles ==
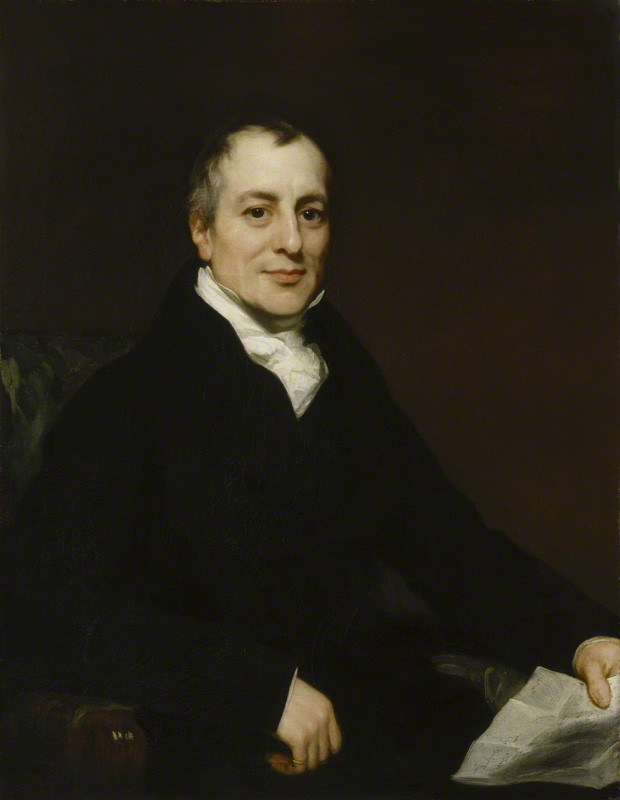
David Ricardo

The Ricardian socialists were not a formal school of thought, but they shared a common line of economic reasoning that formed the basis of their social criticism. Although later scholarship labeled them "Ricardian," they primarily cited Adam Smith as the authority for their core economic principle, the labor theory of value. The term "Ricardian socialism" arose because David Ricardo was the most prominent figure in the classical school of economics where this theory was a central doctrine.

Their argument began with the premise that labor is the source of all wealth. As William Thompson stated, "Wealth is produced by labor: no other ingredient but labor makes any object of desire an object of wealth." From this, they derived their central ethical claim: the right of the laborer to the whole produce of their labor. They used this claim to analyze the existing distribution of wealth under capitalism. They concluded that the incomes of landlords and capitalists—rent, profit, and interest—were deductions from the produce of labor. These "unearned incomes" were viewed as an "exploitation" of the working class. Thomas Hodgskin argued, for instance, that "Capital is the product of labour, and profit is nothing but a portion of that produce, uncharitably exacted for permitting the labourer to consume a part of what he has himself produced." This economic argument formed the foundation of their critique of the existing social order and their proposals for a more just society.

The Ricardian socialists' engagement with Ricardo's system was often selective. They embraced the raw principle that labor determines value but largely ignored the complex qualifications Ricardo had introduced. For example, they did not address his admission that capital intensity affects prices or his detailed analysis of rent as a differential surplus. They also unanimously repudiated the Malthusian theory of population, which was a cornerstone of Ricardo's pessimistic outlook on the long-term prospects for the laboring class.

== Economic doctrines ==
=== Theory of exploitation ===
While the Ricardian socialists' critique of capitalism was fundamentally a moral one, it was built upon a developing economic theory of exploitation. They went beyond the simple assertion of the worker's right to their full produce and attempted to analyze the economic mechanics of how that produce was taken from them. They reframed profit, rent, and interest not merely as unjust deductions, but as the result of the appropriation of "surplus labor"—the labor performed by a worker beyond what is necessary to cover their own subsistence.

The earliest clear statement of this concept came from the proto-socialist writer Charles Hall in 1805, who calculated that the working class received the value of only one hour's work out of every eight. The Ricardian socialists built on this foundation. An anonymous 1821 pamphlet, The Source and Remedy of the National Difficulties, argued that capitalists can only receive the "surplus labour of the labourer." Thompson used the term "surplus value" to describe the additional value produced by labor that was extracted by capital. Thomas Rowe Edmonds made a clear distinction between the "necessary" labor required for a worker's subsistence and the "surplus" labor which generates the income of the non-productive classes. The socialists even made ambitious, if inconsistent, attempts to quantify this rate of exploitation. Hall estimated it at 700%, Piercy Ravenstone at 400%, and John Gray at 400%, while John Francis Bray suggested rates between 20% and 100%.

=== Theories of capital, crisis, and history ===
The Ricardian socialists reconceptualized capital as a social relationship rather than a mere physical stock of tools and machinery. Hall and Hodgskin, for example, argued that capital's power came not from its physical nature but from its ability to command the labor of others. Hodgskin went further, anticipating Marx's theory of the fetishism of commodities by arguing that classical economics incorrectly attributed productive power to capital itself, which he saw as an inanimate object, rather than to the social labor that creates and uses it. They also developed an early form of underconsumptionist crisis theory. They rejected Say's law, arguing that the poverty of the working masses, who were paid less than the full value of their labor, created a "limit to production" by restricting effective demand. This, they argued, led to periodic market gluts and economic crises.

Methodologically, the Ricardian socialists broke with the classical school by treating the laws of capitalism as historically specific rather than as universal natural laws. Hodgskin, for instance, argued that the classical economists' pessimistic conclusions were based on social institutions, like private property, which they wrongly assumed to be "natural." Some of the socialists also developed an early form of historical materialism. Thompson and Edmonds outlined a historical progression of economic systems, from slave labor, through the current stage of individual competition, to a future of mutual cooperation. They viewed capitalism as a necessary and progressive, though transient, stage in human development.

== Key figures ==
The four most prominent writers identified as Ricardian socialists are William Thompson, John Gray, Thomas Hodgskin, and John Francis Bray. However, the group is often defined more broadly to include other writers who were critical of capitalism and influenced by classical political economy, such as Charles Hall, Piercy Ravenstone, and Thomas Rowe Edmonds.

=== William Thompson ===
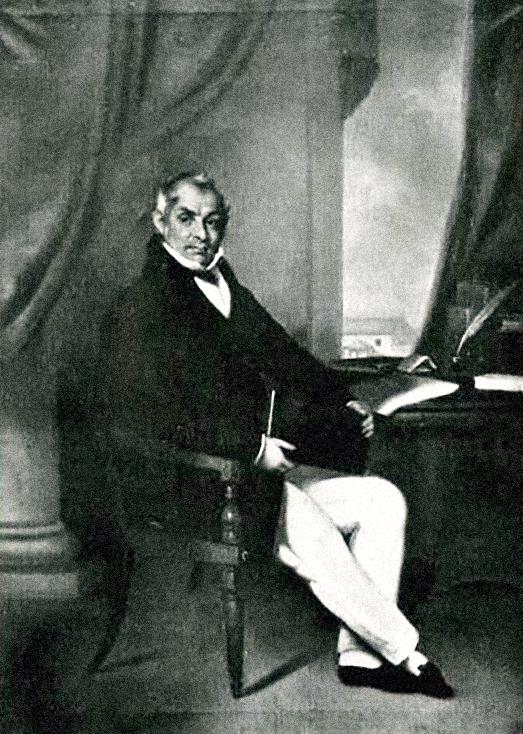
William Thompson

William Thompson (1775–1833) was an Irish landowner, philosopher, and social reformer who sought to establish a "social science" focused on promoting human happiness, in contrast to what he saw as the narrow focus of political economy on the accumulation of wealth. Influenced by both Jeremy Bentham's utilitarianism and Robert Owen's communitarianism, Thompson's work aimed to reconcile the seemingly contradictory principles of individual security and social equality. His major work, An Inquiry into the Principles of the Distribution of Wealth Most Conducive to Human Happiness (1824), was written to counter the argument that social inequality was a necessary good.

Thompson used Bentham's "greatest happiness principle" to analyze systems of distribution. He argued that since all individuals have a similar capacity for happiness, an equal distribution of wealth would "maximize" total social happiness, provided it did not undermine the incentive to produce. He contrasted the existing system of "insecurity," where wealth is taken from its producers by "forced abstraction," with a system of "security," where every laborer receives the whole produce of their labor. While he saw the right to the whole produce of labor as the "strongest stimulus to production," he identified several "deterrent evils" in a competitive system based on this principle, including the promotion of selfishness, the wastefulness of individual family arrangements, and the lack of protection against sickness and old age. Ultimately, he advocated for a system of voluntary communism, as practiced in Owenite communities, where social security and equality would replace individual competition. According to historian Esther Lowenthal, Thompson's socialism was primarily Utopian, based on a faith in human perfectibility, with economic analysis serving as an adjunct to his ethical and philosophical arguments.

=== John Gray ===
John Gray (c. 1799–1883) was a writer and economist who, after a brief involvement with Owen's communistic colony at Orbiston, developed his own distinct socialist theory. His early work, A Lecture on Human Happiness (1825), was deeply socialistic in tone, asserting that "The foundation of all property is Labour, and there is no other just foundation for it." Gray used the statistical work of Patrick Colquhoun to argue that the "productive classes" received only about one-fifth of the wealth they created, with the rest being absorbed by unproductive landlords and capitalists.

Gray's primary critique was directed at competition and the existing system of exchange. He argued that competition was a "tremendous engine of mischief" that created social waste and prevented production from meeting the needs of society. His central thesis was that production was limited by demand, a problem he attributed to a flawed monetary system that failed to provide an adequate medium of exchange. To remedy this, he proposed a "Social System" detailed in his 1831 book of the same name. His plan involved the creation of a national bank that would issue a paper currency based on labor time. Producers would deposit their goods in national warehouses and receive a sum in this currency equivalent to the labor value of their products, thus ensuring that production would create its own demand. Although Gray later in life repudiated the socialist label and framed his work as a mere monetary reform, Lowenthal notes that his system was functionally a form of state socialism, as it involved state control of industry, the elimination of profit and interest, and a wage and price system based on the labor theory of value.

=== Thomas Hodgskin ===
Thomas Hodgskin (1787–1869) was a former naval officer turned writer and journalist who became an ardent defender of individual liberty and laissez-faire economics. Unlike the other Ricardian socialists, his political philosophy was one of extreme individualism, verging on anarchism. He believed in a natural social order governed by harmonious laws and saw government intervention as a primary cause of social ills.

Despite his individualist stance, Hodgskin's economic writings contained a sharp socialist critique of property and profit. In Labour Defended against the Claims of Capital (1825), he applied the labor theory of value to argue that capital is unproductive. He maintained that what is commonly called "capital" is not a stored-up fund of subsistence but a continuous flow of goods produced by co-existing labor. Fixed capital, like machinery, he argued, is lifeless; it is the co-acting labor that creates value. Therefore, the profits and interest collected by capitalists were an unjust exaction from laborers, a claim made possible only by an "artificial" system of property laws that violated the "natural" right of laborers to their produce. Hodgskin was a significant critic of the wages-fund doctrine, arguing that wages are paid from the current product of labor, not from a pre-accumulated fund. However, he was not a collectivist; he believed that a truly free market, with property based on natural rights, would allow labor to receive its just reward through the "higgling of the market." Lowenthal concludes that Hodgskin was less a socialist than an individualist anarchist whose economic arguments aligned with socialist critiques of capital.

=== John Francis Bray ===
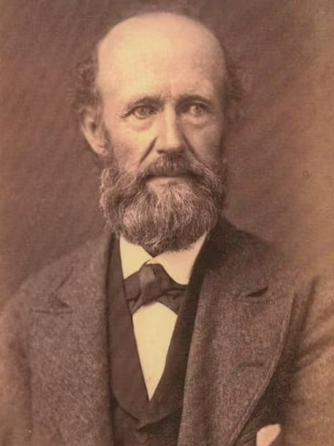
John Francis Bray

John Francis Bray (1809–1897) was a journeyman printer whose work, Labour's Wrongs and Labour's Remedy (1839), represents a synthesis of socialist ideas from the period. He is regarded by Lowenthal as a key "transitional" figure, connecting the Utopian tradition with the emerging "scientific" socialism. Bray combined the Utopian insistence on the equality of man, derived from a philosophy of natural rights, with an economic interpretation of society that anticipates Karl Marx. He argued that the "institution of property as it at present exists" was the root of all social wrong and that political inequality was merely a consequence of economic inequality.

Bray's economic theory centered on the idea of "unequal exchanges." He argued that capitalists and proprietors accumulate wealth by defrauding laborers in the exchange process. They pay workers less than the value of their labor and then sell the products of that labor at their full value, creating a system where laborers receive only "a part of the wealth which they obtained from him the week before!" His remedy was a social system based on "equal exchanges," where goods and services would be priced according to their true labor cost. He proposed a societal structure of allied joint-stock companies governed by elected boards of trade, where all workers would receive a uniform wage for equal hours of labor. He envisioned a peaceful transition to this new order, whereby the productive classes, organized by trade, would use a state-issued paper currency to purchase all the means of production from their private owners.

== Legacy and influence ==
=== Utopian socialism ===
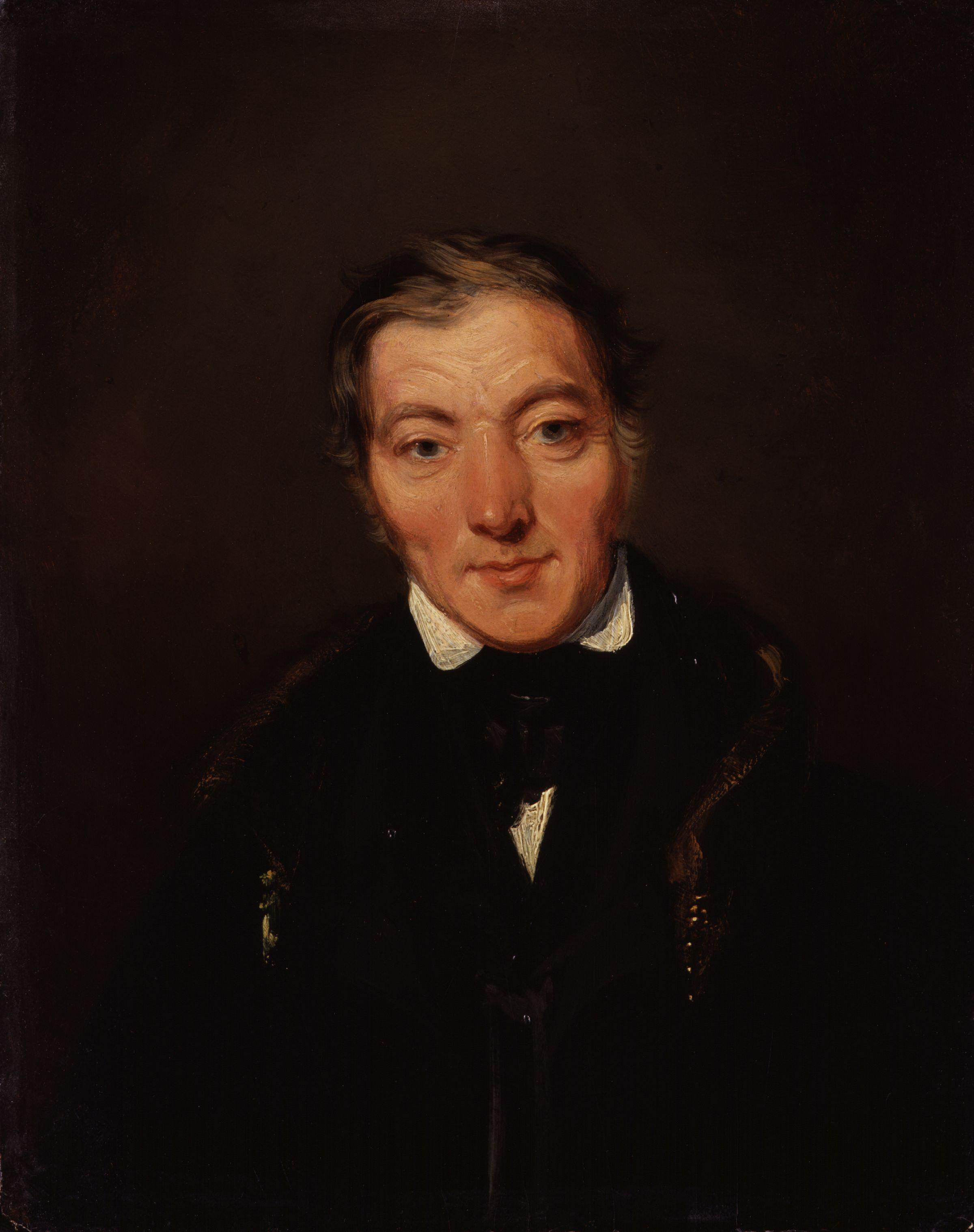
Robert Owen

The Ricardian socialists carried on the tradition of Utopian socialism, sharing its belief in the perfectibility of human nature and the power of reason to shape a just society. With the exception of the individualist Hodgskin, they were heavily influenced by the ideas of Robert Owen. Like the Utopians, they believed in peaceful, voluntary change and expected that the new social order could be created immediately through educational campaigns and the establishment of model communities. Thompson's advocacy of Owenite communism and Gray's detailed plans for a new social and monetary system are characteristic of this Utopian tendency to design ideal future societies. Their key contribution was to supplement this idealistic framework with a new foundation: the economic argument. They were the first in the English socialist tradition to base their critique of society on an analysis of economic phenomena like value and distribution.

=== Influence on and critique by Marx and Engels ===
Karl Marx

The Ricardian socialists are considered important forerunners of Karl Marx and Friedrich Engels. Marx studied their writings, beginning in the mid-1840s, and built upon many of their ideas. They anticipated Marx in their theory of exploitation as the appropriation of surplus labor, their analysis of capital as a social relationship, their critique of the classical school's "natural laws," and their rudimentary historical materialism. Marx's early writings on economic crises in 1847, for example, drew heavily on John Francis Bray's underconsumptionist arguments.

The standard Marxist assessment of the group, however, was largely dismissive. In works like Anti-Dühring and his preface to The Poverty of Philosophy, Engels characterized them as "utopians" who offered a merely moralistic critique of capitalism. He argued that because they based their socialism on an ethical appeal to justice, rather than an analysis of the laws of capitalist development, their ideas were an "application of morality to economics" and therefore unscientific.

Later scholarship has argued that Engels's summary did not fully represent Marx's own, more nuanced engagement with the Ricardian socialists. In his mature economic writings, particularly the Grundrisse and Theories of Surplus Value, Marx engaged extensively with their work and was often complimentary. He praised Hodgskin for his "admirable work" in revealing the fetishism of capital and credited Ravenstone and the anonymous author of the 1821 pamphlet for being among the first to identify surplus value as surplus labor. While Marx criticized them for failing to develop a complete theory of value or to understand the historical necessity of capitalism, he clearly saw them as having made significant theoretical advances over the classical economists. Because they combined Utopian methods with economic critiques that were later central to Marxism, Lowenthal characterizes the group as "transitional between the Utopian and Marxian schools."

== See also ==
- Free-market anarchism
- Mutualism
- Market socialism
- Piero Sraffa
- Ricardian economics
- Socialist economics
