= Thomas Hodgskin =

British writer (1787–1869)

- Born: 12 December 1787; Chatham, Kent, England
- Died: 21 August 1869 (aged 81); Feltham, Middlesex, England
- Citizenship: British

Academic background
- Influences: John Locke, Jean-Baptiste Say, Adam Smith

Academic work
- Discipline: Political economy

Thomas Hodgskin (12 December 1787 – 21 August 1869) was an English socialist writer on political economy, critic of capitalism and defender of free trade and early trade unions.

== Biography ==
Hodgskin's father, who worked at the British Admiralty dock stores, enrolled him in the navy at the age of 12. Coming into conflict with the naval discipline of the time, Hodgskin was retired by the Navy at the age of 25. Publication of his Essay on Naval Discipline brought Hodgskin to the attention of radicals such as Francis Place.

Entering the University of Edinburgh for study, Hodgskin later came to London and entered the utilitarian circle around Place, Jeremy Bentham and James Mill. With their support, he spent the next five years in a programme of travel and study around Europe. In 1815 Hodgskin travelled in France and Germany, experiences which he documented in his Travels in the North of Germany (1820). He married Eliza Hegewesch in Edinburgh in 1819.

In 1823, Hodgskin joined forces with Joseph Clinton Robertson in founding the Mechanics Magazine. In the October 1823 edition of the Mechanics Magazine, Hodgskin and Francis Place wrote a manifesto for a Mechanics Institute.

His main works were Labour defended against the claims of Capital (1825) and the four lectures collected as Popular Political Economy (1827). Hodgskin's assertion of the right of workers to the whole produce of their labour was influential but gave rise to his estrangement from his previous supporters, Mill denouncing it as "mad nonsense" which amounted to "the subversion of civilised society".

Hodgskin retreated into the realm of Whig journalism after the Reform Act 1832. He had a family of seven children to support. He advocated free trade and was economics editor for The Economist from 1843 to 1857.

In 1848 Hodgskin was also an editorial writer on Herbert Ingram's London Telegraph, where he advocated "Free Trade in the enlarged sense" in all fields of life and denounced what he characterised as "the bureaucracy": "a sordid set of self-willed men associated together, and armed, to obtain their own selfish ends and object, under the name of government".

From 1855 to April 1857 Hodgskin published a series of articles setting out his views on the criminal system in The Economist which led to the magazine's proprietor, James Wilson, breaking with him. Hodgskin then developed his theme in two lectures at St Martin's Hall.

== Legacy ==
Hodgskin was a pioneer of anti-capitalism, individualist anarchism and libertarian socialism. His criticism of employers’ appropriation of the lion's share of the value produced by their employees went on to influence subsequent generations of socialists, including Karl Marx.

In his 1832 treatise, The Natural and Artificial Right of Property Contrasted, Thomas Hodgskin extended David Ricardo's theory of rent into a comprehensive critique of capital. While Ricardo identified land as an unearned deduction from the produce of labor, Hodgskin argued that "artificial" property rights allowed capitalists to claim a similar unearned share of production. He distinguished between "natural" rights, where labor entitles the producer to their full product, and "artificial" rights created by legislation that favors capital owners. This distinction allowed Hodgskin to characterize interest and profit as "legalized robbery" analogous to land rent. Unlike later socialist thinkers, Hodgskin maintained a commitment to free-market competition, arguing that the elimination of state-enforced monopolies would naturally align property distribution with labor contribution. His work served as a critical transition from classical Ricardian economics to the "Ricardian Socialist" tradition, influencing subsequent debates on the ethical foundations of property and economic inequality.
