= John Roberts (disambiguation) =

John Roberts (born 1955) is the 17th Chief Justice of the United States.

John Roberts also commonly refers to:

- John Roberts (journalist) (born 1956), Fox News national correspondent, former CNN and CBS News television journalist and former Canadian music television host
- John Roberts (actor) (born 1971), American actor and comedian

John Roberts may also refer to:

== Politicians and government officials ==
- General John Roberts (fl. 1604), MP for Chippenham
- John Roberts (Denbigh MP) (after 1672–1731), Member of Parliament for Denbigh, 1710–1713 & 1715–1722
- John S. Roberts, signer of the Texas Declaration of Independence
- John Roberts (Flint MP) (1835–1894), Welsh member of parliament
- John Roberts, 1st Baron Clwyd (1863–1955), Welsh Liberal politician, son of the above
- John Roberts (Canadian politician) (1933–2007)
- John Roberts (mayor) (1845–1934), mayor of Dunedin, New Zealand, 1889–90
- John Bryn Roberts (1843–1931), Welsh lawyer, judge and Liberal politician
- John Mackintosh Roberts (1840–1928), New Zealand soldier, resident magistrate and administrator

== Academics ==
- John Milton Roberts (1916–1990), American anthropologist
- John D. Roberts (1918–2016), professor of chemistry at the California Institute of Technology
- J. M. Roberts (1928–2003), Oxford historian and author
- Donald John Roberts (1945–2026), or John Roberts, professor of economics at the Business School of Stanford University
- John Cole Roberts (1935–2016), Welsh geologist, senior lecturer at University of Ulster
- John Keith Roberts (1897–1944), Australian physicist
- John Roberts (philosopher) (born 1955), British philosopher of art

== Businessmen ==
- John Roberts (Australian businessman) (1934–2006), founder of Australian construction firm Multiplex
- John Roberts (British businessman) (born 1973), founder of AO World
- John P. Roberts (1945–2001), producer who bankrolled the Woodstock Festival
- John S. Roberts, president of F. W. Woolworth Company

== Military ==
- Bartholomew Roberts (1682–1722), born John Roberts, Welsh pirate
- John Walter Roberts (1792–1845), Royal Navy captain
- John Hamilton Roberts (1881–1962), Canadian Army two-star general
- John Q. Roberts (1914–1942), US Navy officer, pilot, and Navy Cross recipient
- John W. Roberts (1921–1999), US Air Force four-star general
- John Roberts (Royal Navy officer) (1924–2025), British admiral

== Television personalities ==
- John Roberts (sportscaster) (born 1965), American television host specializing in motorsports

== Music ==
- John Roberts (electronic musician), American electronic musician
- John Roberts (musician) (1944–2025), English performer of English and North Atlantic folk music and dance
- John Roberts (born 1952), former drummer for the Shadows of Knight
- John Roberts, music educator for International Association for Jazz Education
- John Storm Roberts (1936–2009), British-born, U.S.-based ethnomusicologist, writer and record producer

== Sportsmen ==
=== Association football (soccer) ===
- John Roberts (footballer, born 1857) (1857–?), Welsh international footballer
- John Roberts (footballer, born 1858) (1858–?), Welsh international footballer
- John Roberts (footballer, born 1885) (1885–19??), English footballer who played for Wolverhampton Wanderers and Bristol Rovers
- John Roberts (footballer, born 1887) (1887–19??), English-born footballer active in Italy for Milan and Modena
- John Roberts (footballer, born 1891) (1891–19??), Scottish footballer
- John Roberts (footballer, born 1944), Australian international soccer player who played in The Football League in the 1960s and 70s
- John Roberts (footballer, born 1946) (1946–2016), Welsh international footballer who played for Wrexham and Arsenal

=== Cricket ===
- John Roberts (Lancashire cricketer) (1933–2019), English cricketer
- John Roberts (Somerset cricketer) (born 1949), English cricketer

=== Other sports ===
- John Roberts Jr. (billiards player) (1847–1919), professional player of English billiards
- John Roberts (footballer, born 1881) (1881–1956), Australian rules footballer who played for South Melbourne
- John Roberts (hurler) (1895–1987), Irish hurler
- John Roberts (rugby union) (1906–1965), Welsh rugby player
- John Roberts (American football) (1920–2012), American football, wrestling and track coach
- John Roberts (rower) (born 1953), British Olympic rower
- John Roberts (footballer, born 1956), Australian rules footballer who played for South Melbourne/Sydney Swans and in South Australia

== Clergymen ==
- Saint John Roberts (martyr) (1577–1610), Welsh Benedictine monk
- John Roberts (1767–1834), Welsh divine
- John Roberts (Vicar of Tremeirchion) (1775–1829), Welsh Anglican priest and writer
- John Roberts (1804–1884), Welsh writer and independent minister
- Saint John Roberts (missionary) (1853–1949), Welsh Anglican priest, writer and missionary in Wyoming, US
- John Roberts (Presbyterian) (1880–1959), Welsh Presbyterian Church of Wales minister and historian
- John Roberts, bardic name Ieuan Gwyllt (1822–1877), Welsh musician and Calvinistic Methodist minister

== Others ==
- John Roberts (poet) (1712–1772), British politician and poet
- John Roberts (architect) (1712–1796), Irish architect
- John Roberts (urban planner) (1929–1992), British transportation planner
- John Maddox Roberts (1947–2024), American author
- John Roberts (writer) (born 1947), English journalist and author
- John Roberts, British film director of War of the Buttons
- John D. Roberts (1918–2016), chemist
- John Martyn Roberts (1806–1878), British inventor
- John Bingham Roberts (1852–1924), American doctor giving his name to Roberts syndrome
- John Roberts (engineer) (fl. 1969–2006), British structural engineer
- John Roberts, co-founder of Edapt and Oak National Academy

== See also ==
- Jack Roberts (disambiguation)
- Jon Roberts (1948–2011), drug trafficker
- Jon H. Roberts, American historian
- Jonathan Roberts (disambiguation)
- John Robarts (disambiguation)
