= George Roberts (1769–1853) =

Welsh settler and minister

- Born: 11 February 1769; Bronyllan, Mochdre, Montgomeryshire, Wales
- Died: November 1853 (aged 84); Ebensburg, Pennsylvania, U.S.
- Occupations: Settler and minister

George Roberts (11 February 1769 – November 1853) was a Welsh settler and independent minister in the United States.

== Biography ==
Roberts was the son of Evan and Mary Roberts of Bronyllan, Mochdre, Montgomeryshire, where he was born on 11 February 1769. He was one of twelve children. His sister Mary was mother of William Williams (1801–1876) and the Rev. Richard Williams (1802–1842) of Liverpool. George's older brother, John Roberts, was a divine. Until he was 17, George worked at the loom with his father. He then worked on farms at Carno and Llanbrynmair. He married Jane Edwards in May 1795.

In July 1795, Roberts immigrated to the United States with Ezekiel Hughes and others. On the way to America, they ran into problems with press gangs and storms. They made landfall at Philadelphia on 26 October 1795. Hughes' group left for Ohio in spring 1796 while Roberts' group stayed in Philadelphia until September 1796. Roberts' group then travelled on foot until 19 November, when they settled at the Welsh-American colony of Cambria, Pennsylvania, that had been founded by Morgan John Rhys. Roberts became co-pastor of a congregation at nearby Ebensburg, Pennsylvania, in 1806. He had been in debt for many years until becoming a county justice in 1807 and coming into some land in 1808.

In 1834, Roberts published A View of the Primitive Ages, an English version of the Welsh classic Drych y Prif Oesoedd by Theophilus Evans. This was reprinted at Llanidloes, North Wales, about 1864 (Williams, Montgomeryshire Worthies, pp. 124–6, 281–3, 313, 319). Roberts died in November 1853 at Ebensburg.
