= Jack Roberts =

Jack or Jackie Roberts may refer to:

- Jack Roberts (actor) (born 1979), American actor
- Jack Roberts (screenwriter) (1912–1980) American screenwriter
- Jack Roberts (American football) (1910–1981), American football player
- Jack Roberts (Canadian football) (c. 1930–2013), Canadian football player
- Jack Roberts (climber) (1954–2012), American rock and ice climber
- Jack Roberts (footballer, born 1867) (1867–1921), Australian rules footballer
- Jack Roberts (footballer, born 1873), (1873–19??) English footballer
- Jack Roberts (footballer, born 1910) (1910–1985), English footballer
- Jack Roberts (footballer, born 1926) (1926–1965), Australian rules footballer
- Jack Roberts (footballer, born 1935), Australian rules footballer
- Jack Roberts (judge) (1910–1988), American judge of the United States District Court
- Jack Roberts (politician) (born 1952), American politician
- Jack Roberts (rugby union) (born 1991), Welsh rugby union player
- Jack Roberts (unionist) (1885–1962), New Zealand trade unionist and political activist
- Jackie Roberts (1918–2001), Welsh international footballer
- Jackie Roberts (umpire) (1912–1991), Barbadian cricket umpire

== See also ==
- John Roberts (disambiguation)
