= Cronicl y Cymdeithasau Crefyddol =

19th-century Welsh-language periodical

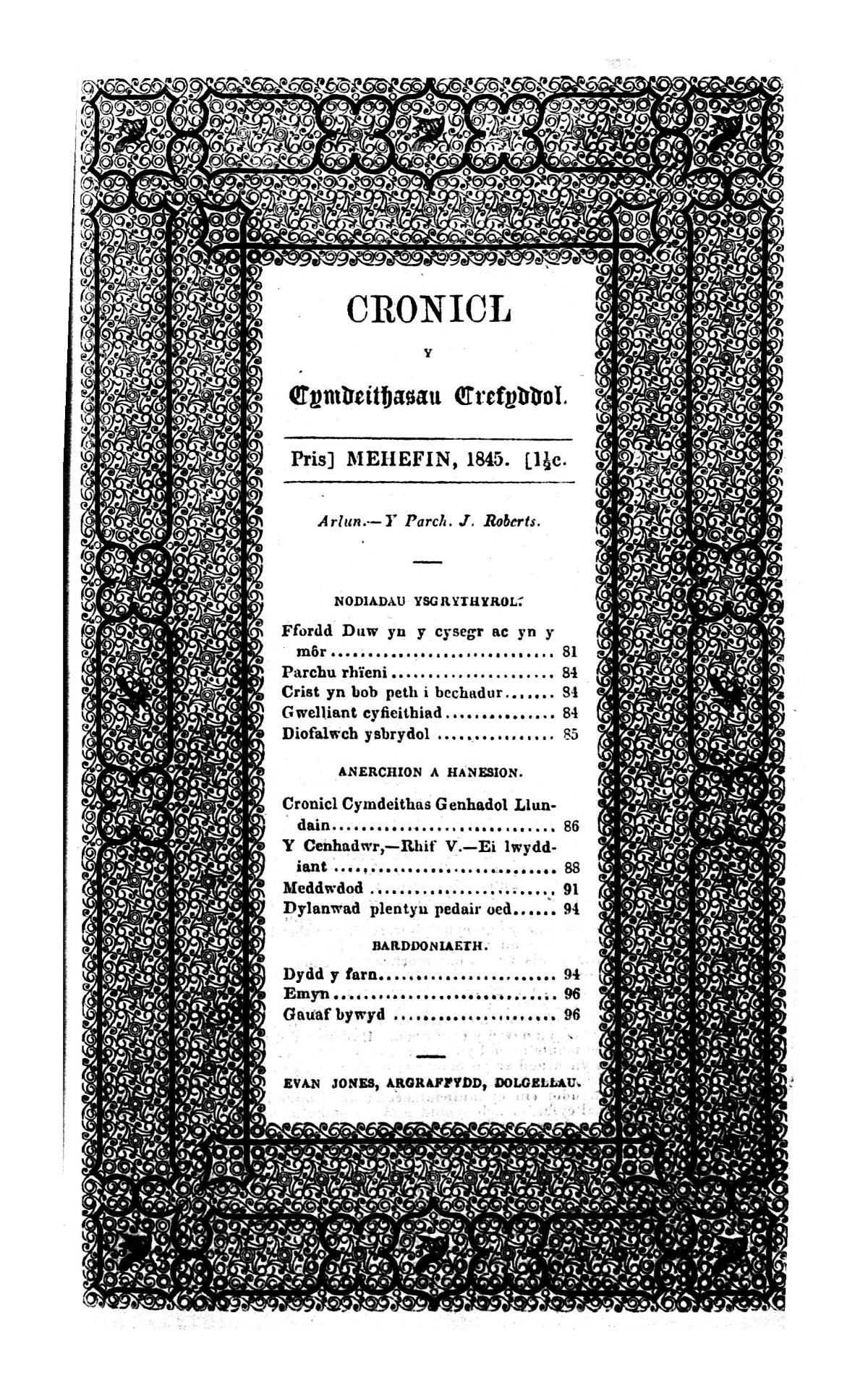
Cronicl y cymdeithasau crefyddol (Welsh Journal)

The Cronicl y Cymdeithasau Crefyddol was a 19th-century monthly Welsh language periodical first published in Llanbrynmair by its founder, Samuel Roberts, in 1843.

The periodical contained articles covering religious subjects, literature, and radicalism, mainly reflecting Samuel Roberts own views. The magazine's production was later taken over by Samuel's brother, John Roberts.
