= Allan Hunter (rugby union) =

NZ rugby union player

Allan Hunter MNZM

2nd Principal of Burnside High School
- In office 1969–1980
- Preceded by: Cliff Cross
- Succeeded by: John Godfrey

1st Principal of Upper Hutt College
- In office 1962–1969
- Succeeded by: Malcolm Ross

Personal details
- Born: Allan Douglas Hunter; 23 September 1922 Christchurch, New Zealand
- Died: 12 July 2017 (aged 94) Christchurch, New Zealand
- Spouse: Joan Esme Tyler (m. 1951; died 2002)
- Children: 3
- Education: Timaru Boys' High School; Canterbury University College
- Occupation: Schoolteacher

Rugby union career
- Position: First five-eighth
Provincial / State sides
Years	Team	Apps	(Points)
1949	Hawke's Bay		

Allan Douglas Hunter MNZM (23 September 1922 – 12 July 2017) was a New Zealand rugby union player and schoolteacher. He played provincial rugby for Hawke's Bay, and was principal of both Upper Hutt College and Burnside High School.

== Early life and family ==
Born in Christchurch on 23 September 1922, Hunter was educated at Timaru Boys' High School from 1936 to 1940. He then studied at Canterbury University College, graduating Master of Arts with third-class honours in 1948.

Hunter's university studies were interrupted by World War II. He was called up in July 1941, but he was allowed to defer army training until after examinations at the end of that year. He served with the First Battalion, Canterbury Regiment, which was tasked with defending the Canterbury coast against attack by the Japanese. He later travelled to Britain where he joined the Royal Navy and was commissioned as a sub-lieutenant, and served in HMS Rutherford from 1944 to 1945.

Hunter married Joan Esme Tyler in 1951, and the couple went on to have three children.

== Rugby union ==
While at Timaru Boys' High School, Hunter played for the school's 1st XV rugby team. He then played for the Canterbury University College club team alongside Bob Stuart, Larry Savage, and Jack Kelly. After moving to Napier in 1949, Hunter was selected for the Hawke's Bay provincial team, playing as a first five-eighth.

== Teaching career ==
Hunter taught at Napier Boys' High School from 1949, and Kuranui College, before being appointed the inaugural principal of Upper Hutt College in 1962. He remained in that position until 1969, when he moved to Burnside High School in Christchurch, serving as principal until his retirement in 1980.

== Later life and death ==
In retirement, Hunter was active in community organisations, and was the inaugural president of the Burnside Men's Probus club. In 1995, he wrote a history of the Bishopdale–Burnside Rotary club, having been an inaugural member of the club in 1974 and its president from 1981 to 1982. He also wrote an account of the First Battalion Canterbury Regiment's coastal defence duties during World War II, published in 2000 and titled The Young Defenders. In the 2005 Queen's Birthday Honours, Hunter was appointed a Member of the New Zealand Order of Merit, for services to education and the community.

Hunter's wife, Joan, died in 2002. Hunter himself died in Christchurch on 12 July 2017.
