= Cronicl (Llanbrynmair) =

19th-century Welsh language periodical

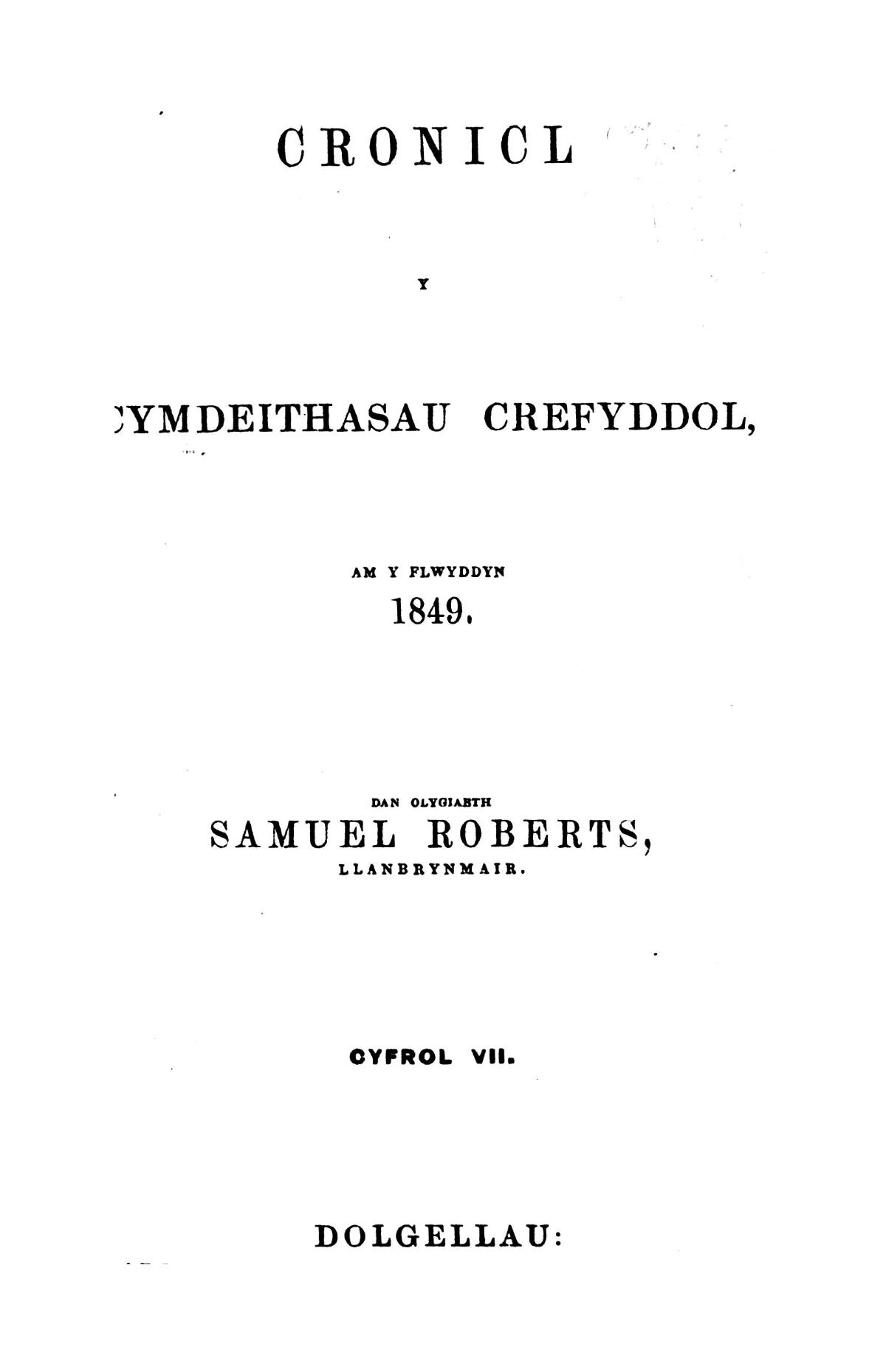
Cronicl (Llanbrynmair) (Welsh Journal)

The Cronicl (Llanbrynmair) was a 19th-century Welsh language monthly periodical. The magazine was founded in Llanbrynmair, by Samuel Roberts.

Containing articles on religious matters and literature, the magazine was mainly circulated amongst the local congregations. Roberts claimed to have sold over a million copies in ten years.

Samuel's brother John is believed to have later taken over as the magazine's editor.
