= Adauto =

Adauto is a given name. Notable people with the name include:

- Adauto Iglesias (1928–1991), Spanish football goalkeeper and manager
- Adauto Domingues (born 1961), Brazilian middle distance runner
- Adauto (footballer) (born 1980), Brazilian football striker
- Adauto Neto (born 1980), Brazilian football attacking midfielder
