= Jonathan Roberts =

Jonathan Roberts may refer to:

- Jonathan Roberts (politician) (1771–1854), American farmer, U.S. Senator from Pennsylvania
- Jonathan M. Roberts (1821–1888), writer
- Jonathan Roberts (writer) (born 1956), American author, screenwriter, and TV producer
- Jonathan Roberts (dancer) (born 1974), from the U.S. TV series Dancing with the Stars

== See also ==
- John Roberts (disambiguation)
