= Ezekiel Hughes =

Welsh settler (1766–1849)

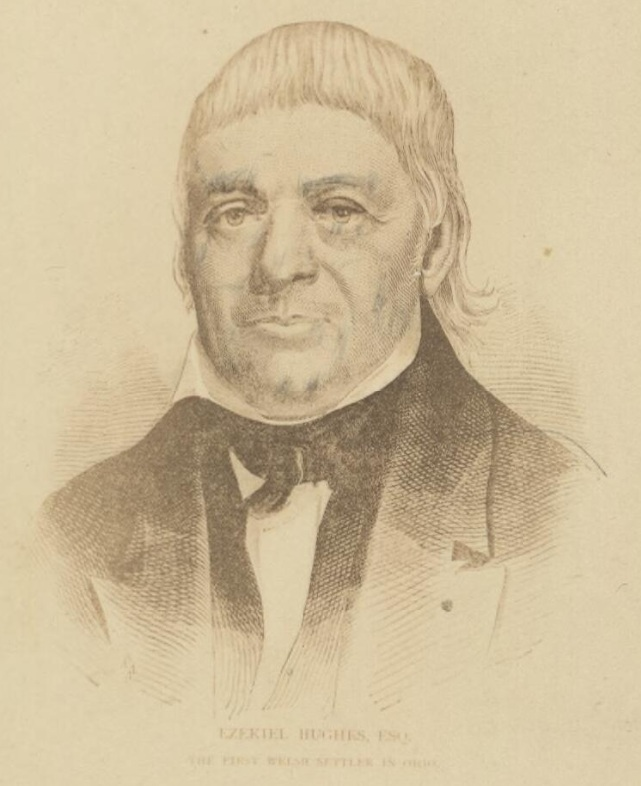
- Born: 22 August 1766; Llanbrynmair, Montgomeryshire, Wales
- Died: 2 September 1849 (aged 83); Ohio, U.S.
- Occupations: Farmer, justice of the peace, clockmaker

Ezekiel Hughes (22 August 1766 – 2 September 1849) was one of the earliest Welsh settlers in the Midwestern United States. Hughes, along with Edward Bebb, were the first Welsh settlers in Ohio. Historian Daniel Jenkins Williams said that Hughes and Bebb "were responsible for the first definite step westward on the part of Welsh emigrants."

== Biography ==
Hughes was born on 22 August 1766 in Llanbrynmair, Montgomeryshire, Wales, the son of Richard Hughes. Ezekiel had a small amount of education at Shrewsbury. When he was 20, he was apprenticed to the clockmaker John Tibbott of Newtown, Wales, of the noted Tibbott family. Hughes founded his own clockmaking shop in 1789 at Machynlleth, where he became an acquaintance of the Welsh radical William Jones.

In July 1795, Hughes, his cousin Edward Bebb, George Roberts, and others left Llanbrynmair and walked to Bristol. On 6 August, they set sail for Philadelphia. On the way to America, they ran into problems with press gangs and storms. They made landfall at Philadelphia on 25 October 1795 and stayed the winter. The next spring, Hughes visited Washington, D.C. In summer 1796, Hughes, Bebb, and William Gwilym set off for the Northwest Territory on foot. They spent a few weeks at Beula, Pennsylvania, a small town founded by Welshman Morgan John Rhys. They then travelled down the Ohio River in a flatboat before eventually making it to Cincinnati. They squatted on the east bank of the Miami River, a tributary of the Ohio, while they waited for the government to survey the west bank of the river. In 1801, the land on the west side was finally put up for sale. Hughes bought sections 15 and 16 in present-day Whitewater Township, Hamilton County, Ohio, while Bebb bought a half section in present-day Morgan Township, Butler County, Ohio. They were the first Welsh settlers in Ohio. Historian Daniel Jenkins Williams said that Hughes and Bebb "were responsible for the first definite step westward on the part of Welsh emigrants." Hughes built a cabin and started farming with Bebb. Bebb's son, William Bebb, later became the governor of Ohio.

In September 1802, Hughes returned to Wales and married Margaret Bebb in May 1803. He then returned to Ohio but Margaret died within a year. She was buried in the first grave at Berea, Ohio. In 1805, Hughes was put in charge of planning a road from Miami River to Hamilton, Ohio. In 1808, he married Mary Ewing, a native of Pennsylvania, and had nine children. Hughes was the first justice of the peace in his district as well. He acquired a large amount of land, which he rented out. He built a chapel in 1822.

Hughes died on 2 September 1849. According to the Dictionary of Welsh Biography, he was a "great personal friend" of William Henry Harrison. They went to the same church.
