= Burnside Park =

Burnside Park could refer to:

- Burnside, Nova Scotia, a business park and neighbourhood located in the Dartmouth area of Halifax Regional Municipality
- Burnside Park, Providence, Rhode Island, a small park
- Burnside Park, Christchurch, a large park and playing field in Christchurch, New Zealand.
