= Burnside High School =

- Te Kura o Waimairi-iri
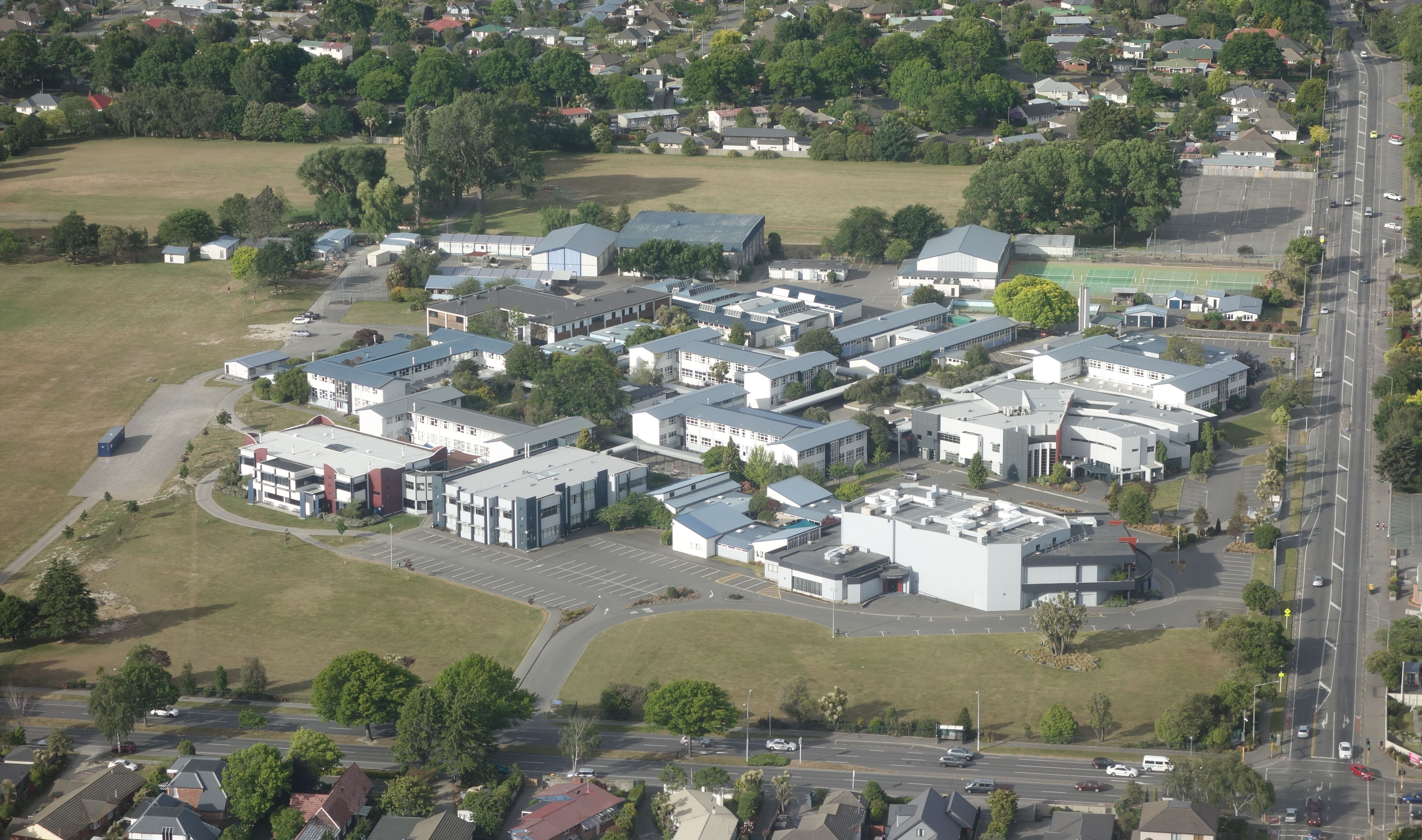
- Aerial view of Burnside High School in 2015

Location
- Greers Road, Burnside; Christchurch, 8053; New Zealand; 43°30′27″S 172°34′34″E

Information
- Type: State secondary
- Motto: Latin: Recte Sic Dirige Cursum (Along this path direct your journey correctly)
- Established: 2 February 1960; 66 years ago
- Ministry of Education Institution no.: 319
- Principal: Scott Haines
- Years: 9–13
- Gender: Co-educational
- Enrolment: 2,724 (July 2026)
- Socio-economic decile: 8P
- Website: burnside.school.nz

Burnside High School (Māori: Te Kura o Waimairi-iri) is a state co-educational secondary school located in the suburb of Burnside in Christchurch, New Zealand. With a roll of 2,724 students, it is the largest school in New Zealand outside Auckland, and is among the country's four largest schools.

== History ==
The Burnside property, an area of 59 hectares (150 acres), belonged to Canterbury University College (later the University of Canterbury) as an endowment. When the college considered moving away from its central city site, the Burnside property was considered, but the college purchased what is now known as the Ilam campus in the late 1940s instead. A reduced land area was used by the Ministry of Education for Burnside High School.

In April 1958, the Christchurch Post-primary Schools’ Council unanimously recommended Burnside High School be constructed and by a 7–2 margin recommended it as a single-sex girls' school. The lack of consultation, opposition from the community, and incorrect interpretation about demand for girls' secondary school places saw the council rescind its decision to make Burnside a single-sex girls' school. On 24 June 1958, the council voted by a 6–4 margin to recommend Burnside be a coeducational school. Cabinet approved construction of the school in August 1958. Tenders for the first stage of construction were called, closing on 30 January 1959. Approval of a construction tender was delayed until late March 1959, losing three months of dry weather for construction and risking the completion in time for the 1960 school year. The tender for the first stage was let to John Calder Limited for £160,000, and construction began in mid-April 1959.

Cabinet approved construction of the school in August 1958. Tenders for the first stage of construction were called, closing on 30 January 1959. Approval of a construction tender was delayed until late March 1959, losing three months of dry weather for construction and risking the completion in time for the 1960 school year. The tender for the first stage was let to John Calder Limited for £160,000, and construction began in mid-April 1959.

Burnside High School officially opened to students on 2 February 1960, with an initial intake of 230 third-form (now Year 9) students.

A swimming pool was added in 1961, which became fully functional in 1964 after the addition of filtration equipment. The gymnasium was soon constructed afterwards. In 2004 and 2005 construction of two new blocks, a library and an administration area began. These were opened in 2006 by Helen Clark, then Prime Minister of New Zealand. The school's fiftieth jubilee was held in 2010, attended by John Key, an ex-pupil and Prime Minister of New Zealand. Following damage caused by the February 2011 Christchurch earthquake, Avonside Girls' High School shared the facilities of Burnside High School. Avonside Girls' High School relocated back to their home site in 2012. Burnside High School, due to being relatively undamaged and with power and water restored shortly after the quake, was used as a welfare centre by Civil Defence.

On 28 March 2012 the school was put into lockdown after students reported seeing a man walking the grounds carrying a silver pistol, which was later found by police to be plastic.

== Enrolment ==
Burnside, like many secondary schools in Christchurch, operates an enrolment scheme to help curb roll numbers and prevent overcrowding. The school's zone includes the suburbs of Burnside and Bryndwr, and parts of Bishopdale, Fendalton, Ilam and Avonhead.

At the August 2013 Education Review Office (ERO) review of the school, the school had 2416 students enrolled, including 135 international students. Forty-seven percent of students were male and 53 percent were female. Sixty-three percent of students identified as European (including 56 percent as New Zealand European or Pākehā), 22 percent as Asian, eight percent as Māori, two percent as Pasifika, and five percent as another ethnicity.

As of July 2026, Burnside High School has roll of 2,724 students, of which 199 (7.3%) identify as Māori.

As of 2026, the school has an Equity Index of 416, placing it amongst schools whose students have few socioeconomic barriers to achievement (roughly equivalent to deciles 8 and 9 under the former socio-economic decile system).

== Structure ==
The school is split into four divisions – North, South, West and Senior – the first three consisting of students from Years 9–12 and Senior division consisting of only Year 13 students.

Allan Hunter was principal from 1969 to 1980, when he retired. The current principal is Scott Haines, taking over from acting principal Andrea Magson in 2023.

== Grounds and facilities ==
Like most New Zealand state secondary schools built in the 1960s, the school is largely built to the Nelson Two-Storey plan. The Nelson Two-Storey is distinguished by its two-storey H-shaped classroom blocks, with stairwells at each end of the block and a large ground floor toilet and cloak area on one side. Burnside has four of these blocks: A, B, D, and E blocks (and the demolished F block). The school also has one 1970s standard S68 block, G block.

The earthquake-prone administration block was closed in late 2024 for strengthening work before reopening in 2025.

== Academics ==
As a state school, Burnside High School follows the New Zealand Curriculum (NZC). In Years 11 to 13, students complete the National Certificate of Educational Achievement (NCEA), the main secondary school qualification in New Zealand. Cambridge Mathematics (IGCSE, AS, and A Levels) has been offered for Year 11 to 13 students since 2011, and Cambridge Music has been offered for Year 11 to 13 students since 2022.

== Principals ==
Since its foundation in 1960, Burnside High School has had eight principals. The following is a complete list:

	Name	Term
1	Cliff Cross	1960–1969
2	Allan Hunter	1969–1980
3	John Godfrey	1981–1998
4	Graham Stoop	1999–2004
5	Ron Noordijk	2004–2009
6	Warwick Maguire	2009–2014
7	Phil Holstein	2014–2023
8	Scott Haines	2023–present

== Notable alumni ==
- Jack Ansett – stand-up comedian and television writer
- Murray Davie – All Black and Canterbury rugby player
- Samantha Donnelly – New Zealand track cyclist
- Andrew Ellis – All Black, Canterbury and Crusaders rugby player; member of New Zealand’s 2011 Rugby World Cup-winning squad
- Matt Gibb – television and radio presenter
- Tearepa Kahi – film director and screenwriter
- John Key – Prime Minister of New Zealand from 2008 to 2016
- Peter Lineham – historian, author and academic specialising in religion in New Zealand
- Kathryn McGrath – physical chemist and university research leader
- Amanaki Nicole – New Zealand rugby sevens representative and Olympic squad member
- Shayne Philpott – All Black and Canterbury rugby player
- Mikaele Ravalawa – Fiji international rugby league player and NRL player
- Sara Templeton – Christchurch City Councillor and community advocate
- Helen Townsend – Olympic softball player from Christchurch
- Hayley Westenra – classical-crossover singer

== Sources ==
- Gardner, W. J.; Beardsley, E. T.; Carter, T. E. (1973). Phillips, Neville Crompton (ed.). A History of the University of Canterbury, 1873–1973. Christchurch: University of Canterbury.
- O'Connor, Paul (2009). Choosing the Right Path: Burnside High School 1960–2010. Christchurch: Silver Fox Publishing. ISBN 978-0-473-15685-5.
- Jubilee Committee (1985). Burnside High School: the first 25 years, 1960–1985. Christchurch: Jubilee Committee.
