= Fendalton =

Suburb of Christchurch, New Zealand

- Suburb
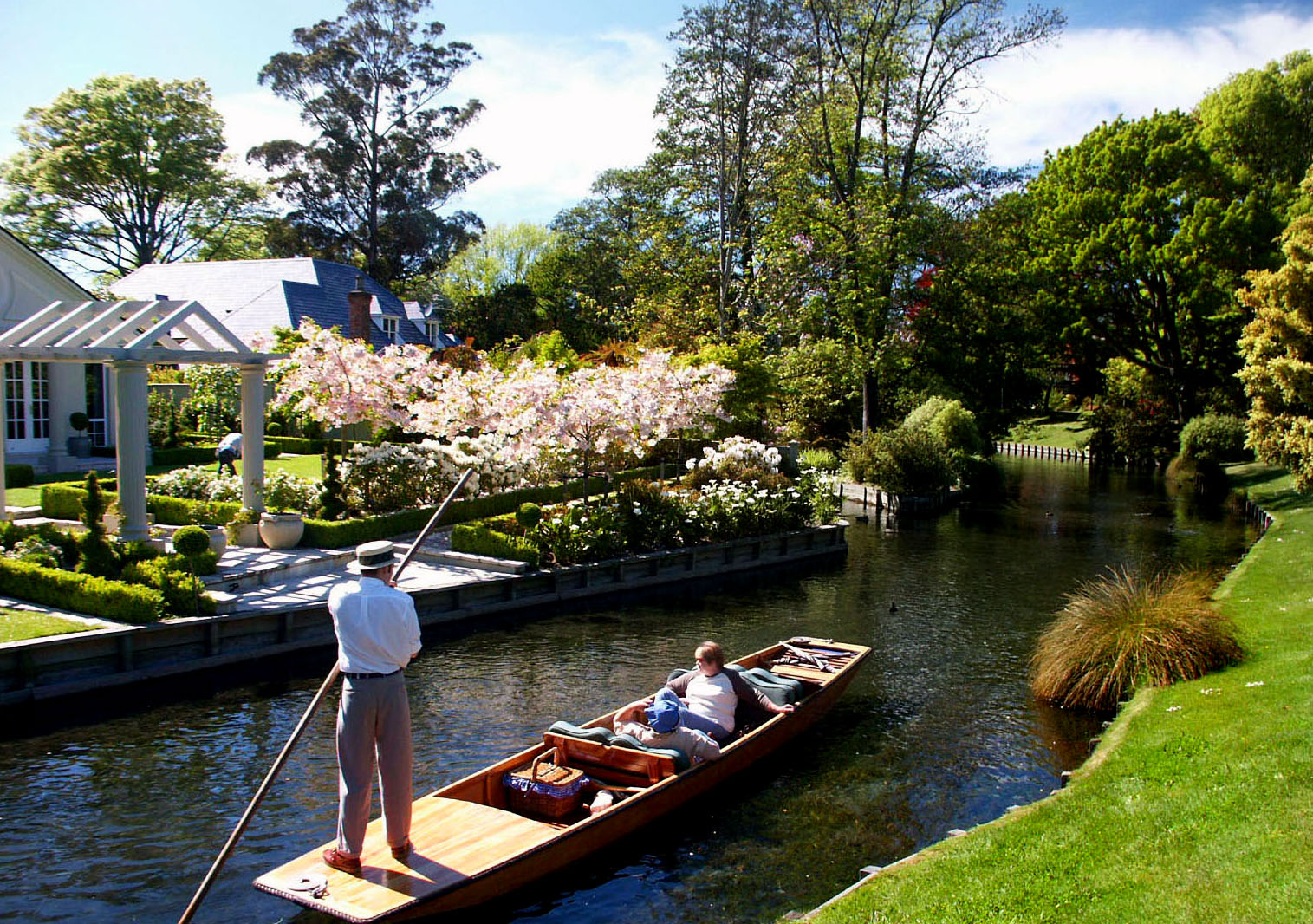
- Punting at Mona Vale, a prominent park and former homestead in Fendalton.
- Interactive map of Fendalton
- Coordinates: 43°31′S 172°36′E
- Country: New Zealand
- City: Christchurch
- Local authority: Christchurch City Council
- Electoral ward: Fendalton
- Community board: Waimāero Fendalton-Waimairi-Harewood; Waipuna Halswell-Hornby-Riccarton
- Established: 1850

Area
  - Land: 217 ha (540 acres)

Population (June 2025)
  - Total: 4,870
  - Density: 2,240/km^{2} (5,810/sq mi)
- Postcode: 8052

Bryndwr	Strowan
Ilam	Fendalton	Merivale
Upper Riccarton	Riccarton	(Hagley Park)

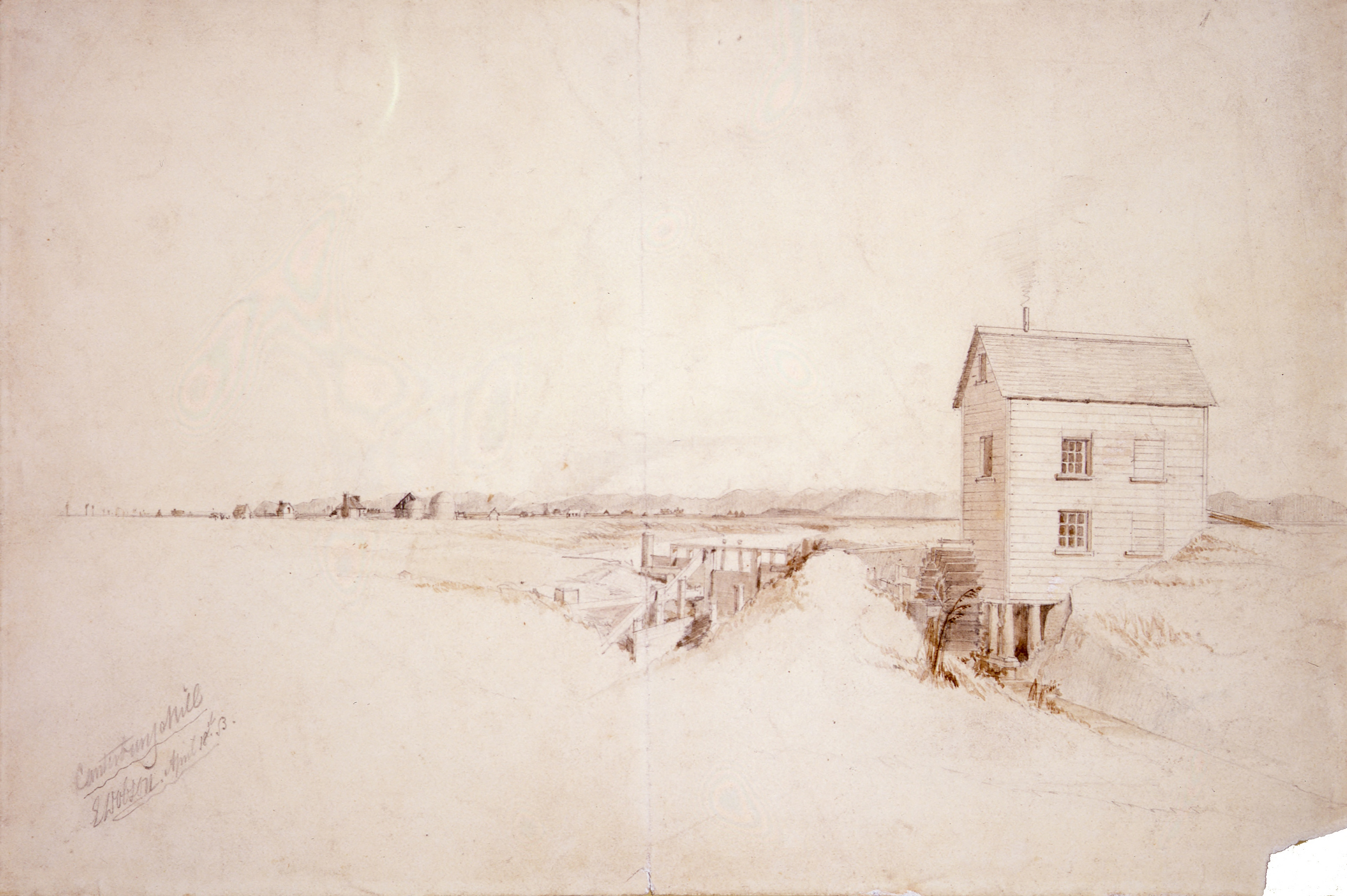
Daniel Inwood's flour mill in Fendalton, 1853

Fendalton is a suburb of Christchurch, in the South Island of New Zealand.

== History ==
Fendalton was originally known as Fendall Town, named after the original settler of the land, Walpole Chesshyre Fendall (1830–1913). Fendall emigrated from Yorkshire in 1850 and took up land north of the Waimairi Stream. The name Fendall Town was soon applied to the area northwest of Hagley Park, extending as far as the modern location of Christchurch International Airport and including portions of Burnside, Bryndwr, and Harewood, among others. Early spelling also included Fendall's Town and Fendaltown, but by the 1880s Fendalton had become the most common form. Fendalton was the site for many early buildings in the settlement of Christchurch, including an early flour mill along what is now Fendalton Road. This flour mill was constructed by Daniel Inwood, who came to New Zealand aboard the Sir George Seymour in 1850, and used machinery which Inwood brought with him from England.

The suburb is also home to multiple significant historical buildings, especially as examples of various styles of homestead. These include St Barnabas Church, Daresbury, and Los Angeles, one of the first examples of a California bungalow to be built in New Zealand.

A history of the suburb can be found in "Fendall's Legacy: A history of Fendalton and north-west Christchurch" by Frieda Looser.

== Demographics ==
Fendalton, comprising the statistical areas of Fendalton and Deans Bush, covers 2.17 km^{2} (0.84 sq mi). It had an estimated population of 4,870 as of June 2025, with a population density of 2,244 people per km^{2}.

Historical population
Year	Pop.	±% p.a.
2006	4,737	—
2013	4,578	−0.49%
2018	4,515	−0.28%
2023	4,665	+0.66%

Fendalton had a population of 4,665 in the 2023 New Zealand census, an increase of 150 people (3.3%) since the 2018 census, and an increase of 87 people (1.9%) since the 2013 census. There were 2,229 males, 2,421 females, and 15 people of other genders in 1,761 dwellings. 3.3% of people identified as LGBTIQ+. The median age was 45.2 years (compared with 38.1 years nationally). There were 714 people (15.3%) aged under 15 years, 966 (20.7%) aged 15 to 29, 1,851 (39.7%) aged 30 to 64, and 1,131 (24.2%) aged 65 or older.

People could identify as more than one ethnicity. The results were 79.1% European (Pākehā); 5.4% Māori; 1.7% Pasifika; 17.8% Asian; 2.1% Middle Eastern, Latin American and African New Zealanders (MELAA); and 2.1% other, which includes people giving their ethnicity as "New Zealander". English was spoken by 96.4%, Māori by 0.9%, Samoan by 0.4%, and other languages by 18.5%. No language could be spoken by 1.2% (e.g. too young to talk). New Zealand Sign Language was known by 0.5%. The percentage of people born overseas was 28.2, compared with 28.8% nationally.

Religious affiliations were 36.8% Christian, 1.4% Hindu, 1.6% Islam, 0.1% Māori religious beliefs, 1.1% Buddhist, 0.3% New Age, 0.1% Jewish, and 1.0% other religions. People who answered that they had no religion were 52.6%, and 5.2% of people did not answer the census question.

Of those at least 15 years old, 1,695 (42.9%) people had a bachelor's or higher degree, 1,716 (43.4%) had a post-high school certificate or diploma, and 528 (13.4%) people exclusively held high school qualifications. The median income was $46,900, compared with $41,500 nationally. 948 people (24.0%) earned over $100,000 compared to 12.1% nationally. The employment status of those at least 15 was 1,656 (41.9%) full-time, 693 (17.5%) part-time, and 87 (2.2%) unemployed.

Individual statistical areas
Name	Area (km^{2})	Population	Density (per km^{2})	Dwellings	Median age	Median income
Fendalton	0.92	2,073	2,253	795	46.2 years	$51,800
Deans Bush	1.25	2,586	2,069	963	44.5 years	$42,900
New Zealand					38.1 years	$41,500

== Location and services ==
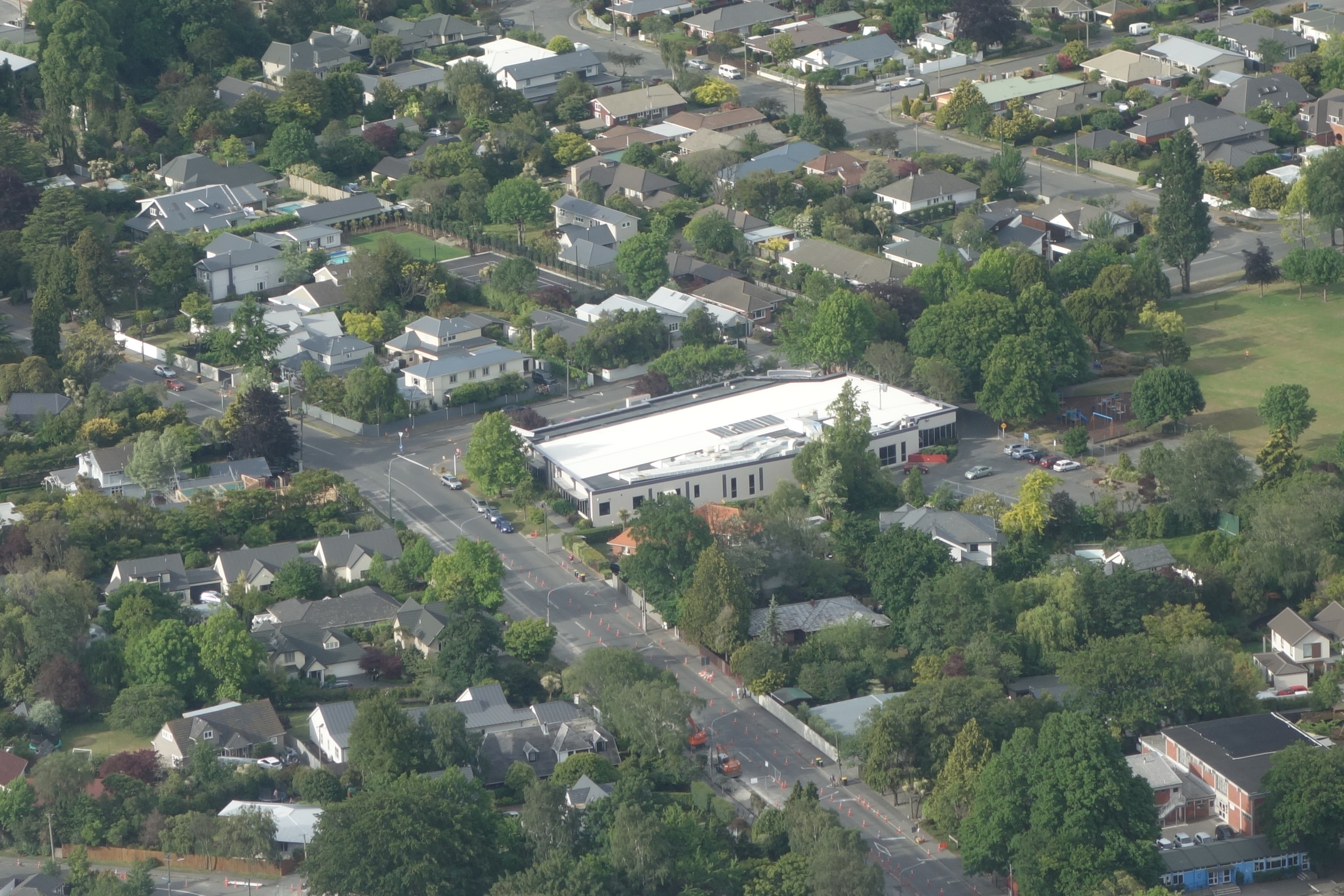
Fendalton Library

Fendalton is situated to the west of the city centre, close to the University of Canterbury at Ilam and the major retail area of Riccarton. It is also close to the main route from the central city to the Christchurch International Airport to the northwest.

Fendalton has a reputation as one of the country's more well-to-do and refined suburbs, and is one of the older residential areas of the city.

== Education ==
One high school lies directly within the suburb - Christchurch Boys' High School. The school includes boarding facilities, and has a roll of 1,426. The school opened in 1881, and moved to its present site in 1926.

While Christchurch Girls' High School catchment zone encompasses much of Fendalton, the school itself lies within the suburb of Riccarton.

The local state intermediate school is Cobham Intermediate School.

The main primary school in Fendalton is Fendalton Open Air School, originally called Clyde Road Primary School. It has a roll of 419. It opened in 1875.
