= Burnside, Christchurch =

Suburb of Christchurch, New Zealand

Burnside
- Suburb
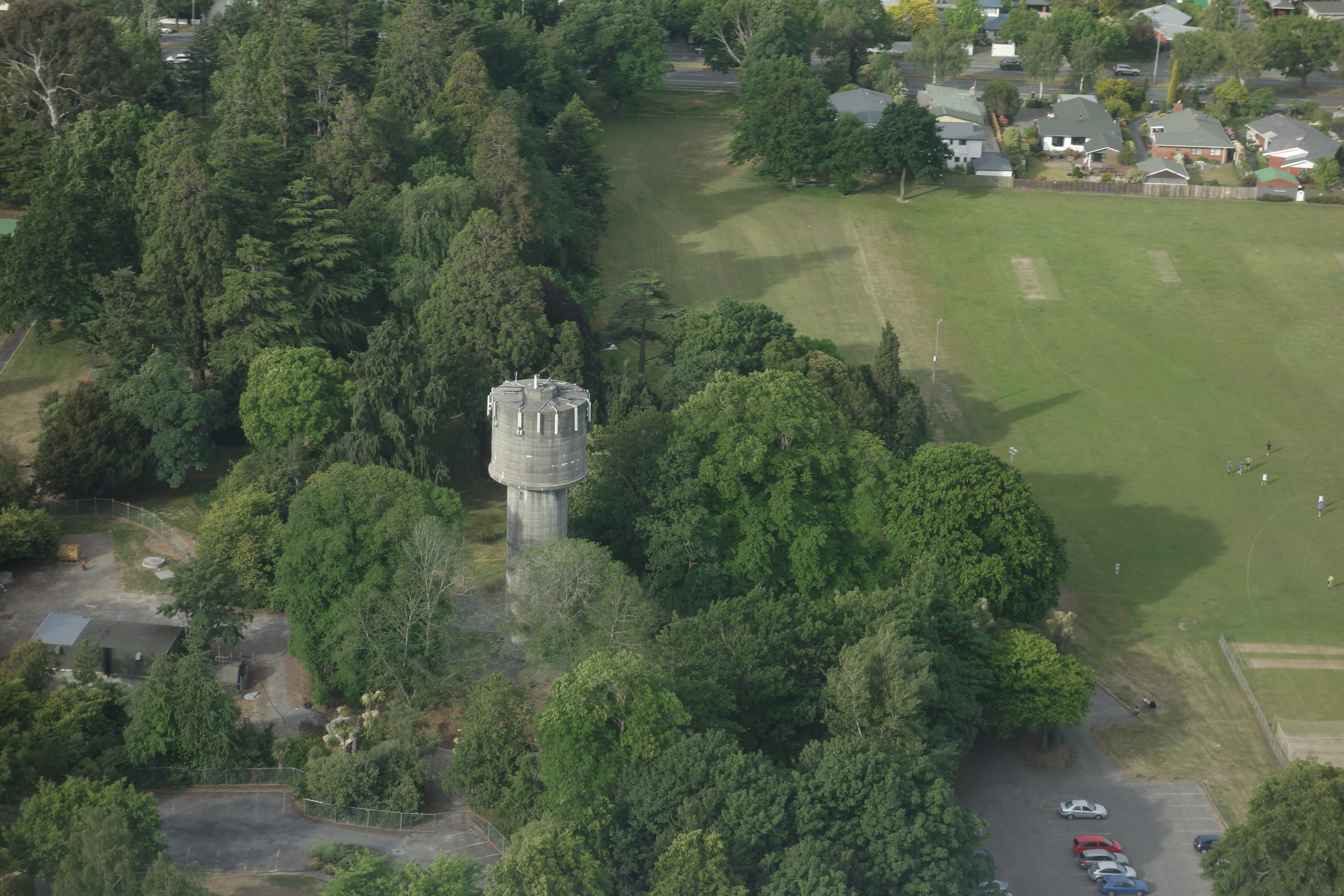
- Burnside Park
- Interactive map of Burnside
- Coordinates: 43.499857°S 172.568658°E
- Country: New Zealand
- City: Christchurch
- Local authority: Christchurch City Council
- Electoral ward: Waimairi; Fendalton
- Community board: Waimāero Fendalton-Waimairi-Harewood

Area
  - Land: 457 ha (1,130 acres)

Population (June 2025)
  - Total: 8,370
  - Density: 1,830/km^{2} (4,740/sq mi)

Harewood	Bishopdale
	Burnside	Bryndwr
Avonhead	Ilam	Fendalton

Burnside is a suburb of Christchurch, New Zealand, located southeast of Christchurch International Airport. As with most suburbs in Christchurch, it has no defined boundaries and is a general area.

== History ==
Burnside was originally part of a farm, approximately 1,700 acres (6.9 km^{2}) in size, owned by the early settler William Boag (1828–1904), who arrived in 1851 from Perthshire. It was named for the small creeks that formed the headwaters of the Waimairi Stream. The name Burnside was made official by the Waimairi County Council in 1959, although Burnside Road had been renamed Memorial Avenue in 1950.

For the first hundred years of European settlement, the area in and around Burnside was farmland, with sheep, cattle and orchards occupying the land.

== Demographics ==
Burnside, comprising the statistical areas of Burnside, Burnside Park and Burnside West (called Russley until 2023), covers 4.57 km^{2} (1.76 sq mi). It had an estimated population of 9,690 as of June 2025, with a population density of 1,832 people per km^{2}.

Historical population
Year	Pop.	±% p.a.
2006	7,191	—
2013	7,338	+0.29%
2018	7,710	+0.99%
2023	7,875	+0.42%

Burnside had a population of 7,875 in the 2023 New Zealand census, an increase of 165 people (2.1%) since the 2018 census, and an increase of 537 people (7.3%) since the 2013 census. There were 3,840 males, 4,002 females, and 30 people of other genders in 2,763 dwellings. 3.6% of people identified as LGBTIQ+. The median age was 37.6 years (compared with 38.1 years nationally). There were 1,530 people (19.4%) aged under 15 years, 1,674 (21.3%) aged 15 to 29, 3,381 (42.9%) aged 30 to 64, and 1,287 (16.3%) aged 65 or older.

People could identify as more than one ethnicity. The results were 67.7% European (Pākehā); 8.7% Māori; 3.3% Pasifika; 27.4% Asian; 2.0% Middle Eastern, Latin American and African New Zealanders (MELAA); and 2.2% other, which includes people giving their ethnicity as "New Zealander". English was spoken by 94.0%, Māori by 1.6%, Samoan by 0.9%, and other languages by 25.2%. No language could be spoken by 2.0% (e.g. too young to talk). New Zealand Sign Language was known by 0.6%. The percentage of people born overseas was 34.1, compared with 28.8% nationally.

Religious affiliations were 33.8% Christian, 1.9% Hindu, 1.8% Islam, 0.1% Māori religious beliefs, 2.1% Buddhist, 0.4% New Age, 0.1% Jewish, and 1.9% other religions. People who answered that they had no religion were 51.8%, and 6.1% of people did not answer the census question.

Of those at least 15 years old, 2,070 (32.6%) people had a bachelor's or higher degree, 2,955 (46.6%) had a post-high school certificate or diploma, and 1,320 (20.8%) people exclusively held high school qualifications. The median income was $40,300, compared with $41,500 nationally. 753 people (11.9%) earned over $100,000 compared to 12.1% nationally. The employment status of those at least 15 was 3,057 (48.2%) full-time, 990 (15.6%) part-time, and 153 (2.4%) unemployed.

Individual statistical areas
Name	Area (km^{2})	Population	Density (per km^{2})	Dwellings	Median age	Median income
Burnside	1.36	3,603	2,649	1,218	35.8 years	$39,500
Burnside Park	1.34	3,198	2,387	1,104	36.8 years	$40,700
Burnside West	1.87	1,077	576	441	46.5 years	$42,600
New Zealand					38.1 years	$41,500

== Schools ==
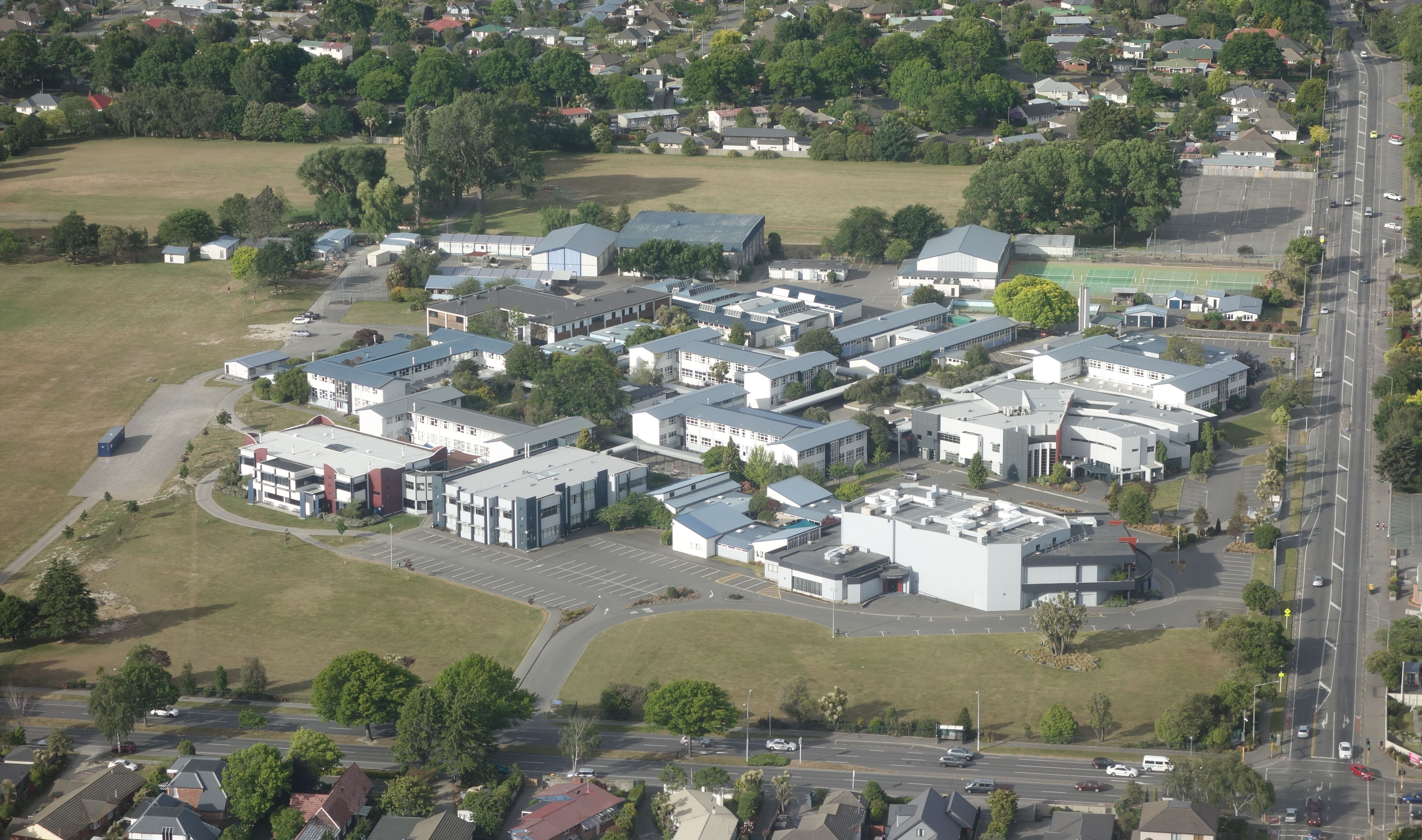
Burnside High School

Burnside High School is a secondary school catering for years 9 to 13. It has a roll of 2,725. The school opened in 1960.

Cobham Intermediate is an intermediate school catering for years 7 to 8. It has a roll of 670. The school, initially named Fendalton Intermediate, opened in 1963.

Burnside Primary School and Roydvale School are contributing primary schools catering for years 1 to 6. They have rolls of 301 and 275, respectively. Burnside School opened in 1956, and Roydvale in 1967. Kendal School, which opened in 1962, closed in 2014.

Christ the King School is a state-integrated Catholic primary school for years 1 to 8. It has a roll of 306.

All these schools are coeducational, and all except Christ the King are state schools. Rolls are as of March 2026.

== Suburb ==
Burnside contains a central park (Burnside Park), and its two central roads are Memorial Avenue and Greers Road. It contains a smaller park (Jellie Park) opposite Burnside High School on Greers Road.
