= John Cole Roberts =

Welsh geologist and lecturer (1935–2016)

John Cole Roberts (1935 – 30 September 2016) was a Welsh geologist.

His paper "Feather Fracture and the Mechanics of Rock Jointing" introduced the geological community to this newly identified and newly classified fracture patterning, along with its impact in terms of jointing structures. He announced it in the summer of 1961. It continues to be the definitive standard of feather fracture work.

== Early life ==
Roberts was born in 1935 in South Wales, and grew up in the valleys surrounding the iron and steel town of Dowlais. He would have left school and started work in his mid teens, like the majority of young people of the time, had it not been for a school master, Ron Gethin, who realised his aptitude for earth sciences.

The first boy to take geology to O-level and A-level in his district, Roberts studied at Swansea University (University of Wales), where he graduated and obtained his PhD in Geology, in 1961, for his thesis "Jointing and Minor Tectonics of the Neath Disturbance and Adjacent Areas". Roberts became an expert in the jointing and fracture science of the South Wales coalfields and in the geology of the areas around the Vale of Glamorgan and of the Gower Peninsula of Wales.

After receiving his doctorate, Roberts progressed into lecturing, initially at Aberystwyth University. There he met his future wife, Susan Davies (a mathematics undergraduate student). He later moved to Northern Ireland.

== Career ==
Roberts joined the staff at Magee College, Derry, (now part of the University of Ulster) in 1962. He was one of the first academics selected to staff the newly opened university (then called The New University, now Ulster University at Coleraine) when it opened in 1968.

Roberts remained at Ulster University until his retirement in 2001. He left as a Senior Lecturer in Environmental Science, and was its longest-serving staff member at the time of his retirement.

Dr Roberts' achievements focused on the geology of the Inishowen Peninsula in County Donegal, Northwest Ireland. An acknowledged world expert in the area's geology John continued his research and offered geological tours of the area for interested parties, up until the time of his death.

== Retirement ==
Roberts and his wife lived in Portstewart, on the Causeway Coast, for many years. He maintained close links with the university and served for many years as the President of the Senior Common Room (latterly 'in exile'). in retirement John volunteered as part of the local Causeway Hospital Radio team and was an active member of his local Probus club, as well as being a regular social member at Portstewart Golf Club.

== Death ==
John Roberts died on 30 September 2016, from pancreatic cancer. He is survived by his widow Susie, daughters Rebecca and Hannah and his grandchildren Reshon and Rhiannon Roberts, and Sheqeal Robert-Scott.
