= Edapt =

Legal organisation for support to school teachers and staff

- Industry: Education
- Founded: 1 November 2011; 15 years ago
- Founder: John Roberts
- Headquarters: Manchester, UK
- Area served: England and Wales
- Services: Edu-legal support for teachers and school staff
- Website: www.edapt.org.uk

Edapt is an organisation which provides school teachers and staff, in England and Wales, with advice and accompaniment in individual employment disputes and allegations.

It was founded as an apolitical alternative to the traditional teaching unions such as the NEU or NASUWT.

Its founder was John Roberts a former secondary-school teacher, and senior leader at Oak National Academy.

Edapt is based in Manchester, England, and operates across England and Wales.

== History ==
The Independent explains that Edapt was established "After a survey showed 44% of teacher trade union members were not interested in taking any form of industrial action."

It was reported in The Telegraph that "Edapt launched in 2012 as a membership organisations for teachers who pay a monthly subscription and can access up to £150,000 of legal costs".

The then Secretary of State of Education, Michael Gove, explained "John (the CEO) was unhappy with the way the unions were spending his money so has set up an organisation Edapt, to provide independent support for teaching professionals"

In February 2020, The Telegraph reported proposals set out by Edapt to Number 10 to amend the Employment Relations Act 1999. It explained "While all workers should have equal employment rights under the law, the existing legislation fails to give non-union members the right to be accompanied to formal meetings by 'reasonably qualified companions.'

In March 2021, a bill to allow teachers who are not members of trade unions to seek broader representation in legal hearings passed the first reading stage in the House of Commons. The Education Employment (Accompaniment to Hearings) Bill was introduced by the former headteacher and MP for Bassetlaw, Brendan Clarke-Smith. The bill did not reach its second hearing during the Parliamentary session under-which it was introduced.

In a response to a written parliamentary question raised by Steve Baker (politician) in April 2022, Edapt was cited in by the Minister of State (Education), Robin Walker stating that "the Secretary of State for Education, is supportive in principle of a change to the Employment Relations Act 1999 to give teachers who are not members of a trade union the right to be accompanied by a representative of another professional body, such as Edapt, to disciplinary and grievance meetings."
