= John Robarts (disambiguation) =

John Robarts (1917–1982) was a Canadian lawyer and statesman.

John Robartsor Robartes may also refer to:

- John Robarts (Baháʼí) (1901-1991), Canadian Bahá'í appointed a Hand of the Cause of God
- John Robarts (VC) (1818-1888), English recipient of the Victoria Cross
- John Robartes, 1st Earl of Radnor (1606–1685), English politician and soldier during the English Civil War English and English Restoration
- John Robartes, 4th Earl of Radnor (1686–1757)

== See also ==
- John Roberts (disambiguation)
