= John Roberts (1767–1834) =

Welsh divine

- Born: 25 February 1767; Bronyllan, Mochdre, Montgomeryshire, Wales
- Died: 21 July 1834 (aged 67)
- Occupation: Divine

John Roberts (25 February 1767 – 21 July 1834) was a Welsh divine.

== Biography ==
Roberts was the son of Evan and Mary Roberts of Bronyllan, Mochdre, Montgomeryshire, where he was born on 25 February 1767. He was one of twelve children. His sister Mary was mother of William Williams (1801–1876) and the Rev. Richard Williams (1802–1842) of Liverpool. John's younger brother, George Roberts (1769–1853), emigrated to America.

John's parents removed in his youth to Llanbrynmair, and joined the old-established independent church there. Roberts commenced to preach in January 1790. In March following he entered the Oswestry academy, then under Dr. Edward Williams (1750–1813); he was ordained on 25 August 1796 as co-pastor of the Llanbrynmair church with the then aged Richard Tibbot, upon whose death, in March 1798, he became sole pastor. In addition to his pastoral work, Roberts kept a day-school at his chapel, and through his exertions six schoolhouses for occasional services and Sunday schools were built within a radius of five miles of Llanbrynmair. In 1806 he was induced to take a small farm belonging to Sir W. Williams-Wynn of Wynnstay, called Diosg, on the improvement of which he spent much money and energy, though only a tenant from year to year; but the harsh treatment subsequently dealt to him, and, after his death, to his widow and children, by raising the rent on his own improvements, under threat of a notice to quit, was made public by his son, Samuel Roberts (1800–1885), in "Diosg Farm: a Sketch of its History" (Newtown, 1854, 12mo), and has since been frequently quoted as a typical example of the confiscation of tenants' improvements by Welsh landlords (see Henry Richard, Letters and Essays on Wales, 1884, pp. 107–9; Minutes of Evidence before Welsh Land Commission, 1893–6, Qu. 74898 et seq.). He died on 21 July 1834, and was buried in the burial-ground of the parish church.

On 17 January 1797 Roberts married Mary Brees of Coed Perfydau, Llanbrynmair, who died on 9 March 1848. By her he had three sons—Samuel (1800–1885) and John (1804–1884), who are separately noticed—and Richard, besides two daughters, one of whom, Maria, was the mother of John Griffith (1821–1877), a Welsh journalist, widely known as ‘Y Gohebydd.’

Roberts was noted for his suavity of temper and eminent piety. His theological views, which were moderately Calvinistic, he expounded in "Dybenion Marwolaeth Crist" ("The Ends of Christ's Death"), Carmarthen, 1814, 12mo. This evoked a tedious controversy, in which Roberts was bitterly assailed by Arminians on the one hand and by ultra-Calvinists on the other. Thomas Jones (1756–1820) of the latter school replied to Roberts, and this drew from him in 1820 "Galwad Ddifrifol ar Ymofynwyr am y Gwirionedd," Dolgelly, 12mo (‘A Serious Call to Inquirers for the Truth’), which was endorsed by leading independent ministers (Rees, Protestant Nonconformity in Wales, pp. 431–3). A second edition of Jones's work and of Roberts's reply was issued in one volume in 1885 (Bala, 8vo).

In addition to the above, and contributions to magazines, including the "Evangelical Magazine," of which he was a trustee, Roberts's chief works were:

- "Anerchiad Caredigol at bawb sydd yn dymuno gwybod y gwirionedd," 1806.
- "Galwad Garedigol ar yr Arminiaid" (Dolgelly, 1807), of which an English version was also issued under the title "A Friendly Address to the Arminians," &c. (1809), followed by "A Second Address to the Arminians," which was a rejoinder to a reply by a T. Brocas of Shrewsbury ("Universal Goodness," &c., 1808, 12mo) to the first address.
- "Cyfarwyddiadau ac Anogaethau i Gredinwyr," &c. ("Directions and Counsels to Believers"), Bala, 1809, 12mo [this was reprinted in "Y Dysgedydd" for 1824].
- "Hanes Bywyd y Parch. Lewis Rees" (a biography of Lewis Rees, 1710–1800), Carmarthen, 1814, 12mo.
- "Y Wenynen" (a collection of short anecdotes), 1816.
