= Tūora Fendalton School =

Location
- 168 Clyde Road, Christchurch, New Zealand; 43.5164°S 172.5914°E

Information
- Type: State, Co-educational, Contributing
- Established: 1875
- Ministry of Education Institution no.: 3338
- Principal: Raewyn Saunders
- Enrolment: 419 (July 2026)
- Socio-economic decile: 10Z
- Website: fendalton.school.nz

Tūora Fendalton School (formerly Fendalton Open Air School) is a primary school in Christchurch, New Zealand, known for its open-air classrooms. Fendalton Primary School was established in 1875, continuing to provide education for primary school children in Fendalton for over 140 years. As of 2007, the school has 520 students, and the principal is Raewyn Saunders. In 2002 and 2003, it was runner up in the Goodman Fielder School of the Year Awards. In 2025 the school is celebrating its 150th Jubilee. The school has had a rebuild which included restoring the heritage classrooms named after Jane Deans and Ray Blank.

== History ==
The Fendalton School opened in 1875 at a time when half of the school-aged children in New Zealand were not attending school.

The school started open air classes in July 1924. It was based on pilot programmes in England where it was found that plenty of fresh air and open spaced classrooms allowed children to recover more quickly from disease. The school was closed during the Spanish flu epidemic of 1919, by the principal Ray Blank, Christchurch medical officer R B Phillips and Professor James Shelley, Education Professor of the Canterbury College. Blank and Phillips paid for half of the cost of building the new sun facing class rooms with long verandahs and large windows themselves. The previous rooms were so cold that one cup of hot cocoa was sold to the students at a cost of one penny a week.

The School was officially renamed as Fendalton Open Air School in 1963 (In the same year, the newly opened Cobham Intermediate School took over Years 7 and 8, and Fendalton Open Air School became a Year 1 to 6 school.). In 2024 the School adopted the name Tūora Fendalton School. The new name was gifted by Mana Whenua to reflect the schools history.

== Former students ==
Notable students who have attended Fendalton Open Air School include:

- Corey Anderson, New Zealand cricketer
- Sir Richard Hadlee, New Zealand cricketer, regarded as one of the greatest bowlers of all time and the first bowler to take 400 test match wickets
- Will Jordan, rugby union player
- Hayley Westenra, Classical vocalist
- Glenn Wilson, Psychologist
- Frank Worsley, Shackleton's captain on the ill-fated 1914–17 Imperial Trans-Antarctic Expedition
