= Helen Townsend =

New Zealand softball player and teacher

Helen Townsend (born 16 August 1969) is a New Zealand secondary school teacher and Olympic softball player from Christchurch.

Townsend was born in Christchurch and started playing softball at age 14. She represented New Zealand in softball in the New Zealand Under 19 team in her final year at Burnside High School, which she attended from 1983 to 1987. For ten years from 1990, she played in the Senior Women's team and represented New Zealand at the senior world championships in 1994 and 1998. The team missed qualifying for the 1996 Olympics, but made it to the 2000 Olympics in Sydney, where it came fifth. She played in Italy for a year and then in Canada for a year, and retired from playing softball after the 2000 Olympics.

Townsend graduated from the University of Otago with a Bachelor's in Physical Education and, after playing softball in Canada, was appointed a full-time physical education teacher at her old school, Burnside High. After the Olympics, she was a video analyst for the New Zealand men's national softball team. and while in that role, the men defended their world championship title. She remained a video analyst for the men's team until 2009, when she was inducted into the Softball New Zealand Hall of Fame, along with three others.
