= Adauto Iglesias =

Spanish footballer

Personal information
- Full name: Adauto Iglesias Fernández
- Date of birth: 28 October 1928
- Place of birth: Mieres, Spain
- Date of death: 12 September 1991 (aged 62)
- Place of death: Sydney, Australia
- Height: 1.78 m (5 ft 10 in)
- Position: Goalkeeper

Youth career
- 1942–1947: Unión de Mieres

Senior career*
Years	Team	Apps	(Gls)
1947–1948	Caudal Deportivo		
1948–1953	Real Madrid	9	
1950–1951	→ Plus Ultra (loan)	20	
1953–1957	Celta Vigo	68	
1957–1958	La Felguera	29	
1961–1965	APIA Leichhardt		

Managerial career
- 1967–1969: APIA Leichhardt
- * Club domestic league appearances and goals

Adauto Iglesias Fernández (born on 28 October 1928, died 12 September 1991) was a Spanish association football goalkeeper. He played in the main for Celta Vigo and Real Madrid. After emigrating to Australia he won NSW state league titles as player and coach with Sydney club APIA Leichhardt.

== Biography ==
Adauto Iglesias was born as the oldest of three brothers in the Asturian small town Mieres in northern Spain. His father was a factory worker, his mother run a butchers shop. He started playing football at the Colegio de los Hermanos de la Salle of his hometown. Initially he was centre forward. After one of his shots broke the glasses of a friar, he was stuck between the goalposts, and he stuck.

As a 13 year old he started on club level with Unión de Mieres. Five years later he became part of Caudal Deportivo, a local side which made it to the third division in 1946.

His talent was recognised, and a year later he was hired by Real Madrid, a respectable side which in the early 1930s had won a couple of national championships and had added since four wins in the national cup competition. However, he could not make the goalkeeping job his. In the first year he was reserve behind Bañón and in the second behind Alonso, thus he only made eight league matches in that period.

In 1950 he was passed on to Plus Ultra, the quasi reserve team of Real Madrid, which played in the second division. They used him in 20 league matches.

He returned for two more years to Real Madrid only finding use in one more Primera División match. In the season 1952–53 he had a new competitor for the number two spot, Cosme, who got to stand in eight times for Alonso, his only matches for the club in his three years there, while Adauto failed to get considered.

An official Real Madrid website praised Adauto for his positioning and general talent, but the presence of two great goalkeepers of the club's history, Bañón and Alonso, they say, prevented a more substantial career with the club. The site stated, that he was considered "one of the best keepers in the history of the club".

At the end of the season 1952–53 he was transferred to Celta de Vigo, where he played for the next 4 seasons. With Celta he was their regular keeper in his first season there. In the following three seasons he was only used in about half the matches of the club. Disciplinary issues are considered a cause of this.

He ended his career in Spain with the Asturian small town club CPS La Felguera playing there the 1957–58 season of the second division. Adauto played in 29 of the 34 league matches of the club. By the end of the season the club was last in the table, and thus ended the five most glorious years of the club - and Adauto ended his career as football player, at least this is what he thought then.

=== Retirement in Australia ===
In 1961 Iglesias emigrated to Australia and settled in Sydney. There he ended up joining the NSW state league club APIA Leichhardt, which won the state championships of 1964 and 1965; a national championship did not yet exist back then. He was in Apia's premiership-winning team in 1964. In that year he also got one match for the Australian national team, when they lost in Melbourne 1-5 to English club side Everton FC. After an injury he was replaced by John Roberts who impressed and got to keep the job. Roberts became the Australian national goalkeeper in 1965 and even had a career in England.

In early January 1967 he was appointed coach of APIA Leichhardt, replacing former Australian and APIA captain Joe Marston. The club finished that year first in the NSW State League, but like in 1966 lost the Grand Final to the runner-up, in this case with 5-2 to St. George Budapest. 1968 Apia only became third. 1969 did not start to well too and on 10 March he was replaced by the Austrian Walter Tamandl who led the team to second place and a win the Grand Final.

After his death on 12 September 1991 a requiem mass was held in St Fiacre's Church in Leichhardt. His remains were laid to rest in Botany Cemetery.
