= Richard Williams (1835–1906) =

Welsh antiquarian and solicitor

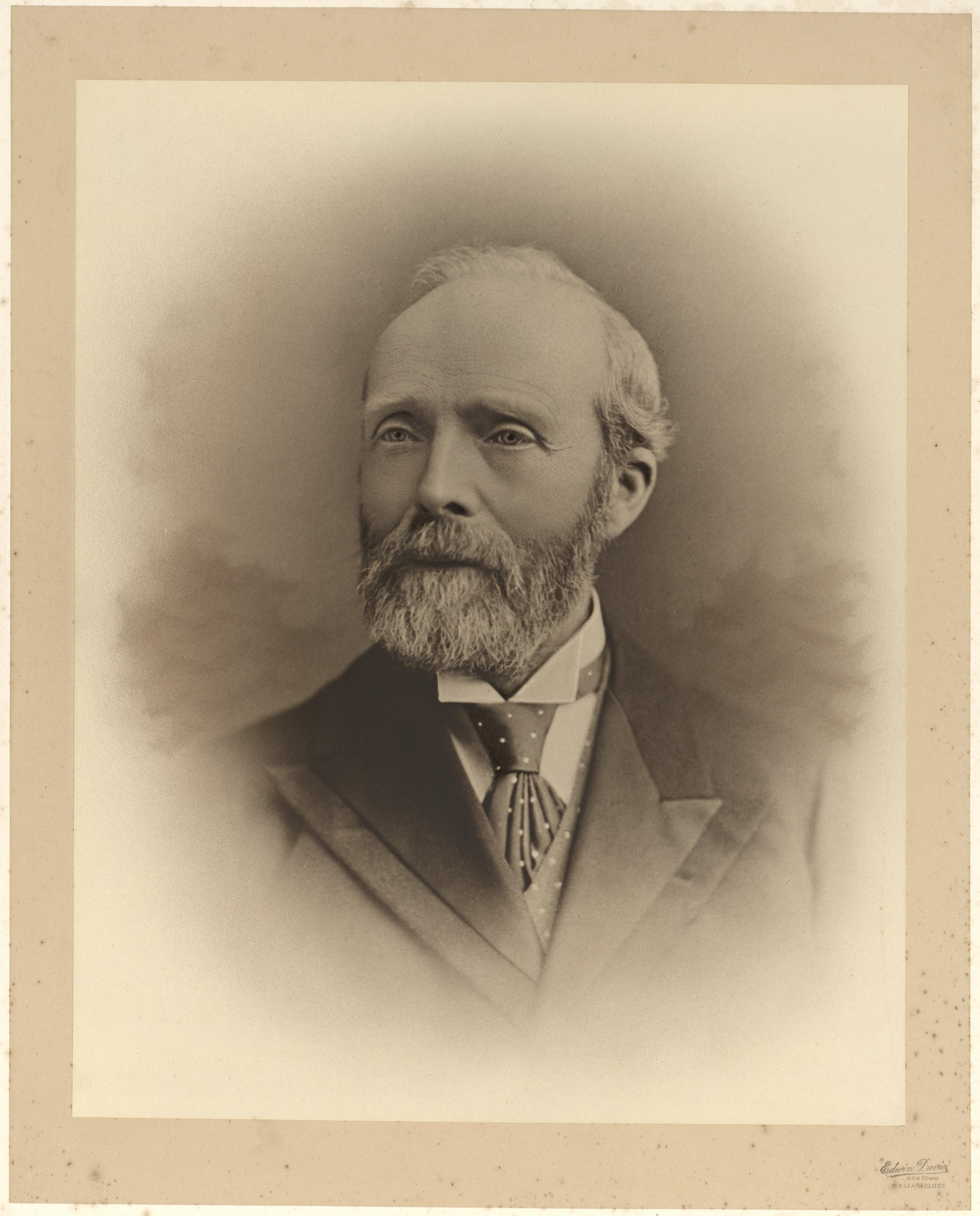
- Williams c. 1905
- Born: 1835; Llanbrynmair, Montgomeryshire, Wales
- Died: 15 June 1906 (aged 70–71); Newtown, Montgomeryshire, Wales
- Occupations: Antiquarian and solicitor

Richard Williams (1835 – 15 June 1906) was a Welsh antiquarian and solicitor.

== Biography ==
Williams was born in 1835 at Bont Dolgadfan, Llanbrynmair, Montgomeryshire. He was the son of William Williams. Richard went to schools in Llanbrynmair and Newtown, and later at Bala Calvinistic Methodist College.

Williams worked in several law offices beginning in 1851 and became a solicitor in 1866. He moved to Newtown in 1869, and spent the remainder of his life there. He was an agent for Stuart Rendel, the first Liberal Member of Parliament for Montgomeryshire. Williams also became coroner and superintendent registrar in 1889. He retired in 1901 due to poor health.

Williams published Montgomeryshire Worthies, a series of biographies on notable people related to Montgomeryshire. He also published Caniadau Cyfeiliog, a collection of his father's works, and the History of the Parish of Llanbrynmair. He published various articles on the history of Wales as well. Williams edited Mabinogion and Philip Yorke's Royal Tribes of Wales. Williams also translated Francis Bacon's first book, Essays, into Welsh.

Williams was a founder of the Powysland Club. He was an editor for the Montgomeryshire Collections, a member of the general committee for the Cambrian Archaeological Association, and a fellow of the Royal Historical Society. He was a contributor to Y Cymmrodor, Archaeologia Cambrensis, Y Traethodydd, and the Encyclopædia Britannica.

Williams died on 15 June 1906 in Newtown after a long illness. His extensive library was donated to the National Library of Wales as part of the library's founding in 1907.
