= John Keith Roberts =

Australian physicist

John Keith Roberts FRS
- 1943 portrait
- Born: 16 April 1897; Kew, Melbourne, Victoria, Australia
- Died: 26 April 1944 (aged 47); Marylebone, London, England
- Education: University of Melbourne; University of Cambridge
- Awards: Fellow of the Royal Society (1942)
- Scientific career
- Workplaces: National Physical Laboratory; Cavendish Laboratory; Anti-Submarine Experimental Establishment, Fairlie, Scotland
- Doctoral advisor: Ernest Rutherford

John Keith Roberts FRS (16 April 1897 – 26 April 1944) was an Australian physicist who was awarded an 1851 Exhibition Scholarship, and went to England, where he studied under Sir Ernest Rutherford at the University of Cambridge's Cavendish Laboratory. During the Second World War he was the chief scientist at the Royal Navy's Anti-Submarine Experimental Establishment in Fairlie, Scotland, where he oversaw the development of improved techniques for detecting submarines.

== Biography ==
John Keith Roberts was born in the Melbourne suburb of Kew on 16 April 1897, the eldest of the two children of Henry Charles Roberts, a stockbroker, and his wife Winifred Mary née French. He had a sister, Winifred. He was educated at Camberwell Grammar School, from which he graduated in 1913. Although he had passed the entrance examinations to university, he was, at age 16, too young to matriculate. He therefore spent a year with a firm in Melbourne, where he learned bookkeeping and business methods.

Roberts entered the University of Melbourne, where he enrolled in science. He initially intended to study chemistry, but became fascinated with physics. He received in BSc in 1918, and then his MSc in 1920. He was awarded the Dixson scholarship in natural philosophy, and a government research scholarship. He became a demonstrator in physics, and assisted Professor Thomas Laby in his work on the mechanical equivalent of heat. Roberts published two papers (one with Laby) on the subject in 1922.

Roberts was awarded an 1851 Exhibition Scholarship to study in England. On Laby's advice he studied under Sir Ernest Rutherford at the University of Cambridge's Cavendish Laboratory as a member of Trinity College, Cambridge. Roberts was briefly involved in the Rutherford's unsuccessful initial search for the neutron, but his main focus was on conservation of energy in hydrogen discharge. In 1922, Rutherford recommended Roberts to Sir Joseph Petavel at the National Physical Laboratory. That October, Roberts took up a position there as a junior assistant in the Heat Section of the Physics Department, which was then headed by G. W. C. Kaye, where he studied the thermal properties of metallic crystals, publishing two papers on the thermal conductivity and expansion of bismuth. The following year, Roberts was promoted to Scientific Officer, and received his PhD from Cambridge.

On 5 June 1924 Roberts married Margaret Sylvia Whyte, a divorcee and the daughter of the wallpaper magnate Harold Sanderson of Arthur Sanderson & Sons, in a Kensington, London, registry office. They had two daughters. In 1924 he developed a pain in his hip which was initially diagnosed as arthritis, but turned out to be tuberculosis, and he was hospitalised in a sanatorium in Switzerland for the next four years. While there he wrote a book, Heat and Thermodynamics (1928).

His position at the National Physical Laboratory could not be held for this long, but on his return to England in 1928 he became a Moseley Research Student of the Royal Society at the Cavendish Laboratory. He became interested in functioning of the Pirani gauge, with which he investigated the thermal conductivities of gases, and of the heat conveyed to a gas by a hot wire. In 1933 he joined the Colloid Science Laboratory at Cambridge as its assistant director of research. He conducted ground-breaking research into the energy exchanges between hot metal surfaces and gases in contact with them, particularly hydrogen, and later oxygen. It was for this work that Cambridge awarded him a ScD and he was elected a Fellow of the Royal Society in 1942.

Soon after the outbreak of the Second World War in 1939, Roberts became a scientific advisor to the Royal Navy, working at the Naval Research Establishment on the River Clyde in Scotland and then at the Naval Research Establishment on the River Forth, where he developed techniques for degaussing ships to avoid magnetic mines, and for minesweeping. In 1942 he was appointed the chief scientist at the Anti-Submarine Experimental Establishment in Fairlie, Scotland. In 1943 he travelled to the United States to promote greater cooperation between scientists working for the two nations' navies. He was elected a Fellow of Christ's College, Cambridge and harboured an ambition to one day direct the Mond Cryogenic Laboratory, but in March 1944 he developed a glandular infection, and then pneumonia, from which he did not recover. He died in Marylebone, London, on 26 April 1944, and his remains were cremated. He was survived by his wife and two daughters.
