= Richard Williams (1802–1842) =

Welsh Calvinistic Methodist minister and author

- Born: 31 January 1802; Llanbrynmair, Montgomeryshire, Wales
- Died: 30 August 1842 (aged 40); Liverpool, England
- Occupations: Calvinistic Methodist minister and author

Richard Williams (31 January 1802 – 30 August 1842) was a Welsh Calvinistic Methodist minister and author.

== Biography ==
Williams was born on 31 January 1802 at Winllan, Llanbrynmair, Montgomeryshire, Wales. His brother William Williams was a poet. Richard was taught at a school ran by his uncle John Roberts, and also at a school ran by William Owen. Afterward, Williams was educated at schools in Birmingham, Wrexham, and Liverpool.

Williams later founded his own school in Liverpool and, in 1830, he married Mary, daughter of Reverend Thomas Hughes. In 1835, Williams became an ordained Calvinistic Methodist minister. He was minister of the Rose Place Chapel at Mulberry Street in Liverpool. He was a founder of the Calvinistic Methodist Foreign Mission Society and served as the committee's first chairman.

Williams wrote Y Pregethwr a'r Gwrandawr (The Preacher and the Listener). It was originally published in Y Drysorfa as part of a series. He also edited a collection of hymns in 1841 with Rev. Joseph Williams. Richard died on 30 August 1842 in Liverpool.
