= John Roberts (Presbyterian) =

Welsh Presbyterian minister

John Roberts (16 October 1880 – 29 July 1959) was a Welsh Presbyterian Church of Wales minister and historian.

== Life ==
Roberts was born in Porthmadog, Caernarfonshire, north-west Wales on 16 October 1880. He was educated at the grammar school in Bala where his contemporaries included Robert Thomas Jenkins. He then studied classics followed by theology at Jesus College, Oxford. He was then married in 1903 and was ordained as a minister in the Presbyterian Church of Wales in 1905, serving first in Aberdyfi before moving to Liverpool in 1906 and Cardiff in 1913. Whilst in Cardiff, he was heavily involved in fundraising for the church, and eventually resigned in 1938 to become the full-time secretary of the Sustentation Fund for South Wales, later of the Fund for the whole denomination, in which capacity he ensured that the church and its ministers were on a firmer financial basis than before. He also campaigned at a national level on behalf of the people of south Wales, leading a group to London in 1932 to see the Prime Minister Stanley Baldwin about the poverty of the valleys. He was awarded an honorary doctorate of divinity by the University of Wales in 1954. He died in Cardiff on 29 July 1959.

Roberts was a popular preacher and was a respected historian of the Welsh Presbyterian church, with his Welsh-language history Methodistiaeth Calfinaidd Cymru ("Welsh Calvinistic Methodism") (1931) being published in an English translation 1934; the works are regarded as classics.
