= John Roberts (Lancashire cricketer) =

English cricketer (1933–2019)

Personal information
- Full name: John Francis Esdale Roberts
- Born: 4 March 1933; Kearsley, Lancashire, England
- Died: 2 December 2019 (aged 86)
- Batting: Right-handed
- Bowling: Right-arm medium-fast

Domestic team information
- Years: Team
- 1957: Lancashire

Career statistics
Competition	First-class
Matches	2
Runs scored	5
Batting average	2.50
100s/50s	–/–
Top score	5
Balls bowled	156
Wickets	–
Bowling average	–
5 wickets in innings	–
10 wickets in match	–
Best bowling	–
Catches/stumpings	–/–
- Source: Cricinfo, 12 October 2011

John Francis Esdale Roberts (4 March 1933 – 2 December 2019) was an English cricketer. Roberts was a right-handed batsman who bowled right-arm medium-fast. He was born at Kearsley, Lancashire.

He made two first-class appearances for Lancashire in 1957. The first of these came against Surrey in the County Championship. His second appearance came against Cambridge University. Roberts had little success in either match, scoring 5 runs and taking no wickets.
