= Richard Roberts (Gruffydd Rhisiart) =

Welsh writer and preacher

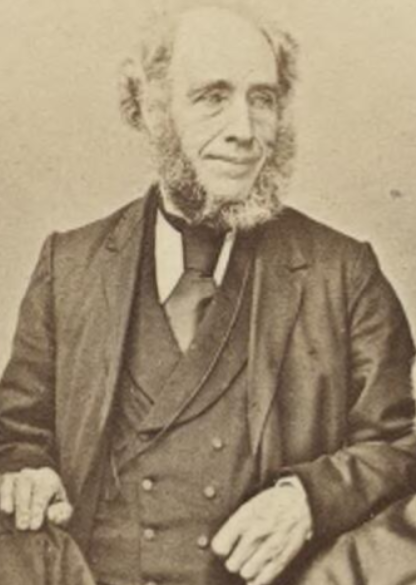
- Roberts, c. 1874
- Born: 5 November 1809; Llanbrynmair, Montgomeryshire, Wales
- Died: 25 July 1883 (aged 73)
- Occupations: Writer and preacher

Richard Roberts (5 November 1809 – 25 July 1883), also known as Gruffydd Rhisiart or G.R., was a Welsh writer and independent preacher.

== Biography ==
Roberts was born on 5 November 1809 at Diosg, Llanbrynmair. He was the youngest brother of Samuel Roberts. He was brought up as a farmer, and had few educational advantages, but, like his brothers, had a strong literary taste. He wrote a good deal both of prose and verse for "Y Cronicl" and other magazines, and was the author of a Welsh novel, entitled "Jeffrey Jarman, y Meddwyn Diwygiedig" ("The Reformed Drunkard"), Machynlleth, 1855, 8vo. Of his poetry, "Can y Glep" ("The Gossip") (which appeared in "Y Cronicl" for November 1855) is a good specimen of Welsh satire. He married, 3 February 1853, Anne Jones, of Castell Bach Rhayader, Radnorshire, who emigrated with him in 1856 to Tennessee, where he settled as a farmer. Returning to this country in September 1870, he retired to Brynmair, and frequently preached among the congregationalists. He died on 25 July 1883; his wife died on 5 May 1886; their only child, Margaret, married Mr. John Williams of Conway. A volume of sermons and dialogues by himself and his brother "J. R." was published posthumously under the title, "Pwlpud Conwy" (Bala, 1888, 8vo).
