= John Roberts (urban planner) =

British urban planner

John Roberts (1929–1992) was the founder of TEST (Transport & Environment Studies) consultancy, London. Roberts was one of the pioneers of sustainable transport planning in the UK. He was one of the first to introduce the idea of traffic calming from continental Europe. Roberts founded TEST in 1972 and led over 150 projects resulting in reports, books, and papers. He advised both Prince Charles and John Prescott amongst others. Prior to founding TEST, Roberts worked as an architect for the Greater London Council, Oxford Polytechnic and Llewelyn-Davies Weeks.

== Publications ==
- Travel Sickness: The Need for a Sustainable Transport Policy for Britain, 1992, John Roberts, Johanna Cleary, Kerry Hamilton and Judith Hannah, Lawrence & Wishart, London ISBN 0-85315-748-0
- TEST paper: A Comment on Transport Policy In Britain, John Roberts, Transport and Environment Studies (TEST), doi:10.1080/02697459208722845, Planning Practice and Research, Volume 7, Issue 2 Summer 1992, pages 29 – 32
- The Economic Case for Green Modes, Roberts, J, In: The Greening of Urban Transport: Planning for Walking and Cycling in Western Cities, Tolley, R (ed). Chapter 2., Wiley (1997) ISBN 0-471-96993-1
- User Friendly Cities: What Britain Can Learn from Mainland Europe, John Roberts, TEST (Transport and Environment Studies), 1989
- Trouble in Store? Retail Location Policy in Britain and Germany, TEST, 1989 ISBN 0-905545-23-0
- Quality Streets: How Traditional Urban Centres Benefit from Traffic Calming. TEST, 1988 ISBN 0-905545-19-2
- DIY Outlets: In or Out of Town?, John Roberts, Sarah Wenden, International Journal of Retail & Distribution Management, 1984, Volume: 12, Issue: 6, Page: 47 - 52, doi:10.1108/eb018255, Publisher: MCB UP Ltd
- Pedestrian Precincts in Britain, John Roberts, Transport and Environment Studies (1981)
- Buses and Pedestrian Areas: a Report for London Transport, by John Roberts of Transport & Environment Studies, Publisher: London : London Transport, 1981., ISBN 0-85329-110-1
- Europe 1990: Patterns of Environmental Protection and Planning, John Elkington and John Roberts, for Hudson Research Europe, Paris, 1978
- The Impact of Traffic Policies in Singapore: The Impact of Traffic Policies on Pedestrians, McGlynn, R.F. and John Roberts. 1977, Traffic Engineering and Control 18: 299-302.
- The Impact of Traffic Policies in Singapore: Attitudes to Traffic Policies in Singapore, McGlynn, R.F. and John Roberts. 1977. Traffic Engineering and Control 18: 357-361.
- The Pedestrian: Planning and Research, John Elkington, Roger McGlynn and John Roberts, Transport and Environment Studies (TEST), London., 1976, ISBN 0-905545-01-X
