= John Roberts (footballer, born 1887) =

English footballer

Personal information
- Date of birth: 14 December 1887
- Place of birth: Liverpool, England

Senior career*
Years	Team	Apps	(Gls)
1912–1913	Milan	18	(1)
1913–1916	Modena	25	(7)
Total		43	(8)
- * Club domestic league appearances and goals

John Roberts (14 December 1887 – after 1915) was an English professional footballer who played in Italy between 1912 and 1916 for Milan and Modena.
