= John Roberts (footballer, born 1881) =

Australian rules footballer

Personal information
- Full name: John Thomas Roberts
- Born: 8 February 1881; Haddon, Victoria
- Died: 10 January 1956 (aged 74); Melbourne, Victoria

Playing career^{1}
Years	Club	Games (Goals)
1908	South Melbourne	2 (0)
- ^{1} Playing statistics correct to the end of 1908.

John Thomas Roberts (8 February 1881 – 10 January 1956) was an Australian rules footballer who played with South Melbourne in the Victorian Football League (VFL).
