= Jack Roberts (footballer, born 1935) =

Australian rules footballer

Personal information
- Full name: Jack Roberts
- Born: 6 May 1935 (age 91)
- Height: 170 cm (5 ft 7 in)
- Weight: 74 kg (163 lb)

Playing career^{1}
Years	Club	Games (Goals)
1957–58	St Kilda	5 (1)
- ^{1} Playing statistics correct to the end of 1958.

Jack Roberts (born 6 May 1935) is a former Australian rules footballer who played with St Kilda in the Victorian Football League (VFL).
