= Cobham Intermediate School =

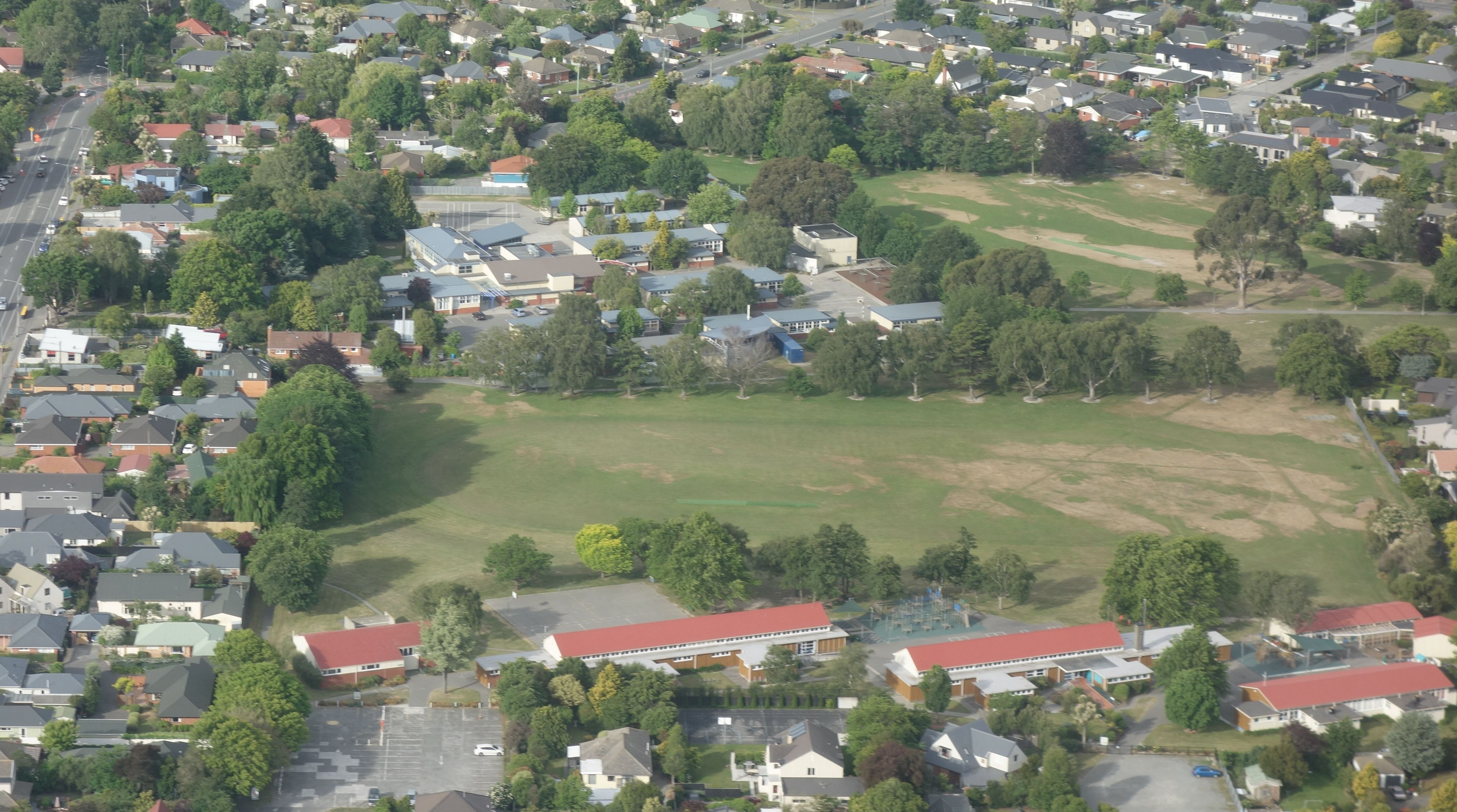
- Cobham Intermediate School in the centre; Burnside Primary in the foreground

Location
- 294 Ilam Road; Burnside; Christchurch, New Zealand; 43.5108°S 172.5843°E

Information
- Type: State co-ed intermediate (years 7 and 8)
- Motto: Achieving For Life
- Ministry of Education Institution no.: 3323
- Principal: Eddie Norgate (2016–present)
- Enrolment: 670 (July 2026)
- Socio-economic decile: 8

Cobham Intermediate School is a state intermediate school in northwestern Christchurch, New Zealand, in the suburb of Burnside.

Their 4 main values are:

resilience | ngākau mārohirohi

responsibility | ngākau whai tikanga

positivity | ngākaupai

respect | ngākau whakaute

These values are abbreviated as “3RP@C”.

Cobham was originally named Fendalton Intermediate. However, there was confusion between the school and Fendalton Open Air School, so the governor-general of New Zealand, Viscount Cobham, allowed the school to use his name. At the end of term 1 in 2011 long-running principal Trevor Beaton left Cobham Intermediate to retire. Scott Thelning from Mt. Pleasant School took over as principal in Term 3, 2011.

In March 2018 Cobham student Maia Devereaux invited Women's Minister Julie Anne Genter to come and talk about the gender pay gap to the room 11 and 12 students.

The school went through major renovations between 2020 and 2024, as all buildings were demolished and replaced by larger hapori classroom buildings—the names being Puneke, Takere and Kei—and a dedicated STEAM unit.

== Cobham today ==
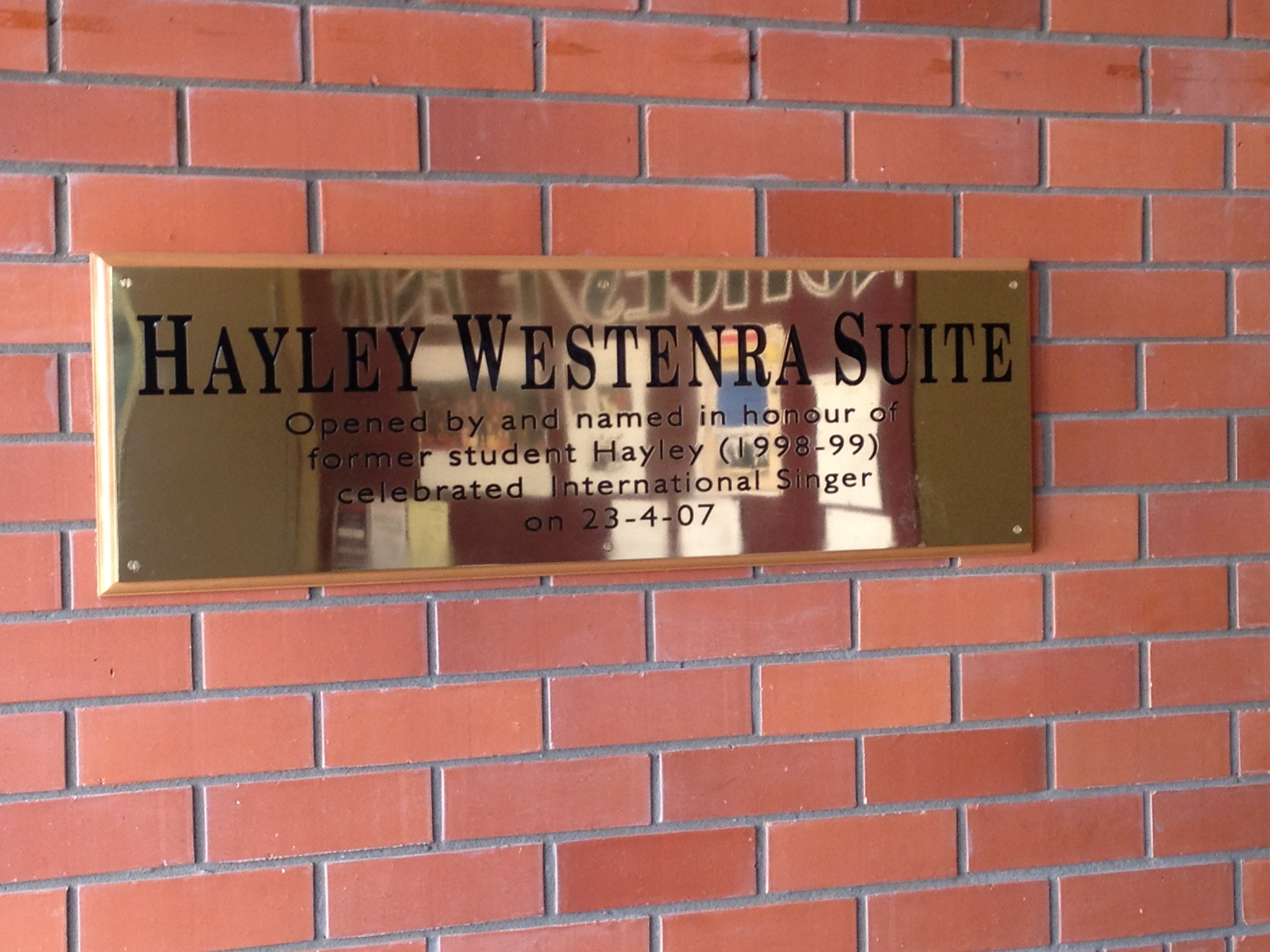
The Hayley Westenra Suite commemorates the famous singer

Cobham is currently the largest intermediate school in the South Island and has a total attendance of 670 students.

== Achievements ==
In 2005, Cobham won the Cantamath competition (a mathematics competition for schools around the Canterbury region) in both the year 7 and 8 competition. Cobham also has a chess club, which places highly in the Canterbury Interschool Chess Tournament, held annually in Christchurch. Many musicians and singers from this school participate in the Lions Primary School Music Festival.

== Notable alumni ==
- Corey Anderson – New Zealand cricketer
- Tim Batt – New Zealand comedian
- Will Jordan, rugby union player
- John Key – New Zealand Prime Minister (2008–2016)
- Tom Latham – New Zealand cricketer
- Frankie Mackay – New Zealand cricketer
- Hayley Westenra – New Zealand pop opera singer
