= Burnside Park, Christchurch =

Sports Ground in Christchurch, New Zealand

Coordinates: 43°30′20.02″S 172°33′54.97″E

Burnside Park
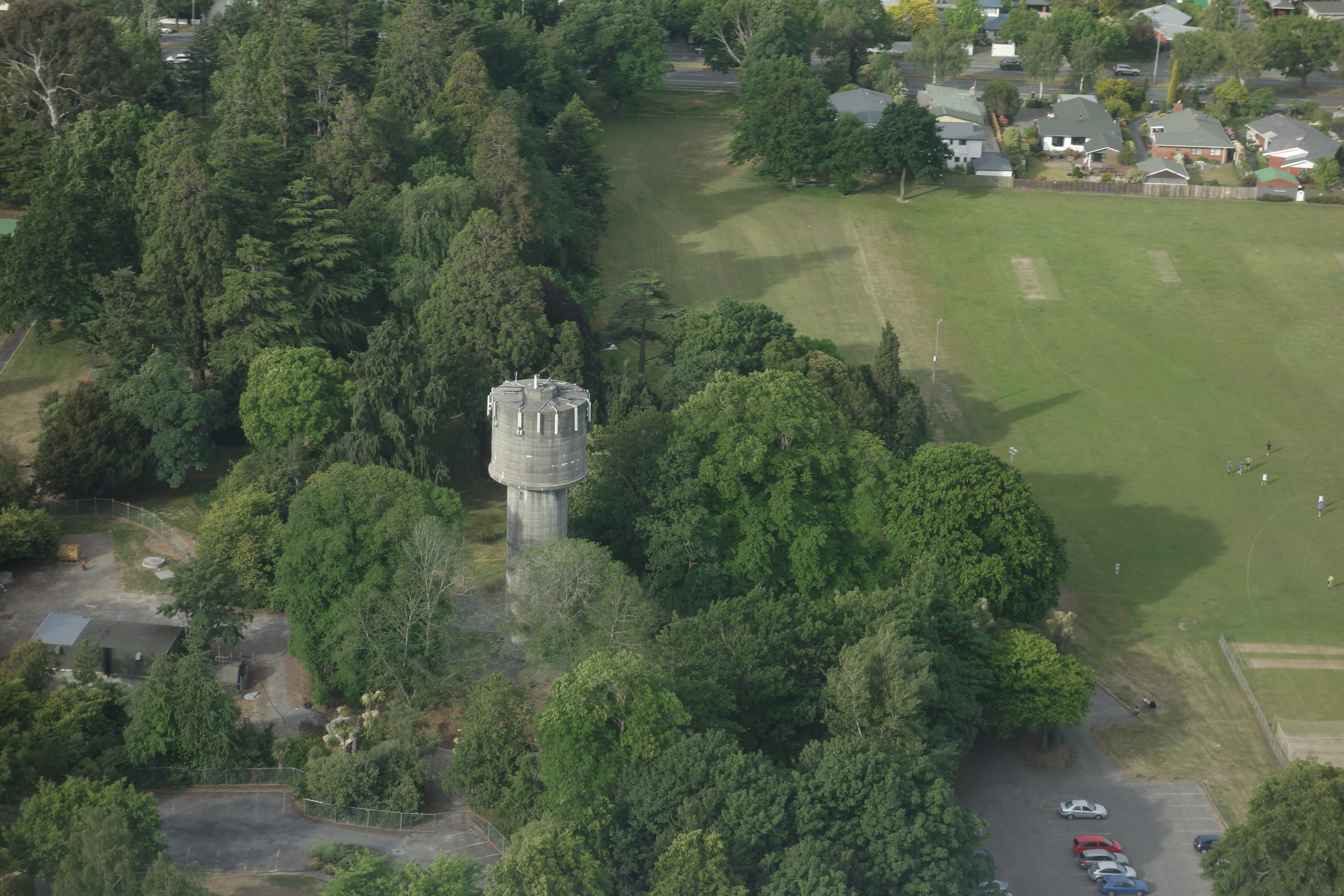
- Interactive map of Burnside Park

Ground information
- Location: Burnside, New Zealand
- Country: New Zealand
- Establishment: 1974 (first recorded match)

Team information
Canterbury	(1991)
- As of 1 November 2011; Source: Ground profile

Burnside Park is a cricket ground in Burnside, Canterbury, New Zealand. The first recorded match on the ground came when Canterbury Women played Auckland Women in 1974. The ground later held its only first-class match in 1991 when Canterbury played Central Districts in the 1991/92 Shell Trophy, with the match ending in a 3 wicket victory for Canterbury.

It is the home ground of the Burnside West Christchurch University Cricket Club.

== Facilities ==
The park includes various facilities including:

- Tennis Courts
- Exercise Machines
- Playground
- Rugby pitches

== Water tower ==
The park has a concrete water tower at 336 Avonhead Road. It was constructed in either the late 1970s or 1980s and is no longer used for water storage, but is now used for telecommunications.
