= John Roberts (Somerset cricketer) =

English cricketer

Personal information
- Full name: John Kelvin Roberts
- Born: 9 October 1949 (age 77); Liverpool, England
- Nickname: J.K
- Batting: Right-handed
- Bowling: Left-arm medium
- Role: Bowler

Domestic team information
- Years: Team
- 1969–1970: Somerset
- FC debut: 4 June 1969 Somerset v West Indians
- Last FC: 31 July 1970 Somerset v Worcestershire
- LA debut: 15 June 1969 Somerset v Surrey
- Last LA: 2 August 1970 Somerset v Gloucestershire

Career statistics
Competition	First-class	List A
Matches	8	11
Runs scored	3	13
Batting average	1.00	13.00
100s/50s	0/0	0/0
Top score	2*	12*
Balls bowled	942	447
Wickets	15	13
Bowling average	32.33	22.84
5 wickets in innings	0	0
10 wickets in match	0	0
Best bowling	4/38	4/18
Catches/stumpings	2/–	2/–
- Source: CricketArchive, 31 December 2009

John Kelvin Roberts (born 9 October 1949) played first-class and List A cricket for Somerset in the 1969 and 1970 seasons. He was born at Liverpool in 1949.

A right-handed tail-end batsman and a left-arm medium pace bowler, Roberts was one of several young players brought in by Somerset in the 1969 season – others included Brian Rose and Peter Denning – as the team set out to rebuild after the departure of much of the successful side of the 1960s. Roberts played in six County Championship matches, with his best bowling performance being four for 38 runs against Yorkshire at Headingley, the match in which Greg Chappell also achieved his career-best bowling performance. Roberts had more success in one-day cricket, playing in nine of Somerset's games in the inaugural season of the Sunday league competition; his best performance was four for 18 against Sussex, the match being played at Torquay, the first "home" fixture outside Somerset since the county club was founded, also at Torquay, in 1875. Note:Somerset County Cricket Club was founded after a match at Sidmouth. See Somerset County Cricket Club

Wisden in its review of Somerset in 1969 noted Roberts as a promising player: he "displayed a cool head and improved steadily during the year," it said. But in 1970, Somerset recruited other bowlers and Roberts played in only two first-class and two one-day matches, with limited success. He did not appear in the first team after the 1970 season, but remained in the county's second eleven through 1971.
