= Jonathan M. Roberts =

American writer

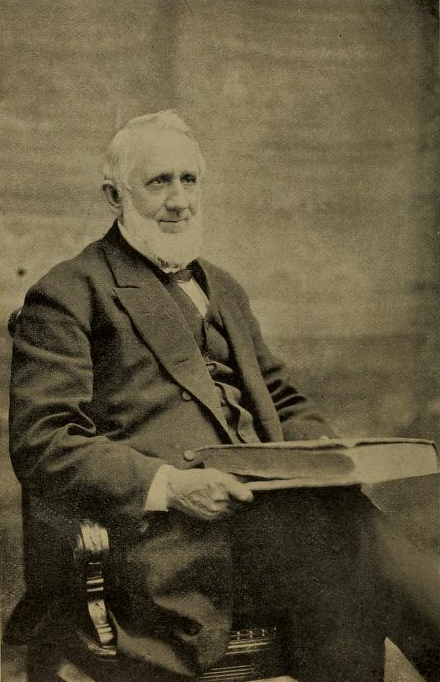
Jonathan M. Roberts

Jonathan Manning Roberts (December 7, 1821 - February 28, 1888) was an American lawyer, spiritualist medium and writer.

Roberts authored the book Antiquity Unveiled which was published in 1892. It claims to be an account of spirit messages proving Christianity "an offspring of more ancient religions". He was a proponent of the Christ myth theory. He practised law prior to becoming an editor for the weekly spiritualist journal Mind and Matter.

Roberts was a member of the abolitionist party prior to the American Civil War, and a Republican afterward. His father was a member of the U.S. Senate.

== Publications ==
- Antiquity Unveiled: Ancient Voices from the Spirit Realms Proving Christianity to be of Heathen Origin (1892)
- Apollonius of Tyana, Identified as the Christian Jesus (1894)
