= John Roberts (footballer, born 1858) =

Welsh footballer

Personal information
- Date of birth: 1858
- Place of birth: Wales

International career
Years	Team	Apps	(Gls)
1881–1882	Wales	2	(0)

John Roberts (born 1858) was a Welsh international footballer. He was part of the Wales national football team between 1881 and 1882, playing 2 matches. He played his first match on 14 March 1881 against Scotland and his last match on 25 March 1882 against Scotland.

== See also ==
- List of Wales international footballers (alphabetical)
