= John Roberts (footballer, born 1891) =

Scottish footballer

Personal information
- Date of birth: 2 November 1891
- Place of birth: Anderston, Scotland
- Position: Centre half

Senior career*
Years	Team	Apps	(Gls)
1913–1921	Queen's Park	71	(1)
- * Club domestic league appearances and goals

John T. Roberts MM was a Scottish amateur footballer who played as a centre half in the Scottish League for Queen's Park.

== Personal life ==
Prior to the First World War, Roberts worked as a drapery warehouseman. After Britain's entry into the war in August 1914, Roberts enlisted in the Highland Light Infantry and was serving as a sergeant when he won the Military Medal for "gallant conduct" on the first day on the Somme in July 1916. During the course of the action he was shot in the shoulder and recovered back in Britain.
