= John Roberts (soccer, born 1944) =

Australian footballer

Personal information
- Full name: John Thomas Roberts
- Date of birth: 24 March 1944 (age 82)
- Place of birth: Cessnock, NSW, Australia
- Height: 6 ft 1/2 in (1.84 m)
- Position: Goalkeeper

Youth career
- Aberdare Rangers
- Cessnock East End

Senior career*
Years	Team	Apps	(Gls)
?–1964	Cessnock		
1964–1966	APIA		
1966–1968	Blackburn Rovers	3	(0)
1967–1968	→Chesterfield (loan)	46	(0)
1968–1970	Bradford City	44	(0)
1971–1972	Southend United	47	(0)
1972	Northampton Town	13	(0)
1973–1974	APIA		

International career
1965	Australia	1	(0)
1965	Australia B	3	(0)
- * Club domestic league appearances and goals

John Thomas Roberts (born 24 March 1944) is an Australian former soccer player who played the majority of his career in England. He played once in a full international match for the Australia national soccer team.

== Early life ==
Roberts was born and raised in Aberdare, a suburb of Cessnock.

== Playing career ==
=== Club career ===
Roberts began playing in Cessnock initially for Aberdare Rangers and later Cessnock East End. He switched from inside forward to goalkeeper in his mid-teens.

He played for Cessnock after graduating from youth football. In 1963, he was selected in a Northern New South Wales team that played a series of interstate matches. He transferred to APIA Leichhardt in the New South Wales State League in mid-1964. Soon after arriving at APIA, Roberts found himself the first-choice goalkeeper when Adauto Iglesias was injured. He played at APIA in 1964 and 1965.

In late 1965, he travelled to England to trial with Football League Division One team Chelsea. Roberts had been identified as a talent by manager Tommy Docherty in Australia's matches against the London team in mid-1965. Roberts made his debut for Chelsea in a Football Combination match against Coventry in January 1966. At the end of the trial, APIA asked for a $20,000 transfer fee, which Chelsea refused to pay.

He joined Blackburn Rovers in April 1966, playing three matches during the 1965–66 season while on trial. He returned to APIA where he played the remainder of the 1966 season. In August 1966, Roberts signed a two-year contract with Blackburn Rovers. He was sent out on loan in August 1967 to Chesterfield in the Football League Fourth Division, where he played 46 matches during the 1967–1968 season.

In 1968, he was signed by Bradford City; there he made 44 appearances between 1968 and 1970, and played in the team that won promotion from the Fourth Division to the Third Division in 1969. In early 1971 he transferred to Southend United, and at the end of the 1971–1972 season moved to Northampton Town, staying there for one season and playing 13 times.

=== International career ===
Roberts played one full international match for Australia in 1965 against North Korea in Phnom Penh. The match was the first of two 1966 World Cup Qualifying matches against North Korea. After Australia conceded six goals, he was replaced by Bill Rorke, who had been a teammate in junior football at Aberdare Rangers. He played three matches for an Australian XI in 1965 against Chelsea (two matches) and IFK Stockholm.
