= William Williams (Gwilym Cyfeiliog) =

Welsh poet and hymnwriter

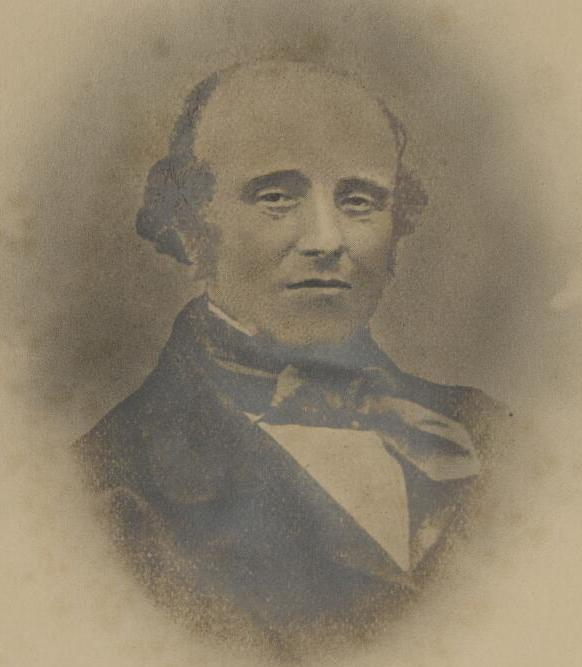
- Born: 4 January 1801; Llanbrynmair, Montgomeryshire, Wales
- Died: 3 June 1876 (aged 75); Llanbrynmair, Montgomeryshire, Wales
- Occupations: Poet and hymnwriter

William Williams (4 January 1801 – 3 June 1876), also known as Gwilym Cyfeiliog, was a Welsh poet and hymnwriter.

== Biography ==
Williams was born on 4 January 1801 at Winllan, Llanbrynmair, Montgomeryshire, Wales. His brother Richard Williams (1802–1842) was a noted minister and author. William was taught at a school ran by his uncle John Roberts, and also at a school ran by William Owen. Williams then returned home to work on a farm and flannel mill owned by his father.

In 1822, Williams came into possession of land, houses, and a flannel mill at Bont Dolgadfan, Llanbrynmair. He spent time as a "vestry clerk, assistant overseer, and parish registrar." He was married three times and had ten children total, including the antiquarian/lawyer Richard Williams (1835–1906).

Beginning in 1823, Williams' poetry was published in Y Dysgedydd, Goleuad Cymru, Y Drysorfa, Seren Gomer, and the Gwyliedydd. In 1823, his awdl titled "The founding of St. David's College" won second place at the Carmarthen eisteddfod behind Daniel Ddu o Geredigion. Williams was considered a good writer of englynion. His hymn called "Caed trefn i faddau pechod yn yr Iawn" became so well known that it was translated into the Khasi language in India.

Williams died on 3 June 1876 at Bont Dolgadfan, Llanbrynmair. In 1878, his son Richard, noted above, published a collection of his father's works called Caniadau Cyfeiliog.
