= Daniel Jenkins Williams =

American minister and historian

- Born: December 22, 1874; Genesee Depot, Wisconsin, U.S.
- Died: May 29, 1952 (aged 77); Milwaukee, Wisconsin, U.S.
- Occupations: Minister and historian

Daniel Jenkins Williams (December 22, 1874 – May 29, 1952) was an American Calvinistic Methodist minister and historian of Welsh descent.

== Biography ==
Williams was born on December 22, 1874, in Genesee Depot, Wisconsin, the son of Robert H. Williams and Jane Mary (née Jenkins). His father was born in Wales while his mother was born in Wisconsin to Welsh immigrants. Williams graduated from the University of Wisconsin with a Bachelor of Arts in 1899, and a Master of Arts in 1900. He earned a Bachelor of Divinity from Union Theological Seminary in 1903, a Doctor of Philosophy from Ohio State University in 1914, and a Doctor of Divinity from Carroll College in 1918.

Williams was a pastor of various churches in Wisconsin, Ohio, and Iowa from 1905 to 1933. He was also a winter preacher at a few small churches in Florida. He was fluent in Welsh, and spent time preaching in Wales as well. Williams was the moderator of the Presbyterian Synod of Wisconsin from 1937 until his death on May 29, 1952, in Milwaukee, Wisconsin.

Williams wrote:

- The Welsh of Columbus, Ohio; A Study in Adjustment and Assimilation (1913)
- The Welsh Community of Waukesha County, Wisconsin (1926)
- 100 Years of Welsh Calvinistic Methodism in America (1937)
