= Jack Roberts (footballer, born 1873) =

English footballer

Personal information
- Full name: Jack Roberts
- Date of birth: 1873
- Place of birth: Wednesbury, England
- Position: Inside forward

Senior career*
Years	Team	Apps	(Gls)
1892–1893	Swan Athletic (West Bromwich)		
1893–1894	Tipton Excelsior		
1894–1895	Wolverhampton Wanderers	1	(0)
1896	Ewells (Wednesbury)		
Total		1	(0)
- * Club domestic league appearances and goals

Jack Roberts (1873 – after 1895) was an English footballer who played in the Football League for Wolverhampton Wanderers. Roberts' only appearance for Wolves was in a 0–0 draw with Stoke on 24 November 1894.
