= John Roberts (1804–1884) =

Welsh writer and independent minister

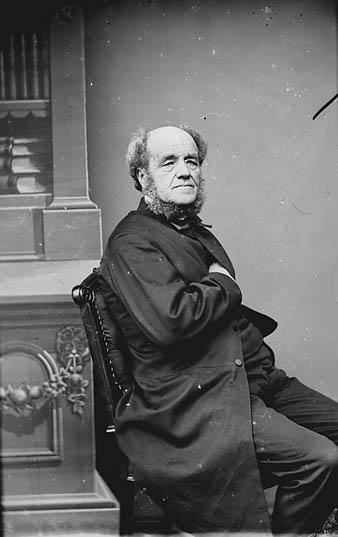
- Roberts by John Thomas (1869)
- Born: 5 November 1804; Llanbrynmair, Montgomeryshire, Wales
- Died: 7 September 1884 (aged 79)
- Occupations: Writer and independent minister

John Roberts (5 November 1804 – 7 September 1884), better known as J.R., was a Welsh writer and independent minister.

== Biography ==
Roberts was the second son of John Roberts (1767–1834), and brother of Samuel Roberts (1800–1885). He was born on 5 November 1804 at the old chapel-house, Llanbrynmair, Montgomeryshire, and was educated chiefly by his father. But after commencing to preach among the independents about 1830, he was admitted in March 1831 a student at the independent academy at Newtown, where he remained a little over three years. On 8 October 1835 he was ordained co-pastor with his elder brother, Samuel, of the church at Llanbrynmair and its numerous branches, a position which he held until 1838, excepting one year (1838–9), which he spent as pastor of churches at Llansantsior and Moelfra, near Conway. He subsequently held the pastorates of Ruthin (1848–1857), of the Welsh church, Aldersgate Street, London (1857–1860), and of Conway from 1860 until his death. In his earlier years Roberts had a great reputation as an eloquent preacher, but his fame rests chiefly upon his writings, especially in connection with "Y Cronicl," a cheap monthly magazine of great popularity, which he edited in succession to his brother Samuel from 1857 until his death. He was also a fair poet, and one of his hymns (commencing "Eisteddai teithiwr blin") is probably unsurpassed in the Welsh language. He was engaged in numerous denominational controversies.

Roberts died on 7 September 1884. He married, on 6 June 1838, Ann, daughter of the Rev. Thomas Jones of Llansantsior; she died, without issue, on 26 January 1871. His brothers Samuel and Richard, on their return from Tennessee in 1870, went to live with him at his residence, Brynmair, near Conway, and all three were buried at the cemetery there, where a monument provided by public subscription was erected. A monumental tablet was also placed in Llanbrynmair chapel.

Roberts's chief works were:

- "Traethodau Pregethau ac Ymddiddanion," Dolgelly, 1854, 8vo.
- "Y Gyfrol Olaf o Bregethau" (a selection of forty sermons), Bala, 1876, 8vo.
- "Hanesion y Beibl ar ffurf ymddiddanion," Bala, 1880, 8vo.
- "Dadleuon a Darnau i'w Hadrodd," Bala, 1891.
- He edited "Pwlpud Conwy" (a selection of Sermons by Roberts and his brother Richard, published posthumously), Bala, 1888, 8vo.
