= Probus Clubs =

Clubs for retired or semi-retired people

Probus Clubs are clubs for retired or semi-retired people from all walks of life.

== Organisation ==
Probus is a local, national, and international association of retired people who come together in non-political, non-sectarian, non-profit, autonomous clubs which provide regular opportunities for members to meet others in similar circumstances, with similar levels of interest, make new friends, and maintain and expand their interests. Probus Clubs can be made up of men, women or be mixed (men and women) clubs. It is normal for the spouses of club members and widows of former members to be encouraged to participate in the social activities.

In some places Rotary Clubs sponsor Probus Clubs but many clubs are sponsored by other Probus Clubs.

By 2018, there were over 400,000 members in approximately 4,000 Probus clubs worldwide.

== History ==
The Probus Club movement was formed in the United Kingdom in 1965. The Probus movement had its beginnings in two clubs, both created by members of Rotary Club. The first was found in 1965: Fred Carnill, a member of the Welwyn Garden City Rotary Club, met other retired friends for morning coffee—mostly ex-commuters to London, with professional and business backgrounds. From this, he started a luncheon club. The Rotary Club president arranged the first meeting and 45 men attended. This club was known as ‘The Campus Club’, the name deriving from the fact that the meeting place was facing the centre of town, 'The Campus'.

The Rotary District took up the scheme with the result that Rotary International, Britain and Ireland published a leaflet about the idea to encourage other Rotary Clubs to sponsor a similar club:The Probus club was conceived by three businessmen travelling to London by train. The three; James Raper, Harold Blanchard and Edward Mockett OBE (died 1978) were reaching the point of retirement and realized they had a need for fellowship. Thus in the same time period, September 1965 Harold Blanchard the chairman of Caterham Rotary Club Vocational Service Committee (by now retired from business) presented the idea to the Rotary Club.

The members of the Rotary Club Vocational Service Committee decided to organise a monthly lunch. In February 1966, a meeting was advertised for all retired professional and businessmen aged 60 and over. 42 men turned up. A monthly lunch was arranged, at which the Rotary Club President took the chair until the Club had formed its own rules and committee. The inaugural luncheon of the first Probus Club in the United Kingdom (by that name) was on the 2 March 1966.

In May 1966 a Committee was formed with Harold Blanchard as chairman, who is seen as one of the 'Father Figures' of Probus along with James Raper. The name “Probus” was suggested by a member who took the first three letters from 'PROfessional and BUSiness'. It had the advantage that it was a Latin word from which 'probity' is derived. The Probus Club of Caterham was met with success, and became known among other Rotary Clubs with new clubs being founded.

In 1974, Probus expanded into New Zealand and by 1976 the idea had spread to Australia. The first Probus club for seniors in North America was sponsored by the Rotary Club of Galt in Cambridge, Ontario, Canada in 1987. Currently there are 250+ clubs with more than 36,500 members in Canada.

Although Probus membership has its greatest concentrations in the United Kingdom, Australia and New Zealand, clubs today exist in many parts of the world, including the United States, Belgium, India, South Africa and several other countries in Africa and Asia.

== Structure ==
Probus clubs have no central governing body but in some countries Probus Centres have been established by country to disseminate information and assist clubs. Offices are staffed largely by volunteers and operating costs are met by member contributions.

Probus clubs are local to towns and districts. Typically, meetings are held at regular intervals, normally monthly, with a break (sometimes) during the summer. In some countries Probus Club meetings may consist of a lunch followed by a guest speaker whilst others have the speaker before the meal. Some clubs are run on a more informal basis.

Many Probus club members engage in sporting tournaments, have groups for special interests within the club and enjoy regular outings and holidays at home and abroad.

By 2014 there were around 2000 clubs in the UK alone. Despite equality legislation in the UK, membership of most Probus clubs in the UK is restricted to men only, although wives and partners are welcome on social outings.

In the UK and Ireland, a full colour magazine entitled Probus is published quarterly, free of charge to members and distributed to clubs for the cost of delivery. In May 2014 Probus magazine launched a website for Probus members where every club can create its own page free of charge.

In Canada, meetings are typically held monthly with a guest speaker followed by social time and then updates on club activities. There is a national website supporting all 250+ clubs in Canada.
