= Samuel Roberts (Welsh writer) =

Welsh minister

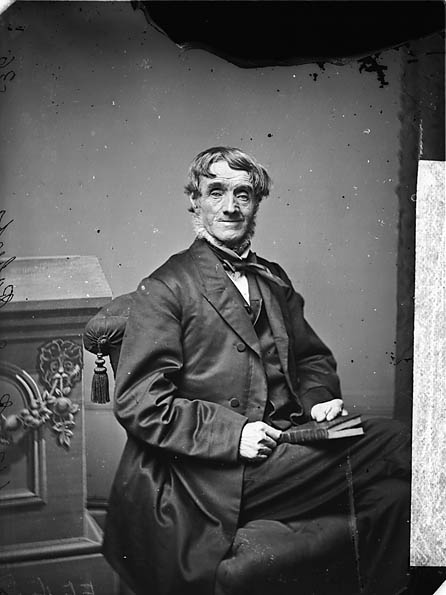
Samuel Roberts

Samuel Roberts (6 March 1800 – 24 September 1885), or simply S.R., was a Welsh minister, known also as a political and economic writer. He was involved in an attempt to set up a Welsh colony in Tennessee, but this was disrupted by the American Civil War.

== Early life ==
He was the eldest son of the minister John Roberts, born on 6 March 1800 at the chapel-house, Llanbrynmair, Montgomeryshire. He was taught until he was ten by his father, and subsequently at a school at Shrewsbury, after which he worked on his father's farm, and acquired a knowledge of shorthand.

After preaching for his father's church around 1819, Roberts went to the dissenting academy kept by George Lewis (1763–1822), first at Llanfyllin, and later at Newtown, where he remained for six years. In April 1826 he was invited to become assistant pastor to his father, and was ordained 15 August 1827. He succeeded in 1834 to the sole charge of the church, together with eight chapels of ease. He attended them all, with the assistance of his brother John Roberts (1804–1884).

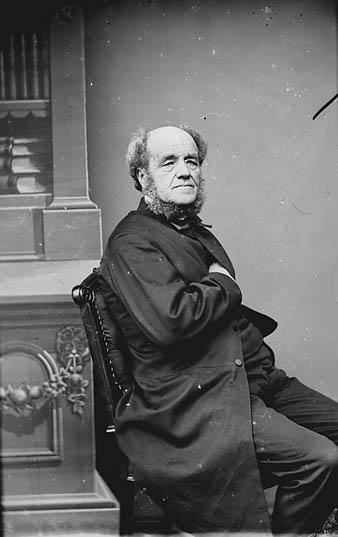
John Roberts (1804–1884)

Roberts advocated free trade, opposing the Corn Laws. He was an early advocate of Welsh disestablishment, and in 1834–35 organised a drive by Welsh independent churches to pay their chapel debts. In 1840–41 he engaged in controversy with Lewis Edwards on presbyterianism and independency. The degree of M.A. was conferred on him by Lane Theological Seminary, Cincinnati in 1841.

== Reformer ==
Roberts was a pacifist, worked for the London Peace Society, and wrote on the peace issue. His Thoughts on War, addressed to People of All Classes (1834) explained that the absolute pacifist line required by the Peace Society of London need not be followed by pacifists in local "auxiliary" societies.

In 1843, Roberts founded a Welsh language journal, Y Cronicl, in which he campaigned for radical causes. In 1857, he travelled to Tennessee in the hope of setting up a Welsh colony there, with a group including his brother Richard Roberts (1810–1883). Both a pacifist and an abolitionist, Roberts was placed in a difficult position by the outbreak of the American Civil War. After ten years, he gave up the attempt and returned to Wales.

He was one of the early advocates of postal reform. The Times newspaper, in an obituary for Samuel Roberts, reported that "he had pleaded before many associations for a low and uniform rate of postage, both inland and foreign, addressing letters on the subject to the Welsh Cymreigyddion societies in 1824 and to the authorities of the General Post Office in 1829 and again in 1836". In 1883 he received a grant of £50 from the Royal Bounty Fund, on the recommendation of the prime minister, William Gladstone, as recognition for his pioneering work in the cause of social progress and postal reform.

== Last years ==
During his later years Roberts concentrated on denominational issues, supporting the congregational principle of self-government against attempts to organise Welsh independent churches on presbyterian lines. In 1868 he started a weekly paper called Y Dydd (published at Dolgelly), which was later amalgamated with Y Tyst. In 1878 he started another paper, Y Celt.

Roberts died unmarried on 24 September 1885, and was buried in Conway cemetery in the same grave as his two brothers, Richard and John, who had predeceased him. A monument provided by public subscription was placed over the grave, and a memorial tablet in Llanbrynmair chapel.
