= Bow shape =

Important aspect of archery

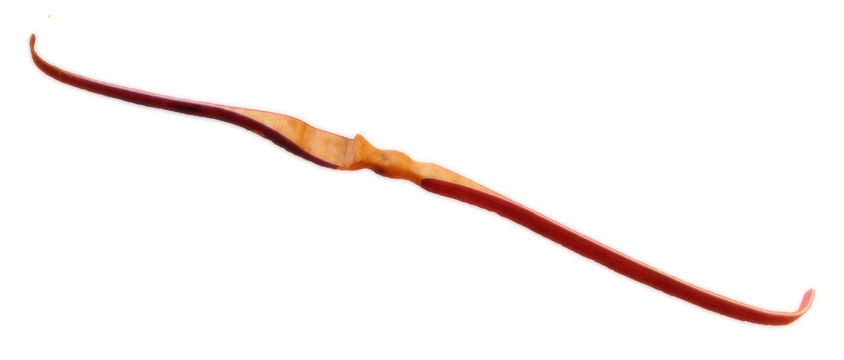
A simple left-handed recurve bow, to be held in the right hand. It is in one piece, with flat limbs made of laminated fiberglass, and a sculpted handle

In archery, the shape of the bow is usually taken to be the view from the side. It is the product of the complex relationship of material stresses, designed by a bowyer. This shape, viewing the limbs, is designed to take into account the construction materials, the performance required, and the intended use of the bow.

There are many different kinds of bow shapes. However, most fall into three main categories: straight, recurve and compound. Straight and recurve are considered traditional bows. If a limb is 'straight' its effective length remains the same as the bow is drawn. That is, the string goes directly to the nock in the strung (braced) position. The materials must withstand these stresses, store the energy, and rapidly give back that energy efficiently. Many bows, especially traditional self bows, are made approximately straight in side-view profile. Longbows as used by English archers in the Middle Ages at such battles as Crecy and Agincourt were straight limb bows. A recurve bow has tips that curve away from the archer when the bow is strung. By one definition, the difference between recurve and other bows is that the string touches a section of the limb when the bow is strung. Recurve bows made out of composite materials were used by, among other groups, the Persians, Parthians, Scythians, Hyksos, Magyars, Bulgars, Huns, Turks, Mongols, and Chinese.

== Design factors ==
If a limb is 'straight' its effective length remains the same as the bow is drawn. That is, the string goes directly to the nock in the strung (braced) position. When the limb is recurved (tip of limb away from the archer), the string touches the limb before it gets to the nock. The effective length of the limb, as the draw commences, is therefore shorter. However, as the bow is drawn, the recurve 'unwinds', the limb becomes effectively longer, and the mechanical advantage of the archer increases. Counter to this, stresses are building up in the materials of the limbs. The belly of the bow (nearest the archer) is in compression, the back (furthest away from the archer) is in tension, and the line between is in shear.

The materials must withstand these stresses, store the energy, and rapidly give back that energy efficiently. The amount of energy stored is determined by the stresses withstood and the shape of the limb, from the unstrung position to strung (consider as pre-stressed), then de-formed further to full draw as the recurve unwinds. These basic principles of changing mechanical advantage, to efficiently store more energy, and deliver it to accelerate the arrow, were clearly understood in antiquity, as shown by the examples that follow.

== Straight bows ==
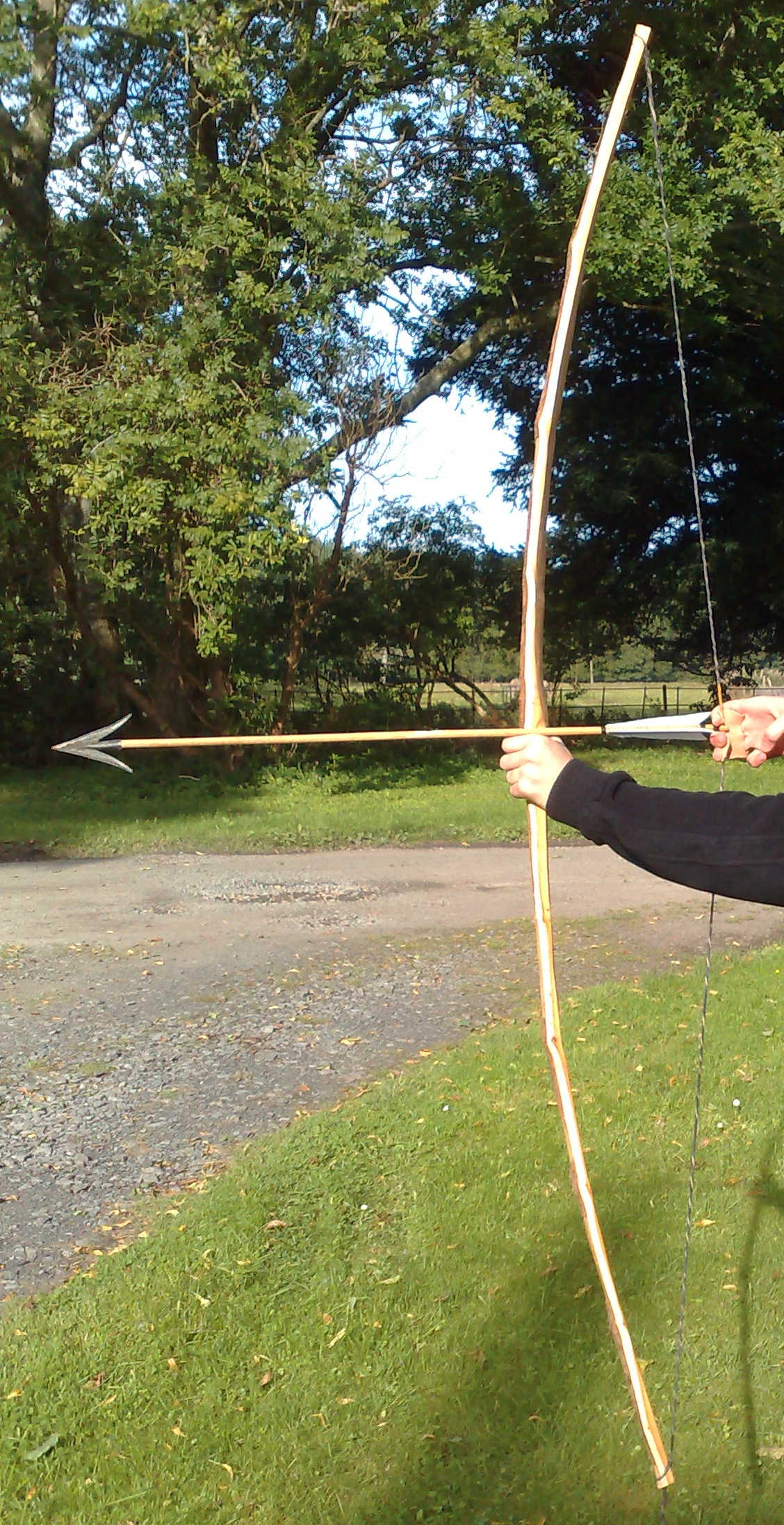
A bow made from straight, but knotty and poor-quality yew

Many bows, especially traditional self bows, are made approximately straight in side-view profile. They are generally referred to as straight, despite the minor curves of natural wood and the "set" or curvature that a wooden bow takes after use. When the archer commences the draw, mechanical advantage is at its greatest and the bow limbs are only pre-stressed to the strung position; therefore drawing weight is at a minimum. However, the drawing weight rapidly increases because mechanical advantage reduces (consider the string is pulling more and more directly on the limbs) and stresses are building up in the limbs. Consequently, drawing weight 'stacks' (very rapidly increases). On release, the reverse happens, the arrow is accelerated by maximum force, and this force rapidly decreases. Hence, the arrow must be sturdy enough to withstand such acceleration and, as the string may decelerate, it is possible for the arrow to leave the string prematurely, which is inefficient.

Longbows as used by English Archers in the Middle Ages at such battles as Crecy and Agincourt were straight limb bows, usually made of yew and with heavy draw weights, used en masse. The arrows were also long and heavy.

== Recurve bows ==
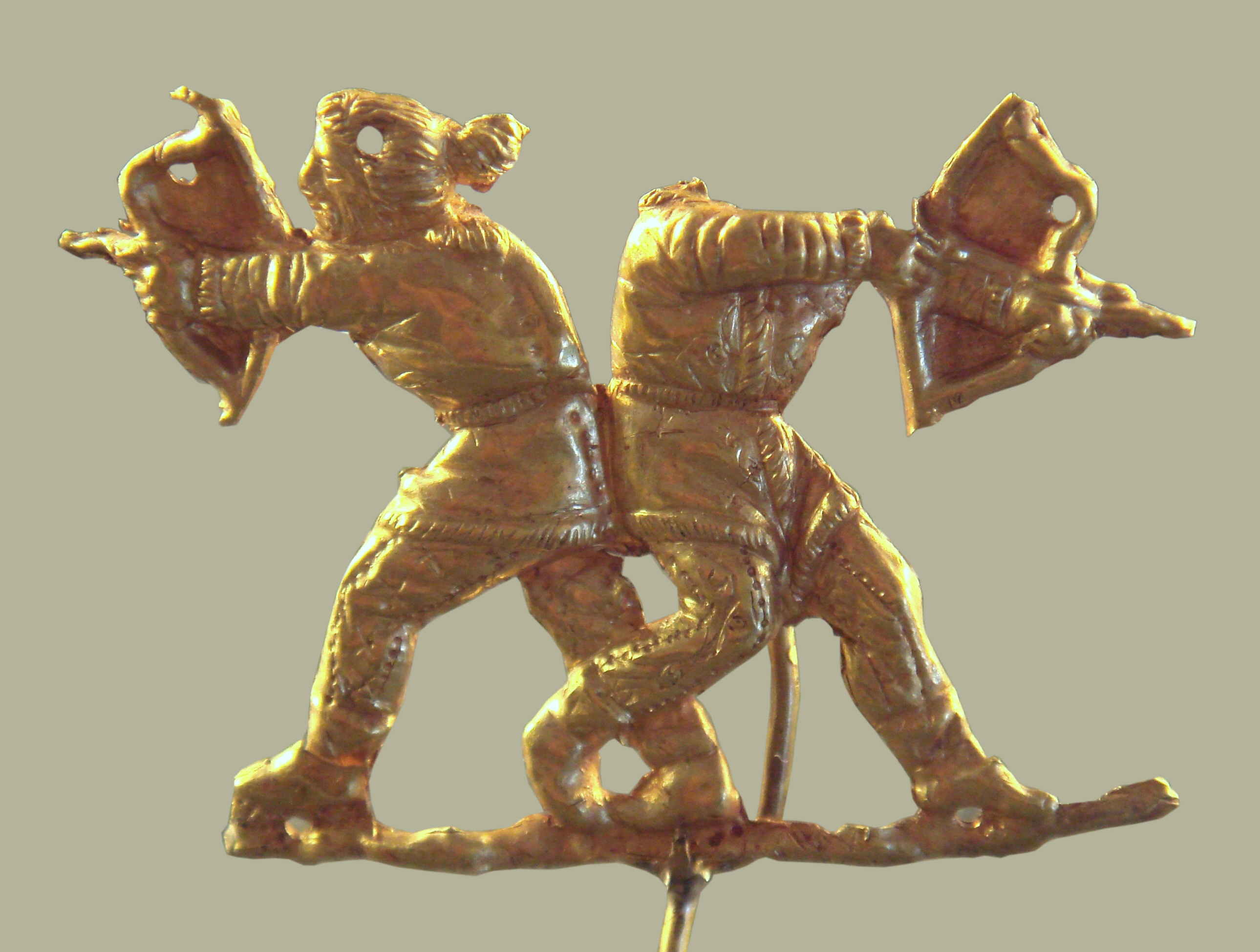
Scythians shooting with bows, Kerch (antique Panticapeum), Ukraine, 4th century BCE

A recurve bow has tips that curve away from the archer when the bow is unstrung. By definition, the difference between recurve and other bows is that the string touches a section of the limb when the bow is strung. A recurve bow stores more energy and delivers energy more efficiently than an equivalent straight-limbed bow, giving a greater amount of energy and speed to the arrow. A recurve will permit a shorter bow than the simple straight limb bow for a given arrow energy and this form was often preferred by archers in environments where long weapons could be cumbersome, such as in brush and forest terrain, or while on horseback.

Recurved limbs also put greater strain on the materials used to make the bow, and they may make more noise with the shot. Extreme recurves make the bow unstable when being strung. An unstrung recurve bow can have a confusing shape and many Native American weapons, when separated from their original owners and cultures, were incorrectly strung backwards and destroyed when attempts were made to shoot them.

The unqualified phrase "recurve bow" or just "a recurve" in modern archery circles usually refers to a typical modern recurve bow, as used by archers in the Olympics and many other competitive events.

== Reflex bows ==
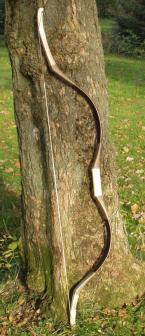
An asymmetric reflex recurve bow, a fibreglass reconstruction of bows used by steppe nomads.

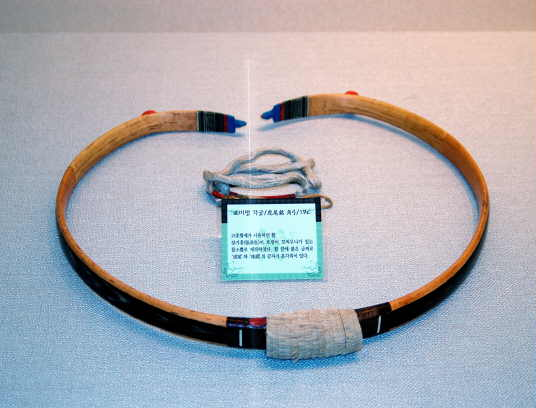
Gakgung, Korean traditional reflex recurve bow, as used by soldiers and officers. This bow is described as C-shaped because of the extreme reflex when unstrung.

A reflex bow is a bow that has curved or curled arms which turn away from the archer throughout their length. When unstrung, the entire length of the bow curves forward from the belly (away from the archer), resembling a "C"; this differentiates a reflex bow from a recurve bow in which only the outer parts of the limbs turn away from the archer. The curves put the materials of the bow under greater stress, allowing a rather short bow to have a high draw weight and a long draw length. This allows a bow that is significantly shorter than a recurve or a longbow to shoot with the same or greater velocity and power. They became the classic weapon of the horse archers who have repeatedly conquered much of Asia and Europe; their short profile compared with longer bows made them ideal for horseback use. However, the materials and workmanship must be of high quality.

Bows of traditional materials with significant reflex are almost all composite bows, made of the classic three layers of horn, wood, and sinew; they are normally made in the recurve shape. Highly reflexed composite bows are still used in Korea and were common in Turkish and Indian traditional archery. Highly reflexed bows can in some cases require special bracing and stringing methods or tools such as a bracing board.

== Decurve bows ==
A decurve bow is a bow that has arms curved or curled at the ends to turn towards the archer. This bow form reduces the strain on the bow when it is used, and the bow may be under no tension at all when strung, so that it can be kept ready for immediate use at all times. It also reduces the energy stored in the bow, and the speed of the arrow. The form is seldom used in modern or historical bows, but was occasionally used by groups such as the Mohave who did not have easy access to good quality bow wood. It allowed them to make effective hunting weapons from the poor-quality material available. A decurve bow is seen in a rock painting from the Tassili plateau in the Sahara.

== Deflex bows ==
A deflex bow is a bow that has arms curved or curled at the base, to turn towards the archer when unstrung. This bow form reduces the strain on the limbs and also the energy stored by the weapon. Most modern recurve bows are built with some degree of deflex. It has been used occasionally in traditional bows, for example to make a bow that looks like a traditional hornbow without using any actual horn.

== Compound bows ==
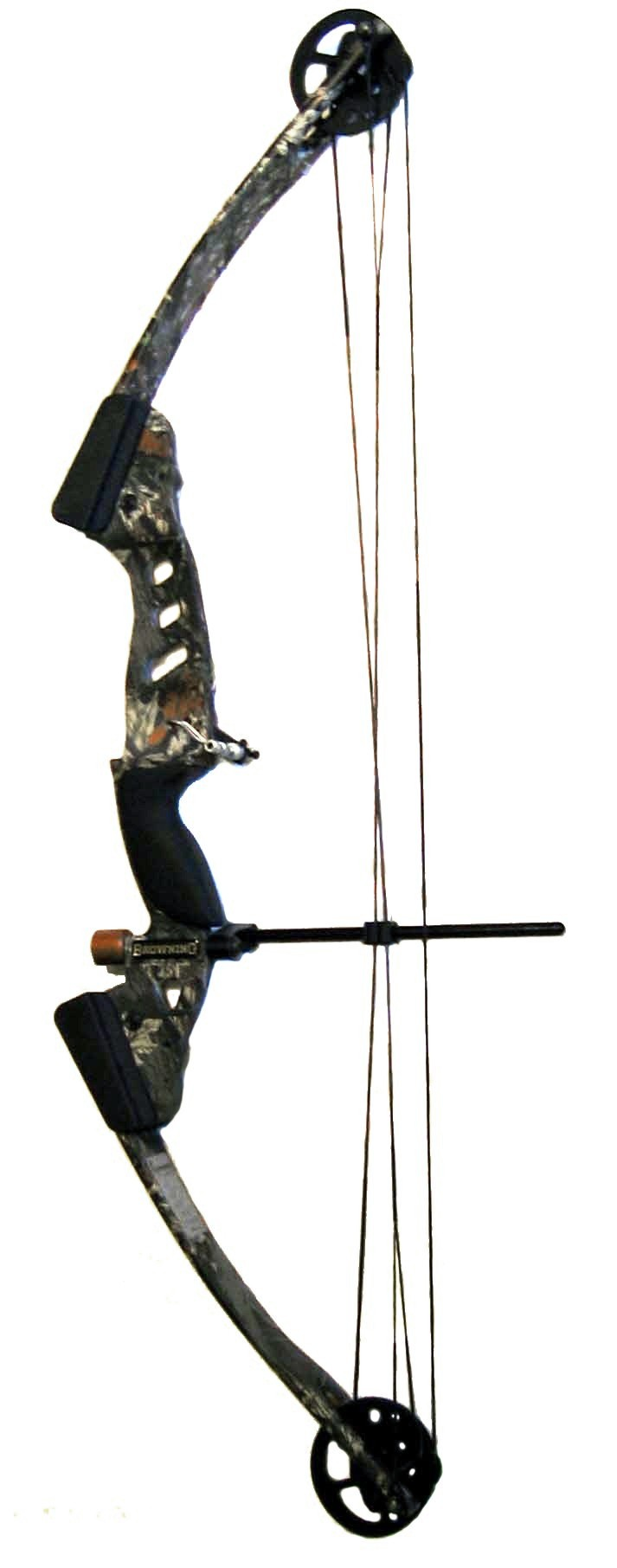
A modern compound bow

The compound bow, not to be confused with a composite bow, is a modern bow that uses a levering system, usually of cables and pulleys, to bend the limbs. The limbs of a compound bow are much stiffer than those of a recurve bow or longbow. This limb stiffness makes the compound bow more energy-efficient than other bows, in conjunction with the pulley/cams. The typical compound bow has its string applied to pulleys (cams), and one or both of the pulleys have one or more cables attached to the opposite limb. When the string is drawn back, the string causes the pulleys to turn. When the draw commences, the archer has reduced mechanical advantage, but during the draw, as the pulley cams rotate, and the archer gains mechanical advantage over the bending limbs, more energy is stored, in comparison with other bows.

== Shaping and tapering ==
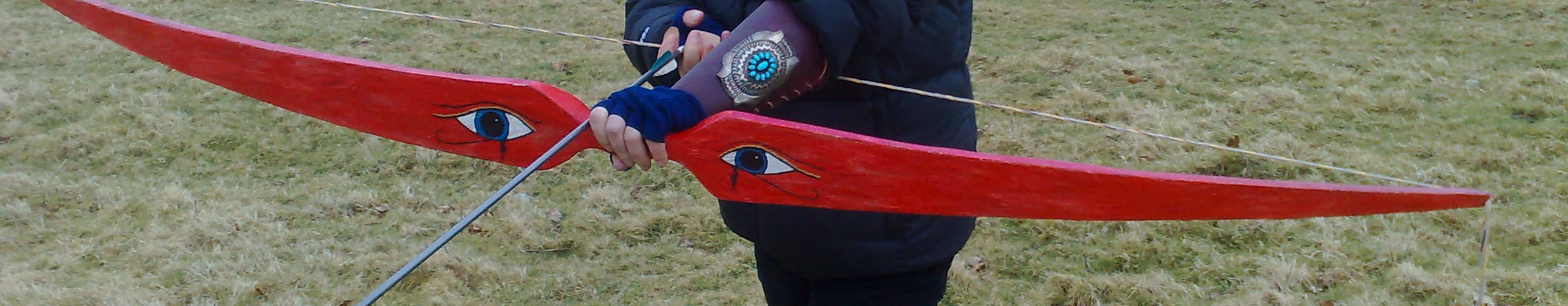
A "pyramid" bow from the front

Bows usually taper from the handle to the tips. Tapering reduces mass in the outer limb and dissipates the limb stresses; this increases the speed at which the tips move which propels arrows faster. Shapes may be optimized for various purposes, especially maximum speed of the arrow; the details are the subject of active research.

Narrow bows normally taper uniformly. However, the taper of flatbows varies. The working limbs of "paddle" bows maintain width for almost the entire limb length, "pyramid" bows taper uniformly from the handle to a narrow tip, and "Holmegaard-style" bows remain full width to about two-thirds of the way along the limb, then narrow sharply. "Eiffel Tower" bows taper sharply, but smoothly, to a very narrow outer tip.

The optimal cross-section of the bending section of a bow limb is rectangular, and almost all modern bows have such limbs. However, many, perhaps most, traditional bows have had a cross-section closer to circular, with every possible variation being used at some point. Current definitions of the traditional longbow require approximations of a D-shaped cross section.

== See also ==
- Crossbow
- English longbow
- Cable-backed bow
- Compound bow
- Laminated bow
- Composite bow
- Mongol bow
- Turkish bow
- Flatbow
- Self bow
- Recurve bow
- Bow draw
