= AFB =

AFB may refer to:

- Armed Forces Bank, a US-based financial institution for military members and families
- Armed Forces Bikers, a UK-based motorcycle charity to assist former members of the armed forces
- Acid-fast bacilli
- Air Force Base
- Air Force Brat (children of Air Force personnel)
- American Farm Bureau
- American flatbow, a style of bow used in archery
- American foulbrood, a honeybee disease
- American Foundation for the Blind
- Spoken Gulf Arabic (SIL code)
- A_{FB}, the forward-backward asymmetry
