= Compound bow =

Type of bow for archery

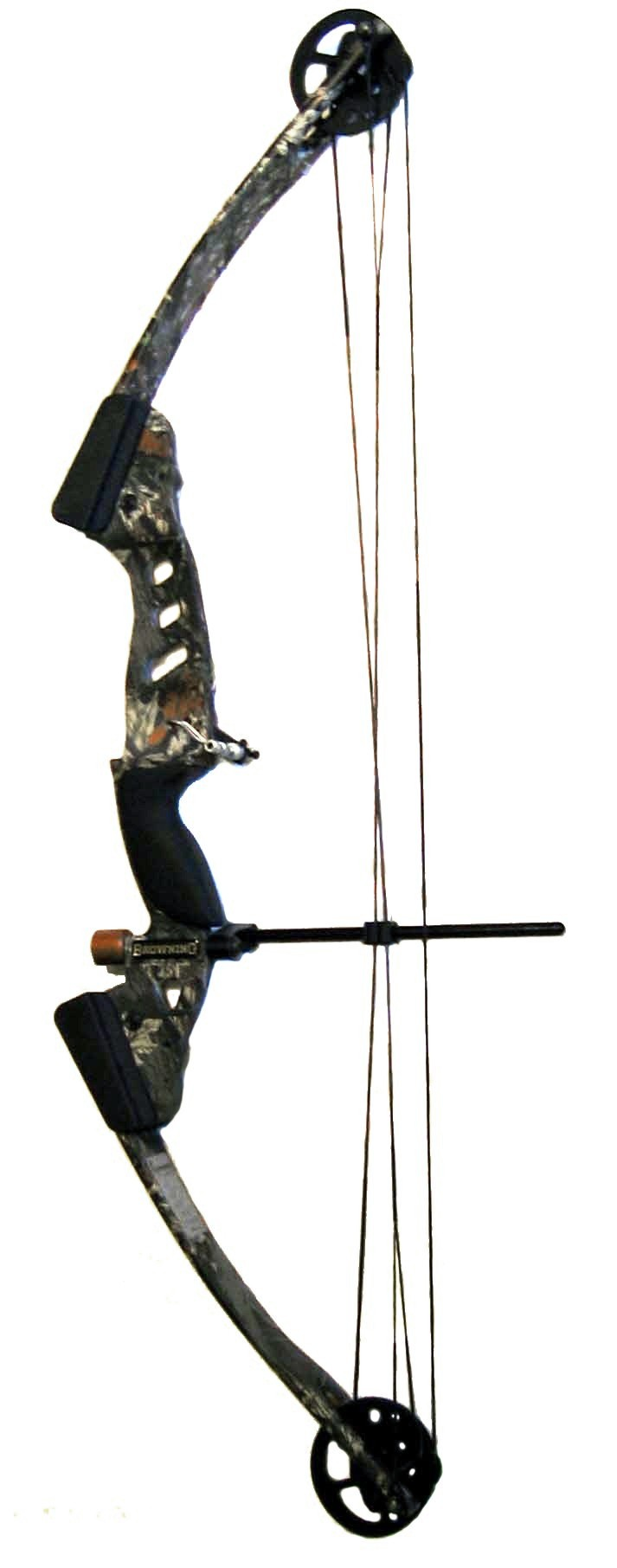
- Type: Bow and Arrow

In modern archery, a compound bow is a bow that uses a levering system, usually of cables and pulleys, to bend the limbs. The compound bow was first developed in 1966 by Holless Wilbur Allen in North Kansas City, Missouri, and a US patent was granted in 1969. Compound bows are widely used in target practice and bowhunting.

Compound bows are typically constructed of man-made materials such as aluminium and carbon fiber.

The pulley/cam system grants the user a mechanical advantage, and so the limbs of a compound bow are much stiffer than those of a recurve bow or longbow. This rigidity makes the compound bow more energy-efficient than traditional bows, as less energy is dissipated in limb movement. The higher-rigidity and more advanced construction also improves accuracy by reducing the bow's sensitivity to changes in temperature and humidity.

== History ==
In literature of the early 20th century, before the invention of compound bows, composite bows were described as "compound".

The compound bow was first developed in 1966 by Holless Wilbur Allen in North Kansas City, Missouri, and a US patent was granted in 1969.

== Construction ==
A bow's central mount for other components (limbs, sights, stabilizers and quivers) is called the riser. Risers are designed to be as rigid as possible. The central riser of a compound bow is usually made of aluminum, magnesium alloy, or carbon fiber and many are made of 7075 aluminum alloy.

Limbs are made of fiberglass-based composite materials, or occasionally wood, and able to withstand high tensile and compressive forces. The limbs store the kinetic energy of the bow – no energy is stored in the pulleys and cables. Draw weights of adult compound bows range is between 40 and 80 pounds (18 and 36 kg), which can create arrow speeds of 250 to 370 feet per second (76 to 113 m/s).

In the most common configuration, there is a cam or wheel at the end of each limb. The shape of the cam may vary somewhat between different bow designs. There are several different concepts of using the cams to store energy in the limbs, and these all fall under a category called bow eccentrics. The four most common types of bow eccentrics are Single Cam, Hybrid Cam, Dual Cam and Binary Cam. However, there are also other less common designs, like the Quad Cam and Hinged. Cams are often described using their "let-off" rating. As a cam is rotated, the force required to hold the bow in position reaches a peak and then decreases as the bow approaches maximum extension (a position known as "the wall"). The percent-difference between the maximum force encountered during the draw and the force required to hold the bow in full extension is the "let-off". This value is commonly between 65% and 80% of the peak weight for recently designed compound bows, although some older compound bows provided a let-off of only 50% and some recent designs achieve let-offs in excess of 90%.

As the string is drawn the cam turns and imparts force to compress the limb. Initially, the archer has the 'short' side of the cam, with the leverage being a mechanical disadvantage. High energy input is therefore required. When near full draw is reached, the cam has turned to its full extent, the archer has gained mechanical advantage, and the least amount of force needs to be applied to the string to keep the limbs bent. This is known as "let off". The lower holding weight enables the archer to maintain the bow fully drawn and take more time to aim. This let-off enables the archer to accurately shoot a compound bow with a much higher peak draw weight than other bows (see below).

However, there are some youth-oriented compound bows with low draw weights that have no let-off and have a maximum draw length deliberately set farther than the majority of young shooters would reach. This effectively makes the bow function very similar to a recurve, with the draw length determined by the shooter's preferred anchor point. This removes the necessity to adjust the bow draw length or use a different bow for different shooters (or to change bows as the shooter gets older). An example of this type of bow is the Genesis, which is standard equipment in the U.S. National Archery in the Schools Program.

Compound bow strings and cables are normally made of high-modulus polyethylene and are designed to have great tensile strength and minimal stretchability, so that the bow transfers its energy to the arrow as efficiently and durably as possible. In earlier models of compound bows, the cables were often made of plastic-coated steel.

== Design ==
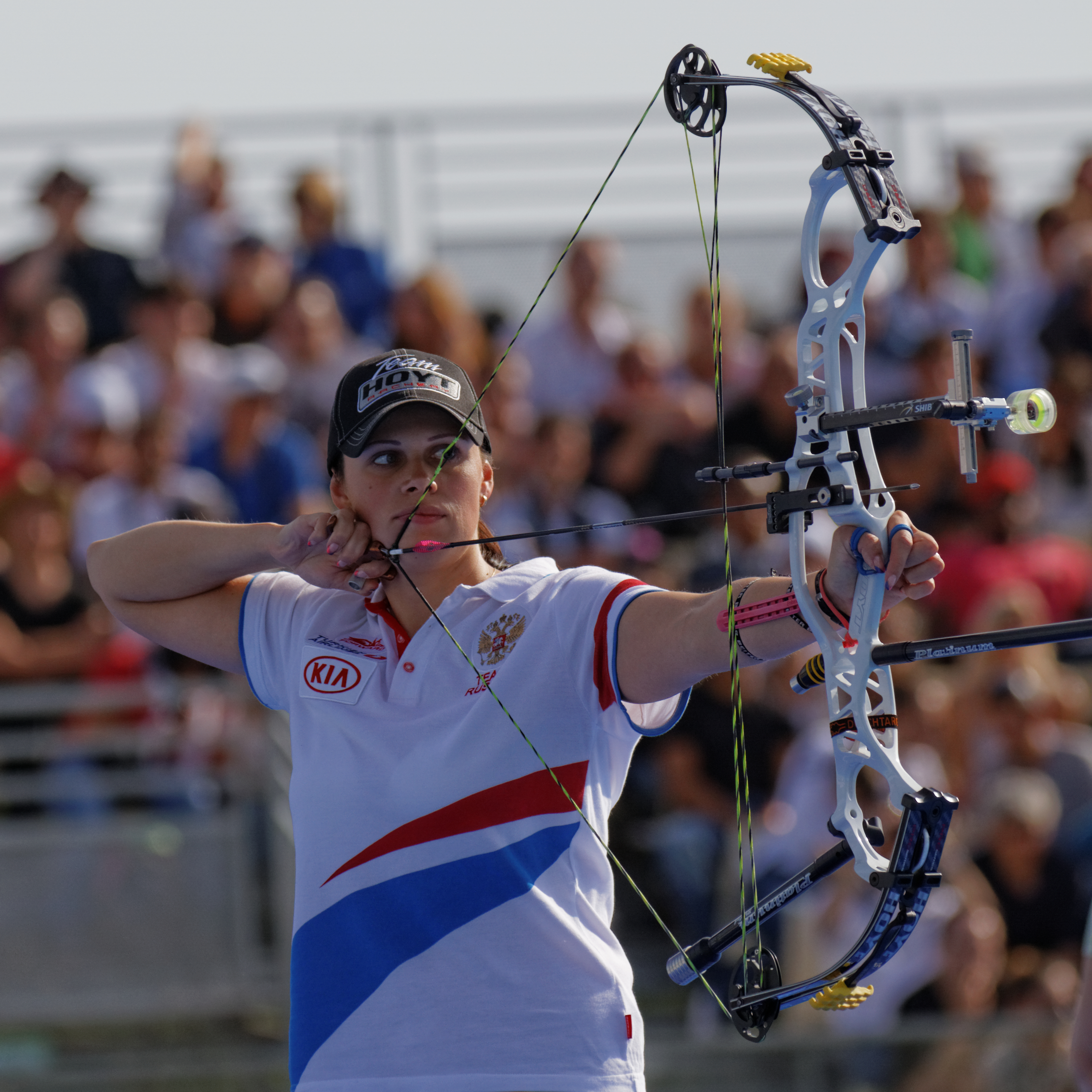
Albina Loginova at women's individual compound 3rd place, 2013 FITA Archery World Cup, Paris, France

The function of the cam systems (known as the 'eccentrics') is to maximize the energy storage throughout the draw cycle and provide let-off at the end of the cycle (less holding weight at full draw). A traditional recurve bow has a very linear draw weight curve - meaning that as the bow is drawn back, the draw force becomes heavier with each inch of draw (and most difficult at full draw). Therefore, little energy is stored in the first half of the draw, and much more energy at the end where the draw weight is heaviest. The compound bow operates with a different weight profile, reaching its peak weight within the first few inches of the draw, and remaining more flat and constant until the end of the cycle where the cams "let-off" and allow a reduced holding weight. This manipulation of the peak weight throughout the draw (accomplished by the elliptical shape of the cams that change leverage and mechanical advantage) is why compound bows store more energy and shoot faster than an equivalent peak weight recurve bow or longbow. The design of the cams directly controls the acceleration of the arrow. What is termed a "soft cam" will accelerate the arrow more gently than a "harder" cam. Novice archers will typically shoot a soft cam whereas a more advanced archer may choose to use a harder cam to gain speed. Bows can be had with a variety of cams, in a full spectrum from soft to hard. Some pulley systems use a single cam at the bottom of the bow and a round idler wheel at the top of the bow instead of two identical cams. This design eliminates the need for a separate control cable and instead uses a single long string that begins at the cam on the bottom of the bow, travels over the wheel on top, and back to the bottom cam. A separate buss cable then connects the bottom cam to the top limb.

When a compound bow is drawn, the limbs are pulled in toward each other by the cables, unlike a longbow or recurve where the limbs flex in the direction of the bow string. This difference allows modern compounds to have limbs that are closer to horizontal instead of angled. The horizontal, or "parallel" limb configuration minimizes the recoil and vibration felt by the shooter when the arrow is released, as the forces going upward at the top limb and downward at the bottom limb cancel each other out.

The pulley system will usually include some rubber-covered blocks that act as draw-stops. These provide a solid "wall" that the archer can draw against. These draw stops can be adjusted to suit the archer's optimum draw-length, which helps the archer achieve a consistent anchor point and a consistent amount of force imparted to the arrow on every shot, further increasing accuracy.

Compound archers often use a mechanical release aid to hold and release the string. This attaches to the bowstring near the point where the arrow attaches, the nocking point, and permits the archer to release the string with a squeeze of a trigger or a slight increase of tension. The use of a release aid gives a more consistent release than the use of fingers on the string as it minimises the arrow oscillation which is inevitable when the bowstring is released directly from the fingers. Drawing a compound bow with just the fingers increases the likelihood of torquing the bowstring, which could derail it from the cams. The use of a mechanical release-aid is often required to avoid this.

The relatively larger number of moving parts requires additional maintenance and creates more potential points of failure, and dry firing is more likely to damage or destroy a compound bow due to the greater amount of energy stored and released.

Unlike traditional bows, draw length and let-off adjustments as well as string or cable replacements often require a bow press, a specialized tool used for compressing the limbs to take tension off the cables and string.

Compound bows are usually heavier than recurves and longbows. The relatively low holding weight of a compound bow compared to a recurve bow makes the compound more sensitive to certain shooting form faults when the archer is at full draw. In particular, it's easier for the archer to torque (twist) the bow around the vertical axis, leading to left-right errors, and also a plucked or snatched release can have more effect.

== Arrows ==
Arrows used with compound bows do not differ significantly from those used with recurve bows, being typically either aluminum alloy, carbon fiber, or a composite of the two materials. Wooden arrows are not commonly used on compound bows because of their fragility. Most arrows in use today are of the carbon fiber variety. An important distinction arrow-wise between recurve bows and compound bows is that of arrow spine. Compound bows and target recurve bows with fully center-shot cutaway risers tend to be very forgiving in regard to spine selection. Modern compound bows are typically equipped with substantially stiffer arrows than an equivalent draw-length and draw-weight recurve bow would be. Another advantage of the center-shot riser is that the arrow need not bend around the riser (nearly as much or at all) during the shot. Fine-tuning may be accomplished by adjustment of the arrow rest, or nock point on the string, rather than by changing arrow-length and tip weight.

Manufacturers produce arrow shafts with different weights, different spines (stiffness), and different lengths in the same model of shaft to accommodate different draw weights and lengths, matched to archers' different styles, preferences and physical attributes.

Arrow stiffness (spine) is an important parameter in finding arrows that will shoot accurately from any particular bow (see Archer's paradox), the spine varying with both the construction and length of the arrow.

Another important consideration is that the IBO (International Bowhunting Organization) recommends at least 5 grains per pound (0.71 grams per kilogram) of draw weight as a safety buffer. This means a bow that draws 60 pounds (27 kg) would need at least a 300-grain (19-gram) finished-with-tip arrow. Shooting arrows lighter than this guideline risks damage to the bow similar to that caused by dry-firing, which can in turn cause injury to the archer or anyone standing nearby. Shooting arrows that are too light also voids most manufacturer warranties.

== Specifications ==
AMO (Archery Manufacturers and merchants Organization, the former name of the body now known as the Archery Trade Association) standard draw length is the distance from the string at full draw to the lowest point on the grip plus 1.75 inches (4.4 cm). Because the draw force may increase more or less rapidly, and again drop off more or less rapidly when approaching peak draw, bows of the same peak draw force can store different amounts of energy. Norbert Mullaney has defined the ratio of stored energy to peak draw force (S.E./P.D.F.). This is usually around one foot-pound per pound-force (3 joules per kilogram-force) but can reach 1.4 ft⋅lb/lbf (4.2 J/kgf).

The efficiency of bows also varies. Normally between 70 and 85% of the stored energy is transferred to the arrow. This stored energy is referred to as potential energy. When transferred to the arrow it is referred to as kinetic energy. The product of S.E./P.D.F. and efficiency can be called the power factor. There are two measurement standards of this quantity – ATA and IBO speed. ATA is defined as the initial velocity of a 350-grain (23-gram) arrow when shot from a bow with a peak draw weight of 70 ± 0.2 lbf (311.38 ± 0.89 N) and draw length of 30 ± 0.25 in (76.20 ± 0.64 cm). IBO speed is defined as the initial velocity of an arrow with a weight of 5 grains (0.32 g) per pound of draw weight. While many manufacturers measure IBO speeds using a draw weight of 70 lbf (310 N) and draw length of 30 in (76 cm), the IBO standard allows a draw weight of as high as 80 ± 2 lbf (355.9 ± 8.9 N), and does not specify a draw length. The average IBO speed for the majority of compound bows on the market hovers around 310–320 feet per second.

Brace height is the distance from the pivot point of the grip to the string at rest. Typically a shorter brace height will result in an increased power stroke, but comes at the price of a bow that's less forgiving to shooter error and having harsher string slap.

== Uses ==
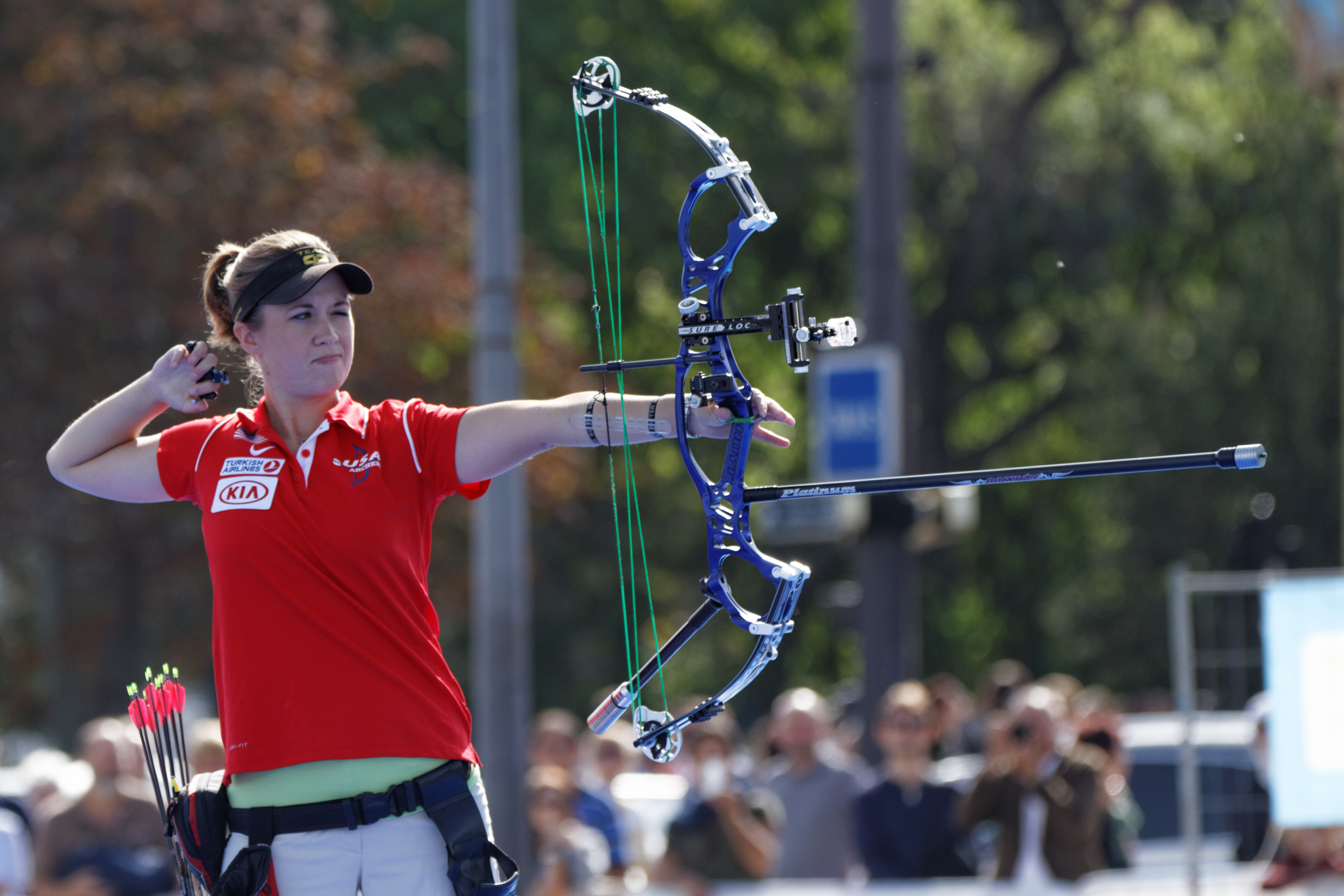
Archer Erika Jones shooting a compound bow at the 2013 Archery World Cup. The bow has the axle attaching the limb to cam mounted at the edge of the cam as opposed to the center

Compound bows are widely used in target practice or 3D Archery and hunting.

In tournaments, competition rules for compound archers allow bows with a sighting system, consisting of a "peep sight" held within the bowstring that acts as a back sight, however front sights attached to the riser are allowable in other classes. Some front sights are magnifying and/or adjustable for targets at different distances. Some sights have multiple "pins" set up for targets at different distances.

In archery tournaments governed by World Archery, compound archers are permitted to use bow sights that incorporate magnifying lenses or prisms. These "magnified sights" enhance the archer's ability to aim by enlarging the target face, providing a clearer view of the scoring zones. Additionally, such sights may include features like windage and elevation adjustments and leveling devices to aid in precise aiming. However, all components must be non-electric and non-electronic to comply with equipment regulations.

== See also ==
- 3D Archery – Competitive archery under field hunting conditions
- Binary cam – Design for the pulley system of a compound bow
- Cable-backed bow – Type of ranged weapon
- Composite bow – Bow made from horn, wood, and sinew laminated together
- Crossbow – Bow-like ranged weapon
- English longbow – Type of ranged weapon
- Flatbow – Type of bow shape in archery
- Horse archer – Using a bow and arrow while riding from horseback
- Laminated bow – Type of archery bow
- Self bow – Type of archery bow
- Yumi – Japanese asymmetrical bow
