= Self bow =

Type of archery bow

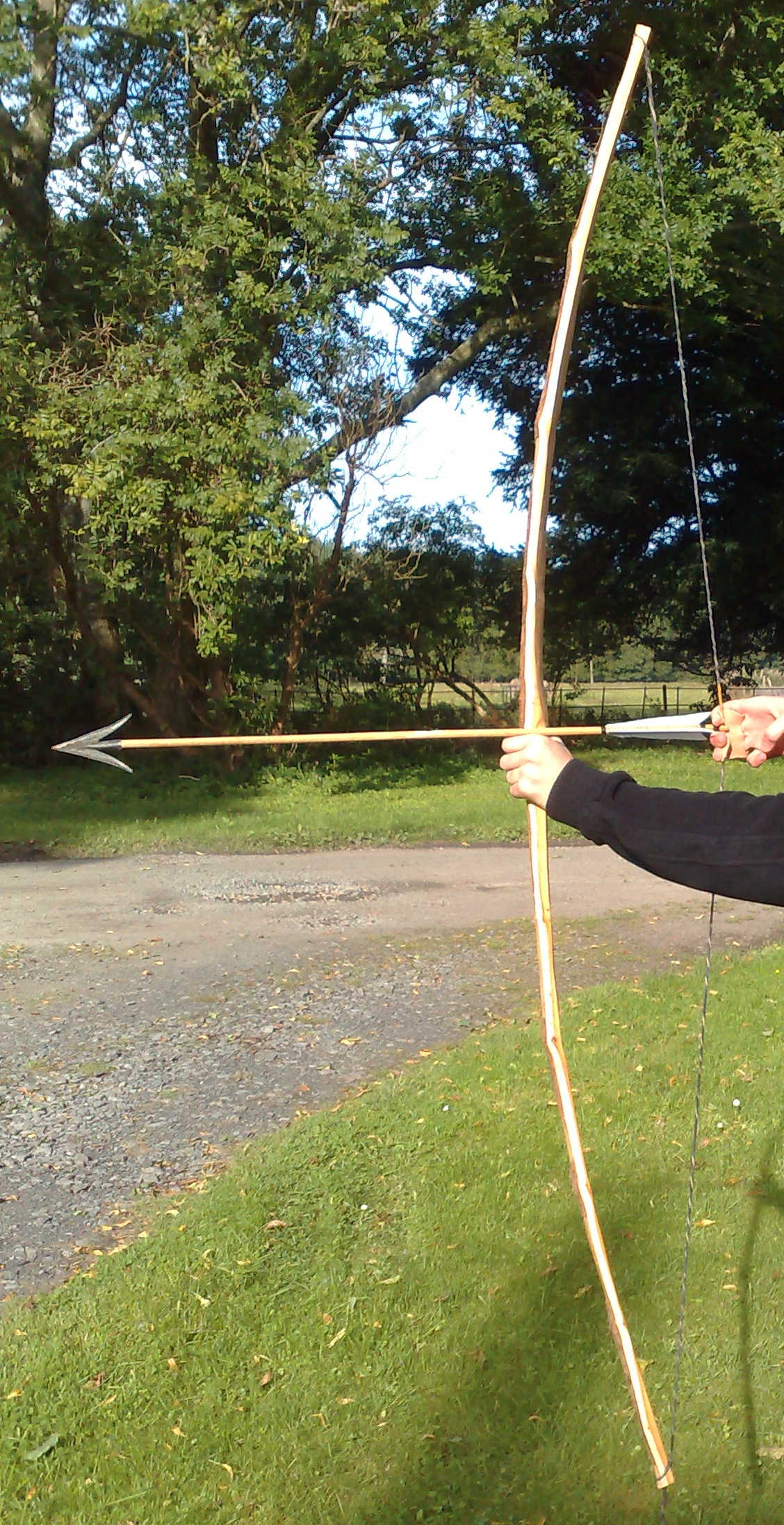
A bow made from straight, but knotty and poor-quality yew

A self bow or simple bow is a bow made from a single piece of wood. Extra material such as horn nocks on the ends, or built-up handles, would normally be accepted as part of a self bow. Some modern authorities would also accept a bow spliced together in the handle from two pieces of wood.

== Comparison with composite bows ==
An effective self bow can be made from widely available local material in most inhabited parts of the world, with limited tools whose functions include chopping, shaving, and scraping. A day of work may be needed starting with a seasoned stave or felled tree. By contrast, a composite bow requires at least a week of work and could require work for up to several years, starting with a much greater range of materials and skills. Self bows must be approximately the height of the archer if they are to allow a long draw, and they are less efficient in the specialized art of flight archery. Well-designed composite bows of high draw-weight give higher arrow velocity, and the bow itself is shorter. However, the hide glue that holds a composite bow together absorbs water and will dissolve if soaked; the wood of self bows is less sensitive to humidity.

The greater density of horn and sinew compared to wood usually cancels any advantage of composite construction for modern amateurs due to the greater weight. For most practical non-mounted archery purposes, self bows can perform as well as composite; "the initial velocity is about the same for all types of bow… within certain limits"

== History ==
In many parts of the world, including much of Africa, the Americas, northern Europe, and Southern Asia, the great majority of traditional bows are self bows. The first bow artifacts, the Stellmoor and Holmegaard artifacts of Northern Europe, are self bows. The Stellmoor bow was made from the heartwood of a Scots pine while the oldest Holmegaard bows were carved from small-diameter elms. In primitive flight archery competitions, bows inspired by the design of the Holmegaard bows perform very well because of their light, non-bending tips.

Self bows are still used today by traditional archers, primitive skills enthusiasts, and hunters who appreciate their historic simplicity. They can successfully and ethically kill game animals for meat if they have enough draw weight and are paired with a broadhead at close range. Learning to fell a tree and craft a bow can still be a useful educational skill for young people living long-term on a homestead or in a wilderness setting.

== Selecting wood ==
In most inhabited areas, common timbers from tree trunks can be made into high-quality self bows. Felling the tree with an axe or handsaw is useful for obtaining the most optimum quality of wood to facilitate bow mechanics, as this is not found in branches or ground logs. A long lasting bow can be made within a few weeks to two years, depending on how the wood is dried and shaped. The pieces must be long enough (approximately the height of the archer), and the grain must be sufficiently straight. Denser timbers normally store energy better and can be made into narrower bows with less effort – high-quality yew allows for particularly narrow self bows, such as the traditional European version of the longbow. The Eastern Woodlands tribes of North America used hickory, tribes in parts of the Midwestern United States osage orange, Native Americans of the west coast used short, wide, recurved bows made of American Pacific yew, Brazilian rainforest tribes used palm wood, and many others. In Europe and North America, common woods such as maple, ash, elm, and oak make excellent flat bows, and are far easier to obtain than good-quality yew.

The fibres on the back of a self bow must be, so far as possible, continuous. This may be achieved by using the outer, under-bark surface of the tree as the back of the bow (convenient with most white woods), or by the painstaking process of removing outer growth rings (often used with yew and osage orange), or by making or following a cut or split surface which happens to have continuous grain (a usual approach if starting with commercially sawn wood).

The density of timber correlates well with its ability to store energy as it is bent. Denser timbers can make narrower bows. The same design for less dense timbers results in the bow taking excessive set-string follow, or even breaking. However, equally effective bows may be made from less dense timber by making them wider near the centre. The mass of equivalent bows is closely similar whatever the density of wood; approximately the same mass of wood is required whatever the density of the timber.

The overall length of bending wood must be about 2.3 times the draw length. Narrow bows (known as "longbows") can bend in the handle. Wider bows (known as "flatbows") must be narrow in the handle if they are to be practical, but the handle must be made thicker so as not to bend, and the complete bow will therefore tend to be longer.

Self bows may be of any side-view profile; moderate recurving can often be achieved with heat and force.

== See also ==
- Longbow
- Crossbow
- Cable-backed bow
- Compound bow
- Laminated bow
- Recurve bow
