= OR1 =

OR1 or OR-1 may refer to:

- OR-1: a collection of hominid teeth and cranium fragments discovered at the Obi-Rakhmat Grotto in Uzbekistan
- NATO rank OR-1
- Oregon's 1st congressional district
- Pacific Highway No. 1 (Oregon), a part of the Pacific Highway (U.S.)
