= Longbow =

Type of ranged weapon that uses arrows

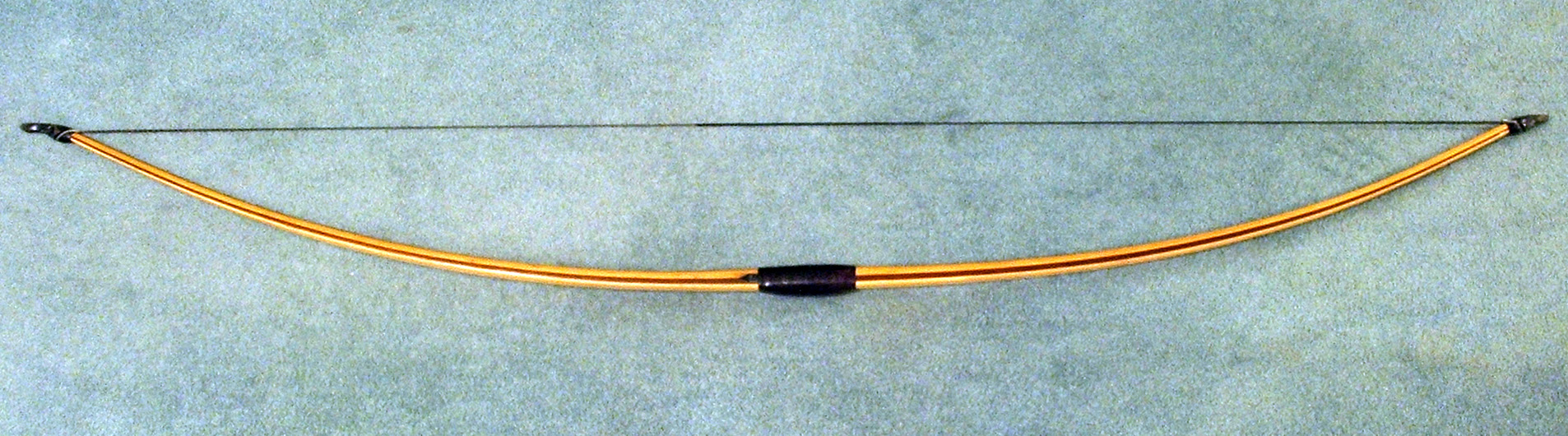
Picture of a longbow made with wood, 2013

A longbow is a type of tall bow that makes a long draw possible. Longbows for hunting and warfare have been made from many different woods in many cultures; in Europe they date from the Paleolithic era and, since the Bronze Age, were made mainly from yew, or from wych elm if yew was unavailable. The historical longbow was a self bow made of a single piece of wood, but modern longbows may also be made from modern materials or by gluing different timbers together.

== History ==
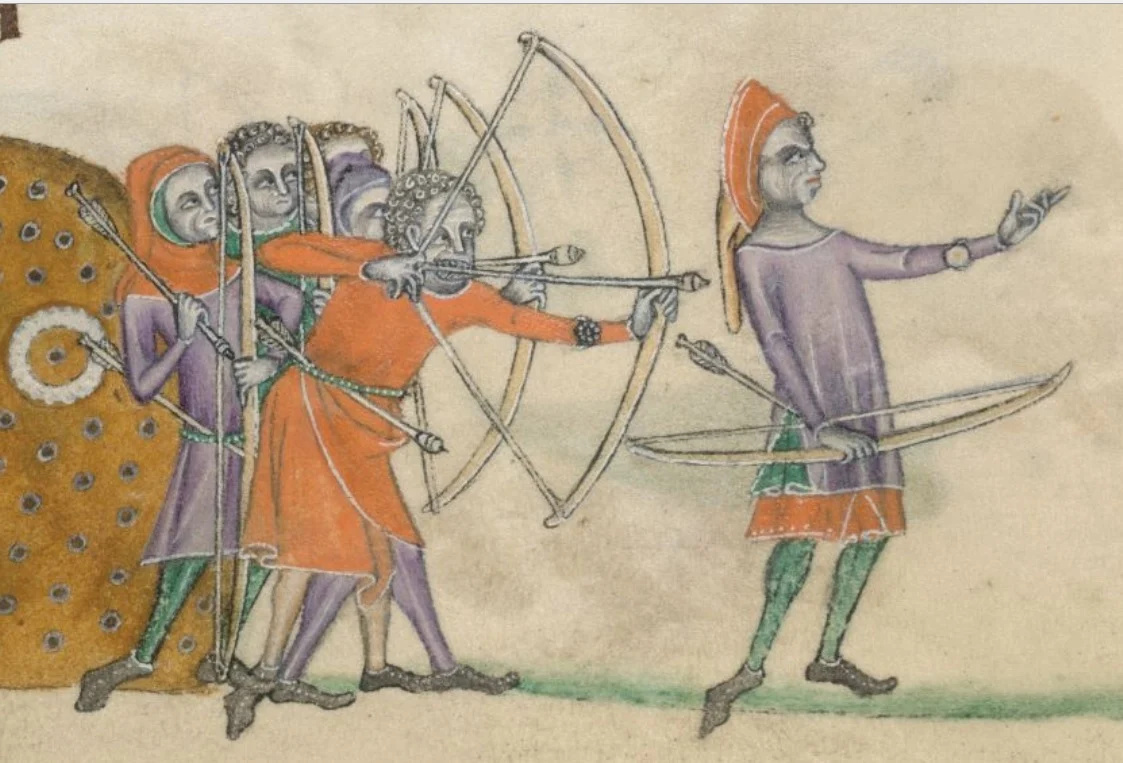
Illustration of longbowmen from the 14th century

=== Europe ===
==== Prehistory ====
A longbow was found in 1991 in the Ötztal Alps with a natural mummy known as Ötzi. His bow was made from yew and was 1.82 metres (72 in) long; the body has been dated to around 3300 BC. A slightly shorter bow comes from the Scottish parish of Tweedsmuir in a peat bog known as Rotten Bottom. The bow, made from yew, has been given a calibrated radiocarbon date of 4040 BC to 3640 BC. Another bow made from yew, found within some peat in Somerset, England has been dated to 2700–2600 BC. Forty longbows, which date from the 4th century AD, have been discovered in a peat bog at Nydam in Denmark.

==== Middle Ages ====
In the Middle Ages the English and Welsh were famous for their very powerful longbows, used en masse to great effect against the French in the Hundred Years' War, with notable success at the battles of Crécy (1346), Poitiers (1356) and Agincourt (1415). During the reign of Edward III of England, laws were passed allowing fletchers and bowyers to be impressed into the army and enjoining them to practise archery. The dominance of the longbow on the battlefield continued until the French began to use cannon to break the formations of English archers at the Battle of Formigny (1450) and the Battle of Castillon (1453). Their use continued in the Wars of the Roses. They survived as a weapon of war in England well beyond the introduction of effective firearms. The Battle of Flodden (1513) was "a landmark in the history of archery, as the last battle on English soil to be fought with the longbow as the principal weapon..."

==== Sixteenth and seventeenth centuries ====
In 1588, the militia called out in anticipation of invasion by the Spanish Armada included many archers in its ranks. The Kent militia, for instance, had 1,662 archers out of 12,654 men mustered.

The Battle of Tippermuir (1644), in Scotland, may have been the last battle in the British Isles to involve the longbow in significant numbers.

==== Early literature ====
The earliest known book on European longbow archery is the anonymous L'Art D'Archerie, produced in France in the late 15th or early 16th century. The first book in English about longbow archery was Toxophilus by Roger Ascham, first published in London in 1545 and dedicated to King Henry VIII.

=== Modern recreational and hunting use ===
Although firearms supplanted bows in warfare, wooden or fibreglass laminated longbows continue to be used by traditional archers and some tribal societies for recreation and hunting. A longbow has practical advantages compared with a modern recurve or compound bow; it is usually lighter, quicker to prepare for shooting and shoots more quietly. With the longbow it is possible to use instinctive shooting, a fast shooting method widely used in hunting or in 3D Archery competitions. However, other things being equal, the modern bow will shoot a faster arrow more accurately than the longbow.

Organisations that run archery competitions have set out formal definitions for various classes of bow; many definitions of the longbow would exclude some medieval examples, materials and techniques of use. Some archery clubs in the United States classify longbows simply as bows with strings that do not come in contact with their limbs. According to the British Longbow Society, the English longbow is made so that its thickness is at least 5/8 (62.5%) of its width, as in Victorian longbows, and is widest at the grip. A similar, more inclusive, definition was created by the International Longbow Archers Association (ILAA) which defined the bow as fitting within a rectangular template of the proportions 1:0.625.

== Design and construction ==
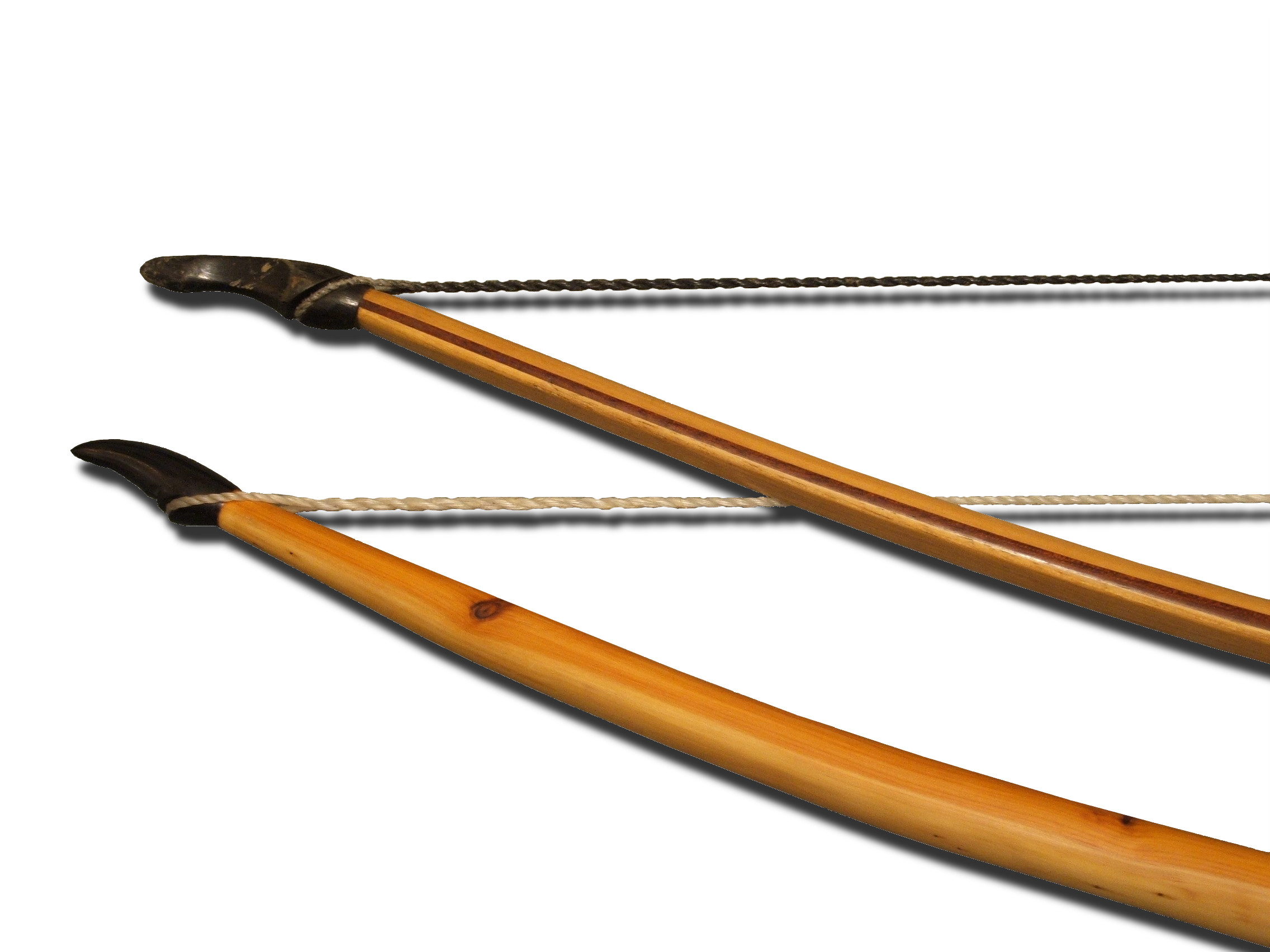
Top: Lemonwood, purpleheart and hickory laminated bow. Bottom: Yew selfbow.

Because the longbow can be made from a single piece of wood, it can be crafted relatively easily and quickly. Amateur bowyers today can make a longbow in about ten to twenty hours.

One of the simpler longbow designs is known as the self bow, by definition made from a single piece of wood. Traditional English longbows are self bows made from yew wood. The bowstave is cut from the radius of the felled tree so that sapwood (on the outside of the tree) becomes the back and forms about one third of the total thickness; the remaining two-thirds or so is heartwood (50/50 is about the maximum sapwood/heartwood ratio generally used). Yew sapwood is good only in tension, while the heartwood is good in compression. However, compromises must be made when making a yew longbow, as it is difficult to find perfect unblemished yew. The demand for yew bowstaves was such that by the late 16th century mature yew trees were almost extinct in northern Europe. In other desirable woods such as Osage orange and mulberry the sapwood is almost useless and is normally removed entirely.

Longbows, because of their narrow limbs and rounded cross-section (which does not spread out stress within the wood as evenly as a flatbow's rectangular cross section), need to be less powerful, longer or of more elastic wood than an equivalent flatbow. In Europe the last approach was used, with yew being the wood of choice, because of its high compressive strength, light weight, and elasticity. Yew is the best widespread European timber that will make good self longbows, (other woods such as elm can make longbows but require heat-treating of the belly and a wider belly/narrower back, while still falling into the definition of a longbow) and has been the main wood used in European bows since Neolithic times. More common and cheaper hard woods, including elm, oak, hickory, ash, hazel and maple, are good for flatbows. A narrow longbow with high draw-weight can be made from these woods, but it is likely to take a permanent bend (known as "set" or "following the string") and would probably be outshot by an equivalent made of yew.

Wooden laminated longbows can be made by gluing together two or more different pieces of wood. Usually this is done to take advantage of the inherent properties of different woods: some woods can better withstand compression while others are better at withstanding tension. Examples include hickory and lemonwood, or bamboo and yew longbows: hickory or bamboo is used on the back of the bow (the part facing away from the archer when shooting) and so is in tension, while the belly (the part facing the archer when shooting) is made of lemonwood or yew and undergoes compression (see bending for a further explanation of stresses in a bending beam). Traditionally made Japanese yumi are also laminated longbows, made from strips of wood: the core of the bow is bamboo, the back and belly are bamboo or hardwood, and hardwood strips are laminated to the bow's sides to prevent twisting. Any wooden bow must have gentle treatment and be protected from excessive damp or dryness. Wooden bows may shoot as well as fiberglass, but they are more easily dented or broken by abuse. Bows made of modern materials can be left strung for longer than wood bows, which may take a large amount of set if not unstrung immediately after use.

== Legacy ==
The longbow and its historical significance, arising from its adoption by the Welsh fighting alongside the English during the Hundred Years' War, have created a lasting legacy for the longbow, which has given its name to modern military equipment, including:

- The Dakota Longbow T-76, a sniper rifle
- The AN/APG-78 Longbow, a millimeter-wave fire-control radar (FCR) system for the Apache attack helicopter (often called "Apache Longbow" when equipped with this system)
- The AGM-114L Longbow Hellfire, an air-to-ground missile with millimeter-wave guidance

== See also ==
- Bow shape
- Cable-backed bow
- Composite bow
- Crossbow
- Horse archer
- Welsh bow
