= Recurve bow =

Type of bow shape in archery

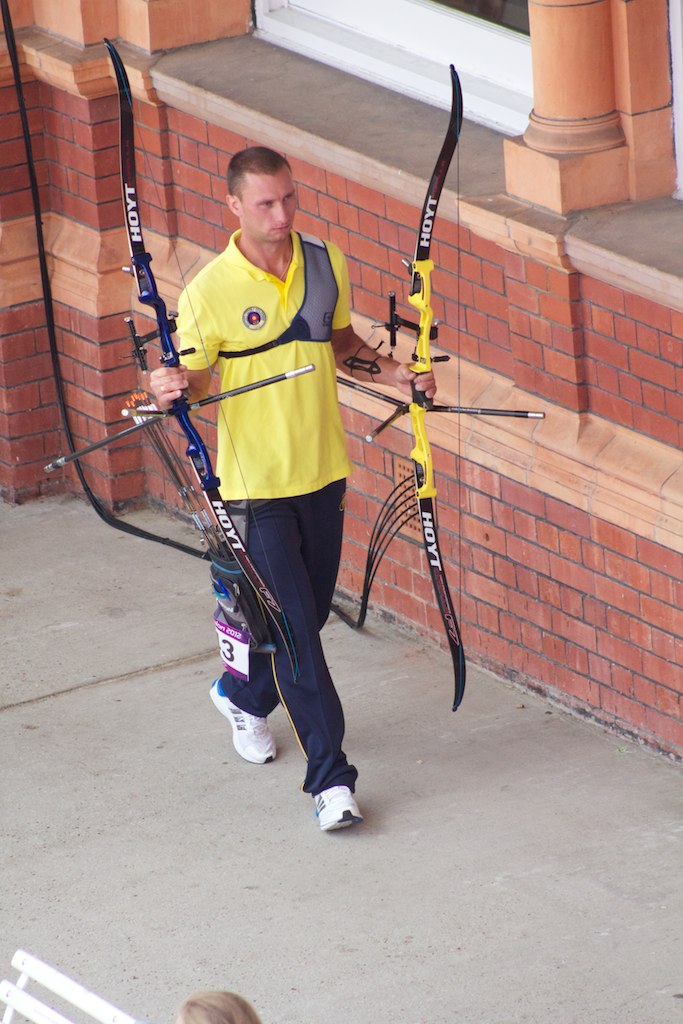
2008 Olympic gold medallist Viktor Ruban carries two recurve bows at the 2012 Olympic Games

In archery, a recurve bow is one of the main shapes a bow can take, with limbs that curve away from the archer when unstrung. A recurve bow stores more energy and delivers energy more efficiently than the equivalent straight-limbed bow, giving a greater amount of energy and speed to the arrow. A recurve will permit a shorter bow than the simple straight limb bow for a given arrow energy, and this form was often preferred by archers in environments where long weapons could be cumbersome, such as in brush and forest terrain, or while on horseback.

Recurved limbs also put greater stress on the materials used to make the bow, and they may make more noise with the shot. Extreme recurves make the bow unstable when being strung. An unstrung recurve bow can have a confusing shape and many Native American weapons, when separated from their original owners and cultures, were incorrectly strung backwards and destroyed when attempts were made to shoot them. A test performed by Hepworth and Smith in 2002 of a preparation manufactured from bovine tendon and pearl glue and used in traditional Asiatic recurve bows showed that the composite "was found to absorb 18 MJ/m^{3} of energy to failure, comparable to carbon fibre composites, spring steel and butyl rubber."

== Historical use ==
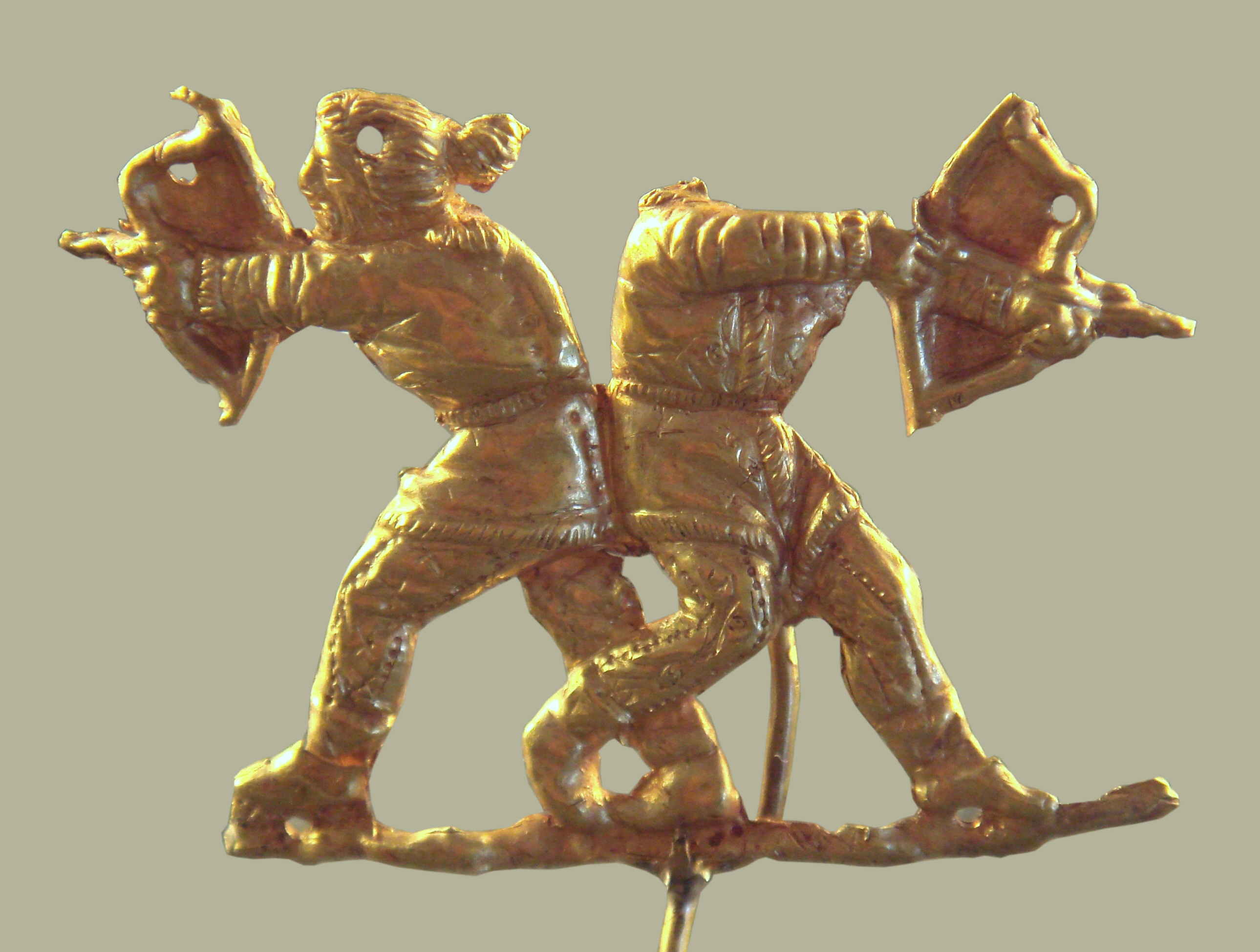
Scythian archers shooting with bows, Kerch, Ukraine (antique Panticapeum, 4th century BC)

Recurve bows made out of composite materials were used by, among other groups, the Persians, Parthians, Sarmatians, Scythians, Alans, Dacians, Cumans, Hyksos, Magyars, Huns, Bulgars, Greeks, Turks, Mongols, Koreans and Chinese.

The recurve bow spread to Egypt and much of Asia in the second millennium BC.

Perhaps the most ancient written record of the use of recurved bows is found Psalm 78:57 ("They were turned aside like a deceitful bow", in the King James version), which is dated by most scholars to the eighth century BC.

19th century Bible scholar Adam Clarke pointed out that "If a person, who is unskillful or weak, attempt to recurve and string one of these bows, if he take not great heed, it will spring back, and regain its quiescent position; and, perhaps, break his arm. And sometimes I have known it, when bent, to start aside, – regain its quiescent position, to my no small danger... this is precisely the kind of bow mentioned by Homer, Odyssey xxi, which none of Penelope's suitors could bend, called καμπυλα τοξα [kampula toxa] in the state of rest; but τοξον παλιντονον [toxon palintonon], the recurved bow when prepared for use."

The standard weapon of Roman imperial archers was a composite recurve, and the stiffening laths (also called siyah in Arabic/Asian bows and szarv (horn) in Hungarian bows) used to form the actual recurved ends have been found on Roman sites throughout the Empire, as far north as Bar Hill Fort on the Antonine Wall in Scotland.

The Turkish archer used recurve bows, which were manufactured from laminates of wood glued with animal tissue like horn and sinew, to great destructive effect during the reign of the Ottomans.

Its use by the Mongol armies allowed massed individuals on horseback to raid from the Pacific to central Europe, thanks to the relatively short length of recurve bows, with which archers could maneuver while seated on their mount. The rise of the Mongols can be partially attributed to the good range and power of the bows of Genghis Khan's armies. These bows were made of a bamboo core, with horn on the belly (facing towards the archer) and sinew on the back, bound together with animal glue.

During the Middle Ages composite recurve bows were used in the drier European countries because the laminate glue would not moisten and thereby lose its adhesive power; the all-wooden straight longbow was the normal form in wetter areas. Recurve bows depicted in the British Isles (see illustrations in "The Great War Bow") may have been composite weapons, or wooden bows with ends recurved by heat and force, or simply artistic licence.

The bows of many Indigenous North Americans were recurved, especially West Coast Indian bows.

Recurve bows went out of widespread use in warfare with the greater availability of effective firearms in various nations at the end of the 19th century.

In Ancient China, recurve bow had a long history in battles. During the battle between the Song dynasty and the states of Liao and Jin, the utilization of recurve bows was widely recorded. During the Ming Dynasty, a deeper modification was applied and named as the Ming-style recurve bow.

== Modern use ==
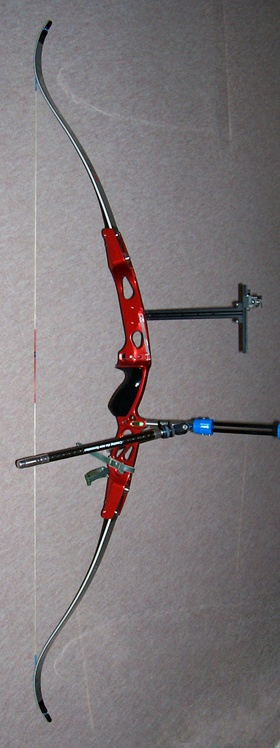
Early 21st century recurve bow

Self bows, composite bows, and laminated bows using the recurve form are still made and used by bowyers, amateurs, and professional archers.

The unqualified phrase "recurve bow" or just "a recurve" in modern archery circles usually refers to a typical modern recurve bow, as used by archers in the Olympics and many other competitive events. It employs advanced technologies and materials. The limbs are usually made from multiple layers of fibreglass, carbon and/or wood on a core of carbon foam or wood. The riser (the centre section of the bow) is generally separate and is constructed from wood, carbon, aluminium alloy or magnesium alloy. The term 'riser' is used because, in a one-piece bow, the centre section rises from the limbs in a taper to spread the stress. Several manufacturers produce risers made of carbon fibre (with metal fittings) or aluminium with carbon fibre. Risers for beginners are usually made of wood or plastic. The synthetic materials allow economic, predictable manufacture for consistent performance. The greater mass of a modern bow is in itself an aid to stability, and therefore to accuracy. However, accuracy is also related to a bow's draw weight, as well as how well an archer handles it. It is therefore imperative for an archer, particularly a beginner, never to overestimate their capabilities, and to choose a draw weight that is appropriate for their body build and level of experience.

The modern recurve was the only form of bow permitted in the Olympics until the 2028 Summer Olympics, where a mixed compound bow category was added (though the compound bow is permitted in some categories at the Paralympic Games). It is the most widely used by European and Asian sporting archers. There is a movement to have future Olympic Games include the compound bow in individual competition, due to its framework technology being more available and widespread, which would make competitive stat-tracking and testing easier.

The modern Olympic-style recurve is a development of the American flatbow, with rectangular-section limbs that taper towards the limb tips. Most recurves today are "take-down" bows; that is, the limbs can be detached from the riser, for ease of transportation and storage as well as interchangeability. Older recurves and some modern hunting recurves are one-piece bows. Hunters often prefer one-piece bows over take-down bows, because the limb pockets on take-down bows can make unwanted noise while drawing.

Barebow is another type of modern recurve bow. It usually uses the same riser and limbs as a recurve, but lacks a sight, stabilizers, and clicker. While they may still look similar, it is tuned differently with a negative tiller and a different weight distribution. This is due to the archer's anchor point being on the corner of the mouth instead of below the chin.

== Terminology ==
Diagram showing the parts of a modern recurve bow

Arrow rest
Where the arrow rests during draw. These may be simple fixed rests or may be spring-loaded or magnetic flip rests.
Back
The face of the bow on the opposite side to the string
Belly
The face of the bow on the same side as the string
Bow sight
An aiming aid attached to the riser
Brace height
The distance between the deepest part of the grip and the string; fistmele is the traditional term, referring to the equivalent length of a closed fist with the thumb extended, indicating the proper traditional distance used between the deepest part of the grip and the string.
Grip
The part of the bow held by the bow hand
Limbs
The upper and lower working parts of the bow, which come in a variety of different poundages
Nocking point
The place on the bowstring where the arrow nock is fitted
Riser
The rigid centre section of a bow to which the limbs are attached
String
The cord that attaches to both limb tips and transforms stored energy from the limbs into kinetic energy in the arrow
Sling
A strap or cord attached to the bow handle, wrist or fingers to prevent the bow from falling from the hand
Finger tab or thumb ring
A protection for the fingers that draw the string. Can also provide a better release performance. Usually made of leather.
Tiller
The difference between the limb-string distances measured where the limbs are attached to the riser. Usually the upper distance is slightly more than the bottom one, resulting in a positive tiller. Reflects the power-balance between both limbs.

== Other equipment ==
Archers often have many other pieces of equipment attached to their recurve bows, such as:

Clicker
a blade or wire device fitted to the riser, positioned to drop off the arrow when the archer has reached optimum draw length. Used correctly, this ensures the same cast-force each time. Many archers train themselves to shoot automatically when the clicker 'clicks' off the arrow.
Kisser
a button or nodule attached to the bowstring. The archer touches the kisser to the same spot on the face each time (usually the lips, hence the name) to give a consistent vertical reference.
Plunger button
a fine-tuning device consisting of a spring-cushioned tip inside a housing. The plunger button screws through the riser so that the tip emerges above the rest. The side of the arrow is in contact with the tip when the arrow is on the rest. The spring is tuned so that it allows a certain amount of movement of the arrow towards the riser on release, bringing the arrow to the ideal "centre shot" location. The plunger button is used to compensate for the arrow's flex since the arrow flexes as the string pushes onto it with a very high acceleration. The device is also known as a cushion plunger, pressure button, or Berger button.
Stabilizers
weight-bearing rods attached to a recurve bow to balance the bow to the archer's liking, and to dampen the effect of torque and dissipate vibration.

== See also ==
- Crossbow
- Mongol bow
- Turkish bow
- Flatbow
- Bow draw
