= Bow and arrow =

Ranged weapon system, sports equipment

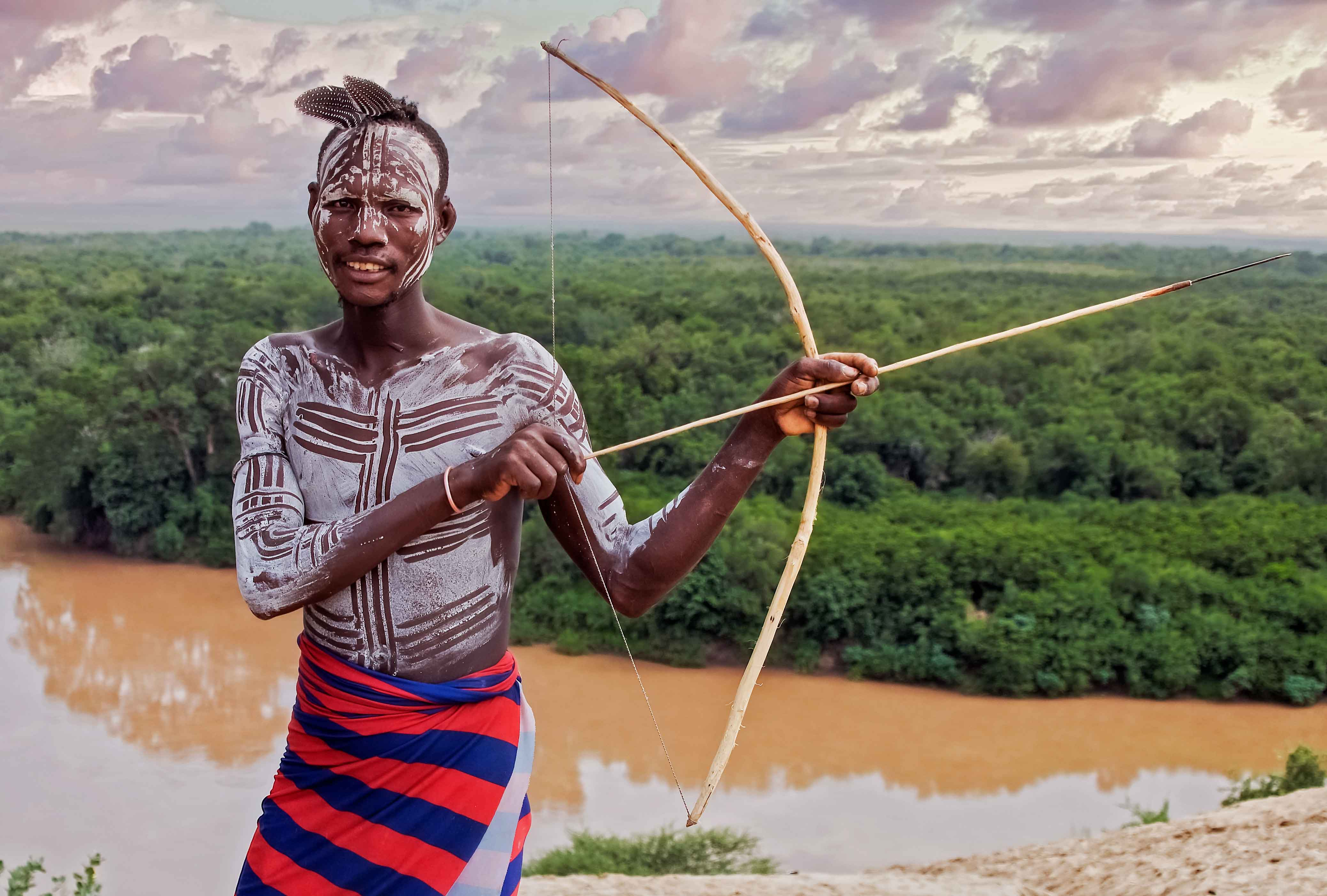
A Karo man holding a bow and arrow

The bow and arrow is a ranged weapon system consisting of an elastic launching device (bow) and long-shafted projectiles (arrows). Humans used bows and arrows for hunting and aggression long before recorded history, and the practice was common to many prehistoric cultures. They were important weapons of war from ancient history until the early modern period, when they were rendered increasingly obsolete by the development of the more powerful and accurate firearms. Today, bows and arrows are mostly used for hunting and sports.

Archery is the art, practice, or skill of using bows to shoot arrows. A person who shoots arrows with a bow is called a bowman or an archer. Someone who makes bows is known as a bowyer, someone who makes arrows is a fletcher, and someone who manufactures metal arrowheads is an arrowsmith.

== Basic design and use ==
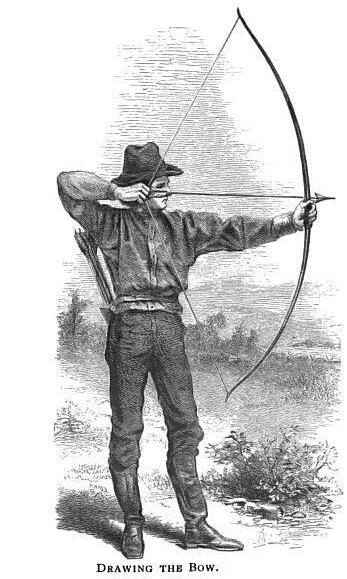
Drawing a bow, from a 1908 archery manual

A bow consists of a semi-rigid but elastic arc with a high-tensile bowstring joining the ends of the two limbs of the bow. An arrow is a projectile with a pointed tip and a long shaft with stabilizer fins (fletching) towards the back, with a narrow notch (nock) at the very end to contact the bowstring.

To load an arrow for shooting (nocking an arrow), the archer places an arrow across the middle of the bow with the bowstring in the arrow's nock. To shoot, the archer holds the bow at its center with one hand and pulls back (draws) the arrow and the bowstring with the other (typically the dominant hand). This flexes the two limbs of the bow rearwards, which perform the function of a pair of cantilever springs to store elastic energy.

While maintaining the draw, the archer typically aims the shot intuitively or by sighting along the arrow. Then the archer releases (looses) the draw, allowing the limbs' stored energy to convert into kinetic energy transmitted via the bowstring to the arrow, propelling it to fly forward with high velocity. The distance a bow can shoot is called its cast.

A container or bag for additional arrows for quick reloading is called a quiver.

When not in use, bows are generally kept unstrung, meaning one or both ends of the bowstring are detached from the bow. This removes all residual tension on the bow and can help prevent it from losing strength or elasticity over time. Many bow designs also let it straighten out more completely, reducing the space needed to store the bow. Returning the bowstring to its ready-to-use position is called stringing the bow.

== History ==
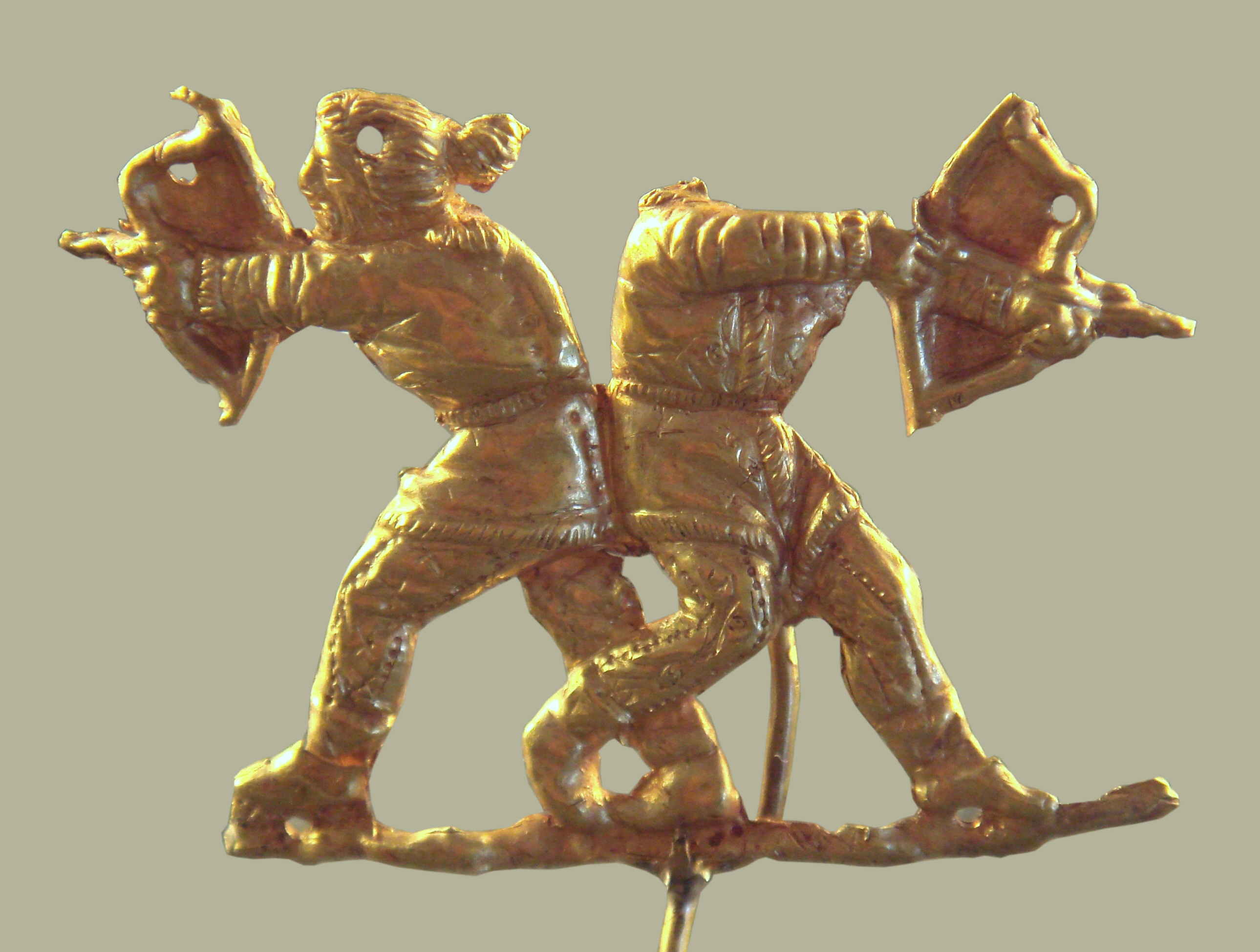
Scythians shooting with bows, Panticapeum (modern Kertch), 4th century BCE

The oldest known evidence of arrows comes from layers 20–21 in Obi-Rakhmat Grotto, Uzbekistan, some 80,000 years ago. Micro-points have been found, the right size for use as arrow-heads, too small for spear points and too large for blowgun darts. Traces of impact fractures, consistent with their use as projectile points, are identified. They may have been hafted to arrow shafts using locally-available bitumen.

In Sibudu Cave, South Africa, likely arrowheads have been found, dating from approximately 72,000–60,000 years ago.

Probable arrowheads from Fa Hien Cave, Sri Lanka have been dated to 48,000 years ago. "Bow-and-arrow hunting at the Sri Lankan site likely focused on monkeys and smaller animals, such as squirrels, Langley says. Remains of these creatures were found in the same sediment as the bone points."

Small stone points from the Mandrin Cave in Southern France, used some 54,000 years ago, have damage from use that indicates their use as projectile weapons, and some are too small (less than 10mm across as the base) for any practical use other than as arrowheads. They are associated with possibly the first groups of modern humans to leave Africa.

After the end of the last glacial period, some 12,000 years ago, the use of the bow seems to have spread to every inhabited region except for Australasia and most of Oceania. The reason for the absence of locally made bow and arrow technology from the Australian continent, when it was widely and commonly used elsewhere, has long been debated. It has recently been hypothesised that it is because the mechanical and physical properties of common Australian woods make them unsuitable for selfbows.

The earliest definite remains of bow and arrow from Europe are possible fragments from Germany found at Mannheim-Vogelstang dated 17,500–18,000 years ago, and at Stellmoor dated 11,000 years ago. Azilian points found in Grotte du Bichon, Switzerland, alongside the remains of both a bear and a hunter, with flint fragments found in the bear's third vertebra, suggest the use of arrows at 13,500 years ago.

Recent analyses of stone and bone projectile points from early Upper Paleolithic contexts suggest that some European Homo sapiens may have used bow-propelled arrows as early as 40,000–35,000 years ago, earlier than previously assumed.

At the site of Nataruk in Turkana County, Kenya, obsidian bladelets found embedded in a skull and within the thoracic cavity of another skeleton, suggest the use of stone-tipped arrows as weapons about 10,000 years ago.

The oldest extant bows in one piece are the elm Holmegaard bows from Denmark, which were dated to 9,000 BCE. Several bows from Holmegaard, Denmark, date 8,000 years ago. High-performance wooden bows are currently made following the Holmegaard design. The Stellmoor bow fragments from northern Germany were dated to about 8,000 BCE, but they were destroyed in Hamburg during the Second World War, before carbon 14 dating was available; their age is attributed by archaeological association.

Bow and arrow pictured on the coat of arms of the historical Finnish province of Savo

The bow was an important weapon for both hunting and warfare from prehistoric times until the widespread use of gunpowder weapons in the 16th century. It was also common in ancient warfare, although certain cultures would not favor them. Greek poet Archilocus expressed scorn for fighting with bows and slings.

The skill of Nubian archers was renowned in ancient Egypt and beyond. Their mastery of the bow gained their land the name Ta-Seti, "Land of the Bow" in Ancient Egyptian.

The bow was the national weapon of Persian kings, and images of them carrying it can be seen on Persian coins.

Beginning with the reign of William the Conqueror, the English longbow was England's principal ranged weapon until the end of the Middle Ages. Genghis Khan and his Mongol hordes conquered much of the Eurasian steppe using short bows. Native Americans used archery to hunt and defend themselves during the European colonization of the Americas.

Organised warfare with bows ended in the early to mid-17th century in Western Europe, but it persisted into the 19th century in Eastern cultures, including hunting and warfare in the New World. In the Canadian Arctic, bows were made until the end of the 20th century for hunting caribou, for instance at Igloolik. The bow has more recently been used as a weapon of tribal warfare in some parts of Sub-Saharan Africa; an example was documented in 2009 in Kenya when Kisii people and Kalenjin people clashed, resulting in four deaths.

The British upper class initiated a revival of archery as a sport in the late 18th century. Sir Ashton Lever, an antiquarian and collector, formed the Toxophilite Society in London in 1781, under the patronage of George IV, then Prince of Wales.

Bows and arrows have been used by modern special forces for survival and clandestine operations.

== Construction ==
=== Parts of the bow ===
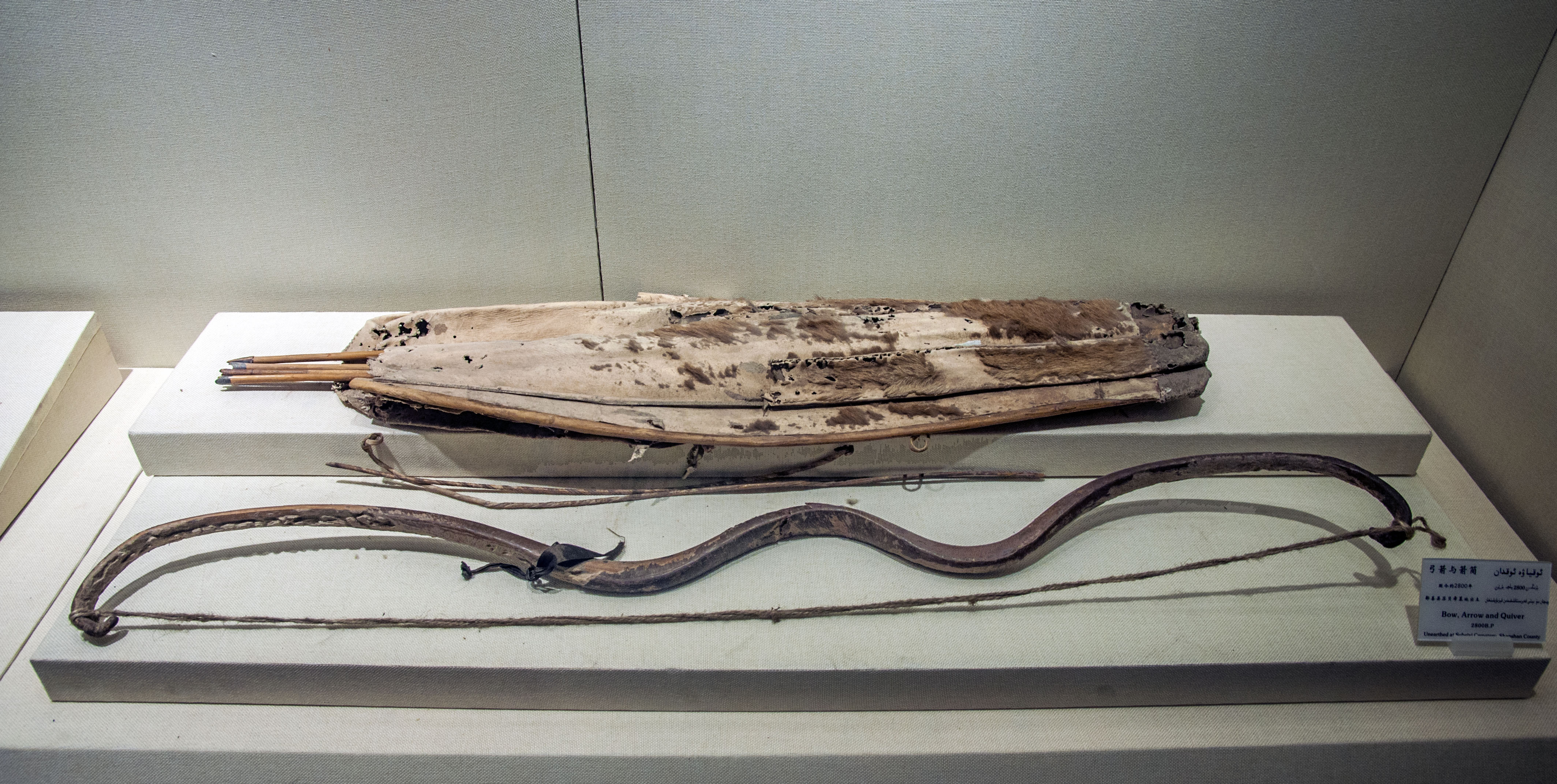
A Subeshi culture bow, circa 800 BCE, Xinjiang Museum

The basic elements of a modern bow are a pair of curved elastic limbs, traditionally made from wood, joined by a riser. However self bows such as the English longbow are made of a single piece of wood comprising both limbs and the grip. The ends of each limb are connected by a string known as the bow string. By pulling the string backwards the archer exerts compression force on the string-facing section, or belly, of the limbs as well as placing the outer section, or back, under tension. While the string is held, this stores the energy later released in putting the arrow to flight. The force required to hold the string stationary at full draw is often used to express the power of a bow, and is known as its draw weight, or weight. Other things being equal, a higher draw weight means a more powerful bow, which is able to project heavier arrows at the same velocity or the same arrow at a greater velocity.

The various parts of the bow can be subdivided into further sections. The topmost limb is known as the upper limb, while the bottom limb is the lower limb. At the tip of each limb is a nock, which is used to attach the bowstring to the limbs. The riser is usually divided into the grip, which is held by the archer, as well as the arrow rest and the bow window. The arrow rest is a small ledge or extension above the grip which the arrow rests upon while being aimed. The bow window is that part of the riser above the grip, which contains the arrow rest.

In bows drawn and held by hand, the maximum draw weight is determined by the strength of the archer. The maximum distance the string could be displaced and thus the longest arrow that could be loosed from it, a bow's draw length, is determined by the size of the archer.

A composite bow uses a combination of materials to create the limbs, allowing the use of materials specialized for the different functions of a bow limb. The classic composite bow uses wood for lightness and dimensional stability in the core, horn to store compression energy, and sinew for its ability to store energy in tension. Such bows, typically Asian, would often use a stiff end on the limb end, having the effect of a recurve. In this type of bow, this is known by the Arabic name 'siyah'.

Modern construction materials for bows include laminated wood, fiberglass, metals, and carbon fiber components.

=== Arrows ===
Schematic of an arrow showing its parts

An arrow usually consists of a shaft with an arrowhead attached to the front end, with fletchings and a nock at the other. Modern arrows are usually made from carbon fibre, aluminum, fiberglass, and wood shafts. Carbon shafts have the advantage that they do not bend or warp, but they can often be too light weight to shoot from some bows and are expensive. Aluminum shafts are less expensive than carbon shafts, but they can bend and warp from use. Wood shafts are the least expensive option but often will not be identical in weight and size to each other and break more often than the other types of shafts. Arrow sizes vary greatly across cultures and range from very short ones that require the use of special equipment to be shot to ones in use in the Amazon River jungles that are 2.6 m (8.5 feet) long. Most modern arrows are 55 to 75 cm (22 to 30 inches) in length.

Arrows come in many types, among which are breasted, bob-tailed, barreled, clout, and target. A breasted arrow is thickest at the area right behind the fletchings, and tapers towards the (nock) and head. A bob-tailed arrow is thickest right behind the head, and tapers to the nock. A barrelled arrow is thickest in the centre of the arrow. Target arrows are those arrows used for target shooting rather than warfare or hunting, and usually have simple arrowheads.

For safety reasons, a bow should never be shot without an arrow nocked; without an arrow, the energy that is normally transferred into the projectile is instead directed back into the bow itself, which will cause damage to the bow's limbs.

=== Arrowheads ===
The end of the arrow that is designed to hit the target is called the arrowhead. Usually, these are separate items that are attached to the arrow shaft by either tangs or sockets. Materials used in the past for arrowheads include flint, bone, horn, or metal. Most modern arrowheads are made of steel, but wood and other traditional materials are still used occasionally. A number of different types of arrowheads are known, with the most common being bodkins, broadheads, and piles. Bodkin heads are simple spikes made of metal of various shapes, designed to pierce armour. A broadhead arrowhead is usually triangular or leaf-shaped and has a sharpened edge or edges. Broadheads are commonly used for hunting. A pile arrowhead is a simple metal cone, either sharpened to a point or somewhat blunt, that is used mainly for target shooting. A pile head is the same diameter as the arrow shaft and is usually just fitted over the tip of the arrow. Other heads are known, including the blunt head, which is flat at the end and is used for hunting small game or birds, and is designed to not pierce the target nor embed itself in trees or other objects and make recovery difficult. Another type of arrowhead is a barbed head, usually used in warfare or hunting.

=== Bowstrings ===
Bowstrings may have a nocking point marked on them, which serves to mark where the arrow is fitted to the bowstring before shooting. The area around the nocking point is usually bound with thread to protect the area around the nocking point from wear by the archer's hands. This section is called the serving. At one end of the bowstring a loop is formed, which is permanent. The other end of the bowstring also has a loop, but this is not permanently formed into the bowstring but is constructed by tying a knot into the string to form a loop. Traditionally this knot is known as the archer's knot, but is a form of the timber hitch. The knot can be adjusted to lengthen or shorten the bowstring. The adjustable loop is known as the "tail". The string is often twisted (this being called the "flemish twist").

Bowstrings have been constructed of many materials throughout history, including fibres such as flax, silk, and hemp. Other materials used were animal guts, animal sinews, and rawhide. Modern fibres such as Dacron or Kevlar are now used in commercial bowstring construction, as well as steel wires in some compound bows. Compound bows have a mechanical system of pulley cams over which the bowstring is wound. Nylon is useful only in emergency situations, as it stretches too much.

== Types of bows ==
There is no single accepted system of classification of bows. Bows may be described by various characteristics including the materials used, the length of the draw that they permit, the shape of the bow in sideways view, and the shape of the limb in cross-section.

Commonly used descriptors for bows include:

=== By side profile ===
- Straight bow: a bow approximately straight in side-view profile. These bows are referred to as straight, although there may be minor curves in the natural wood, and the bow may have a "set" or curvature that a wooden bow takes after use.
- Recurve bow: a bow with the tips curving away from the archer. The curves straighten out as the bow is drawn and the return of the tip to its curved state after release of the arrow adds extra velocity to the arrow.
- Reflex bow: a bow whose entire limbs curve away from the archer when unstrung. The curves are opposite to the direction in which the bow flexes while drawn.

=== By material ===
- Self bow: a bow made from one piece of wood.
- Composite bow: a bow made of more than one material.

=== By cross-section of limb ===
- Longbow: a self bow with limbs rounded in cross-section, about the same height as the archer so as to allow a full draw, usually over 1.5 m (5 feet) long. The traditional English longbow was made of yew wood, but other woods are also used.
- Flatbow: the limbs are approximately rectangular in cross-section. This was traditional in many Native American societies and was found to be the most efficient shape for bow limbs by American engineers in the 20th century

=== Other characteristics ===
- Takedown bow: a bow that can be disassembled for transportation, usually consisting of three parts: two limbs and a riser, in addition to the string.
- Compound bow: a bow with mechanical amplifiers to aid with drawing the bowstring. Usually, these amplifiers are asymmetric pulleys called cams (though they are not actually cams) at the ends of the limbs, which provide a mechanical advantage (known as the let-off) while holding the bow in full draw. Such bows typically have high draw weights and are usually drawn with a release aid with a trigger mechanism for a consistently clean release.
- Crossbow: a bow mounted horizontally on a frame similar to a firearm stock, which has a locking mechanism for holding the bowstring at full draw. Crossbows typically shoot arrow-like darts called bolts or "quarrels", rather than normal arrows.
- Footbow: a bow meant to be used with the legs and arms while lying down and used in the current distance record for the furthest arrow shot.

== See also ==
- Archer's paradox
- Sling (weapon)
- Slingshot
