= Holmegaard bow =

Self bows from Northern European bogs, c. 7000 BC

The Holmegaard bows are a series of self bows found in the bogs of Northern Europe dating from c. 7000 BC in the Mesolithic age. They are named after the Holmegaard area of Denmark in which the first and earliest specimens were found, and are the oldest bows discovered anywhere in the world.

== Description ==
The shape of the Holmegaard bows is their distinctive feature, having wide, parallel limbs and a biconvex midsection with the tips ending in a point. The handle is deep, narrow and remains stiff while the bow is drawn. The bows are typically between 170 and 180 cm in length and less than 6 cm wide. It has been suggested that only the inner limbs of a Holmegaard style bow bend in use, but this is incorrect. They instead bend to their tips.

All Mesolithic bows from this area are made of elm, the best European bow wood apart from yew. (Yew spread to modern Denmark only in about the third millennium BCE).

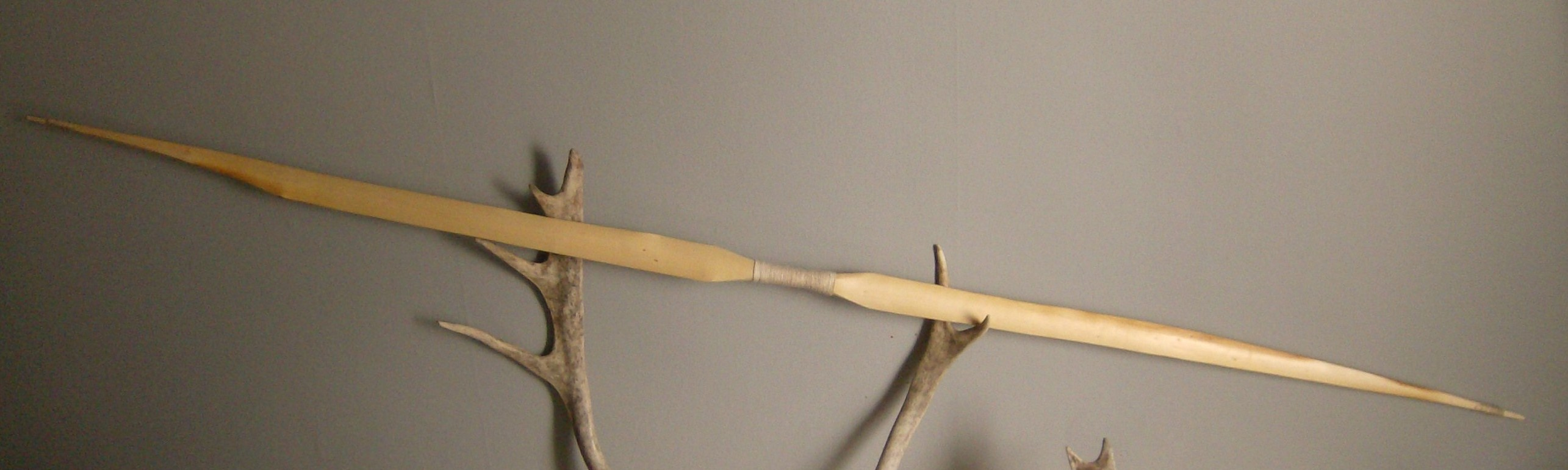
An example of a Holmegaard type bow.

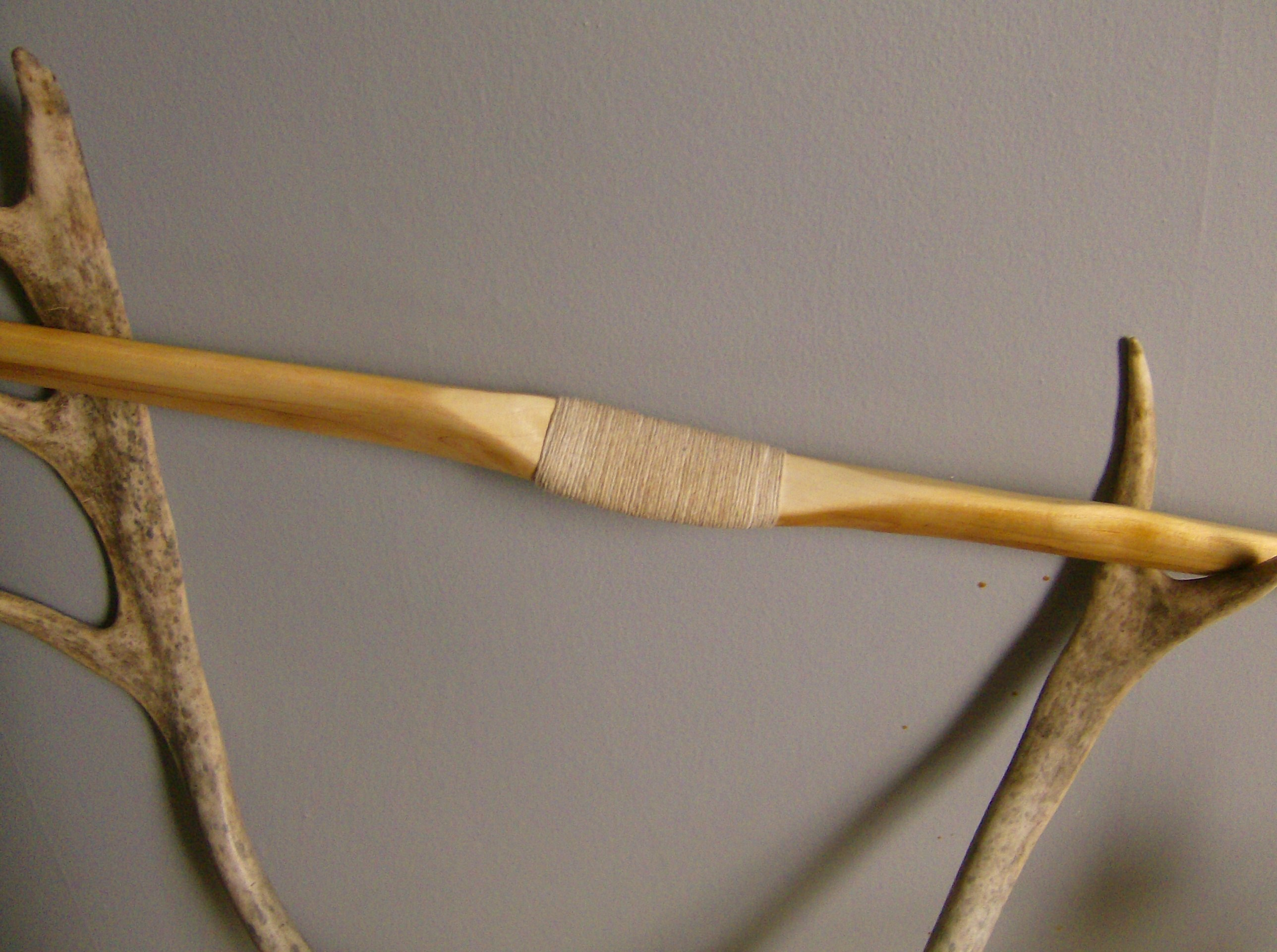
A closeup of the handle.

== Use ==
The Holmegaard bows were initially believed to have been made "backwards", that is with wood removed from the back and the belly made convex. This may be the result of a comparison with the English longbow that has a flat back and a convex belly. Many successful replicas were made in this fashion even though working the back of the bow cuts the wood fibres and endangers it.

Subsequent analysis suggested the back may have instead been convex with the flattened surface being the belly. This is more efficient for woods like elm which are relatively strong in tension. The compression strain on the belly is evenly distributed on the flat surface which reduces string follow. Later yew bows are generally narrower, yew being better suited for narrow bows than elm.

== Efficiency ==
The Holmegaard design, under the previous interpretation of a bow that bends only in the broad inner part of the limbs, may be able to shoot an arrow faster and further due to the light, long and stiff outer limbs which act as levers when propelling the arrow. This is the same principle that explains why a dart can be propelled faster from an Atlatl than from throwing alone.

Such "Holmegaard style" bows are used in flight archery competitions. For flight bows, an optimum between the length of the stiff tips and the draw force of the bow is desired. If the outer limbs are too long, their weight exceeds the capacity of the energy stored in the inner limbs. The outer limbs can also become unstable if made too thin. In modern Holmegaard-style bows, the outer limbs are much thicker than the inner limbs to prevent the outer limbs from bending excessively.

The original specimens were not finished for such high performance. There is doubt as to whether the biconvex shape of the mid-limbs is due to poor preservation in the bogs. The more recent Holmegaards do not have well defined "shoulders" and have more semblance to the American flatbow.

Due to the wide working limbs, Holmegaard bows can be made from more common, lower density woods such as yew, maple, ash, and oak, as well as elm.
