= Academy Bank =

American commercial bank

- Type: Bank
- Industry: Banking
- Founded: June 15, 1966; 60 years ago
- Headquarters: Kansas City, Missouri, United States
- Number of locations: 80 (2026)
- Key people: Paul Holewinski (CEO)
- Parent: Dickinson Financial Corporation
- Website: academybank.com

Academy Bank is an American commercial bank headquartered in Kansas City, Missouri. It is a subsidiary of Dickinson Financial Corporation, which also owns Armed Forces Bank. The bank provides community and commercial banking services. Its history includes a Walmart-based branch network, consolidation of banking charters and several bank acquisitions.

== History ==
Academy Bank was founded in June 1966 as Air Academy National Bank and acquired by Dickinson Financial Corporation in 2000. In 2002, Air Academy National Bank operated two locations at the United States Air Force Academy, while an Academy Bank division had opened 11 branches in Walmart stores between 2000 and 2002. The Air Force Academy locations served military communities, while the Academy Bank division operated branches in Walmart stores.

In 2015, Dickinson Financial consolidated SunBank and Southern Commerce into Academy Bank and transferred 25 Walmart branches from Armed Forces Bank to Academy. Academy focused on commercial lending, while Armed Forces Bank retained its military-banking focus.

Academy's branch network remained closely associated with Walmart locations. In 2016, most of its 88 branches were in Walmart stores, and the bank planned a stand-alone branch in Fairway, Kansas, using video banking and a smaller physical footprint. Between 2015 and mid-2018, Academy closed nearly a quarter of its offices, reducing the network to 75 locations. By 2019, the bank was planning growth in the Kansas City area, Denver and Scottsdale, using video banking and smaller branches.

Academy acquired Merit Bank in 2017 and KCB Bank in 2019, and both institutions were merged into Academy. In 2024, Academy entered into an agreement to acquire Mountain View Bank of Commerce in Colorado. The proposed transaction was the bank's third deal since 2017.

== Operations ==
Academy provides commercial lending and business banking services through its branches and digital platforms. As of November 2026, the bank operated 80 domestic locations across 5 U.S. states.

Academy's retail presence developed from branches located in Walmart stores and later included stand-alone offices. Its branch model used video tellers or virtual bankers, smaller offices and, in some locations, community-oriented features alongside automated and remote services.

Academy's sponsor-banking operations include a cross-functional fintech committee, formal review of prospective partners, and limits on the concentration of deposits and revenue from individual relationships.

== Overdraft fees and public-policy scrutiny ==
In 2020, Academy's overdraft revenue amounted to 236% of its profits. Academy was one of the institutions whose overdraft income exceeded profits.

Academy's combined overdraft and non-sufficient-funds revenue fell from $29.4 million in 2019 to $13.4 million in 2023, a decline of 54%. These figures measure fee revenue rather than profit.

== Recognition ==
The bank was included on Forbes annual Best-In-State Banks list from 2018 to 2021 and from 2023 to 2026 and was ranked 227th in 2023 and 233rd in 2025 on Fortune list of America's Most Innovative Companies.
