= Binary cam =

Design for the pulley system of a compound bow

The binary cam is a design for the pulley system of a compound bow. Craig Yehle, director of research and development at Bowtech Archery, received a patent for the design on December 11, 2007. Bowtech started equipping its bows with the new cam design in the 2005 model year.

== Mechanics ==
The binary cam is described as a modified twin cam setup where each cam is slaved to the other via a loop of string connecting the two cams. This is contrasted with a typical twin cam setup where the ends of the bowstring are physically anchored onto each of the bow limbs.

As a twin cam system relies on each cam rotating independently, based solely on the force of the string and the resistance of the bow limbs being absolutely symmetrical, there is room for a twin cam system to "lose tune" through wear and tear, string stretch, or just general age. The effect of a detuned twin cam bow is that the two cams rotate out of sync with each other, causing the bowstring to accelerate in two alternating directions upon release. This causes a number of adverse consequences, the most obvious being unsteady arrow flight.

The binary cam overcomes this by 'slaving' each cam to the other; as one cam is unable to rotate without the direct equivalent action of the other, the two rotate in near perfect synchronization, with any possible differences in rotation automatically correcting themselves as the shot cycle is completed. In effect, a binary cam bow never needs cam-timing tuning, whereas a high end twin cam equivalent might need it done as often as every few months in order to maintain critical accuracy. Bowtech pays Rex Darlington of Darton Archery royalties for use of this cam design.
