= Armed Forces Bank =

Bank for U.S. military members

- Industry: Banking
- Founded: 1907; 118 years ago
- Headquarters: Fort Leavenworth, Kansas, U.S.
- Parent: Dickinson Financial Corporation
- Website: afbank.com

Armed Forces Bank (AFB) is a bank serving members of the United States Armed Forces, veterans, and their family members.

== History ==
Armed Forces Bank was founded in 1907 in Fort Leavenworth, Kansas, where it is currently headquartered. AFB and its sister bank, Academy Bank, are owned by Dickinson Financial Corporation (DFC), which is headquartered in Kansas City, Missouri.

== Military connections ==
Armed Forces Bank operates the most locations on military bases in the United States, including 23 locations on 17 bases.

Much of the Bank's retail team is also composed of people with direct connections to the U.S. military, including veterans, reservists, and military dependents.

== Community ==
In July 2022, the Bank launched a podcast titled "Militarily Speaking", which discusses finances and overall life for the military community.

AFB and DFC also support some philanthropy organizations, including Fisher House Foundation and the Armed Services YMCA.

== Criticism ==
As of 2021, AFB relies on overdraft fees for over half its net income, leading to calls for consequences from bank regulators.
