= Cable-backed bow =

Type of ranged weapon

The cable backed bow, showing the bow (a) bearing the tensioned cable (b) along the face of it, attached by bindings (c). Finally, the bow strung with the main string (d).

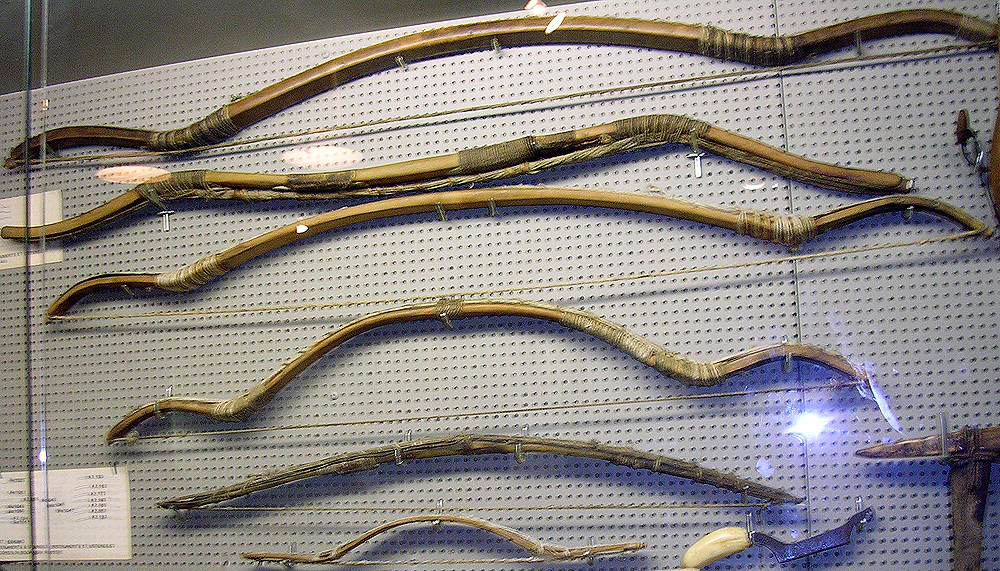
Several Inuit cable-backed bows. The shapes of the top four are an interesting mix of deflex, reflex, and decurve.

A cable-backed bow is a bow reinforced with a cable on the back. The cable is made from either animal, vegetable or synthetic fibers and is tightened to increase the strength of the bow. A cable will relieve tension stress from the back of the bow by raising its neutral plane: the border between the back of the bow that stretches and the belly of the bow that compresses when bent. A good cable-backed bow can thus be made of poor-quality wood, weak in tension. The material, the diameter, the distance from the back of the wooden element, and the level of stress (tightness) of the cable determines how much it relieves tension stress from the wooden element of the bow and increases the power of the shot.

The Inuit of the Arctic used sinew cables on their short bows of driftwood, baleen, horn or antler to make them unlikely to break in tension, and to increase their power. The cables are attached to the bow at several points on each limb with a series of half-hitches and then tightened by inserting a small toggle in the bundle of strings and twisting. These bows could be reflexed, deflexed, decurved, or straight.

One variety of cable-backed bow is the Penobscot bow or Wabenaki bow, invented by Frank Loring (Chief Big Thunder) about 1900. It consists of a small bow attached by cables on the back of a larger main bow.

== See also ==
- Flatbow
- Longbow
- Composite bow
