= Armed Forces Bikers Veterans Charity =

- Abbreviation: AFBVC
- Formation: 25 May 2011
- Legal status: Charity
- Purpose: Support for current and former members of the British Armed Forces, and their families
- Location: National
- Region served: United Kingdom
- Members: Open to veterans and armed forces supporters
- Chairman Trustee: Steve (Rocky) Regan
- Vice Chairman: Bill (Pilgrim) Aiken
- Key people: Board of Trustees - Suzy (Shots) Edwards, Ian (Coric) McCormick
- Main organ: Board of Trustees
- Website: www.armedforcesbikers.co.uk

The Armed Forces Bikers Veterans Charity (AFB) is a United Kingdom-based motorcycle charity which aims to assist former serving members of the armed forces in charitable need as a result of injury or other harmful experience suffered during their service, to resettle and rehabilitate into civilian life, also to relieve the needs of former members of the armed forces and their families.

== History ==
The Armed Forces Bikers was founded on 25 May 2011 by former members of Army Bikers. The AFB are Side Patched Riders who gained charity status on 5 July 2012. UK Registered Charity Number 1147967 and Scottish Charity Number SC043586. The AFB is authorised to collect funds, operate and organise events in Northern Ireland under section 167 of the Charities Act (NI) 2008. All proceeds donated to the AFB are used for the benefit of veterans in charitable need. The AFB employs no staff, pays no wages or expenses and is run entirely by volunteers. The charity's activities are funded by AFB Trading Ltd, a non-profit online shop whose only share holder is the charity.

== Functions ==
Every year on the third weekend in July, motorcyclists from the Armed Forces Bikers and their supporters take part in the AFB 500 Challenge Weekend to raise money to fund its grant policy in addition to regular fundraising event organised in different regions of United Kingdom.

The AFB also organise social events in many regions of the country for the benefit of its members and supporters.

== On-line assistance ==
The AFB has an online grant form and grant policy.
