= Flatbow =

Type of bow shape in archery

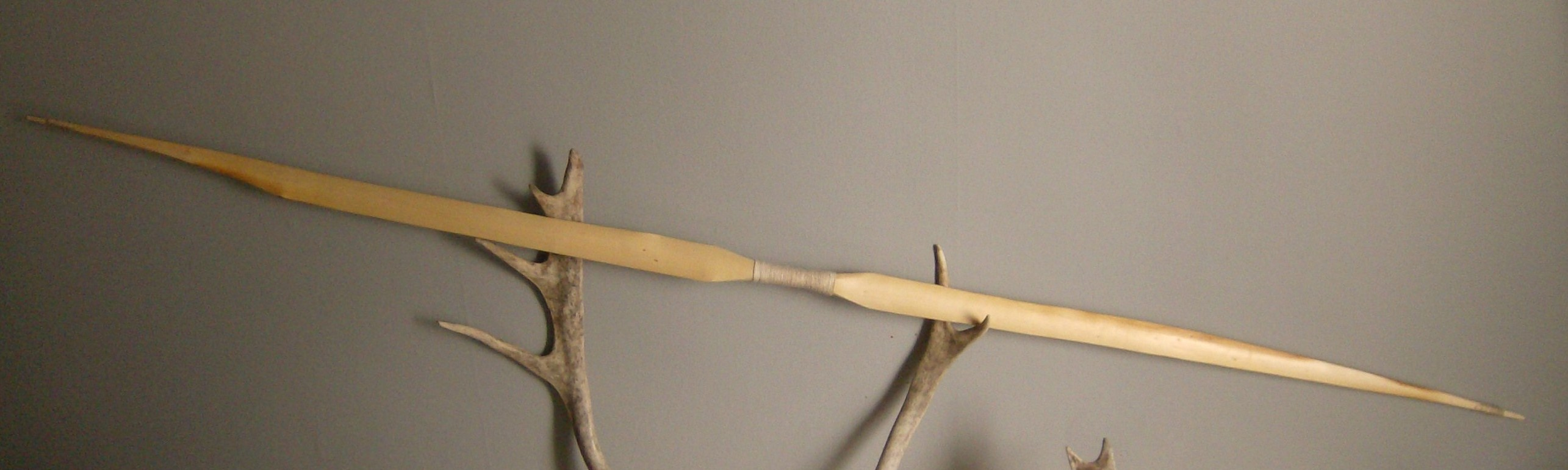
A replica of the Holmegaard bow, a flatbow from the Mesolithic period

A flatbow is a bow with non-recurved, flat, relatively wide limbs that are approximately rectangular in cross-section. Because the limbs are relatively wide, flatbows will usually narrow and become deeper at the handle, with a rounded, non-bending handle for easier grip. This design differs from that of a longbow, which has rounded limbs that are circular or D-shaped in cross-section, and is usually widest at the handle. A flatbow can be just as long as a longbow, but can also be very short. Typical lengths would be 68–70 inches (172.5–178 cm) for a flatbow, 70–72 inches (178–183 cm) for an English longbow, and 72–76 inches (183–193 cm) for a warbow-weight English longbow; but these styles may easily overlap each other. Traditional flatbows are usually wooden self bows (bows made of one solid piece of wood), though laminated and composite flatbows have been made in ancient and modern times. Modern flatbows commonly use fiberglass.

== Advantages of a rectangular cross-section ==
The flatbow is a superior bow design for almost all materials because the stress is more evenly spread out than with rounded limb sections. A bow limb is essentially a flexed beam undergoing bending, and in any flexed beam the farther from the neutral axis (line in the middle of the flexing beam which is not under tension or compression: see diagram in Bending article) the more stress there is within the material. When a limb is rounded, as in a longbow, some material sticks out farther from the neutral axis, and thus is put under greater stress. In a flatbow, the flat belly and back ensure that all of the most strained material is a uniform distance from the neutral axis, spreading the load over a wider limb, minimizing stress and making weaker woods far less likely to fail (break or become permanently bent and lose the resilience needed in a bow). Only particularly resilient timbers can make an effective and powerful wooden longbow.

== Suitable timbers ==
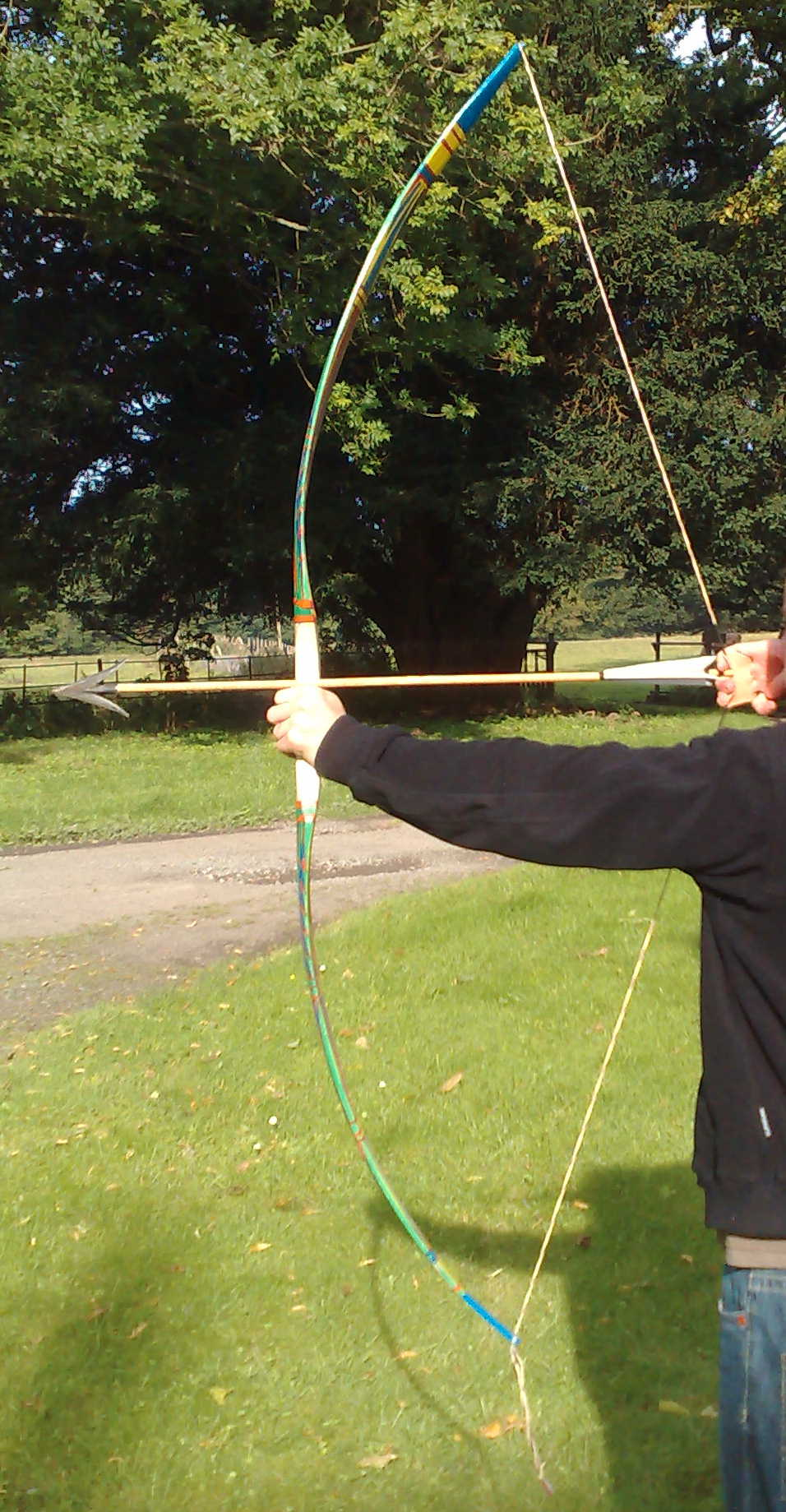
Side view of flat bow made of hazel wood; the slightly twisted upper limb does not significantly affect performance

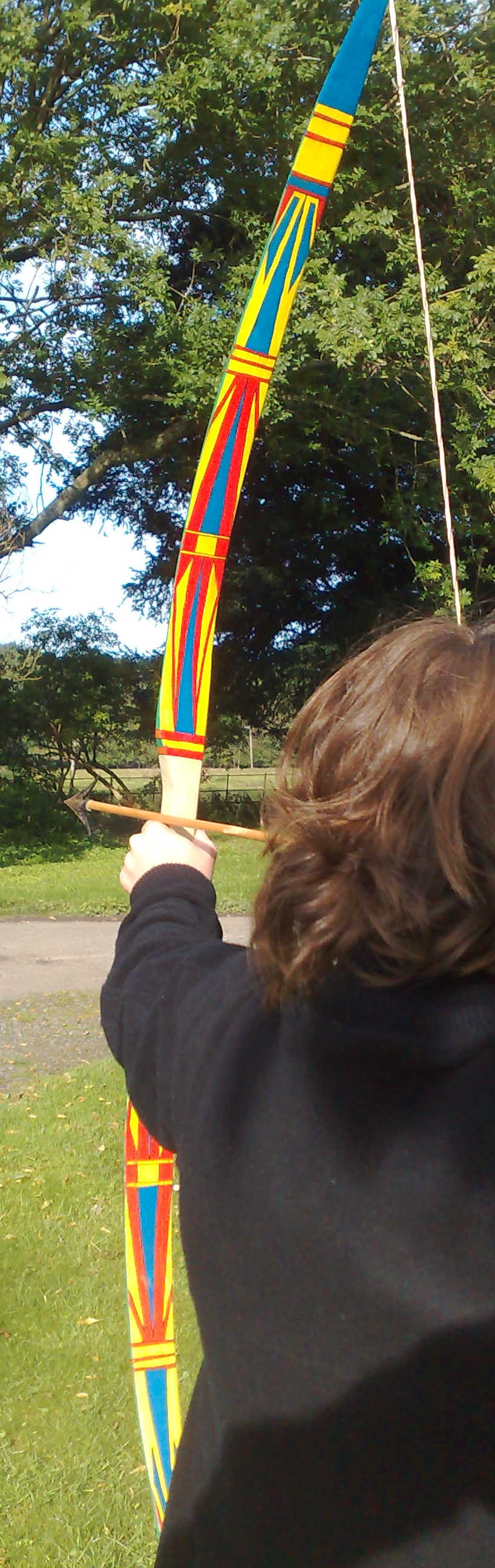
Belly view of the same flat bow

In most parts of the world, common hardwoods may be used to create excellent bows. Suitable and easily available timbers include elm (used in ancient Europe, as evidenced by bows pulled from European bogs), maple, sycamore, hazel, and ash. The flatbow design also lends itself to very dense, high strength woods such as hickory and especially osage orange (a wood favored by many Native American tribes for bow making).

== Disadvantages of a rectangular cross-section ==
Compared with a narrow, rounded longbow design, the bowyer needs to start with a wider stave, take more time to achieve an approximately rectangular cross-section, and may need to cut through growth rings on the back of the bow.

== Historic use ==
Flatbows were used by Native American tribes such as the Hupa, Karok, and Wampanoag, prehistoric ancient Europeans, some Inuit tribes, Finno-Ugric nations and a number of other pre-gunpowder societies for hunting and warfare because, unlike longbows, good flatbows can be made from a wide variety of timbers. Flatbows fell from favour in Europe after the Mesolithic, replaced with yew longbows. The trade of yew wood for English longbows was such that it depleted the stocks of yew over a huge area. Flatbows are currently used by the Sentinelese tribes of the Andaman Islands. Flatbows survived in cold areas, such as Finland, where yew does not grow naturally because of the unsuitable climate. The traditional Finnish flatbow is made either from ash, or as birch/pine laminate with siyahs made of hagberry and glued together with glue, made by cooking descaled skins of perch with minimum amount of water, until one will get a solution like thick, slimy, grey porridge. This kind of glue will never be all waterproof and the bows were most often wrapped with thin strips of birch bark, protecting them against weather and moisture. Yew was available as an imported material (it grows in Southern Sweden and Denmark and it was even cultivated there) for bows in Finland, but it was considered not suitable for serious use, because it is fragile at cold temperatures and the season for hunting for furs is in January and February, when the furs are at their best.

== American longbow ==
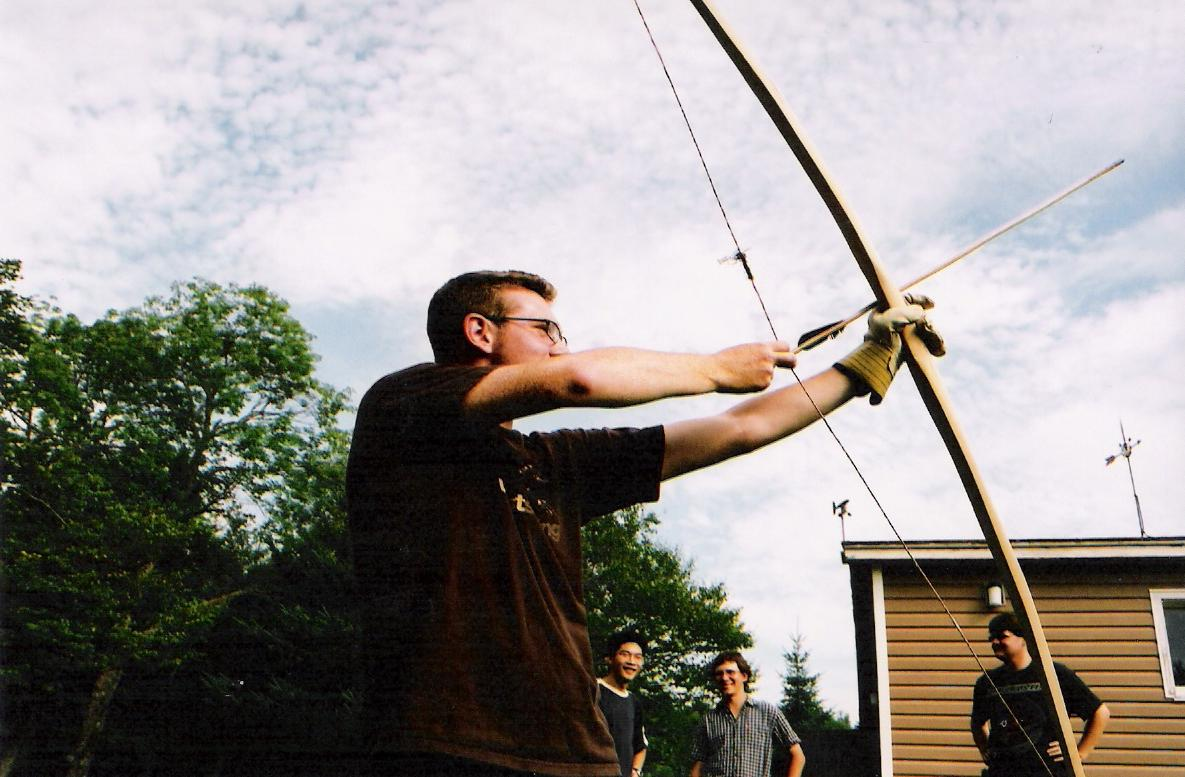
An American flatbow made out of ash

The American longbow, also known as the American semi-longbow (ASL), and sometimes incorrectly called the American flatbow (see above for the correct definition of flatbow), was developed in the 1930s. It resulted from scientific investigation into the best cross-sectional shape for a bow limb. This research was expected to explain why the English longbow's D-section was superior to all other extant designs. Instead, it showed that the best cross-section was a simple rectangle. The American longbow was developed by applying these research findings to the English longbow. The result was a more efficient and stable bow which can be made from more common woods.

One of the primary differences between an American longbow and a flatbow is that the flatbow has wide limbs and a narrow handle section. The American longbow has narrow limbs and a handle that is of similar width. This is an important distinction.

The American longbow was popularised by Howard Hill and quickly displaced the English longbow as the preferred bow for target shooting at the time. Howard himself referred to it as a semi-longbow. It was not long before Howard started to use fiberglass on the back and belly of his bows. Consequently, the ASL is sometimes referred to as a Hill style bow.

The American Longbow is not to be confused with what is now marketed as a modern longbow or hybrid longbow which was called a semi-recurve prior to the 1990s. IFAA (International Field Archery Association) does not recognise modern longbows as longbows, and these are required to be shot in the Traditional Recurve Division. ABA (Australian Bowhunters Association) and TAA (Traditional Archery Australia) also don't recognise the modern longbow or hybrid Longbow as an American Longbow or 'traditional longbow' (separate from an historical longbow) and these are shot in a different divisions (Modern and Hybrid respectively).

== See also ==
- Cable-backed bow
- Horse archer
