= Obi-Rakhmat Grotto =

Cave and archaeological site in Uzbekistan

- Shown within Uzbekistan Obi-Rakhmat Grotto (Uzbekistan) Obi-Rakhmat Grotto (West and Central Asia)
- 41°34′08.8″N 70°08′00.3″E
- Periods: Middle Paleolithic
- Associated with: Neanderthals
- Location: Talassky Alatau Range
- Region: Tien Shan Mountains

Site notes
- Material: limestone
- Elevation: 1,250 m (4,100 ft)
- Height: 11.8 metres (39 ft)
- Length: 20 metres (66 ft)
- Width: 9 metres (30 ft)
- Excavation dates: 1962
- Archaeologists: M. M. Gerasimov, H. K. Nasretdinov

The Obi-Rakhmat Grotto is a Middle Paleolithic prehistoric site that yielded Neanderthal fossils. It is a shallow karst cave near the junction of the Chatkal and Pskem Rivers at the southwestern end of the Talassky Alatau Range in the Tien Shan Mountains, 100 km (62 mi) northeast of Tashkent, Uzbekistan.

== Excavations ==
The Obi-Rakhmat Grotto was discovered in 1962 by a team from the Institute of History and Archaeology of Uzbekistan, headed by A. R. Mukhamedzhanov. Initial excavations were carried out under the supervision of M. M. Gerasimov and H. K. Nasretdinov and from 1964 to 1965 by R. H. Suleimanov. An international multidisciplinary team resumed excavations in 1998 under the direction of Anatoly Derevyanko, Andrei Krivoshapkin and Patrick Wrinn.

== Stratigraphy ==
The cave is 9 m (30 ft) long, 20 m (66 ft) wide at the entrance and 11.8 m (38.71 ft) high and sitting at an elevation of 1,250 m (4,100 ft),

The sequence of deposits has a depth of about 10 m (33 ft) and divides into 22 stratigraphic units, based on texture and archaeological content. The rich assemblages of lithic artifacts suggests prolonged Neanderthal occupation.

- Artefacts: core-burins on large flakes, unidirectional blade and flake cores, (mostly retouched blades and retouched pointed blades, while other common types include burins, atypical end scrapers, sidescrapers (grattoir de côté) and Mousterian points) and Levallois forms. The Levallois forms are concentrated in the basal layers, especially stratum 19. The principal raw material is local petrified limestone.

Obi-Rakhmat's tool industry differs in only minor ways from the classic and elongated Levallois points of Kara-Bom. Obi-Rakhmat's finds share features of both the late Middle Paleolithic and the early Upper Paleolithic artifacts of Southwest Asia and the Altai Mountains. It appears that the Upper Paleolithic in the Altai emerged from a local Middle Paleolithic culture established in the area around 100,000 to 50,000 years ago. Based on material of the most recent excavations from 2007 to 2009 there is reason to assume that the Obi-Rakhmat lithic artefacts represent a transitional Middle-to-Upper Paleolithic industry.

Stratum 19 seems to represent a series of exceptionally intensive occupational episodes because of the high density of finds and the presence of charcoal, burnt bones and artefacts.

== Chronology ==
(Uranium-thorium datings of travertine sediments range between 70,000–100,000 years BP. These results are less secure due to the high uranium content and the presence of detritus, which contaminates dated sediments. ESR analysis of tooth enamel for eight Bovidae give an age estimation of ca. 57,000 to 73,000 years BP (strata 12–14) and ca. 87,000 years BP (basal stratum 21.1). The preliminary results of OSL dating on sediments from several profile locations gave uniform ages for all cultural successions: stratum 5.1 (56,000 ± 3200 years), stratum 8.1 (60,100 ± 3000 years), and stratum 21.2 (61,400 ± 3600 years):

Parts of the sequence is beyond the limit of sensitivity of the C^{14} dating method. However layer 9, dated to 42,100 years BP is well within the limit. Possibly, the age of layer 14.1 (48,800 years BP) may be a minimal estimate, but more study is necessary to precisely determine the age. The true age of layer 14 at Obi-Rakhmat site is still open to discussion.

== Fauna ==
The faunal assemblage is dominated by the Siberian mountain goat (Capra sibirica) and red deer (Cervus elaphus), which constitute 90% of the identified fossils. Other faunal remains include sheep (Ovis sp.), wild boar (Sus scrofa), fox (Vulpes vulpes) and marmot (Marmota sp.). Carnivore remains are rare.

Evidence of human modification of the bones including cut marks, conchoidal impact, scars and burning, is consistently present. The lithic artefacts and faunal remains recovered at Obi-Rakhmat suggest that the site was repeatedly used by hominins as a short-term hunting and butchery station.

== Hominin remains ==
=== OR 1 ===
In 2003, hominin remains were recovered from stratum 16. They consist of 6 isolated permanent upper teeth and 121 cranial fragments from a single juvenile.

=== Morphology ===
Six isolated permanent teeth were found. They consisted of an upper lateral incisor, upper third premolar, upper fourth premolar, upper first molar, and an upper second molar, as well as 121 cranial fragments. All of the teeth found had complete crowns with developed roots. The varying size of the roots in each tooth make it difficult to determine if they are damaged, or the length they are because of development. It was determined that all of the pieces belonged to a 9-12-year-old juvenile. The sex of this particular fossil remains unknown. The teeth found have Neanderthal features, as some of them show Taurodontism, which is primarily found in the Neanderthal morphology. Studies of the pieces of cranium found are more ambiguous and harder to link to Neanderthals. The Parietal bone has a stronger likeness to anatomically modern humans, while other bones of the skull can be linked to Neanderthal craniums. Most researchers believe that this particular fossil is a Neanderthal because of the analysis of its dentition.

The Obi-Rakhmat fossil expresses a relatively Neanderthal-like dentition coupled with more ambiguous cranial anatomy (e.g., its parietal size and aspects of the external surface of its temporal) that does not conform to existing descriptions of sub-adult Neanderthals. It represents an individual of roughly 9 to 12 years of age at death, estimated from the examination of relative root development and degree of dental wear.

The sub-adult bone yielded non-calibrated dates ranging from 29,990 ± 500 years BP to 37,800 ± 450 years BP. To date, the best chronological estimate for the hominid remains from Obi-Rakhmat is ca. 60,000 to 90,000 years BP and 70,000 years BP.

=== DNA analysis ===
The mitochondrial DNA (mtDNA) sequences from the Obi-Rakhmat sub-adult (OR-1) and Teshik Tash child fall within the European Neanderthal mtDNA variation, showing that both individuals belonged to a population related to European and western Asian Neanderthals. However, the Teshik Tash mtDNA sequence seems to be more closely related to the mtDNA sequence from Scladina in western Europe than to the sequence from Okladnikov Cave. The absence of deep mtDNA divergence shows that Central Asian, Caucasian and European Neanderthals were not separated for a long time, supporting the view that Central Asia (most of the Russian plains) was relatively recently colonized by Neanderthals, maybe not before an exceptionally warm episode 125,000 years ago.

== See also ==
- Denisova Cave
