= Laminated bow =

Type of archery bow

A laminated bow is an archery bow in which different materials are laminated together to form the bow stave itself. Traditional composite bows are normally not included, although their construction with horn, wood, and sinew might bring them within the above definition.

== History ==
The Egyptians, Scythians and Assyrians had been making laminate bows out of combinations of wood, horn and sinew as early as the 2nd millennium BCE.

The oldest known laminated bows (made entirely of wood) belong to the Scythian cultures. A Scythian wood-laminate bow was discovered in the 19th century in Ukraine and is currently held at the Institute of Archaeology. It was constructed by laminating several fine strips of willow and alder wood, bound with fish glue and wrapped in birch bark. It had a double-curved shape, was 32 in (810 mm) long and may have been capable of shooting arrows at distances of over 500 yd (460 m).

In 2006, an international expedition to the Altai Mountains region in western Mongolia uncovered a laminate bow, associated with the Scythian Pazyryk culture. It is of a complicated construction, with many fine strips of wood glued side-by-side, and a wooden reinforcement plate glued to the handle. The entire bow was wrapped in spiral form with rawhide and birch bark; in addition to reinforcing the construction this also made the bow resistant to water and humidity. The bow is dated to the 3rd century BCE.

The modern Japanese yumi is a laminated bow. Laminated bows in Japan first appeared around 1000 CE, during the late Heian or Kamakura period. They were made of wood and bamboo laminated with glue, evolving from simple bamboo-backed bows to complex bows of five piece construction (higo yumi) by the 1600s. The Sámi and their neighbours across northern Eurasia also made laminated bows for centuries. Hejaz Arabs may also have used a laminated bow.

Reading Museum is in the possession of an Inuit-made laminate bow. It was made in the Pelly Bay area of Nunavut, Canada, and consists of three shims of bone laminated near the handle region, and reinforced at the joints with rawhide. It has two short driftwood arrows with bone points. They reflect the shortage of wood in the Arctic region and the improvisation of pre-contact indigenous Inuit.
