= Clout archery =

Form of archery involving shooting at flags from a distance

Archers shooting at the GNAS Clout Championships 2007

Clout archery is a form of archery in which archers shoot arrows at a flag (known as "the Clout") from a relatively long distance and score points depending on how close each arrow lands to the flag.

Scoring zones are defined by maximum radii from the flag pole. Each arrow scores points depending on which scoring zone it enters the ground in. An arrow embedded in the flag pole is counted as being in the highest scoring zone. If an arrow is lying on the ground, it is considered to be in the scoring zone in which its point lies.

The scoring zones may be marked on the ground. Where this is not practical, a non-stretch rope or chain marked with the radii of the scoring zones is attached to the flag pole and swept around it to determine which arrows are in which zones.

A designated person collects the arrows in each zone, sorts them into sets, and lays them on the ground. Each archer in turn points to their arrows and calls out the scores in descending order.

A single clout round consists of three dozen arrows, shot in ends of 6 arrows. Tournaments typically consist of a double clout round, in which a total of six dozen arrows is shot.

== Archery GB clout ==
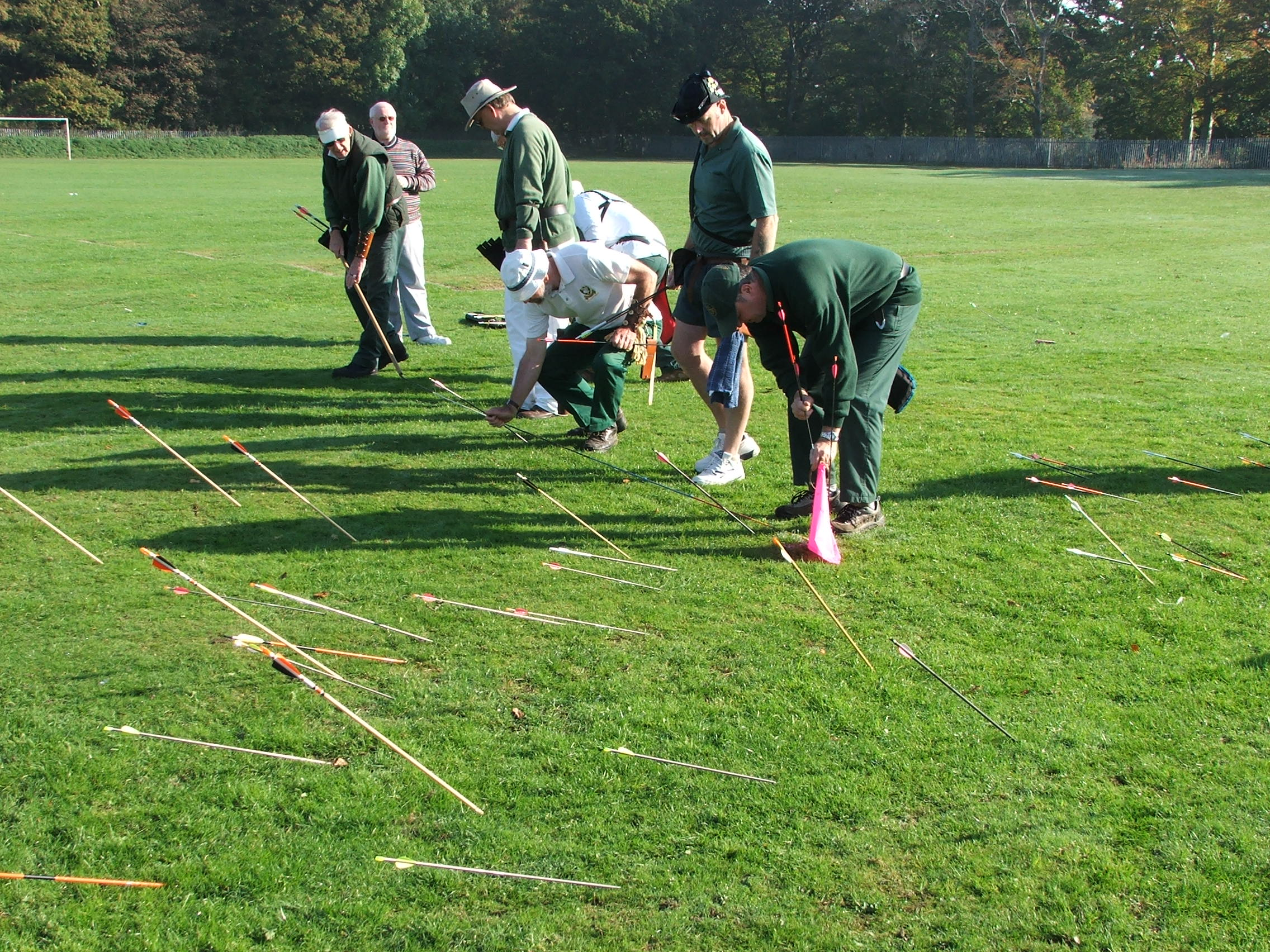
Archers collecting arrows for each scoring zone

The Archery GB version of clout is used in the United Kingdom. The information in this section is drawn from Part 7 Clout Shooting of the Rules of Shooting (January 2023).

Flags are set at specified distances for combinations of age and gender. The archer's bow type does not affect the distance the archer shoots.

Distances defined by Archery GB
Category		Distance
Gentlemen		180 yd (160 m)
Ladies		140 yd (130 m)
Juniors	under 21	140 yd (130 m)
Juniors	under 18	120 yd (110 m)
Juniors	under 16	100 yd (91 m)
Juniors	under 14 & under 12	80 yd (75 m)

ArcheryGB clout scoring
Maximum radius	Points scored
18 inches (45 cm)	5
3 feet (0.9 m)	4
6 feet (2 m)	3
9 feet (2.5 m)	2
12 feet (3.5 m)	1
> 12 feet (3.5 m)	0

Each flag consists of a 12-inch (30 cm) square piece of coloured fabric on a short softwood pole, the flag to be as close to the ground as is practical.

Shooting may be "one way" or "two way":

- one way shooting: a single shooting line and a single set of flags are set up at opposite ends of the range. The archers shoot from the shooting line towards the flags, walk to the flags without their bows to score and collect their arrows, then walk back to the shooting line to continue shooting in the same direction.
- two-way shooting: two shooting lines and two sets of flags are set up. One shooting line and one set of flags is placed at one end of the range; the other shooting line and other set of flags is placed at the other end. The archers shoot from one shooting line towards one set of flags, walk to the flags with their bows to score and collect their arrows, then turn around and shoot towards the other set of flags.

A minimum overshoot is required behind each set of flags.

Most Archery GB clout shoots are one-way.

Each arrow scores points depending on which scoring zone it lands in. Scoring zones are defined by maximum radii from the flag pole.

== BLBS clout ==
The British Long-Bow Society has its own form of clout shooting. The Society restricts the archers to the use of English longbows and wooden arrows.

Ladies shoot 120 yards (110 m), gentlemen 180 yards (160 m). BLBS clouts are always two-way.

The target is a 30-inch (75 cm) diameter, white, resting on a frame at 45 degrees to the ground with a 4-inch (10 cm) central black spot. Concentric rings are marked at 30 inches (75 cm), 4 feet (1.2 m), 7 feet (2 m), 10 feet (3 m) and 13 feet (4 m) from the centre.

Scoring is 6 for a clout, down to 1 for the outside ring. 2 rounds of 36 arrows in 12 ends of 3 are shot to make a 'Double Clout Round'

At the Woodmen of Arden's traditional shoots, the 'marker' at the target end steps from behind his screen, lies on his back and waves his top hat in the air to signify that a clout has been scored.

== WA clout ==
WA distances
Gender	Bow type	Distance
Men	Recurve	165 m (180 yd)
Men	Compound	185 m (200 yd)
Women	Recurve	125 m (135 yd)
Women	Compound	165 m (180 yd)

The WA version of clout is used worldwide. The information in this section is drawn from Book 5 Miscellaneous of the WA Constitution and Rules. (WA 2008)

Flags are set at specified distances for combinations of gender and bow type.

The WA rules do not define any separate distances for juniors or for longbows, though tournament organisers will often introduce such additional distances.

Each flag consists of a piece of coloured fabric not exceeding 80 cm (30 inches) high and 30 cm (12 inches) wide on a softwood pole, the flag to be no more than 50 cm (20 inches) from the ground.

Shooting may only be "one way".

WA scoring zones
Maximum radius	Points scored
1.5 m (5 ft)	5
3 m (10 ft)	4
4.5 m (15 ft)	3
6 m (20 ft)	2
7.5 m (25 ft)	1
> 7.5 m (25 ft)	0

== Australian clout ==
AA distances
metres
180 m (200 yd)
165 m (180 yd)
145 m (159 yd)
125 m (137 yd)
100 m (110 yd)

AA scoring zones
Maximum radius	Points scored
0.75 m (2.5 ft)	10
1.5 m (5 ft)	9
2.25 m (7.5 ft)	8
3 m (10 ft)	7
3.75 m (12.5 ft)	6
4.5 m (15 ft)	5
5.25 m (17 ft)	4
6 m (20 ft)	3
6.75 m (22 ft)	2
7.5 m (25 ft)	1
> 7.5 m (25 ft)	0

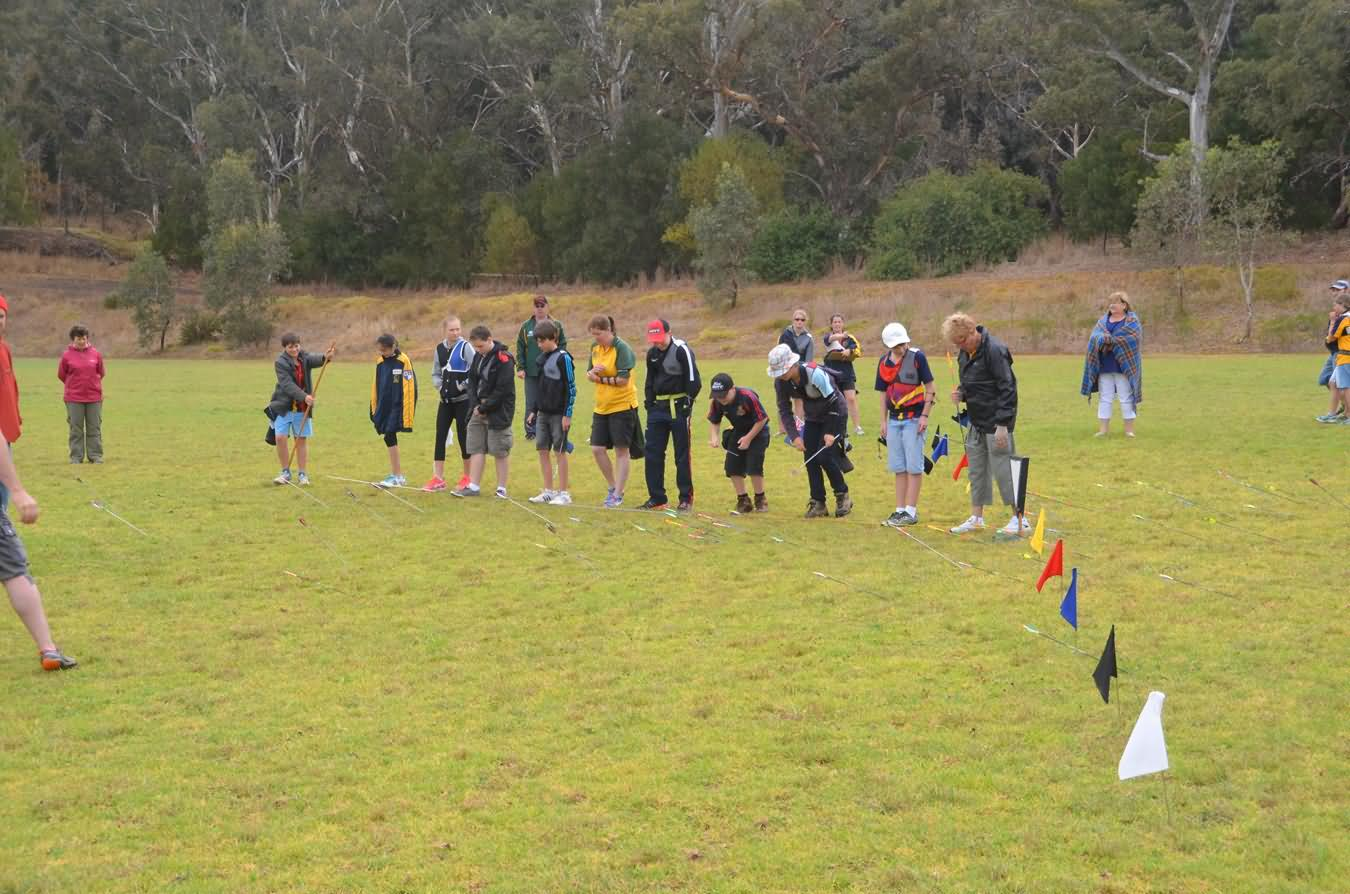
Scoring an Australian clout at Lobethal, South Australia

The Archery Australia version of clout is used in Australia. The information in this section is drawn from Section 12 Clout Archery of the Archery Australia Constitution and Rules. (AUST – online version)

Several possible shooting distances are defined. The archer selects the distance he or she wants to shoot, though for record purposes only certain combinations of age class, gender, bow division and distance are recognised.

The same clout target may be used for archers shooting at different distances. A shooting line is set up for each distance and the shooting is staggered so that each distance is shot with safety in mind. All archers shoot at the same time.

Each clout consists of a point-down triangular structure (usually made from laminated cardboard, so as to prevent arrows passing through) not exceeding 45 cm (18 inches) high and 35 cm (14 inches) wide at its widest point on a suitable (e.g. softwood) pole, the clout to be 8 cm (3 inches) from the ground. Small flags are placed on each side of the clout at 1.5 m (5 feet) intervals, so that the archers can see where the outer edges of the even-numbered scoring zones are. The flags are colored as (from the centre), gold, red, blue, black and white (i.e. the colours of an archery target).

Shooting is only in one direction (generally to the south).

Each arrow scores points depending on which scoring zone it lands in. Scoring zones are defined by maximum radii from the flag pole. There are ten zones in Australian clout. Zones may be marked on the ground, but these are not used for scoring. Only the scoring zones marked on the rope or chain are used for scoring.

== See also ==
- Archery
- Target archery
- Field archery
- History of archery
- Arrow
- Bow
