= Patrick Huston =

British archer (born 1996)

Personal information
- Full name: Patrick Huston
- Born: 5 January 1996 (age 30) Belfast, Northern Ireland, United Kingdom
- Height: 1.83 m (6 ft 0 in)
- Weight: 88 kg (194 lb)

Sport
- Country: United Kingdom
- Sport: Archery
- Event: Recurve
- Club: East Belfast Archery Club
- Coached by: Richard Priestman
Medal record
Men's recurve archery
Representing Great Britain
World Games
| Silver medal – second place | 2025 Chengdu | Individual |
World Championships
| Bronze medal – third place | 2017 Mexico City | Mixed team recurve |
World Field Championships
| Gold medal – first place | 2014 Zagreb | Junior Men’s Team |
| Bronze medal – third place | 2014 Zagreb | Junior Men |
| Bronze medal – third place | 2022 Yankton | Individual |
World Youth Championships
| Gold medal – first place | 2013 Wuxi | Cadet Individual |
| Gold medal – first place | 2013 Wuxi | Cadet Mixed Team |
European Games
| Silver medal – second place | 2019 Minsk | Mixed team recurve |
European Championships
| Silver medal – second place | 2016 Nottingham | Team |
| Bronze medal – third place | 2016 Nottingham | Individual |
European Field Championships
| Gold medal – first place | 2013 Terni | Junior Men |
| Bronze medal – third place | 2013 Terni | Junior Men’s Team |
| Silver medal – second place | 2015 Rzeszów | Junior Men |
| Silver medal – second place | 2017 Mokrice | Individual |
| Bronze medal – third place | 2017 Mokrice | Men’s Team |
Indoor World Cup
| Gold medal – first place | 2015 Marrakesh | Men’s Individual |
| Silver medal – second place | 2017 Marrakesh | Individual |
| Silver medal – second place | 2017 GT Open | Individual |
World Cup
| Gold medal – first place | 2018 Antalya | Men’s Team |
World Ranking Event
| Gold medal – first place | 2017 Veronica's Cup | Individual |
| Gold medal – first place | 2017 Veronica's Cup | Mixed Team |

Patrick Huston (born 5 January 1996) is a British two-time Olympian archer from Northern Ireland. He captured three world championship titles under the youth level, and eventually competed as a member of the two person archery squad of Team GB at the 2016 Summer Olympics, in Rio, losing the first round match to the eventual champion Ku Bon-chan of South Korea. In the Tokyo 2020 Olympics his best result was a men's team 5th. Huston currently lives near Lilleshall National Sporting Centre and trained full-time under senior national coach Richard Priestman for Archery UK, while remaining a loyal founding member of East Belfast Archery Club. World ranking 14 at 16 January 2023

== Early life ==
Born and raised in Belfast to parents Adrian and Felicity Huston, both of whom previously worked as tax inspectors, Huston became involved in archery as an eight-year-old pupil at Cabin Hill Primary School. Under the tutelage of British longbow champion and his teacher Audrey Needham, Huston began to show his potential to the sport by joining and serving as a mainstay of Campbell College's archery club.

Upon his entry to the Northern Ireland Elite Squad as a fourteen-year-old, Huston trained part-time as an archer, and eventually started competing in both local and regional tournaments regularly. In September 2011, Huston founded his very own East Belfast Archery Club across the Tullycarnet Community Centre. In 2014 he left Campbell College to train full-time at Lillleshall National Sporting Centre.

== Career ==
The 2013 season saw him rising to the prominence on the international archery scene, collecting a set of two Gold medals each in the individual and team recurve respectively at the World Youth Championships in Wuxi, China. At the European Field Archery Championships in Terni, Italy, he won the Gold individuals Junior Men's Recurve, and also Bronze in the Recurve Junior Men's Team. With his early success in archery, Huston was named by the British Olympic Committee (BOA) as one of the country's prospective sportspeople nominated for the 2013 Olympic Athlete of the Year award.

2014 and Huston continued to extend his career with a team Gold (Junior Men's Team) in Zagreb, Croatia at the World Archery Field Championship.

2015 season saw him eclipse the world 70-metre record (348 out of 360) at the Archery GB National Series in Exmouth, and by capturing his first individual gold medal under the senior division at the opening stage of the World Archery Cup series in Marrakesh, Morocco. Leading up to his Olympic debut in Rio de Janeiro, Huston won a bronze medal in the men's individual recurve at the 2016 European Championships in Nottingham to secure a quota place on Team GB's Olympic archery squad.

2016 and at the Summer Olympics, Huston was selected to compete as a lone male archer for the British squad, shooting only in the individual recurve tournament. First, he recorded a total score of 656 points, including 22 targets of a perfect ten, to obtain the thirty-eighth seed from a field of 64 archers in the classification round. Heading to the knockout stage on the third day of the Games, Huston confidently overcame the Dutchman and London 2012 fourth-place finalist Rick van der Ven with a two-set advantage at 6–4 in the opening round, before he lost his subsequent match on three straight sets to the eventual champion Ku Bon-chan of South Korea. He ended the year with an individual bronze Junior Men's Recurve medal at the Dublin World field championships.

2017 - September saw him make history by becoming the first archer to win the Great Britain National Series Recurve title three times in a row. He also secured in Slovenia (World Ranking Event) - Gold Men's Recurve & Gold Recurve Mixed Team in Target discipline. In the European Field championships (also Slovenia) - Silver Men's Recurve & Bronze Men's Recurve Team. In Target at the World Championships in Mexico City he secured Bronze in the Recurve Mixed Team with team-mate Naomi Folkard. Indoor World Cup in Marrakesh he won Silver in Men's Recurve. Silver Men's Recurve at the World Cup stage in Luxembourg.

2018 saw a Bronze Men's Team at the World Cup in Antalya.

2019 - May - Huston was selected to compete in the 2019 European Games in Minsk, Belarus joining over 100 other athletes in 10 different sports, coming home with Silver in Mixed Team Recurve. In June he and 5 Archery GB colleagues secured the maximum 6 places at the Tokyo 2020 Olympics - a 3-woman team and a 3-man team. At the Aphrodite Cup in Cyprus he won Gold in the Mixed Team and Silver in the Men's Recurve individual.

2020 was a year of virtually no International competitions due to Covid. The Tokyo 2020 Olympics were deferred for one year.

2021 saw him reach the final four in the Men's Recurve Individual competition at the Paris Archery World Cup Stage 3. July will see him compete in his second Olympics (the delayed Tokyo 2020 Games).

As of June 2021 he is ranked 106th in the World.

2021 July saw the delayed Tokyo 2020 Olympics. Huston finished with a 5th in the Recurve Men's Team, 8th in the Mixed Team with Sarah Bettles, and 33rd Individual.

2022 brought success in the UK winning the National Series for a record 5th time. He won a bronze medal at the World Field Archery Championships in Birmingham, Alabama.

2023 and by 16 January had a career-best World ranking of 14th.
