= Phyllis Griffiths (archer) =

English archer and coach

Phyllis Griffiths was an English archer and archery coach. In 1986, aged 64 or 67, she entered the Guinness Book of Records by setting a world record for the most arrows shot in a 24-hour period. She scored 31,000 in 76 Portsmouth rounds.

== Life ==
Griffiths lived in Holsworthy, Devon, where she taught archery to local disabled people at The Fun Club. In 2007 she was honoured with a Grand National Archery Society plaque for her contributions to British archery.
