= Arden, Warwickshire =

Forest and area in the West Midlands, England

Arden
- This map illustrates the approximate extent of the Kingdom of Mercia in the 7th century, with the Forest of Arden situated between the Rivers Severn, Avon, and Trent.
- Interactive map of Arden

Geography
- Location: West Midlands, Warwickshire, Worcestershire, Shropshire.

The Forest of Arden is a territory and cultural reference point in the English West Midlands, that in antiquity and into the Early Modern Period covered much of that district: 'This great forest once extended across a wide band of Middle England, as far as the River Trent in the north and the River Severn in the south'. It therefore included much of Warwickshire, and parts of Shropshire, Staffordshire, the West Midlands, and Worcestershire. It is associated with William Shakespeare and is the setting of some of his dramas. The 'forest' did not necessarily denote continuous woodland, "but a large predominantly wooded area with many clearings and areas of cultivation''.

The Forest of Arden area may be said to fall within the Roman roads which bounded the territory within: in the east by Icknield Street, in the south by the Salt Road (the modern Alcester to Stratford Road), in the south east by the Fosse Way, and in the north and west by Watling Street. The Gough Map shows this traditional extent of the forest.

More recently the shorter term Arden has been used to describe a smaller area primarily concentrated in the historic county of Warwickshire and parts of the modern West Midlands metropolitan county.

== History ==
=== Early history ===
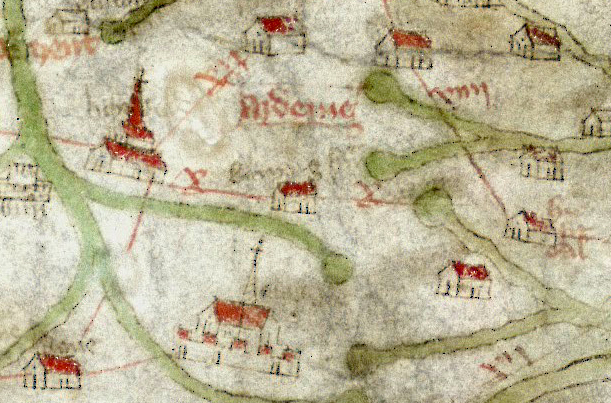
Birmingham illustrated on the fourteenth century Gough Map, shown within the Forest of Arden on the road between Lichfield (left) and Droitwich (right)

Believed to be derived from a Brythonic word ardu- "high" (cf. Welsh: ardd), by extension "highland", the area was formerly thickly forested and known as the Forest of Arden. Located near the geographical centre of England, the Forest of Arden, through which no Roman roads were built, was bounded by the Roman roads Icknield Street, Watling Street, Fosse Way, and a prehistoric salt track leading from Droitwich. It included the north-western half of the traditional county of Warwick, stretching from Stratford-upon-Avon in the south to Tamworth in the north, and as well as areas that are now the large settlements of Birmingham, Coventry and Shrewsbury, in addition to areas that are still largely rural with numerous areas of woodland. A significant settlement in the forest was the town Henley-in-Arden (in a valley of the River Alne, approximately 15 miles southeast of Birmingham), the site of an Iron Age hillfort.

Wide lands in this district were held in the time of Edward the Confessor by Alwin, whose son Thurkill "of Arden", founded the family of this name. The Domesday book reveals that in 1086 the Forest of Arden was comparatively lightly settled, and poor in terms of agricultural wealth.

An ancient mark stone known as Coughton Cross is still present at the southwestern corner of the forest, at the junction of Icknield Street (now A435) and the salt track, now the southern end of the frontage of Coughton Court, and is owned by the National Trust. According to local tradition, travellers prayed here for safe passage through the forest.

Arms of the Arden family

Thorkell of Arden, a descendant of the ruling family of Mercia, was one of the few major English landowners who retained extensive properties after the Norman conquest. His progeny, the Arden family, remained prominent in the area for centuries. By the 14th century, under Sir Henry de Arden, the most prominent Ardens had their primary estate at Park Hall, Castle Bromwich, Solihull. Connection to this ancient family was important in the identity work of the Dudley family in the sixteenth century.

Mary Arden, mother of William Shakespeare, was a member of this prominent West Midlands family, who had also had a prominent centre of power in Stockport in the 1500s.

From around 1162, until the suppression of their order in 1312, the Knights Templar owned a preceptory at Temple Balsall in the middle of the Forest of Arden. The property then passed to the Knights Hospitaller, who held it until the Reformation during the 16th century.

During the medieval era it is believed the forest began to become enclosed and deforested.

=== Early modern period ===
Robert Catesby, leader of the Gunpowder Plot of 1605, was a native of Lapworth, a village in Arden. It is believed that many local families across the Arden area had resisted the Reformation and retained Catholic sympathies, possibly including the family of Shakespeare, whose paternal ancestors were from the Balsall area.

Many of the key engagements of English Civil War of 1642 – 1651 were fought in the Arden area, such as the Battle of Camp Hill.

== Culture and cultural references ==
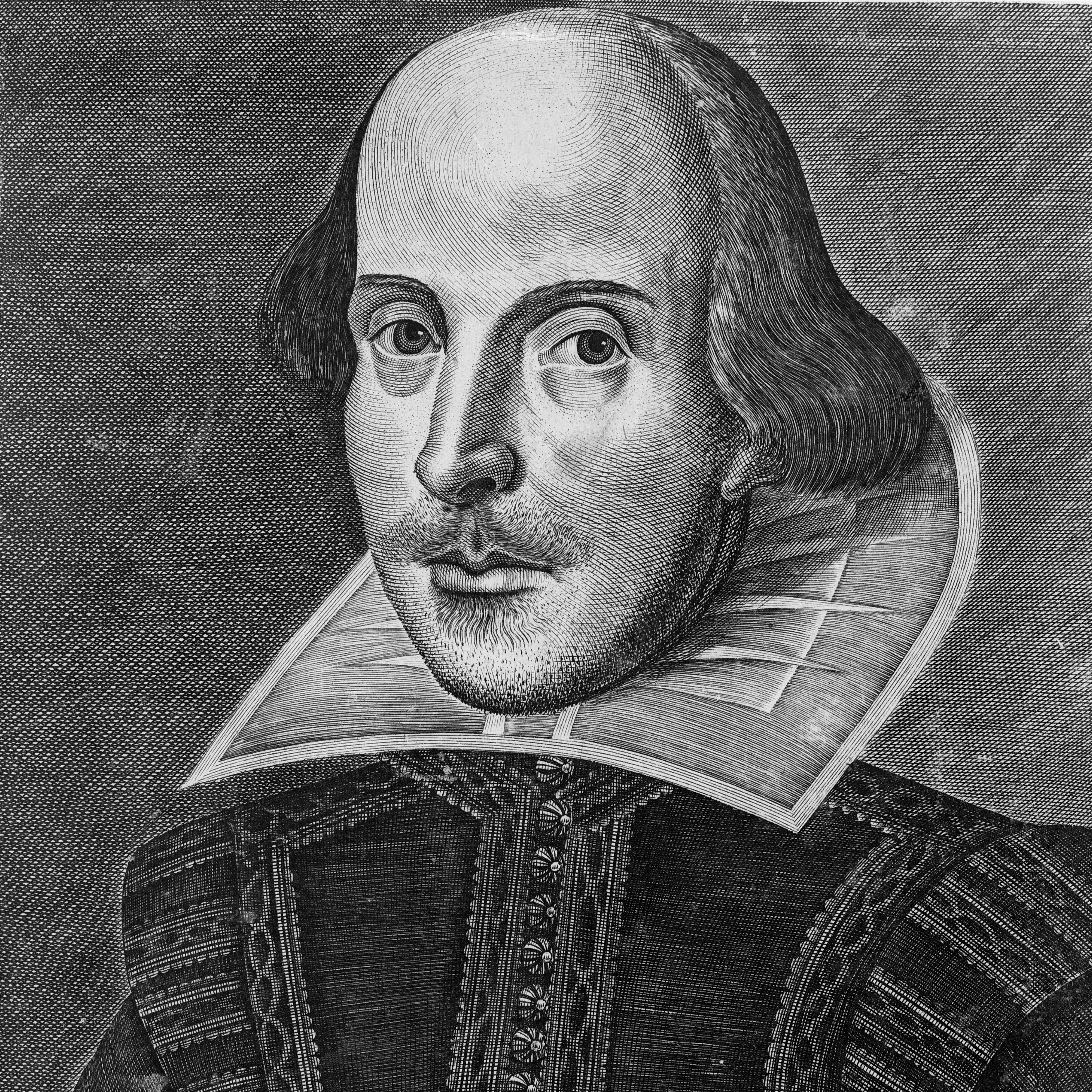
William Shakespeare was familiar with the Forest of Arden and set drama there, most notably As You Like It.

=== Shakespeare ===
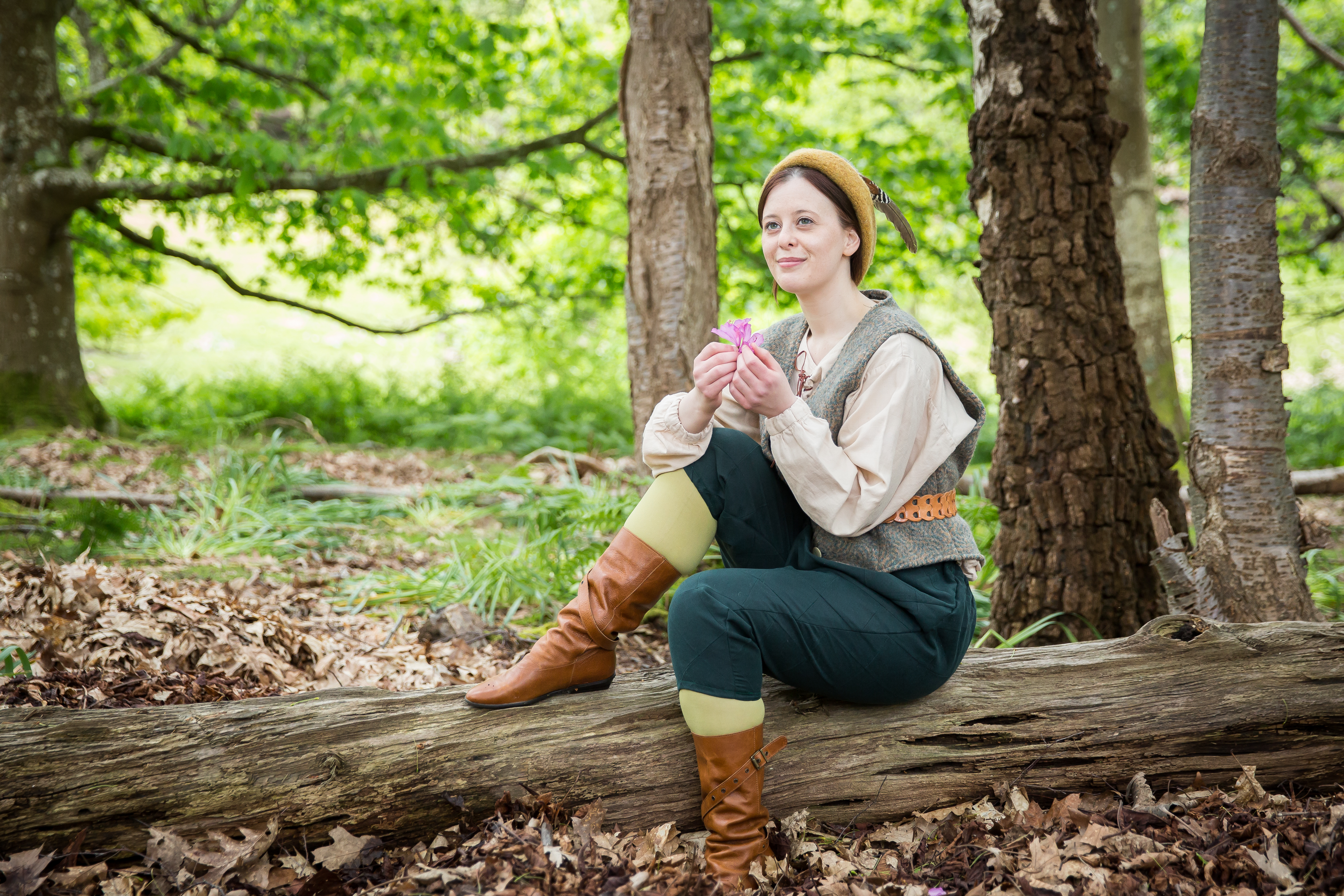
Marie Davey as Rosalind in As You Like It 2017

Shakespeare's play As You Like It is set in the Forest of Arden, but it is an imaginary version incorporating elements from the Ardennes forest in Thomas Lodge's prose romance Rosalynde; Or, Euphues' Golden Legacy and the real forest (both as it was when the play was written, i.e. subjected to deforestation and enclosure, and the romanticized version of his youth). Lodge was familiar with the English Forest of Arden via the ownership and occupation by the family of the manor Soulton by his father, Sir Thomas Lodge.

This manor is located on the boundaries of the English Forest of Arden in a territory in which the Tudor Statesman Sir Rowland Hill was active, furnishing a possible inspiration for Shakespeare's character Old Sir Rowland.

Shakespeare's Arden seems to have promulgated a vision of the forest that fits in with the English nostalgic autostereotype of Merry England, and inspired subsequent artists such as Pre-Raphaelite John Collier.

=== Myths and legends ===
The status of Coventry as an isolated settlement surrounded by the thick Forest of Arden has been cited by some historians as a cause for the prospering of a cult of the pagan goddess Cofa after the rest of the country had been Christianised.

It is believed that in the 12th century, this localised cult had transferred its veneration from the goddess Cofa to Lady Godiva, an Anglo Saxon Countess of the area. The warping of the myths with the real historical figure of Godiva, could explain many of the legends associated with her.

According to the legend, the hero Sir Guy of Warwick set up his hermitage at Guy's Cliffe in the Forest of Arden, overlooking the River Avon.

=== In other fiction ===
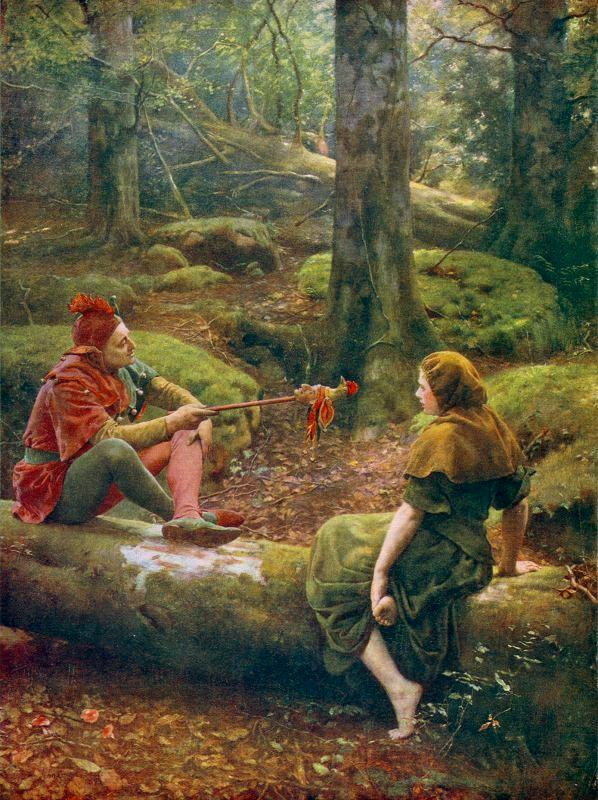
John Collier – In the Forest of Arden

Moseley Bog is a remnant of the Forest of Arden, now a local nature reserve that inspired the Old Forest in J. R. R. Tolkien's The Lord of the Rings books.

=== Court offices ===
In 1758 the Earl of Aylesford and five others founded (or possibly re-founded) the Woodmen of Arden. This is an exclusive archery club that takes its offices from the medieval Royal Forest court positions, such as Verderer and Warden.

The organisation claims to be a successor to an older organisation of woodmen, however there is scant evidence that forest law ever applied in the Forest of Arden.

== Forest law ==
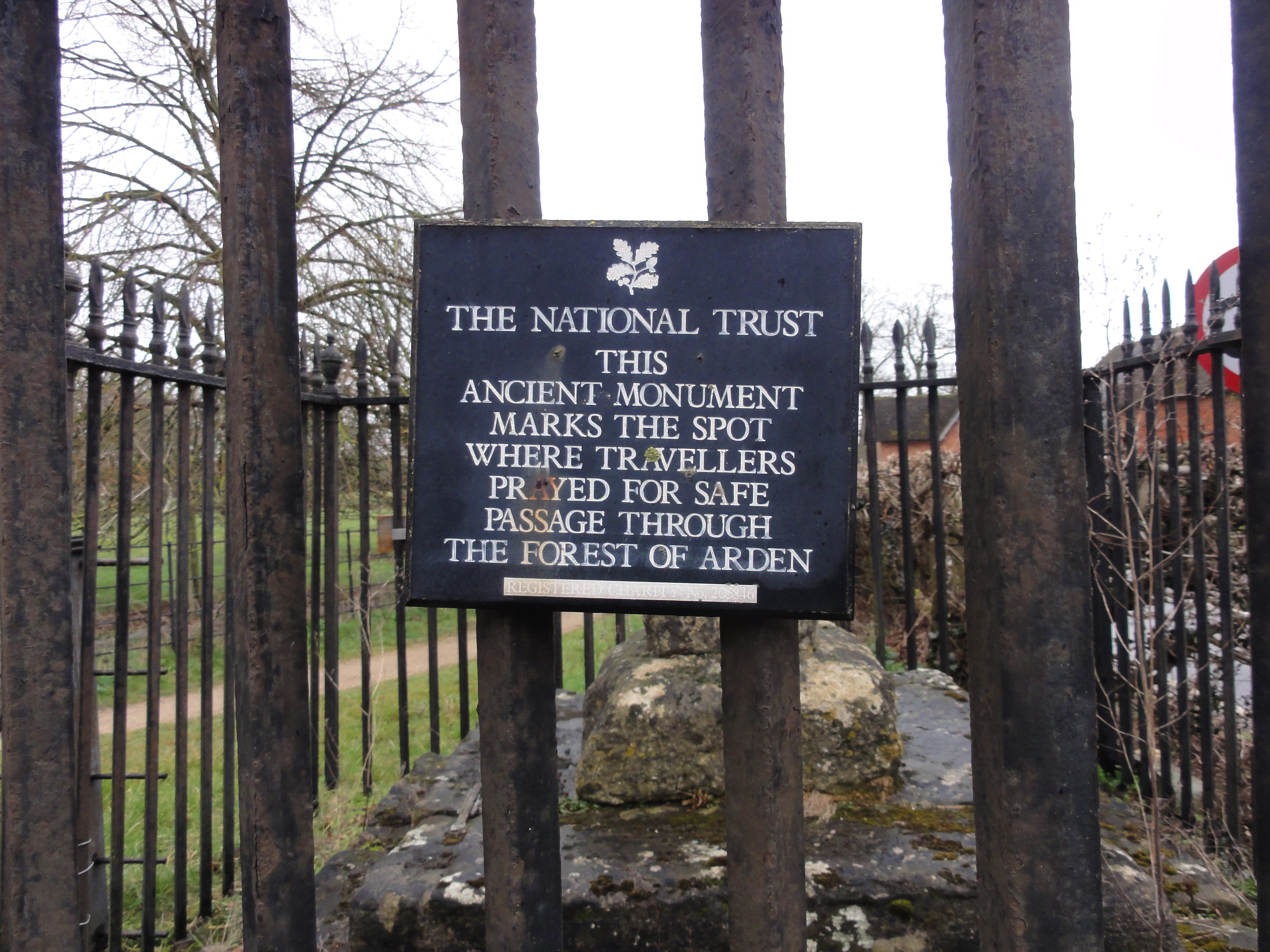
Remains of Wayside Cross Marking South Western Corner of the Forest of Arden

Unlike other forests of the era it does not appear that the Forest of Arden was ever subject to forest law. It is unclear why this is, however it is possibly because wide-scale settlement of the area did not occur until comparatively late, and thus the forest still represented something of a frontier.

This may have been due to the density and size of the forest – which overlies a large area of clay resulting in natural vegetation of dense broad-leaved woodland like oak and lime – as well as the dangers within such as bears and wolves, which did not become extinct in Great Britain until the sixth and seventeenth centuries respectively. No Roman road penetrated the forest; Icknield Street, Watling Street, and Fosse Way all went around it instead, and a salt track bounded the south side.

The Domesday book indicates that the area was still little settled by 1086, with a handful of former Iron Age hill forts, Roman forts, and Anglo-Saxon settlements at places like Henley-in-Arden, Coleshill and Ulverlei. A medieval era wayside cross known as the Coughton Cross sits at the southern boundary of the forest, and was allegedly a site where travelers would pray for safe passage through the forest prior to entering.

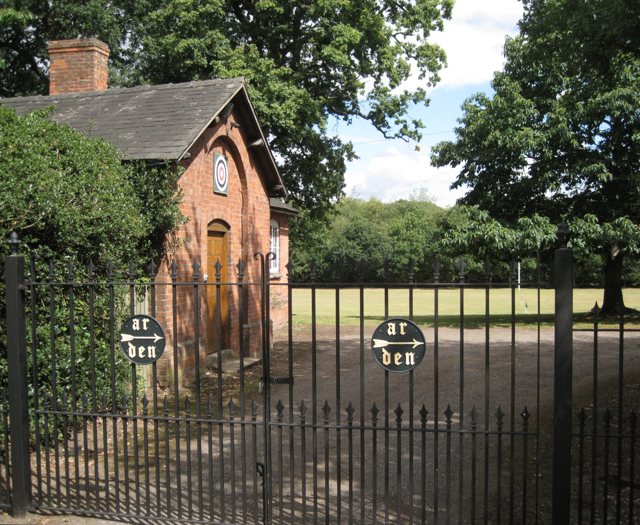
Forest Hall of the Woodmen of Arden

The first major wave of settlement of assarts occurred from the eleventh century to the fourteenth century, as a result of "peasant land hunger" from settlements south of Arden and "seignorial encouragement" and lords desiring to expand their holdings and political power. Even so, settlers had to be enticed to colonise the area. In the planted borough of Solihull the Lord of the Manor offered free burgage tenure in which residents were free, rent-paying burgesses, rather than villeins owing service to the Lord of the Manor. In Tanworth in Arden the Earl of Warwick pursued a policy as overlord that unusually saw over 60 per cent of the income from this manor derived from free rents.

Royal forests subject to forest law were established on wooded land adjoining the Forest of Arden, at Sutton Park in the Anglo-Saxon era, and Feckenham Forest in the early Norman era, both much smaller and more manageable than the vast untamed land of Arden.

Despite the lack of evidence that the Forest of Arden was ever under forest law, the Woodmen of Arden, founded (or refounded) in 1758, claim to be a revival of a body who traditionally exercised the role of crown forestry officials in the area.

== Geography ==
The area is punctuated by a large number of settlements – such as Bearley, Shirley and Henley – ending with 'ley', meaning 'a clearing'. There are also a large number of areas with references to woodland, such as Kingswood, Nuthurst, Packwood, Hollywood, Earlswood, Four Oaks, and so on.

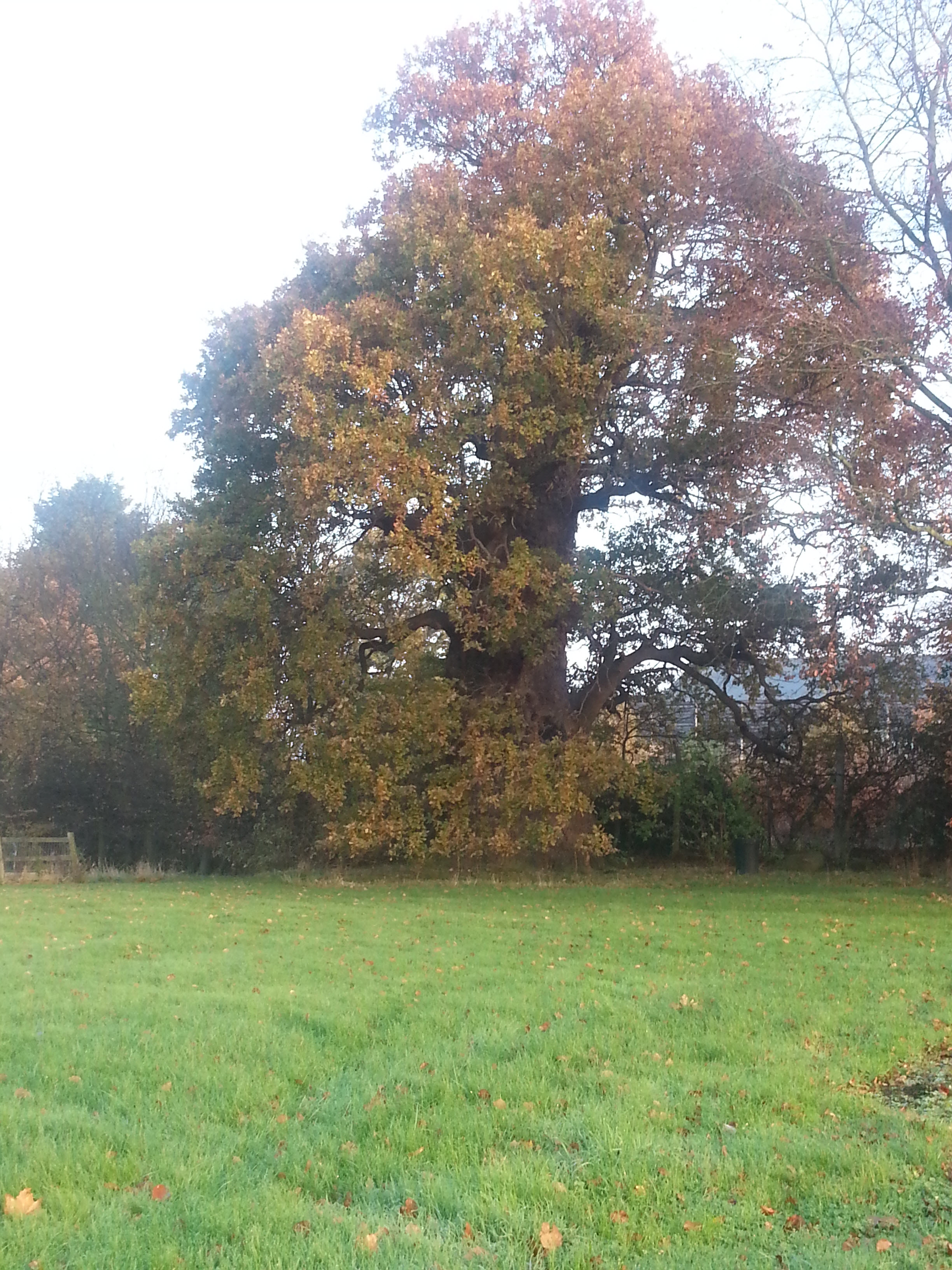
1000 year old oak tree in the grounds of Stoneleigh Abbey

It is not known exactly when deforestation began, but even in the 16th century it was understood that the forest of Arden had been diminished from what it had been due to enclosure and later logging, due amongst other things to the demands of the navy for wood.

The forest itself is today mostly reduced to individual oaks, hedgerows and occasional pockets of ancient woodland, such as the former Royal Forest of Sutton Park and Rough Wood. Ecologist Steven Falk, undertaking research with Warwickshire County Council, conducted a survey of the oldest trees in the Arden area and found over 500 examples of ancient Quercus robur (common oak), including examples exceeding 1000 years old. The oldest trees are believed to be in Ryton Woods where Tilia cordata (small-leaved lime) has been coppiced for so long that individual coppice stools have become difficult to distinguish from clustered ones. Falk estimates these trees are well over 1000 years old.

The fauna is typical for the wider area, however before emparkment would have included traditional game species such as wild deer, boar and White Park cattle. Many species of deer still roam the region, however the cattle have long since been lost to emparkment. Wild boar were extinct in Great Britain in the 17th century, however they were accidentally reintroduced in the 1970s and sightings have been made in the Arden area.

A number of rivers run through the Arden area including the River Cole and the River Blythe.

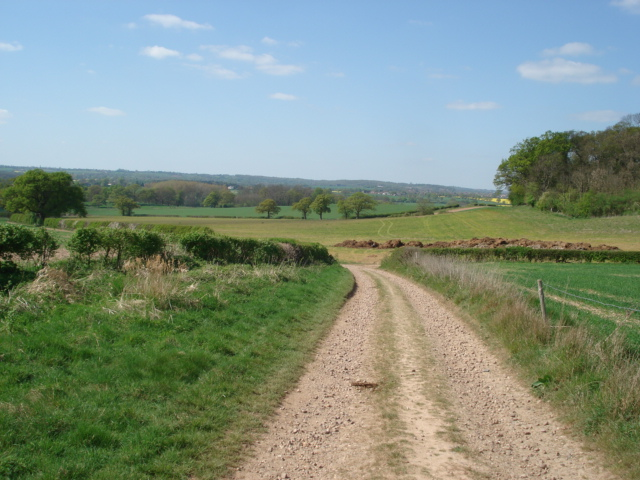
The Arden Way at Windmill Hill – A rural path tracking old paths through the forest – Demonstrating the modern agricultural nature of the area

Given the history and natural geography of the area, tourism supports some of the local economy. Towns in the area include Hampton-in-Arden, Henley-in-Arden, and Tanworth-in-Arden. The name 'Arden' is used prominently across the region, such as Arden Academy and the Forest of Arden Hotel and Country Club.

The Arden Way is a waymarked UK National Trail that traces old paths and routes through rural areas of the ancient Forest of Arden.

== Government protections ==
The Stratford-on-Avon District allocated the Arden area within its borders as a Special Landscape Area in 1996.

Although the Arden area itself is not recognized as an Area of Outstanding Natural Beauty, it borders the Cannock Chase AONB to the north, and Cotswolds AONB to the south.

== Arden Sandstone ==
Maxstoke Castle

Arden Sandstone is a distinctive Triassic white heterolithic sandstone quarried from the Arden area and used in local buildings. The sandstone contains a large amount of calcium carbonate ('lime') originating from the shells of creatures that lived in the water in which the sandstone formed, which over time develops a reddish hue due to a type of algae (Trentepohlia jolithus) that grows only on such lime-bearing stone.

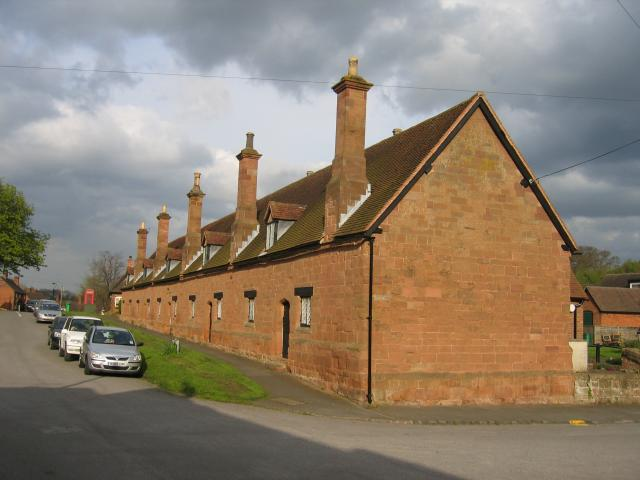
The Almshouses at Stoneleigh – A typical Arden village

The stone varies in colour from a muddy brown-red to a brighter orange or red ochre depending on factors such as how long it has been exposed. It is a common building material across the Arden area, and many prominent and famous buildings use it, such as Kenilworth Castle, Maxstoke Castle, St Alphege Church, St Michael's Cathedral, St Mary's Guildhall, Stoneleigh Abbey Gatehouse, and numerous others.

The stone features prominently in villages across Arden, such as Temple Balsall and Knowle.

== Forest restoration and rewilding ==
Deforestation and emparkment has reduced the woodland cover, but it should be kept in mind that "forest" meant a legal and governance territory before it connoted tree cover as it does to modern ears.

The area remains largely rural, and pockets of trees, a few ancient woodlands, field boundaries and ancient oaks remain as the heritage of the once much larger forest.

Most of the trees and woodland that made up the forest and still remain are today protected, and there are a number of listed buildings across the area, noted for their history. Many of the buildings are operated by the National Trust and can be visited by tourists.

=== Heart of England Forest ===
Publisher Felix Dennis planted substantial areas of woodland in the area. He created a charity, the Heart of England Forest, to carry on this work. On his death in 2014 he left most of his fortune to be used for this purpose. 3,000 acres (12.1 km^{2}) have been planted in Spernall, Dorsington and Honeybourne, and at the Lenches in Worcestershire.

=== Arden Forest scheme ===
In 2021 it was announced that a new 'Arden Forest' scheme was being established in the borough of Solihull, to create a continuous wildlife corridor across the region, in an effort to restore and rewild some of the forest. The aim is part of a wider project seeking to plant a quarter of a million trees within ten years across the area.

=== National forest proposal ===
The Countryside Commission considered creating a new national forest in the area in 1989, but the proposal was not taken up. A Community Forest was established in the 1990s to the north of the forest of Arden called the Forest of Mercia, and a national forest has since been established between Leicester and Swadlincote in the East Midlands, however.

== See also ==
- Hampton-in-Arden
- Henley-in-Arden
- Tanworth-in-Arden
- Arden family
- Woodmen of Arden
- Arden University
