= Target archery =

Most popular form of archery in which participants shoot at colored targets

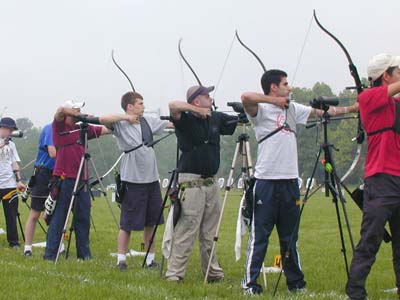
An archery competition.

Target archery is the most popular form of archery, in which members shoot at stationary circular targets at varying distances. All types of bow – longbow, barebow, recurve and compound – can be used. In Great Britain, imperial rounds, measured in yards, are still used for many tournaments and these have slightly different rules to metric (WA) rounds, which are used internationally. Archers are divided into age groups and by type of bow.

Modern competitive target archery is governed by the World Archery Federation (abbreviated WA), formerly FITA – Fédération Internationale de Tir à l'Arc. WA is the International Olympic Committee's (IOC) recognized governing body for all of archery and Olympic rules are derived from the WA rules.

Currently 142 nations are represented by WA archery governing bodies. The largest of these are the FFTA (French archery federation) with approximately 60,000 members, FITARCO (Italian federation), DSB (German Shooting Sport and Archery Federation), All-Japan Archery Federation, and ArcheryGB formerly known as Grand National Archery Society (GNAS) of Great Britain, with approximately 40,000 members. In the United States the WA affiliated governing body is USA Archery, with approximately 25,000 members, which dates to the 1870s, making it the third oldest archery governing body after GNAS and FITARCO, which date to the 1860s.

== Rules ==
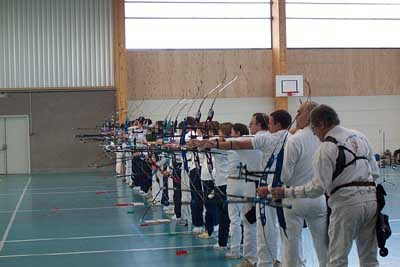
An indoor archery competition.

Archery competitions may be held indoors or outdoors. Indoor rounds are normally shot at one distance, whereas in years past outdoor competitions normally consisted of several distances. Recently World Archery has determined that only one distance is needed for outdoor competitions. Since archery involves the use of potentially lethal equipment, much attention is paid to order and safety. Whistle commands are used to signal the different phases of shooting, or an 'end'. Two whistle blasts means archers can approach the shooting line. One whistle blast means archers can begin shooting. The archers are not allowed to collect their arrows whilst other archers are shooting. The signal to collect your arrows is three whistles from the field captain or a judge. These rules apply to all forms of target archery. Other rules, or points of etiquette, include:

- The command Fast means stop shooting immediately and return the unshot arrow to the quiver. It is used when the situation becomes suddenly and unexpectedly dangerous. Another way to show that the situation has become dangerous is when a judge blows more than 3 whistles.
- Do not distract another archer when they are shooting. If an archer is at full draw, wait before taking your place on the shooting line or wait until they release their arrow before departing the line.
- If an archer damages another archer's arrows (or other equipment), they must offer to pay for any damages.

=== Equipment types ===
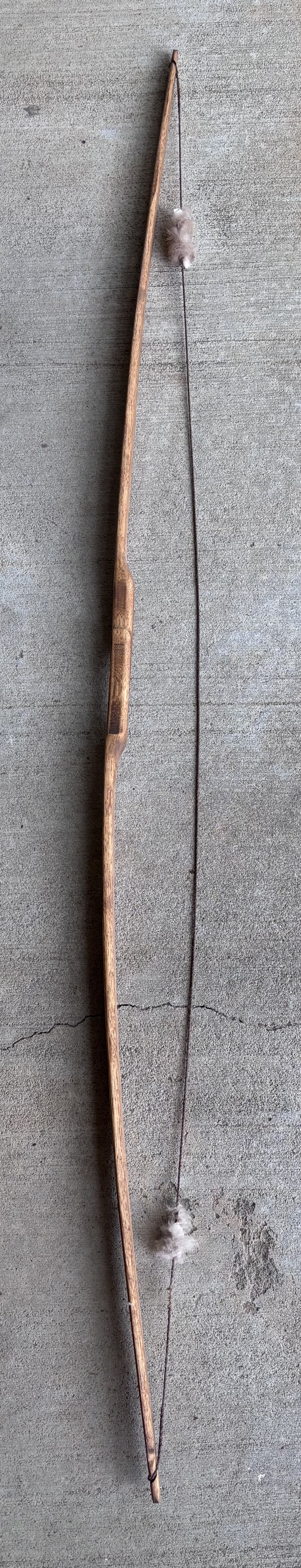
Long bow

The allowed equipment for Target Archery are Recurve, Compound, Barebow, Longbow (American & English) and Traditional. Recurve uses a sight, dampener (long stick that is in front of and attached to bow), stabilizers (smaller sticks on either side of archer), weights at the ends of the dampener and stabilizers, arrow rest and a plunger (a spring that pushes the arrow away from the bow). A Compound bow uses a sight, weights, dampener, a single stabilizer and an arrow rest. Barebow uses the bow, weights and arrow rest and can usually be taken apart. The difference between that and a longbow is that typically longbows cannot be taken apart and do not use any equipment that can be attached to the bow.

Arrow selections vary depending upon the type of bow that is used and what division someone is competing in. Wood arrows are usually used with Longbows and Barebows. Carbon Fiber arrows are used with Barebow, Compound and Recurve. Aluminum arrows are usually used by beginners or as a core to Carbon arrows at the higher levels of competition.

Standard personal equipment would be a quiver (to put arrows in), some sort of release aid (mechanical or finger), arrow puller and if someone wants to practice at home instead of at a range then they would need their own target butt (as seen in the picture with the Barebow on the right) and these come in many sizes and types.

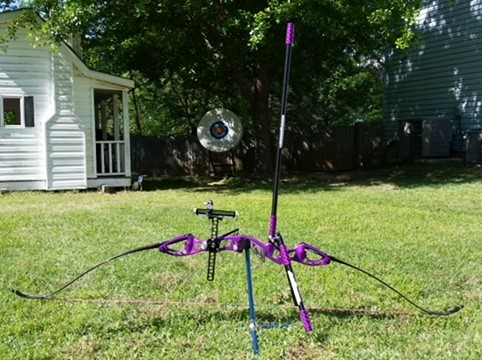
Recurve bow with Olympic setup

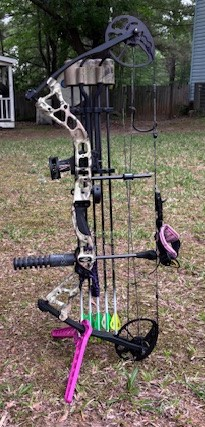
Compound bow with Hunter setup

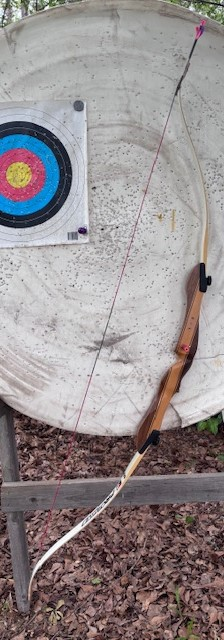
Barebow

=== Classifications ===
Competition is broken up by the age of the archer. Each equipment type has the same class as seen below. The "Under" categories may compete in the next age group up but must do so for the entire indoor and outdoor season since points are awarded each competition season (each year) therefore going back and forth between classes isn't allowed so that points are fairly awarded.

*Under 15 Women and Under 15 Men

*Under 18 Women and Under 18 Men

*Under 21 Women and Under 21 Men

*Women and Men (21 and older)

*50+ Women and 50+ Men

*Para-Archery (which has its own breakdown based upon disability)

== Scoring ==
An official WA target

Standard WA targets are marked with 10 evenly spaced concentric rings, which generally have score values from 1 through 10 assigned to them, except in outdoor Imperial rounds under AGB rules, where they have score values 1, 3, 5, 7 and 9. In addition, there is an inner 10 ring, sometimes called the X ring. This becomes the 10 ring at indoor compound competitions. Outdoors, it serves as a tiebreaker with the archer scoring the most X's winning. The number of hits may also be taken into account as another tiebreaker. In World Archery, targets are coloured as follows:

- 1 ring & 2 ring – white
- 3 ring & 4 ring – black
- 5 ring & 6 ring – blue
- 7 ring & 8 ring – red
- 9 ring, 10 ring & inner 10 ring – gold

The inner ring is usually used for tie-breaking (the competitor closest to the X is the winner)

Archers score each end by summing the scores for their arrows. An arrow just touching a scoring boundary line, known as a Line Breaker or Line Cutter, is awarded the higher score. Values scored by each arrow are recorded on a score sheet and must be written in descending order (e.g. if an archer scores 5, 7, 6, 10, 9, 8, this must be recorded as 10, 9, 8, 7, 6, 5). During and before scoring no one is allowed to touch the arrows. This is so that if there is disputed arrow score then a judge may be called and the judge makes a ruling on how the arrow lies. The archer in charge of scoring on a target at a tournament is known as the ''Target Captain'' and in larger tournaments, they may be assisted by a ''Target Lieutenant''; a Target Captain makes an initial judgment on all disputed arrows. Under WA rules, in major tournaments, after scoring, each hole is marked before arrows are retrieved. In the event of a "pass through" (the arrow passes straight through the target) or "bouncer" (arrow hits the target and bounces out), points may be awarded to an unmarked hole. Under AGB rules, and in some smaller tournaments, in the case of a bouncer, the archer must step off the shooting line and hold their bow in the air. A judge then decides whether the archer is permitted to shoot a replacement arrow. If an archer accidentally shoots more arrows than allowed, the highest scoring arrow is not counted and a miss is recorded.

=== Target faces ===
Different rounds and distances use different size target faces. Each country has their way of doing competitions and many have multiple formats that they use on a regular basis within and across clubs. Standard sizes used across all countries are:

40 cm (16 in) (18 m [20 yd])

60 cm (24 in) (18 m [20 yd])

80 cm (31 in) (30 and 50 m [33 and 55 yd])

122 cm (48 in) (70 and 90 m [77 and 98 yd])

The 40 centimeter face is made up of 5 colors and each color is split into two different values The innermost value is the 10 ring (10 Points) and the outermost is worth 1 point. The colors with their values from outer to inner are: White (1 or 2 points), Black (3 or 4 points), Blue (5 or 6 points), Red (7 or 8 Points and Yellow (9 or 10 Points). The 60, 80 and 122 centimeter faces are made up with the same colors, however the width of each section is larger.

A variant of the 80-centimetre (31 in) face, called a "Spot" may be used when competing indoor. This variant shows only the inner 6 rings of a full 80-centimetre (31 in) face. There are also versions of the 40-and-60-centimetre (16 and 24 in) targets known as the "3 Spot". These targets contain 3 instances of the inner 5 rings of the 40-and-60-centimetre (16 and 24 in) faces arranged in a line or an equilateral triangle. This is to stop competitors from damaging their own arrows by shooting a "robin hood". The 122 centimeter (48 in) faces are used in Olympic competition which are held outdoor at a single distance.

== Tournament rounds ==
Distances are measured using Imperial rounds (measured in yards) and are mainly shot in the United Kingdom and with NFAA and Metric rounds, (measured in meters), are used for most other tournaments. The metered rounds are the main rounds that are able to be shot in target archery.

=== Imperial rounds ===
These rounds use 5-zone scoring, as opposed to the usual 10-zone scoring. The points are awarded as follows: 9 for a gold, 7 for a red, 5 for a blue, 3 for a black and 1 for a white. Arrows are shot at increasingly closer distances - for example, in a York round, an archer shoots six dozen at 100 yards (91 m), followed by four dozen at 80 yards (73 m), followed by two dozen at 60 yards (55 m). Senior rounds are for archers aged 18 and over and junior rounds are for archers under the age of 18.

=== Metric rounds ===
These rounds use standard 5-colour, 10-zone scoring. For outdoor rounds, arrows are either shot at increasingly closer distances or at a single distance, typically 70 m or 77 yds - for example, in a Mens 1440 round, an archer shoots three dozen at 90 m (98 yards), followed by three dozen at 70 m (77 yards), then three dozen at 50 m (55 yards), then three dozen at 30 m (33 yards). The furthest two distances are shot on a 122-centimetre (48 in) face target; the nearer two on an 80-centimetre (31 in) face target.

=== Field rounds ===
Field rounds are used in the United States under the National Field Archery Association in the United States. Depending on the type of round during these competitions the target face is either the 5-color target face, a blue and white face, a black and white face, a paper animal face or a 3D Animal. The blue & white and black & white faces score from 1-5 and are the same measurements as the 5-color face.

== Olympics ==
Pictogram for Archery at the Summer Olympics

Archery was in the Olympics (and the 1906 Intercalated Games) between 1900, the second modern Olympics, and 1920. The sport was dropped from the program because there were no internationally recognized rules for the sport- each Olympics through 1920 held a different type of event. With the creation of FITA in the 1930s, set international rules were created. However, it was not until 1972 that Archery was re-introduced with the individual event, and in 1988 the team event was added to the program. Further competition rules changes were made for the 1992 Olympic Games, which introduced match play to the program in the form of the Archery Olympic Round.

The only type of bow allowed to be used at Olympic level is the recurve bow. Since the 1984 Games at Los Angeles, South Korea has dominated the women's event. At the Sydney 2000 games, the Korean women won bronze, silver and gold in the individual competition and won gold in the team event. They also won the gold team medal in the 2004 Athens games, the 2008 Beijing games, and the 2012 London games.

== See also ==
- World Archery Championships
- Field Archery
- Clout Archery
- History of Archery
- Arrow
- Bow
- Archery
- Shooting sports
- Crossbow
- Modern competitive archery

=== External links ===
- Archery GB Rules of Shooting
- GB Archery: Outdoor Classifications & Handicaps
- GB Archery: Indoor Classifications & Handicaps
- World Archery Rulebook
- NFAA Rules
