= Arden Way =

Long-distance footpath in Warwickshire, England

Coordinates: 52.2938°N 1.7796°W

- Length: 42 km (26 mi)
- Location: England
- Designation: UK National Trail
- Trailheads: Henley-in-Arden, Warwickshire
- Use: Hiking

The Arden Way is waymarked by the Heart of England Way Association and forms a circular path intended to be walked along with the rest of Heart of England Way and the European route E2. The route travels along old paths, through the Forest of Arden, Warwickshire.
