= History of archery =

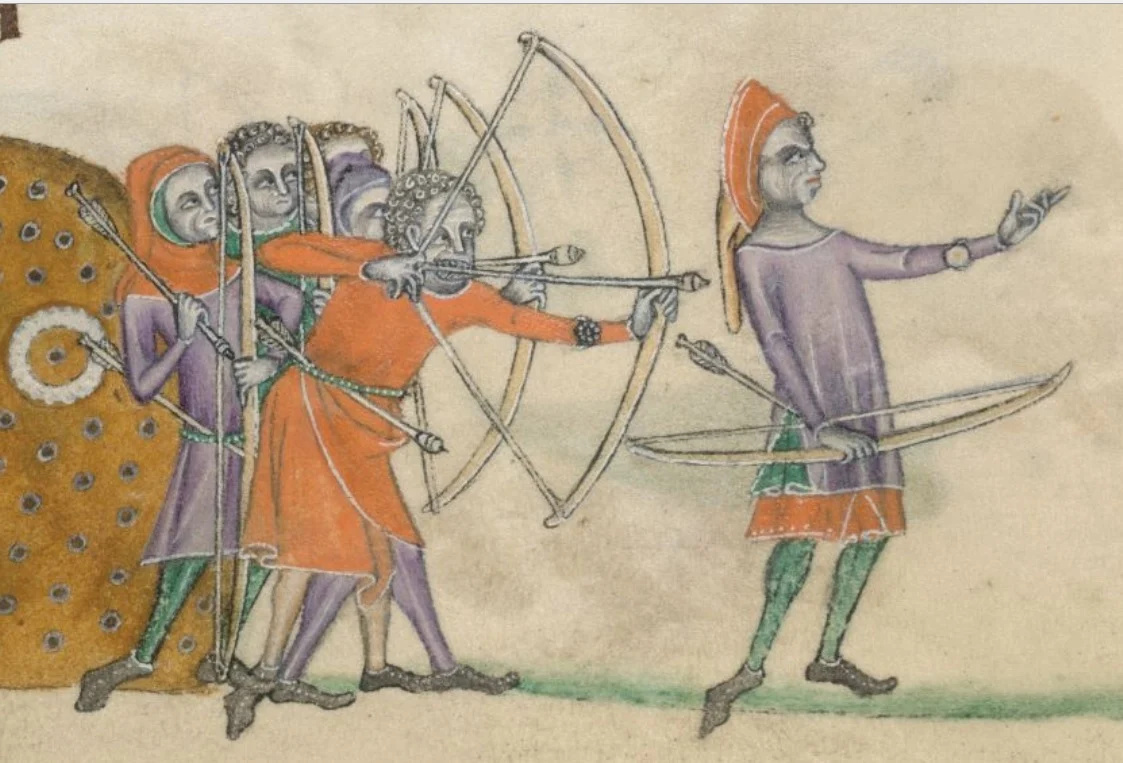
Longbowmen archers of the Middle Ages.

Archery, or the use of bow and arrows, was probably developed in Africa by the later Middle Stone Age (approx. 70,000 years ago). It is documented as part of warfare and hunting from the classical period (where it figures in the mythologies of many cultures) until the end of the 19th century, when bow and arrows was made functionally obsolete by the invention and spread of repeating firearms (though they are still used in hunting).

Archers were a widespread if supplemental part of the military in the classical period, and bowmen fought on foot, in chariots or mounted on horses. Archery rose to prominence in Europe in the later medieval period, where victories such as the Battle of Agincourt cemented the longbow in military lore.

Archery in both hunting and warfare was eventually replaced by firearms in Europe in the Late Middle Ages and early modern period. Firearms eventually diffused throughout Eurasia via the Gunpowder empires, gradually reducing the importance of archery in warfare throughout the world.

Archery is still practiced today, for hunting and as a target sport.

== Prehistory ==
=== Paleolithic and Epipaleolithic ===
The oldest known evidence of arrows comes from layers 20–21 in Obi-Rakhmat Grotto, Uzbekistan, some 80,000 years ago. It consists of bladelets and micro-points, which may have been hafted to arrow shafts using locally-available bitumen. Traces of impact fractures, consistent with their use as projectile points, were identified in the micro-points. All are too large for blowgun darts. Larger Levallois points, probable spearheads, were also found. The people who made these points are unknown; fragments of a single juvenile hominid skull in layer 16 of the Grotto were deposited some ten thousand years later.

In the South African Sibudu Cave, likely arrowheads have been found, dating from approximately 72,000–60,000 years ago, on some of which poisons may have been used.

Small stone points from the Mandrin Cave in Southern France, used some 54,000 years ago, have damage from use that indicates their use as projectile weapons, and some are too small (less than 10mm across as the base) for any practical use other than as arrowheads. They are associated with possibly the first groups of humans to leave Africa.

Likely arrowheads were reported in 2020 from Fa Hien Cave in Sri Lanka, dated to 48,000 years ago. "Bow-and-arrow hunting at the Sri Lankan site likely focused on monkeys and smaller animals, such as squirrels... Remains of these creatures were found in the same sediment as the bone points."

At the site of Nataruk in Turkana County, Kenya, obsidian bladelets found embedded in a human skull and within the thoracic cavity of another human skeleton, suggest the use of stone-tipped arrows as weapons about 10,000 years ago.

In the Sahara, Mesolithic rock art of the Tassili plateau from 5,000 BP or earlier depicts people carrying bows.

Based on indirect evidence, the bow seems also to have appeared or reappeared later in Eurasia around the Upper Paleolithic.

In the Levant, artifacts which may be arrow-shaft straighteners are known from the Natufian culture, (ca. 12,800–10,300 BP) onwards. The Khiamian and PPN A shouldered Khiam-points may well be arrowheads.

Possible fragments of a bow found at Mannheim-Vogelstang have been dated to the Early Magdelenian age (c. 17,500 to 18,000 years ago) and at Stellmoor dated 11,000 years ago. Azilian points found in Grotte du Bichon, Switzerland, alongside the remains of both a bear and a hunter, with flint fragments found in the bear's third vertebra, suggest the use of arrows at 13,500 years ago.

Other early indications of archery in Europe come from Stellmoor in the Ahrensburg valley north of Hamburg, Germany. They were associated with artifacts of the late Paleolithic (11,000–9,000 BP). The arrows were made of pine and consisted of a mainshaft and a 15–20 centimetre (6–8 inches) long foreshaft with a flint point. They had shallow grooves on the base, indicating that they were shot from a bow.

The oldest definite bows known so far come from the Holmegaard swamp in Denmark. In the 1940s, two bows were found there, dated to about 8,000 BP. The Holmegaard bows are made of elm and have flat arms and a D-shaped midsection. The center section is biconvex. The complete bow is 1.50 m (5 ft) long. Bows of Holmegaard-type were in use until the Bronze Age; the convexity of the midsection has decreased with time.

Mesolithic pointed shafts have been found in England, Germany, Denmark, and Sweden. They were often rather long, up to 120 cm (4 ft) and made of European hazel (Corylus avellana), wayfaring tree (Viburnum lantana) and other small woody shoots. Some still have flint arrow-heads preserved; others have blunt wooden ends for hunting birds and small game. The ends show traces of fletching, which was fastened on with birch-tar.

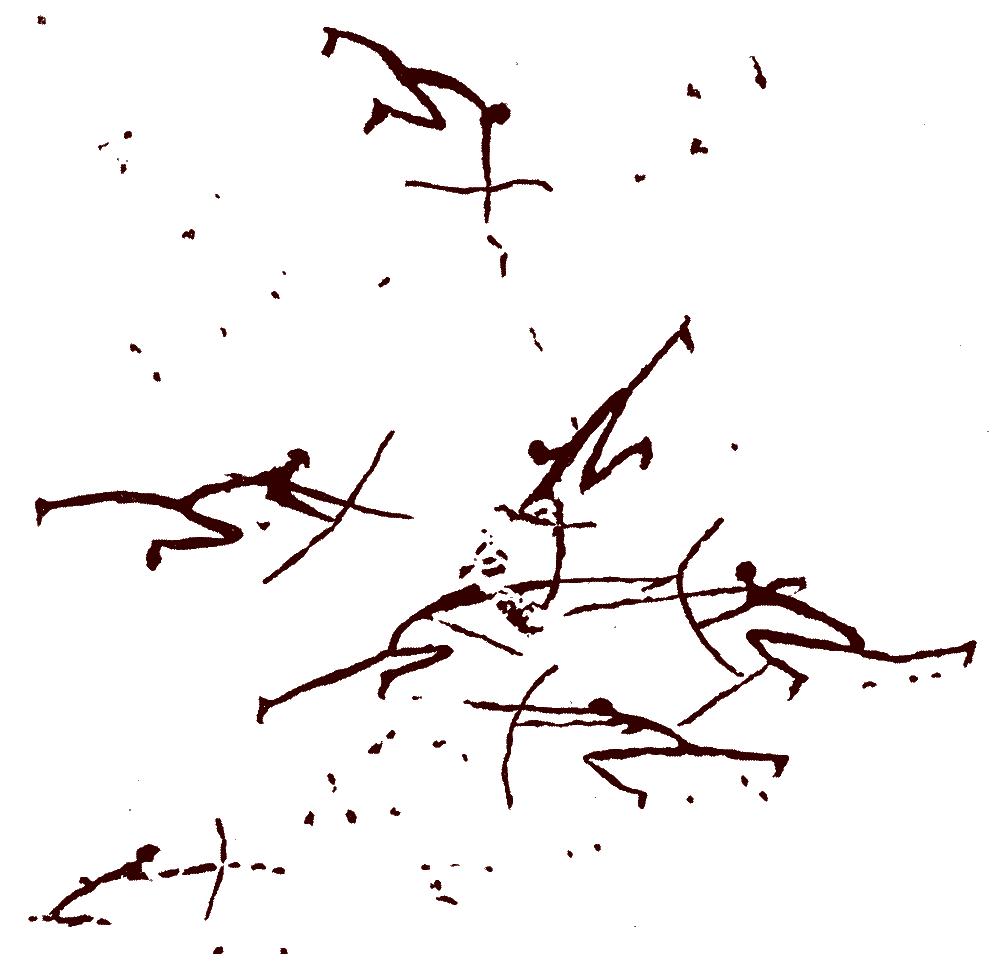
Cave painting of a battle between archers, Morella la Vella, Valencia, Spain

The oldest depictions of combat, found in Iberian cave art of the Mesolithic, show battles between archers. A group of three archers encircled by a group of four is found in Cueva del Roure, Morella la Vella, Castellón, Valencia. A depiction of a larger battle (which may, however, date to the early Neolithic), in which eleven archers are attacked by seventeen running archers, is found in Les Dogue, Ares del Maestrat, Castellón, Valencia. At Val del Charco del Agua Amarga, Alcañiz, Aragon, seven archers with plumes on their heads are fleeing a group of eight archers running in pursuit.

Archery seems to have arrived in the Americas via Alaska, as early as 6000 BC, with the Arctic small tool tradition, about 2500 BC, spreading south into the temperate zones as early as 2000 BC, and was widely known among the indigenous peoples of North America from about 500 AD.

=== Neolithic ===
The oldest Neolithic bow known from Europe was found in anaerobic layers dating between 7,400 and 7,200 BP, the earliest layer of settlement at the lake settlement at La Draga, Banyoles, Girona, Spain. The intact specimen is short at 1.08 m (3 ft 7 in), has a D-shaped cross-section, and is made of yew wood. Stone wrist-guards, interpreted as display versions of bracers, form a defining part of the Beaker culture and arrowheads are also commonly found in Beaker graves. European Neolithic fortifications, arrow-heads, injuries, and representations indicate that, in Neolithic and Early Bronze Age Europe, archery was a major form of interpersonal violence. For example, the Neolithic settlement at Carn Brea was occupied between around 3700 and 3400 BC; excavations found that every timber structure on the site had been burnt, and there was a concentration of arrow heads around a probable entrance to the enclosure, suggesting that these arrows may have been used by a large group of archers in an organized assault.

=== Bronze Age ===
Chariot-borne archers became a defining feature of Middle Bronze Age warfare, from Europe to Eastern Asia and India. However, in the Middle Bronze Age, with the development of massed infantry tactics, and with the use of chariots for shock tactics or as prestigious command vehicles, archery seems to have lessened in importance in European warfare. In approximately the same period, with the Seima-Turbino Phenomenon and the spread of the Andronovo culture, mounted archery became a defining feature of Eurasian nomad cultures and a foundation of their military success, until the massed use of guns.

== Ancient history ==
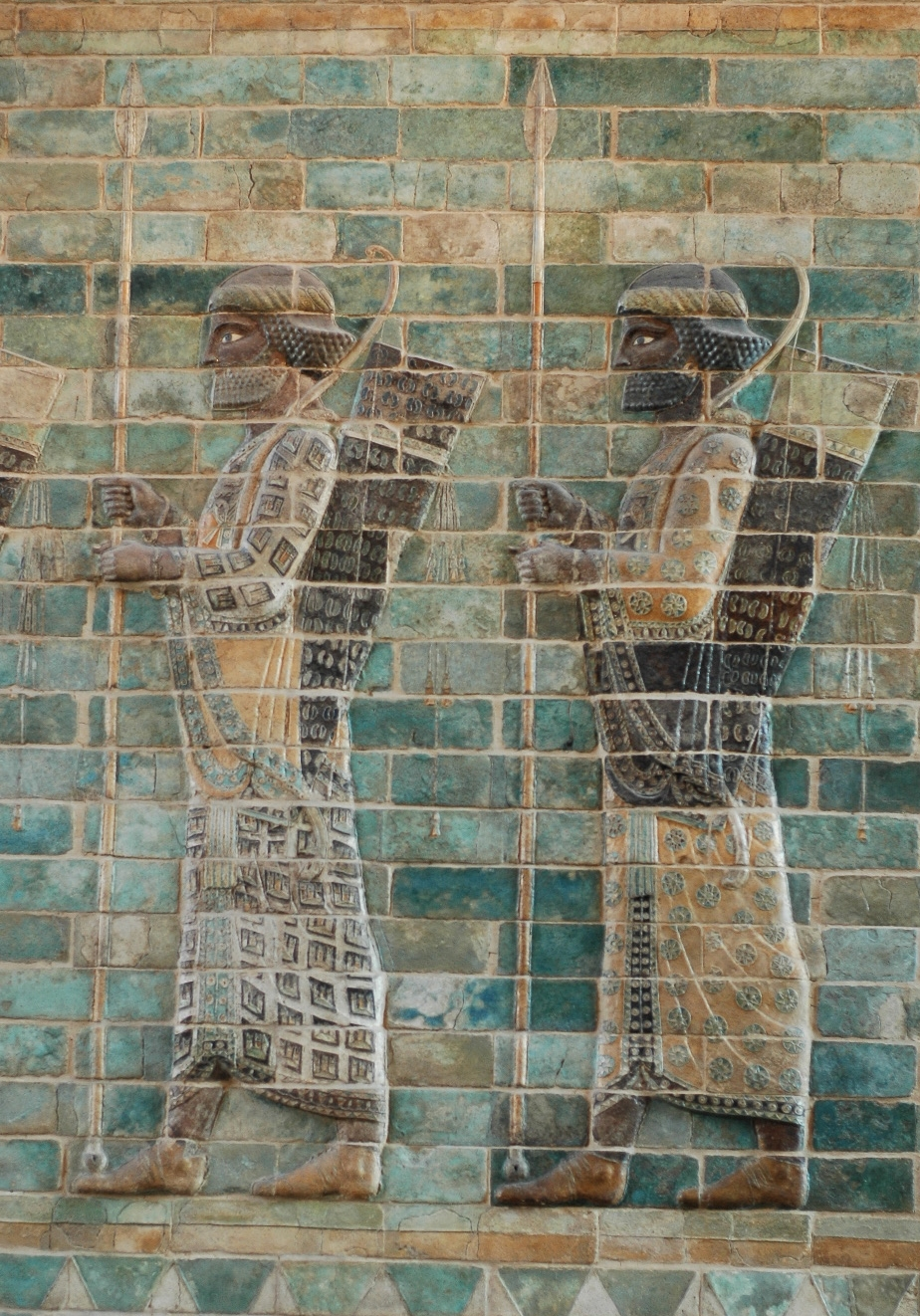
Archers with recurve bows and short spears, detail from the archers' frieze in Palace of Darius I in Susa. Siliceous glazed bricks, c. 510 BC.

Ancient civilizations, notably the Persians, Parthians, Egyptians, Nubians, Indians, Koreans, Chinese, and Japanese fielded large numbers of archers in their armies. Arrows were destructive against massed formations, and the use of archers often proved decisive. The Sanskrit term for archery, dhanurveda, came to refer to martial arts in general.

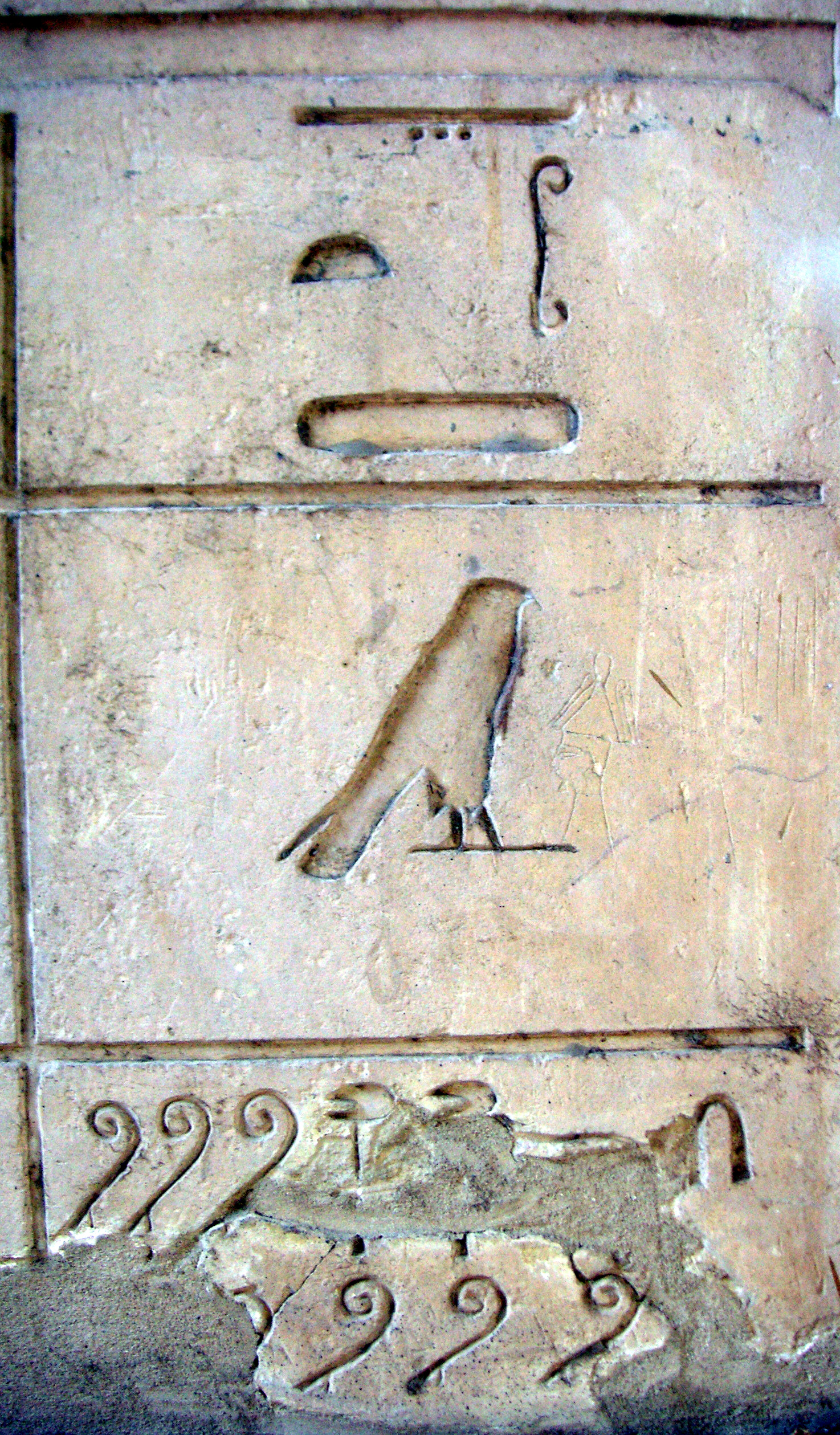
Ta-Seti (uppermost) at the "White Chapel" in Karnak.

=== North Africa ===
The ancient Egyptian people took to archery as early as 5,000 years ago. It was widespread by the time of the earliest pharaohs and was practiced both for hunting and use in warfare. Legendary figures from the tombs of Thebes are depicted giving "lessons in archery". Some Egyptian deities are also connected to archery. The "Nine bows" were a conventional representation of Egypt's external enemies. One of the oldest representations of the Nine bows is on the seated statue of Pharaoh Djoser (3rd Dynasty, 27th century BC). Many of the archers in service to Egypt were of Nubian extraction commonly referred to as Medjay, who go from a mercenary force during their initial service to Egypt in the Middle Kingdom to an elite paramilitary unit by the New Kingdom. So effective were the Nubians as archers that Nubia as a whole would be referred to Ta-Seti or land of the bow by the Ancient Egyptians.

=== Mesopotamia ===
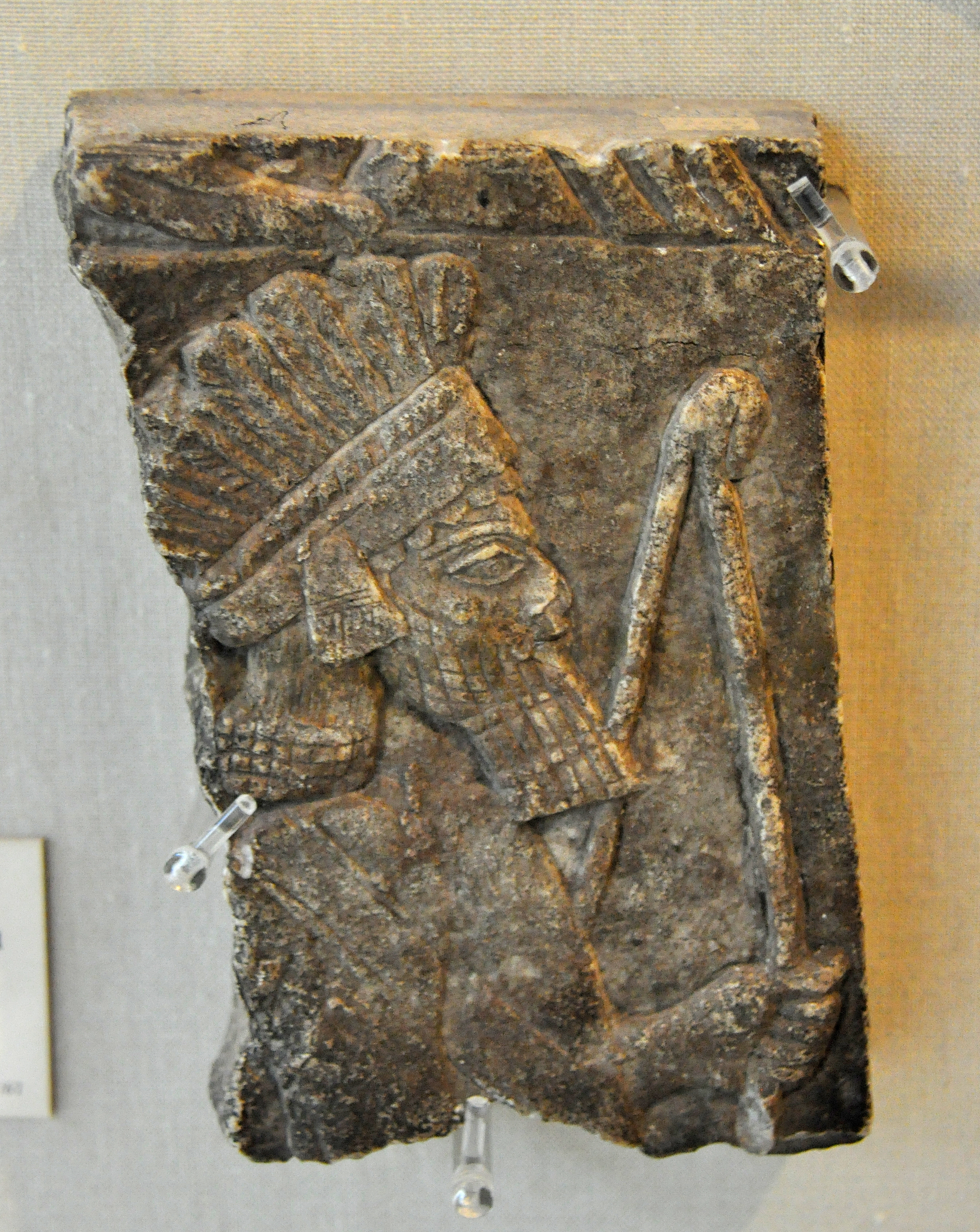
Archer wearing feather headdress. Alabaster. From Nineveh, Iraq. Reign of Ashurbanipal II, 668–627 BC. The Burrell Collection, Glasgow, UK.

The Assyrians and Babylonians extensively used the bow and arrow for hunting and warfare. The empires in ancient Mesopotamia formed the first standing armies used exclusively for warfare. This included soldiers trained and employed as archers. The archers served as an integral division of the military that was used on foot and on chariots. The bow and arrow, and the sport of archery as a whole, were one of the main components of the Assyrian army, and several Assyrian kings were depicted having a bow and arrow, marking it as a very important weapon in ancient societies.

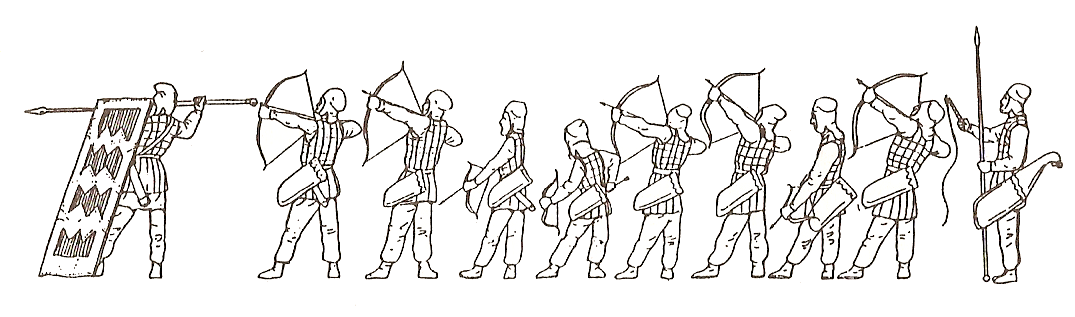
The ancient Persian sparabara units: nine rows of archers protected by one row of shield-bearers.

The Chariot warriors of the Kassites relied heavily on the bow. The Nuzi texts detail the bows and the number of arrows assigned to the chariot crew. Archery was essential to the role of the light horse-drawn chariot as a vehicle of warfare.

The Old Testament has multiple references to archery as a skill identified with the ancient Hebrews. Xenophon describes long bows used to great effect in Corduene.

Three-bladed (trilobate) arrowheads have been found in the United Arab Emirates, dated to 100 BC-150 AD.

=== Eurasian Steppes ===
The composite bow was first produced in the Eurasian Steppes during the Bronze Age, and from there it diffused throughout the Old World. The nomads from the Eurasian steppes are believed to play an integral part in introducing the composite bow to other civilizations, including Mesopotamia, Iran, India, East Asia, and Europe. There are arrowheads from the earliest chariot burials at Krivoye Lake, part of the Sintashta culture about 2100–1700 BC. These people are also believed to have invented spoke-wheeled chariots, and chariot archery became an integral component of the militaries of early Indo-Europeans.

Domestication of horses and mounted horseback archery are also believed to have originated in the Eurasian steppes. This revolutionized warfare as well as the practice of archery.

Scythian bowmen on gold plaque from Kul Oba kurgan, in Crimea, 4th century BC.

=== India ===
The use of bow and arrow was recorded extensively throughout the history of the Indian subcontinent.

The Paleolithic paintings of Bhimbetka rock shelters depict archery. Vedic hymns in the Rigveda, Yajurveda, and Atharvaveda lay emphasis on the use of the bow and arrow. The second Veda, the Yajurveda contains Dhanurveda (dhanus "bow" and veda "knowledge"), which was an ancient treatise on the science of archery and its use in warfare. The existence of Dhanurveda or "Science of Archery" in antiquity is evident from references made in several works of ancient literature. The Viṣṇu Purāṇa refers it as one of the eighteen branches of knowledge taught, while the Mahābhārata mentions it as having sutras like other vedas. Śukranīti describes it as that 'upaveda of yajurveda' which has five arts or practical aspects. The Dhanurveda enumerates the rules of archery, and describes the uses of weapons and the training the army. Besides providing the account of the training of the archers, Vasiṣṭha's Dhanurveda describes the different types of bows and arrows, as well as the process of making them. Detailed accounts of training methodologies in early India considered archery to be an essential martial skill in early India.

The composite bow in India was being used by 2nd millennium BCE. The bow was used extensively on foot as well on chariots. It was incorporated into the standing armies of the Mahajanapadas, and used in mounted warfare on horses, camels, and elephants with a howdah. The importance of archery continued through antiquity during the Maurya Empire. The Arthashastra, a military treatise written by Chanakya during the Maurya Era, goes in depth on the importance and implementation of archery. It also mentions an archery school at Taxila which enrolled 103 princes from different kingdoms across the empire.

During the era of the Gupta Empire mounted archery was largely supplanted by foot archers. This was in contrast to the nomadic armies on horseback from Central Asia such as the Iranian, Scythians, Parthians, Kushans, and Hunas. Later Indian kingdoms entities would maintain and field large numbers of mounted archers. The use of bows and arrows continued to be used as the mainstay of most Indian armies until the advent of firearms, introduced by Mongol gunpowder empires.

=== Greco-Roman antiquity ===
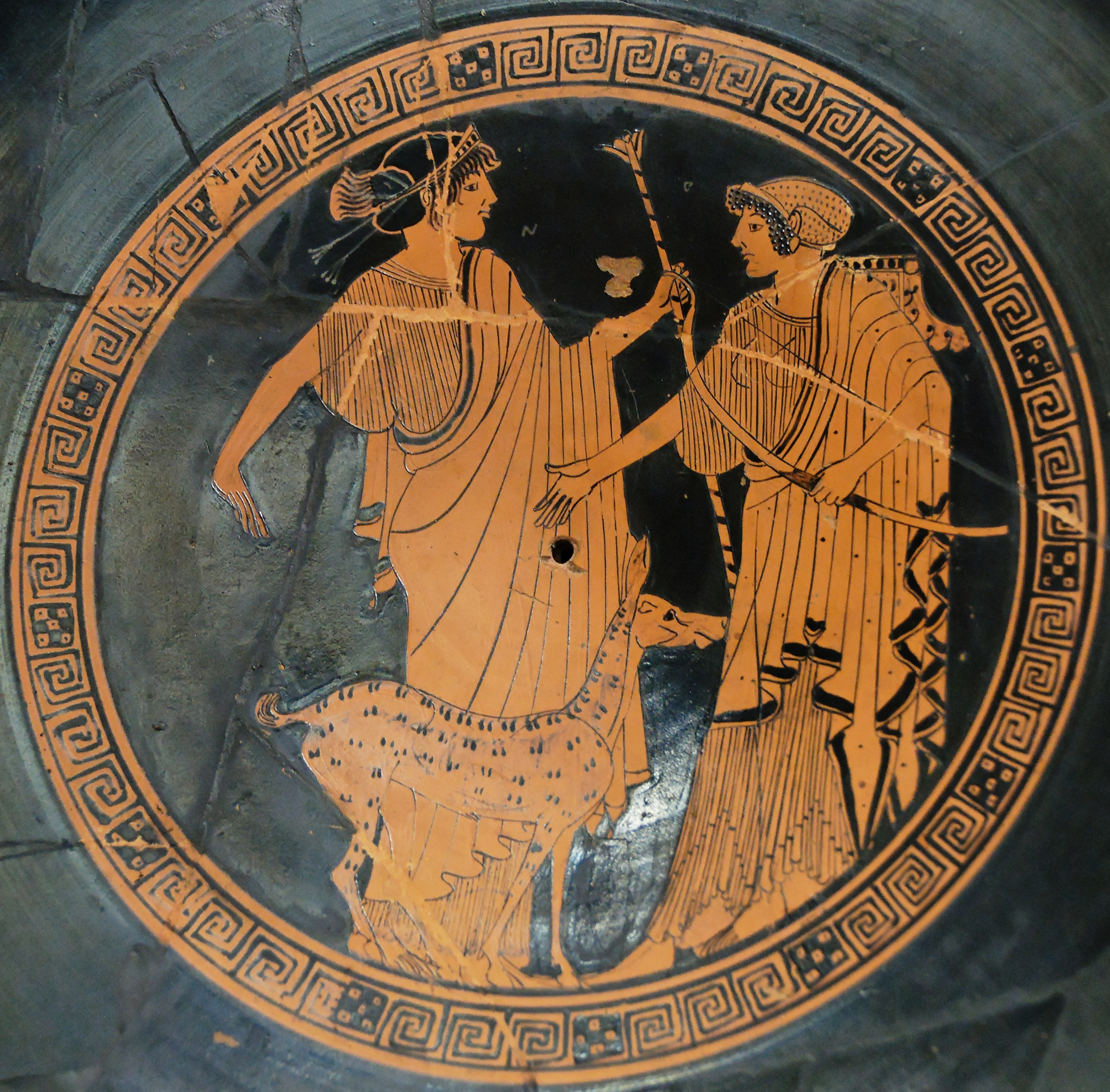
Apollo and Artemis. Tondo of an Attic red-figure cup, ca. 470 BC

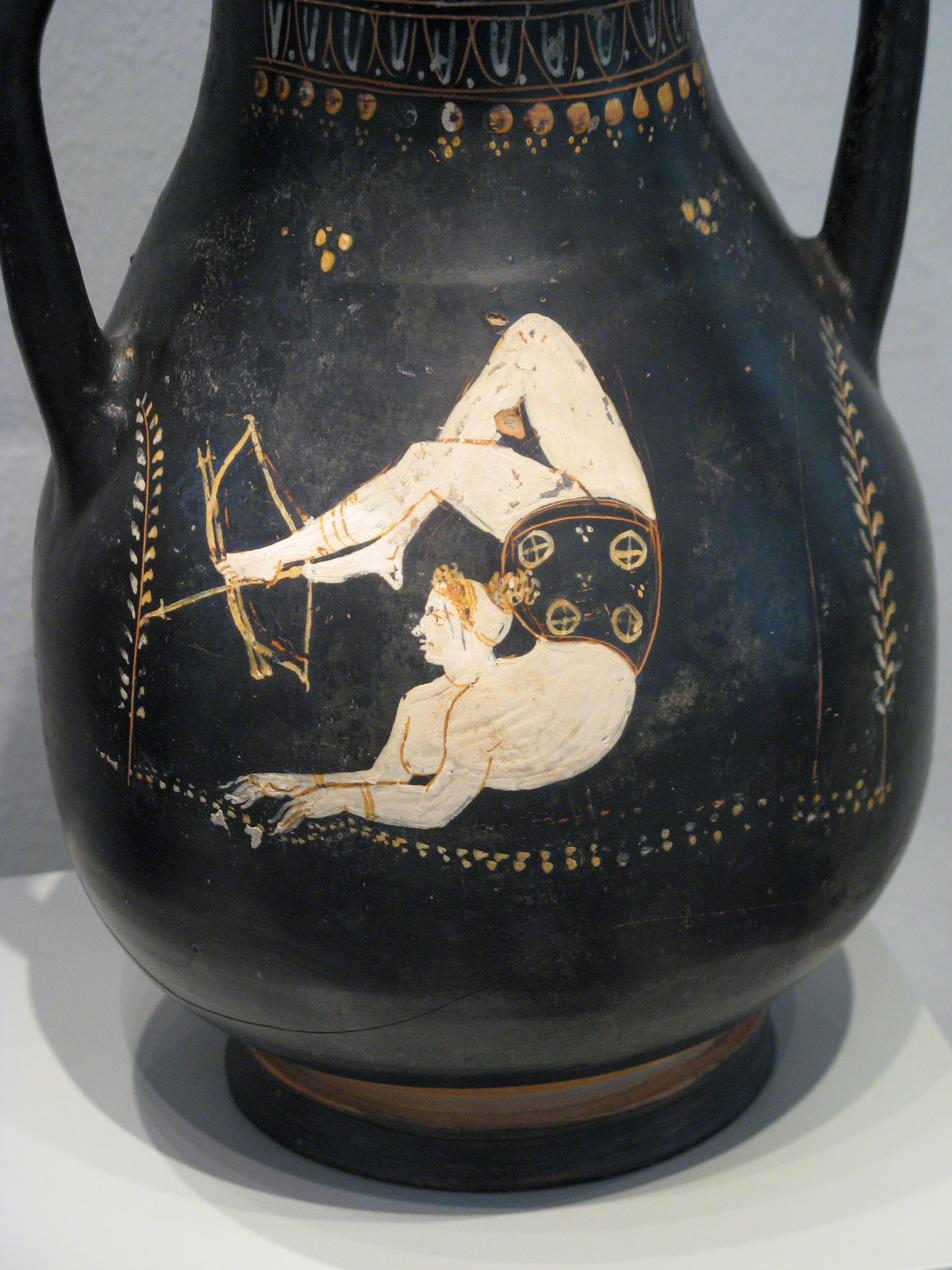
Female acrobat shooting an arrow with a bow in her feet (Gnathia style pelike, 4th century BC)

The people of Crete practiced archery and Cretan mercenary archers were in great demand. Crete was known for its unbroken tradition of archery.

During the invasion of India by Alexander the Great, archers are listed among the troops under his personal command.

The early Romans had few archers, if any. As the empire grew, auxiliary archers were recruited from other nations. Julius Caesar's armies in Gaul included Cretan archers, and his enemy Vercingetorix declared "all the archers, of whom there was a very great number in Gaul, to be collected". By the 4th century, archers with powerful composite bows were a regular part of the imperial Roman armies. During the fall of the western empire, the Romans came under severe pressure from the highly skilled mounted archers of the Hun invaders, and later Eastern Roman armies relied heavily on horse archery.

=== East Asia ===
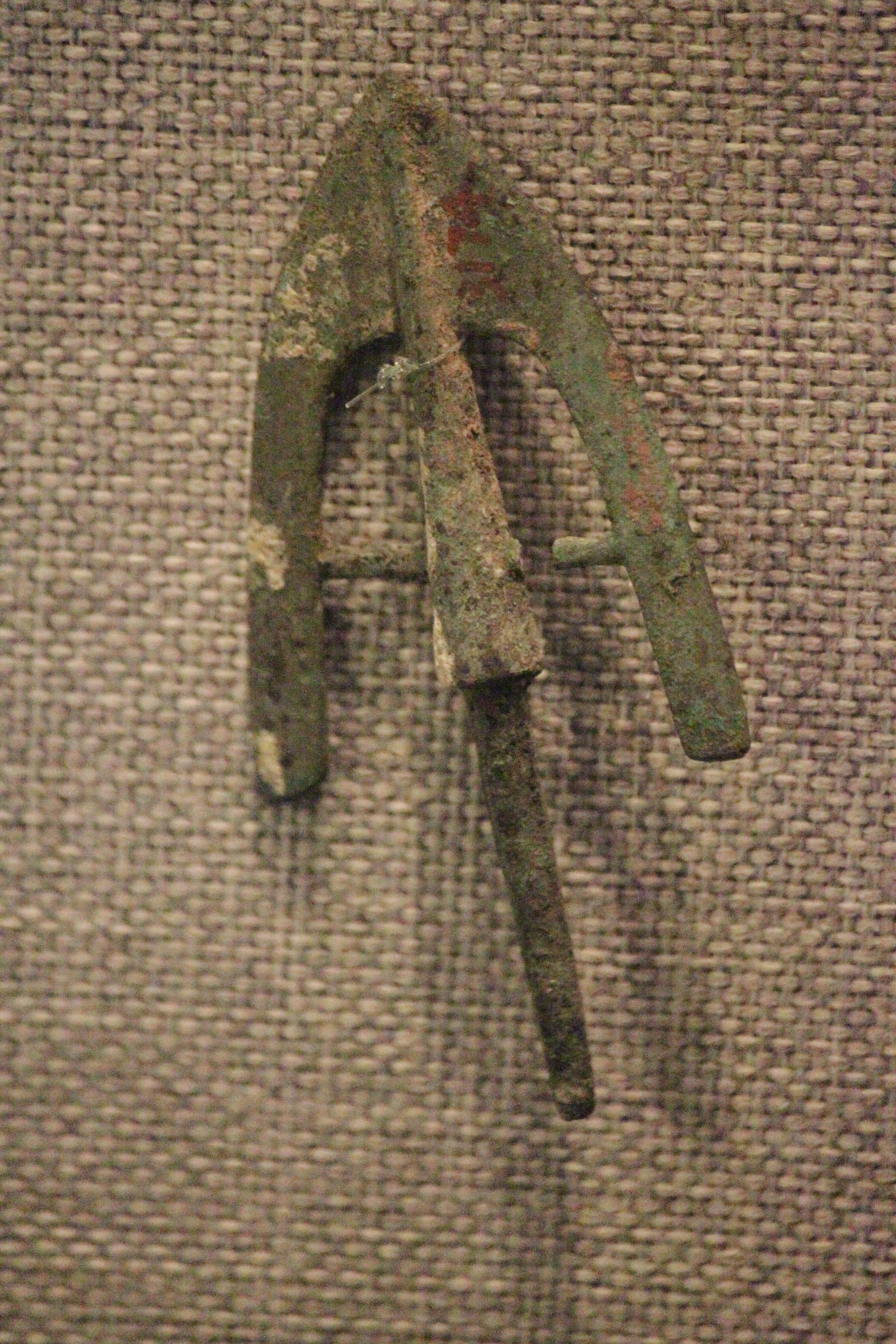
Winged arrowhead, Warring States period

Archery featured prominently in ancient Chinese culture and philosophy Confucius himself was an archery teacher; and Lie Zi (a Daoist philosopher) was an avid archer. In China, crossbows were developed, and Han Dynasty writers attributed Chinese success in battles against nomad invaders to the massed use of crossbows, first definitely attested at the Battle of Ma-Ling in 341 BC. Because the cultures associated with Chinese society spanned a wide geography and time range, the techniques and equipment associated with Chinese archery are diverse.

== Medieval history ==
=== Europe ===
At the start of the medieval period, shortbows were used for both hunting and warfare. Medieval shortbows were structurally similar to ancient bows, but new construction materials significantly increased their usefulness. With a range of about 100yds a shortbow had the ability to kill or injure an unarmoured man at close range, but were often ineffective against armour. Vikings made extensive use of shortbows both on land and at sea, but other early medieval armies less so, with some notable exceptions. Both sides used archers at the Battle of Hastings, and the Norman archers struck a decisive blow by firing their arrows into the air (avoiding shields and armour which they could not penetrate) and wounding Saxon King Harold. The shortbow remained the primary ranged weapon throughout early medieval Europe. Archers were usually unarmoured, and were typically peasants or townsmen rather than nobles or men-at-arms.

Around the tenth century the crossbow was introduced in Europe. Crossbows generally had a longer range, greater accuracy and more penetration than the shortbow, but suffered from a much slower rate of fire. Unlike the longbow they did not require special skill or strength to use effectively. They were also controversial, attracting stigma to those who used them, and were outlawed by the Lateran Council of 1139. Despite this, crossbows were used in the early Crusades, with models having a range of 300 yd (274 m) and being able to penetrate armour or kill a horse. They fired short metal bolts rather than arrows. The French army relied substantially on the crossbow in late medieval times.

The longbow first appeared in Europe in the 13th century, although similar weapons were described in antiquity. It did not appear with any frequency until the 14th. Like their shortbow predecessors longbow archers were more likely to be peasants or yeomen than men-at-arms. The longbow had a similar range and penetration as the crossbow, but a much higher rate of fire. It also required more skill and strength to use effectively than a crossbow. Its lack of accuracy at long ranges made it a mass weapon rather than an individual one. During the late medieval period the English army famously relied on massed archers armed with the longbow.

From the fourteenth century onwards in England the longbow was not only a military weapon but was reinforced as a civic duty through statute law and local enforcement. Measures required male householders and their servants (and often children) to own bows and practise archery, while games such as football and bowls were prohibited. In Tudor times towns such as Bristol, Leicester and Worcester built or repaired public “butts” (archery ranges) and church-wardens’ accounts show regular payments for the making of these sites, particularly during the heightened invasion fears of the 1540s. Court records show that local authorities fined a wide cross-section of townsmen – from labourers to merchants and officials – who failed to own a bow or attend practice, indicating that archery was treated as a social obligation rather than purely an activity. This coordinated plan of regulation, civic infrastructure and surveillance underpinned England’s continuity of archery training into the early modern period.

In the Scottish Highlands, archers were used in battle until 1689 at Killiekrankie, with a documented fatal shot from the Hanoverian Government army. They were last used in large numbers during the final clan battle between the MacDonalds and the Mackintoshes in 1688. Highlanders are most regularly recorded or depicted using the short recurve or "McNaughton Bow" in this period. Significant victories attributable to the longbow, such as the Battle of Crecy and Battle of Agincourt resulted in the English longbow becoming part of military lore. In both England and Scotland legislation was passed to ensure a supply of trained longbowmen, such as the Unlawful Games Act 1541 which prohibited "Several new devised Games" that might detract from archery training.

=== The Middle East ===
In the Middle East the composite bow was the preferred bow in the later medieval period. More powerful than the shortbow, they had the advantage over the longer longbow that they could be fired from horseback. However, they also required skilled craftsmen to manufacture, and, like the longbow, extensive training to use well. The Byzantine Empire was already using mounted archers extensively by the 5th century, and the Emperor Mavrikios laid down principles for their use in his seminal military work the Strategikon of Maurice. The core of the Byzantine army was the Cataphract, an armoured horse archer. The Byzantines also recruited mercenary light mounted archers from the Steppes.

Turkish tribes, of which the Seljuk Turks are representative, used mounted archers against the European First Crusade, especially at the Battle of Dorylaeum (1097). Their archers were more lightly armoured than the Cataphracts, and consequently more mobile. Their tactic was to fire at the enemy infantry, and use their superior mobility to prevent the enemy from closing with them.

=== Asia ===
The Mongol armies of Genghis Khan and his successors relied almost exclusively on mounted warriors, who used the Mongol bow (a form of recurve composite bow) as their principal weapon. Mongol bows of that period were constructed from leather, horn, and wood with animal sinew outside, held together with fish glue and covered with tree bark to protect against water. 13th century bows were said to be able to shoot 700–800 meters accurately. Warriors would carry two bows, a long one for shooting at range and a short one for close fighting. They also carried different types of arrows for different uses, some of which could pierce thick armour. The bow was also used for hunting, and warriors were trained from an early age, and competed in tournaments.

In Korea Joseon adopted a military-service examination system from China that included a focus on archery skills and that contributed to the development of Korean archery as a practical martial art.

In Asia archery was one of the Six Noble Arts of the Zhou dynasty of China (1146–256 BC); archery skill was a virtue for Chinese emperors.

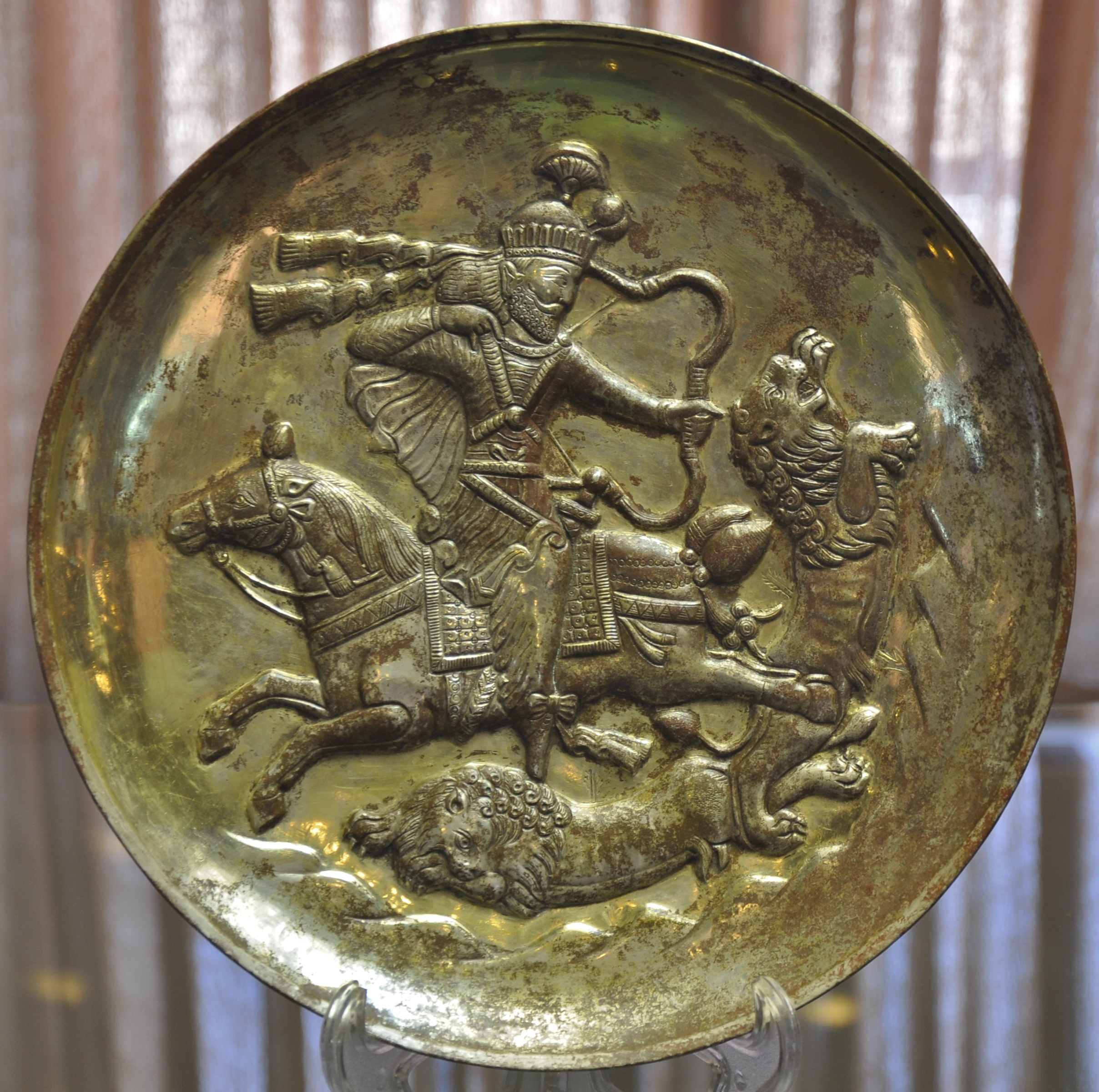
Sasanian king is shooting an arrow on a horse to hunt two lion

The Sasanian general Bahram Chobin has been credited with writing a manual of archery in the tenth century in Ibn al-Nadim's catalogue Kitab al-Fihrist.

A complete arrow of 75 cm (along with other fragments and arrow heads) dated back to 1283 AD, was discovered inside a cave situated in the Qadisha Valley, Lebanon.

A treatise on Arab archery by Muḥammad ibn Abī Bakr, called Ibn Qayyim Al-Jawziyya (1292–1350 AD) comes from the 14th century.

A treatise on Saracen archery was written in 1368. This was a didactic poem on archery dedicated to a Mameluke sultan by Ṭaibughā al-Ashrafī.

A 14th-century treatise on Arab archery, Kitāb fī maʿrifat ʿilm ramy al-sihām, was written by Hussain bin Abd al-Rahman.

A treatise, A Book on the Excellence of the Bow & Arrow of c. 1500 details the practices and techniques of archery among the Arabs of that time.

An anonymous book written in Picardy, France, in the late 15th century details how archery in medieval Europe was practiced. The book was titled Le Fachon de tirer l'arc a main. It describes the means of how a yew bow could be made, the kinds of wood that could be used, how to shoot it, string it and different kind of arrows. According to the writer, its purpose is for posterity, possibly due to the rise of the gun.

In Mali, the footmen were dominated by archers. Three archers to one spearman was the general ratio of Malian formations in the 16th century. The archers generally opened battle, softening up the enemy for cavalry charges or the advance of the spearmen.

== Decline of archery ==
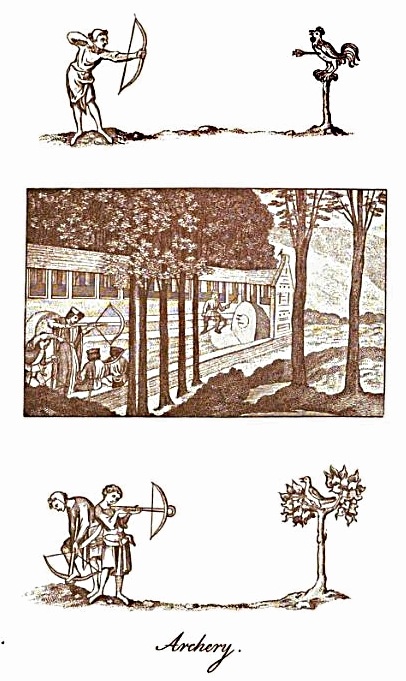
Panels depicting Archery in England from Joseph Strutt's 1801 book, The sports and pastimes of the people of England from the earliest period. The date of the top image is unknown; the middle image is from 1496 and the bottom panel is circa fourteenth century.

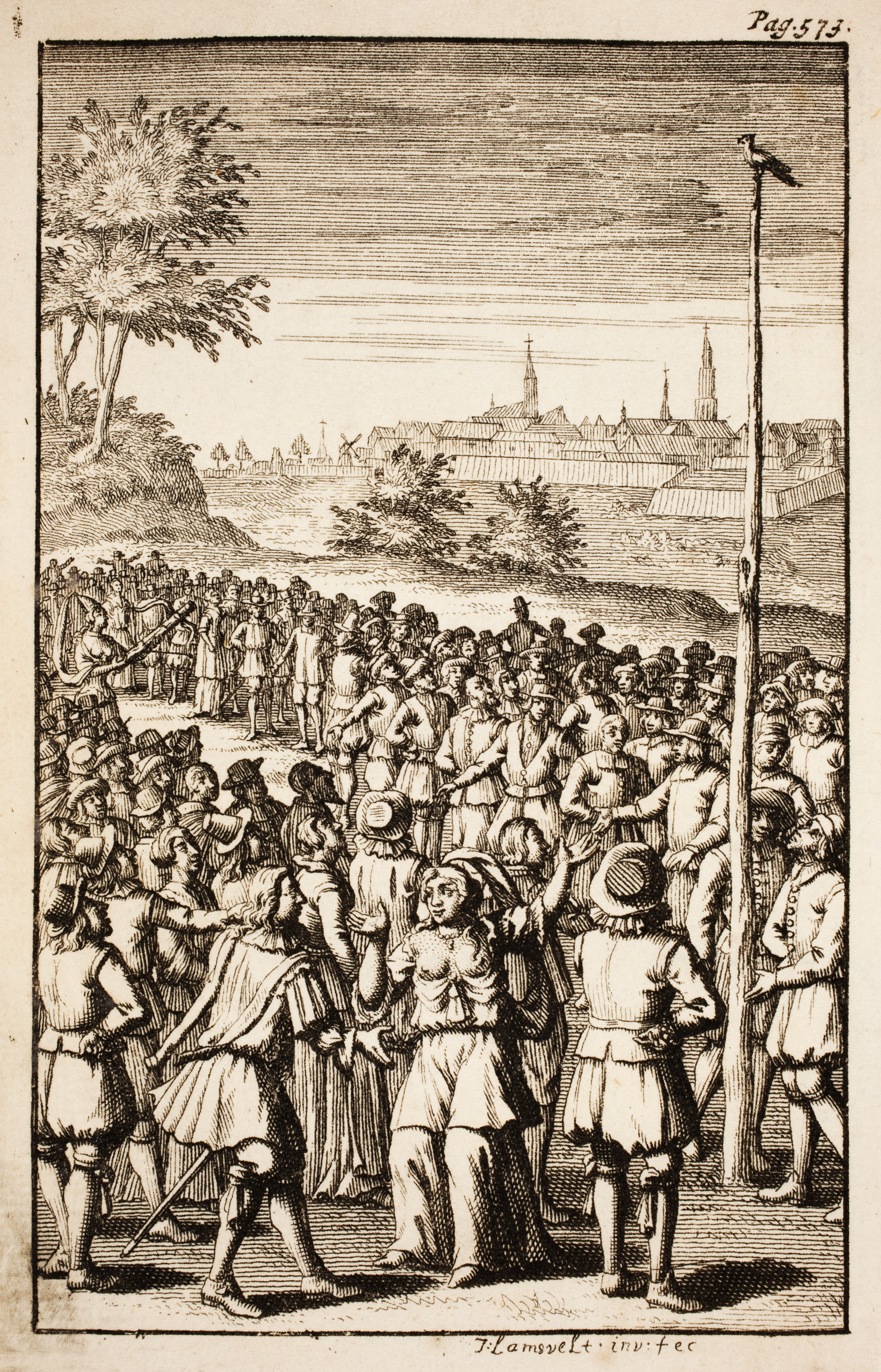
Archery game outside the town. Jan Lamsvelt in Van Heemskerk: Batavische Arcadia, 1708.

The advent of firearms eventually rendered bows obsolete in warfare. Despite the high social status, ongoing utility, and widespread pleasure of archery, almost every culture that gained access to even early firearms used them widely, to the relative neglect of archery.

"Have them bring as many guns as possible, for no other equipment is needed. Give strict orders that all men, even the samurai, carry guns."

— Asano Yukinaga, 1598

In Ireland, Geoffrey Keating (c. 1569 – c. 1644) mentions archery as having been practiced "down to a recent period within our own memory."

Early firearms were inferior in rate of fire (a Tudor English author expects eight shots from the English longbow in the time needed for a "ready shooter" to give five from the musket), and François Bernier reports that well-trained mounted archers at the Battle of Samugarh in 1658 were "shooting six times before a musketeer can fire twice". Firearms were also very susceptible to wet weather. However, they had a longer effective range (up to 200 yards for the longbow, up to 600 yards for the musket), greater penetration, were extremely powerful compared to any previous man-portable missile weapon (16th century arquebuses and muskets had 1,300 to 3,000 joules per shot depending on size and powder load, as compared to 80–100 joules for a typical longbow arrow or 150–200 joules for a crossbow bolt), and were tactically superior in the common situation of soldiers shooting at each other from behind obstructions. They also penetrated steel armour without any need to develop special musculature. Armies equipped with guns could thus provide superior firepower, and highly trained archers became obsolete on the battlefield. The Battle of Cerignola in 1503 was won by Spain mainly by the use of matchlock firearms, marking the first time a major battle in Europe was won through the use of firearms.

The last regular unit armed with bows was the Archers' Company of the Honourable Artillery Company, ironically a part of the oldest regular unit in England to be armed with gunpowder weapons. The last recorded use of bows in battle in England seems to have been a skirmish at Bridgnorth; in October 1642, during the English Civil War, an impromptu militia, armed with bows, was effective against un-armoured musketmen. The last use of the bow in battle in Britain is said to have occurred at the Battle of Tippermuir in Scotland on 1 September 1644, when James Graham, 1st Marquess of Montrose's Royalist highlanders defeated an army of Scottish Covenanters. Among Montrose's army were bowmen.

Archery continued in some areas that were subject to limitations on the ownership of arms, such as the Scottish Highlands during the repression that followed the decline of the Jacobite cause, and the Cherokees after the Trail of Tears. The Tokugawa shogunate severely limited the import and manufacture of guns, and encouraged traditional martial skills among the samurai; towards the end of the Satsuma Rebellion in 1877, some rebels fell back on the use of bows and arrows. Archery remained an important part of the military examinations until 1894 in Korea and 1904 in China.

Within the steppe of Eurasia, archery continued to play an important part in warfare, although now restricted to mounted archery. The Ottoman Empire still fielded auxiliary cavalry which was noted for its use of bows from horseback. This practice was continued by the Ottoman subject nations, despite the Empire itself being a proponent of early firearms. The practice declined after the Crimean Khanate was absorbed by Russia; however mounted archers remained in the Ottoman order of battle until the post-1826 reforms to the Ottoman Army. The art of traditional archery remained in minority use for sport and for hunting in Turkey up until the 1920s, but the knowledge of constructing composite bows fell out of use with the death of the last bowyer in the 1930s. The rest of the Middle East also lost the continuity of its archery tradition at this time.

An exception to this trend was the Comanche culture of North America, where mounted archery remained competitive with muzzle-loading guns. "After ... about 1800, most Comanches began to discard muskets and pistols and to rely on their older weapons." Repeating firearms, however, were superior in turn, and the Comanches adopted them when they could. Bows remained effective hunting weapons for skilled horse archers, used to some extent by all Native Americans on the Great Plains to hunt buffalo as long as there were buffalo to hunt. The last Comanche hunt was in 1878, and it failed for lack of buffalo, not lack of appropriate weapons.

Ongoing use of bows and arrows was maintained in isolated cultures with little or no contact with the outside world. The use of traditional archery in some African conflicts has been reported in the 21st century, and the Sentinelese still use bows as part of a lifestyle scarcely touched by outside contact. A remote group in Brazil, recently photographed from the air, aimed bows at the aeroplane. Bows and arrows saw considerable use in the 2007–2008 Kenyan crisis. West Papua National Liberation Army is still using bows and arrows to attack Indonesian soldiers.

== Recreational revival ==
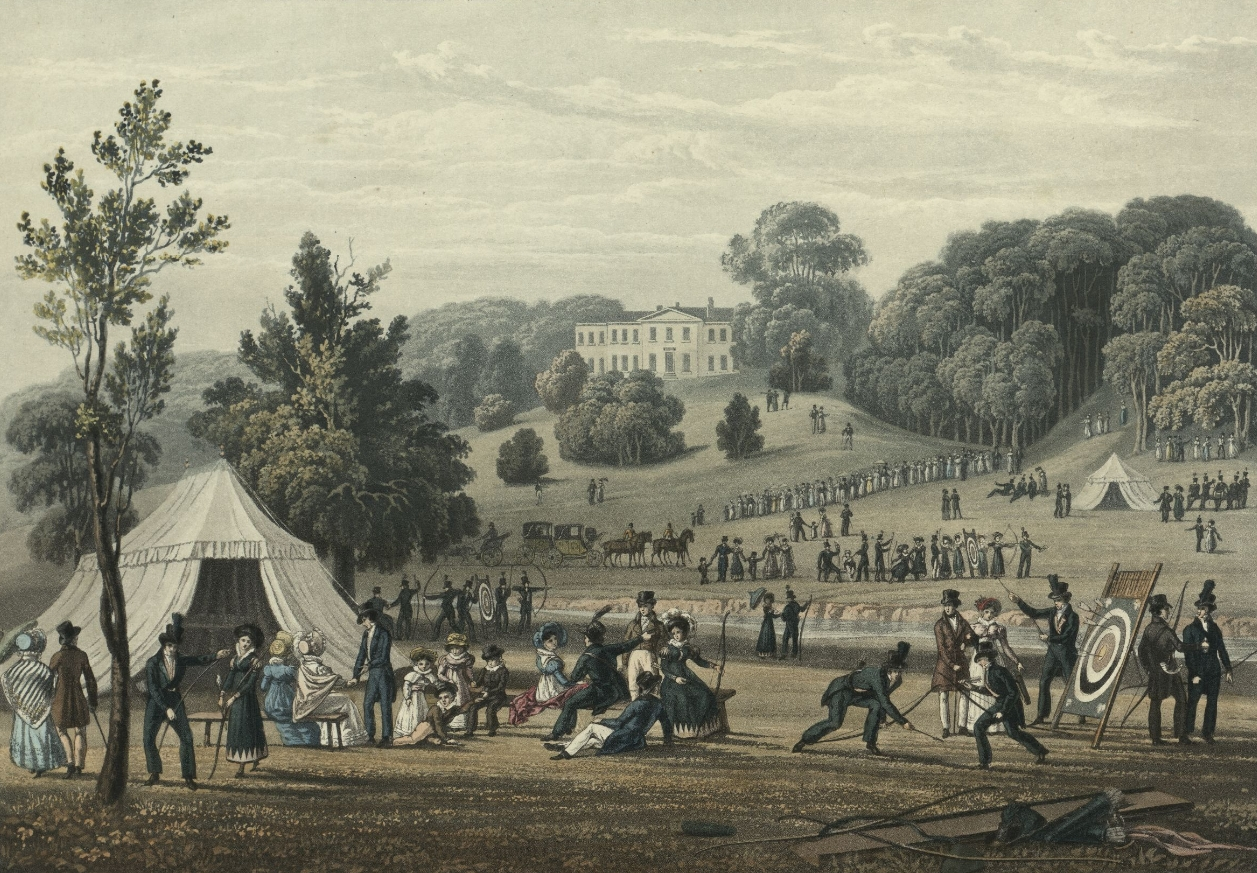
A print of the 1822 meeting of the "Royal British Bowmen" archery club.

The British initiated a major revival of archery as an upper-class pursuit from about 1780–1840. Early recreational archery societies included the Finsbury Archers and the Kilwinning Papingo, established in 1688. The latter held competitions in which the archers had to dislodge a wooden parrot from the top of an abbey tower. The Company of Scottish Archers was formed in 1676 and is one of the oldest sporting bodies in the world. It remained a small and scattered pastime, however, until the late 18th century when it experienced a fashionable revival among the aristocracy. Sir Ashton Lever, an antiquarian and collector, formed the Toxophilite Society in London in 1781, with the patronage of George, the Prince of Wales.

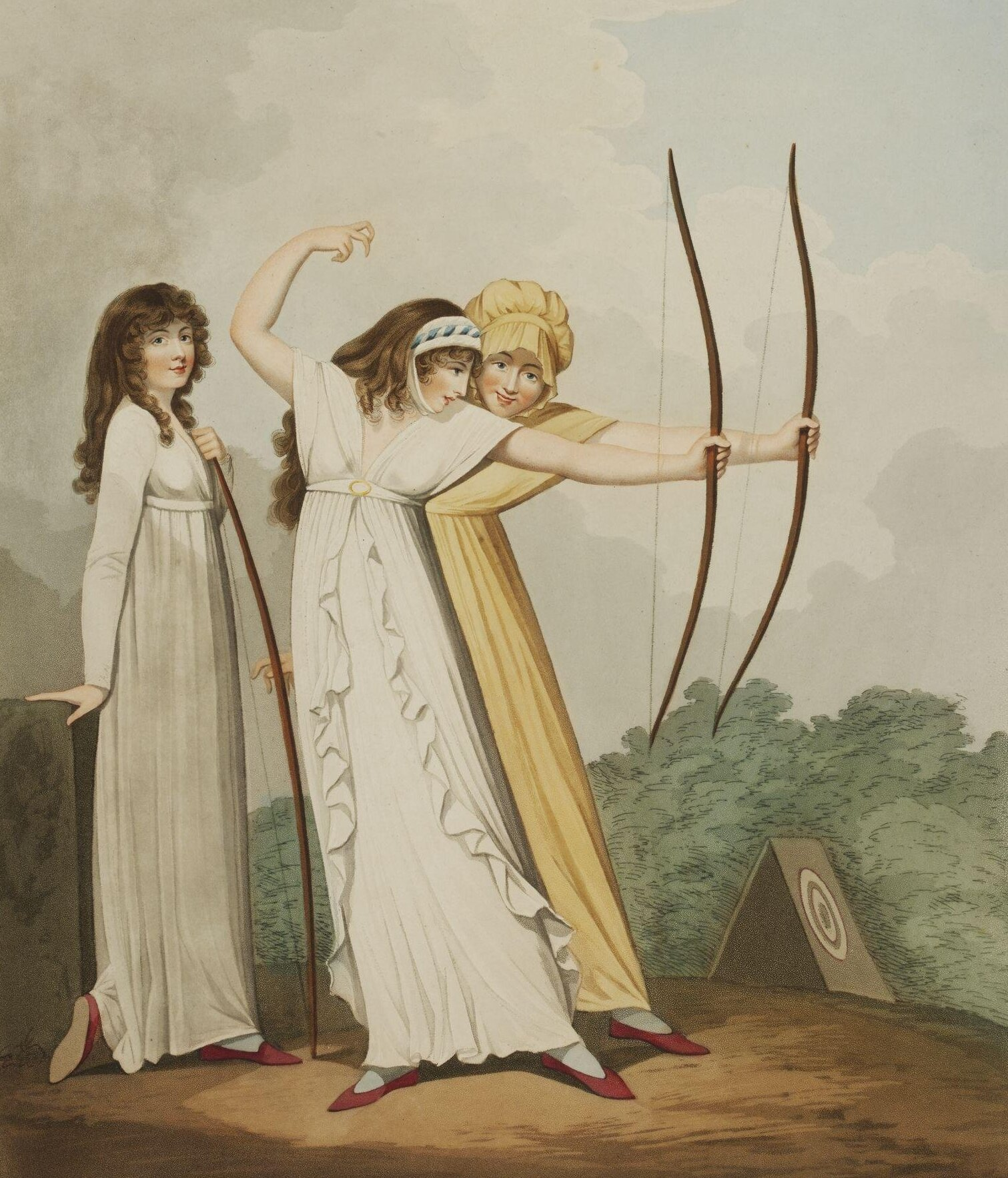
Fashionable female archers, 1799

Archery societies were set up across the country, each with its own strict entry criteria and outlandish costumes. Recreational archery soon became extravagant social and ceremonial events for the nobility, complete with flags, music and 21 gun salutes for the competitors. The clubs were "the drawing rooms of the great country houses placed outside" and thus came to play an important role in the social networks of local elites. As well as its emphasis on display and status, the sport was notable for its popularity with females. Young women could not only compete in the contests but retain and show off their sexuality while doing so. Thus, archery came to act as a forum for introductions, flirtation and romance. It was often consciously styled in the manner of a Medieval tournament with titles and laurel wreaths being presented as a reward to the victor. General meetings were held from 1789, in which local lodges convened together to standardise the rules and ceremonies. Archery was also co-opted as a distinctively British tradition, dating back to the lore of Robin Hood and it served as a patriotic form of entertainment at a time of political tension in Europe. The societies were also elitist, and the new middle class bourgeoisie were excluded from the clubs due to their lack of social status.

After the Napoleonic Wars, the sport became increasingly popular among all classes, and it was framed as a nostalgic reimagining of the preindustrial rural Britain. Particularly influential was Sir Walter Scott's 1819 novel, Ivanhoe that depicted the heroic character Locksley winning an archery tournament.

== A modern sport ==
The 1840s saw the first attempts at turning the recreation into a modern sport. The first Grand National Archery Society meeting was held in York in 1844 and over the next decade the extravagant and festive practices of the past were gradually whittled away and the rules were standardised as the 'York Round' – a series of shoots at 60, 80, and 100 yards. Horace A. Ford helped to improve archery standards and pioneered new archery techniques. He won the Grand National 11 times in a row and published a highly influential guide to the sport in 1856.

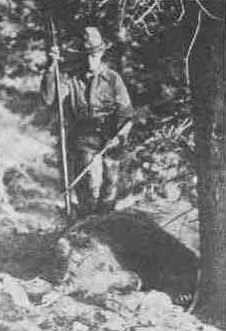
Picture of Pope taken while grizzly hunting at Yellowstone

Towards the end of the 19th century, the sport experienced declining participation as alternative sports such as croquet and tennis became more popular among the middle class. By 1889, just 50 archery clubs were left in Britain, but it was still included as a sport at the 1900 Paris Olympics.

In the United States, primitive archery was revived in the early 20th century. The last of the Yahi Indian tribe, a native known as Ishi, came out of hiding in California in 1911. His doctor, Saxton Pope, learned many of Ishi's traditional archery skills, and popularized them. The Pope and Young Club, founded in 1961 and named in honor of Pope and his friend, Arthur Young, became one of North America's leading bowhunting and conservation organizations. Founded as a nonprofit scientific organization, the club was patterned after the prestigious Boone and Crockett Club and advocated responsible bowhunting by promoting quality, fair chase hunting, and sound conservation practices.

In Korea, the transformation of archery to a healthy pastime was led by Emperor Gojong, and is the basis of a popular modern sport. The Japanese continue to make and use their unique traditional equipment. Among the Cherokees, popular use of their traditional longbows never died out.

In China, at the beginning of the 21st century, there has been revival in interest among craftsmen looking to construct bows and arrows, as well as in practicing technique in the traditional Chinese style.

In modern times, mounted archery continues to be practiced as a popular competitive sport in modern Hungary and in some Asian countries but it is not recognized as an international competition. Archery is the national sport of the Kingdom of Bhutan.

From the 1920s, professional engineers took an interest in archery, previously the exclusive field of traditional craft experts. They led the commercial development of new forms of bow including the modern recurve and compound bow. These modern forms are now dominant in modern Western archery; traditional bows are in a minority. In the 1980s, the skills of traditional archery were revived by American enthusiasts, and combined with the new scientific understanding. Much of this expertise is available in the Traditional Bowyer's Bibles (see Further reading). Modern game archery owes much of its success to Fred Bear, an American bow hunter and bow manufacturer.

== See also ==
- Archery
- Arash
- Kyūdō, Japanese archery
- Yabusame, Japanese horseback archery
- Gungdo, Korean archery
- Toxophilus, the first book on archery written in English
- Turkish archery
- Chinese archery
- Archery in India
