= Archery GB =

UK sports governing body

- Sport: Archery
- Abbreviation: AGB
- Founded: 1861
- Affiliation: WA
- Chairman: Mark Briegal
- CEO: Sarah Jones

Official website
- www.archerygb.org
- (United Kingdom)

Archery GB is the largest national governing body for the sport of archery in the United Kingdom. Archery GB is responsible for all levels of archery within the UK from elite to development level and supports over 40,000 members. Archery GB is the umbrella organisation for English Archery Association, Archery Northern Ireland, Scottish Archery and Welsh Archery Association. Under Archery GB are eight Regional Societies and many different county societies. It is affiliated to the World Archery Federation (WA); (formerly FITA, the Fédération Internationale de Tir à l'Arc) and is a member of the British Olympic Association. The society's motto is: "Union, Trueheart and Courtesie".

Archery GB is the trading name of the Grand National Archery Society, a company limited by guarantee no. 1342150 Registered in England

== Role ==
Archery GB is the largest governing organisation of target archery, field archery, 3D archery, flight and clout archery in the United Kingdom; the society is in management of the Olympic and Paralympic World Class programmes funded by UK Sport.

The society is responsible for over 750 clubs and 32,000 registered members across the UK, all of whom may receive the magazine Archery UK twice a year, included in their affiliation. It also organises its own national tournaments such as the National Tour and is responsible for training coaches and judges, as well as ensuring affiliated clubs are covered by their public liability insurance policy. These costs are partly covered by affiliation fees, which all club members pay, both to county and regional associations and Archery GB itself.

== History ==
The first Grand National Archery Meeting was held on the Knavesmire at York in 1843 but the Grand National Archery Society (later Archery GB) itself was not founded until 1861, when it met at the Adelphi Hotel in Liverpool. It confined its early activities to organising the Annual National Championships, being at that time just one of many archery Societies; and it did not become the governing body for the UK until much later.

Three older and historically important societies – all of which survive today – were the Royal Toxophilites (founded in 1781), the Woodmen of Arden (founded in 1785), and the Royal Company of Archers (founded in 1676). They are independent of the GNAS, although some members may belong to both.

With archery now firmly established in the Olympics, GNAS/Archery GB has seen many international successes and British archers have won a total of 4 medals since the restoration of the sport in the 1972 Olympic Games.

== National events ==
Archery GB hold a series of National Championships, Events and also a National Tour where archers compete over a series of events around the UK and gain points to qualify for a grand finals.

Event	Series
The National Tour
The Grand National Archery Meeting
The British Target Championships
Archery GB Youth Festival
Junior National Outdoors
National County Team Championships
UK Masters
Junior Masters
50+ Masters
National Indoors
Junior Indoors
Back2Back

== Rebranding as Archery GB ==
At the Annual General Meeting held at Lilleshall on 19 April 2008, an official announcement was made confirming that "Archery GB" would become the trading name of the GNAS. An item in the Summer 2008 edition of Archery UK, the official GNAS magazine, states:

This seminal moment in the Society's history formalises a transition that is already in its infancy with the elite archers sporting new Archery GB branding. From this point on, the Archery GB brand will represent all facets of the organisation including the Olympic team, coaching programmes, events and membership. This change has come due to recognition that the Grand National Archery Society brand, whilst naturally close to many hearts, does not reflect the breadth and standing of the organisation representing British archery on a global scale. The logo is outdated and rather pale and the name conjures up images of an insular organisation with a penchant for horse-racing, which is an unfair reflection of a governing body of such stature.
