= Woodmen of Arden =

The Woodmen of the Ancient Forest of Arden are an exclusive society of longbow shooting toxophilites, founded (or possibly re-founded) in 1785 in the village of Meriden, in the Borough of Solihull, in the ancient Forest of Arden.

== History ==
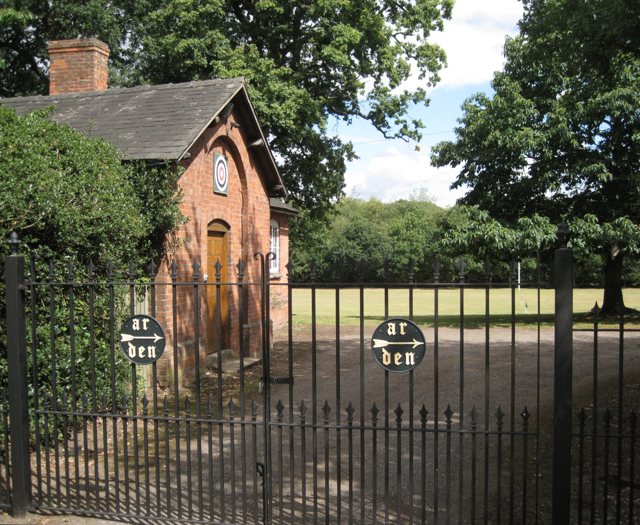
The Gates to Forest Hall, home of the Woodmen of Arden

The society was founded by Heneage Finch, 4th Earl of Aylesford and five other men at the Bulls Head coaching inn in the village of Meriden in 1785. The society itself however considers this date the re-founding, claiming that their society is a revival of a much older organisation of Woodmen of the Forest of Arden. The ancient Royal Forests of England were subject to forest law, which was exercised by a number of ancient offices of woodmen including the forest warden, forester and verderer – there is however scant evidence that the forest of Arden was ever itself governed by forest law. Nonetheless, the society claims this heritage and utilises some of these titles for its officers. The meetings of the society are called Wardmotes. During the era of Forest Law, verderers and woodwards would police the forests with bow and arrow, and archery forms the basis of the modern society. The society practices clout archery according to the regulations of Finsbury Fields from 1590, and employ target distances prescribed in statute – in this case the Unlawful Games Act 1541, which mandated shooting no less than 180 yards.

Heneage Finch had been practicing archery at his Meriden estate Packington Hall for a number of years before founding the society, and it is claimed he had connections with the Royal British Bowmen, Royal Kentish Bowmen and the Royal Toxophilite Society. A sward was established to shoot on at Packington Outwoods, and an octagonal structure, now known as Forest Hall (similar to the forest courts of old like Speech House in the New Forest) was established as a club house in 1788. The first secretary was Wriothesly Digby of the Digby's of Coleshill.

In 1786 the title of the head of the society was changed from 'Captain of the Grand Target' to 'Perpetual Warden of the Forest', and his deputy the Lieutenant of the Grand Target was renamed as Senior Verdurer. The archer who hits the first gold in shooting for the horn is named Master Forester. The winner of the gold medal is known as the 'Captain of Numbers' and the winner of the silver medal the 'Lieutenant of Numbers'.

In 1788 the number of members was limited to 75; the limit was increased to 80 in 1815.

In 1835 the society elected Prime Minister Sir Robert Peel, Lord of the Manor of Hampton in Arden, without a vacancy – the only time the rule restricting the society to 80 members has ever been broken.

In the early 19th century a neoclassical pavilion was added to the Outwoods where the society shoot.

== Uniform ==
The society has a uniform originally designed in 1785, modelled on the uniforms of verderers, and little changed today, of white trousers, green tailcoat, and a green tie beneath a buff weskit. A hat was added 100 years later. They use yew tree longbows, and must create a unique 'cresting' or mark on their arrows.

== Traditions ==
=== The Silver Bugle of Arden ===
In 1787 the society was presented with a large silver bugle, called the Silver Bugle of Arden, by the Earl of Aylesford as a prize, it is never shot for at a distance "less than nine score yards", which may be extended to "twelve score".

=== The Silver Arrow ===
In 1788 the countess of Aylesford presented to the society the "silver arrow", to be annually shot for at "nine score yards".

=== The Digbean Medals ===
In 1818 Wriothesley Digby, the Secretary of the society, donated a gold medal, the 'Optime merenti', for the greatest number of hits at 100 yards during the August meeting. He also presented a silver medal 'Bene merenti' for the second best.

=== The Royal Scottish Archers Silver Bowl ===
In 1887 the Royal Company of Archers of Scotland presented a silver bowl as a challenge price for clout shooting. It is competed for "by points at nine and ten score".

== Notable members ==
Membership is largely drawn from the old aristocratic and gentry families of the region, such as the Digbys of Coleshill, Greswoldes of Solihull, and the Barons of Norton. Other notable members have included:

- Robert Peel (former UK Prime Minister)
- Jeremy Brett (actor)

== See also ==
- Royal Company of Archers
- Worshipful Company of Bowyers
- Worshipful Company of Fletchers
