= Bladelet =

Bladelets can refer to:

- Bladelet (impeller)
- Bladelet (archaeology)
