= Archery UK =

Archery UK is a magazine devoted to the sport of archery in the United Kingdom. It is the official journal of Archery GB, which has more than 40,000 members. The headquarters is in Hatfield, Herts.

== History and profile ==
The magazine was first published in 1997. The first colour issue was produced in summer 2005. Since then there have been a number of redesigns and the pagination has grown from 40 to 84. The magazine is published by the Archery GB, based at the Lilleshall National Sports and Conferencing Centre, Shropshire. The magazine is published quarterly and is part of the membership package. It is also available online and in PDF format at the Archery GB website.

The first editor was Ann Shepherd. She was succeeded by Peter Jones and, in 2011, Jane Percival.

== Contents ==
The magazine contains all the latest news about archery in the United Kingdom, as well as reports from club, national and international tournaments. Other regular features include:

- Expert tips on technique
- The latest development news
- The latest from Performance and Talent
- Exclusives and competitions
- Junior news
- Product testing
- Reports from Archery GB's Chief Executive and Chairman
- Archery rankings, both national and regional
- The latest news from the Archery GB board, judges, coaches
- Tournament Diary and national tournament dates
- Achievements and records
- Letters from readers
- Directory of Contacts
