= Glossary of archery terms =

List of definitions of terms and concepts related to archery

This is a list of archery terms, including both the equipment and the practice. A brief description for each word or phrase is also included.

== 0–9 ==
- 3D Archery (practice) – A type of field archery in which the targets are 3-dimensional representations of animals. Also rendered as "3-D".

== A ==
- anchor point – A point to be touched by the draw hand or string when the bow is fully drawn and ready to shoot, usually a point on the archer's mouth, chin, jaw, or nose
- AMO (organization) – The Archery Manufacturers and Merchants Organization (now known as the Archery Trade Association, or ATA)
- AMO length (measure) – A standardized length for measuring bow strings
- arbalest – A late variation of the crossbow that came into use in Europe during the 12th century
- archer (practitioner) – One who practices archery (a.k.a. bowman)
- archer's paradox (effect) – The effect produced by an arrow flexing as it leaves the bow
- archery (practice) – The practice of using a bow to shoot arrows
- arm guard (equipment) – A protective strap or sheath for an archer's forearm (a.k.a. bracer)
- arrow (equipment) – A shafted projectile that is shot with a bow
- arrowhead (equipment) – The front end of an arrow; also known as the head, point or tip
- arrow rest (equipment) – A device used to hold an arrow against a handle until it is released
- ASA (organization) – Archery Shooters Association, a US body that sanctions 3D archery competitions.
- ATA (organization) – The Archery Trade Association (formerly known as the Archery Manufacturers and Merchants Organization, or AMO)
- A.T.A. (measure) – Initialism for axle-to-axle, the length between the two pivotal axles which hold the cams onto the limbs on a compound bow

== B ==
- back bar (equipment)
1. A connector attached to a bow's riser to allow a rear stabilizer to be attached.
2. An alternate term for "siderod".
- back tension release (equipment) – see "hinge release"
- back wall – The point of a compound bow's draw cycle beyond which the bow cannot be drawn.
- barebow
  - (equipment) – A bow with no accessories attached.
  - (discipline) – A competitive archery discipline in which allowed bow accessories are severely limited. For example, in World Archery competitions, sights, draw check devices, and stabilizers are banned; arrow rests are allowed with restrictions on size and placement; and vibration dampeners and weights are allowed if directly attached to the bow. Additionally, the entire unstrung bow, with permitted accessories, must be able to pass through a ring 12.2 cm in diameter.
- Berger hole (equipment) – A threaded hole on the riser of a compound bow through.which a bolt that secures an arrow rest is attached.
- bleeder blade (equipment) – Secondary blades on a broadhead that are smaller than the primary cutting blades, included to provide a larger cutting surface. Often called simply a "bleeder".
- bodkin point (equipment) – A sharp, pointed arrow head
- bolt (equipment) – A crossbow projectile; also called a quarrel
- boss (equipment) – A target, typically made from tightly compacted foam or straw
- bowman (practitioner) – One who practices archery (a.k.a. archer)
- bow (equipment) – An ancient weapon powered by elasticity, used for hunting and sport
- bow press (equipment) – A mechanical press which flexes the limbs of a compound bow, taking tension off the string and cable(s) to allow bow maintenance.
- bow square (equipment) – A specialized T-square with measuring marks that clips onto the bow string, used to set nocking points for all bows and setting the brace height of recurve bows.
- bowfishing (practice) – The use of archery equipment for catching fish.
- bowhunter (discipline) – A competition class in target and field archery mainly used by U.S.-based governing bodies; known in some bodies as the "hunter" class. Rules regarding equipment vary by governing body, but all are intended to ensure that competitors' equipment is broadly similar to that used in hunting.
- bowhunting (practice) – The practice of hunting game using archery.
- bowstring (equipment) – A fiber joining two ends of a bow for launching arrows. Can be rendered as two words ("bow string").
- bowyer (craftsman) – One who makes bows
- bracing (practice) – The act of attaching a bow string to a bow.
- brace height (measure) – The distance from the string to the pivot point of the bow's grip.
- bracer (equipment) – A protective strap or sheath for an archer's forearm (a.k.a. arm guard)
- broadhead (equipment) – A sharp-bladed hunting head
- bullseye (equipment) – The central area of a target, often for which a greater number of points may be scored when hit
- button (equipment) – An adjustable spring-loaded contact for the arrow as it sits on the rest, mounted perpendicular to the arrow
- button release (equipment) – see "thumb release"
- butts (location) – A practice field with mounds of earth used as targets

== C ==
- CAA (organization) – Camp Archery Association, provides camps and other selected institutions with archery pins, patches, and cards to measure performance in archery.
- cable (equipment)
  - A length of fiber attached to the back of a traditional bow for reinforcement. See cable-backed bow.
  - A length of string material connecting the cams of a compound bow.
- cable-driven rest (equipment) – A drop-away rest that is mechanically linked to a compound bow's cable.
- cam (equipment) – A rotating piece of mechanical linkage in a compound bow that converts rotary motion into linear motion.
- clarifier (equipment) – A lens attached to the peep sight, coupled with a lens attached to the sight housing; the combination provides a clearer view of the target. Contrast with verifier.
- clicker (equipment)
1. A device on a recurve bow used to indicate an archer's optimum draw length.
2. A device on a release aid to indicate when the release is ready to fire.
- clout – The centre of a target.
- clout archery (practice) – A form of archery in which archers shoot arrows toward a flag (known as the clout) from a relatively long distance and are scored based on how close each arrow lands to the flag
- cock feather (equipment) – A differently-colored fletch that indicates proper arrow alignment on the string (a.k.a. index feather)
- composite bow (equipment) – A bow made from various laminated materials
- compound bow (equipment) – A modern bow that uses a system of cables and pulleys.
- containment rest (equipment) – An arrow rest that holds the arrow in place with multiple points of contact.
- crest (equipment) – Heraldic markings on an arrow used for identification or design
- crossbow (equipment) – A bow mounted on a stock, which shoots projectiles called bolts or quarrels
- crown (equipment) – The nock end of an arrow where cresting and paints are applied

== D ==
- D-loop (equipment) – A length of string (or sometimes a metal bracket) connected to the bowstring above and below the nocking point, allowing the archer to connect a release aid to the string while avoiding interference with the arrow.
- daikyu (equipment) – A Japanese longbow
- decurve bow (equipment) – A form of bow in which the unstrung tips curve toward the archer
- deflex bow (equipment) – A form of bow in which the entire length of the handle and limbs curve toward the archer
- draw board (equipment) – A mechanical device that allows a compound bow's complete draw cycle to be observed.
- draw length (measure) – Archer: individual measure. At full draw the distance in inches from nock point on bow string to deepest grip spot (pivot-point) plus 1 3/4 inches (44 mm) (ATA standard). Bow: characteristic measure of the bow together with its draw weight. The technically given optimal draw length for full draw of that bow (ATA standard). Draw weight of a bow means weight at its draw length.
- draw weight (measure) – The number of units of force required to draw a bow to its draw length. Often expressed in pounds even in metricated countries,
- drawing (practice) – The act of pulling the string that is attached to the bow
- drop-away rest (equipment) – An arrow rest for compound bows that is designed to hold the arrow in place when the archer is at full draw, but drop down once the arrow is released.
- dry loosing (practice) – Refers to the loosing of the string of a bow without an arrow on the nock, potentially damaging the bow

== E ==
- end (practice) – A round of arrows shot during an archery event (rarely more than six)
- English longbow (equipment) – A powerful medieval bow; also known as the Welsh longbow

== F ==
- feather (equipment) – An arrow vane made from an actual feather; contrast with the modern usage of "vane" to refer solely to stabilizing fins made from synthetic materials.
- field archery (practice) – Shooting at targets of unmarked distances in an open field
- field tip (equipment) – A practice head for targets. Alternately a "field point".
- finger tab (equipment) – A small leather patch to protect the archer's fingers
- fistmele (measure) – The proper distance between the handle of a bow and the bow string when the bow is strung (a.k.a. brace height)
- fixed-blade broadhead (equipment) – A hunting broadhead with blades attached to its ferrule, with the edges fully visible from the outside. Alternately a "fixed broadhead". Depending on the design, the blades can be permanently attached or replaceable.
- flatbow (equipment) – A non-recurved bow with a rectangular cross section
- fletching (equipment) – The stabilizing fins or vanes of an arrow
- fletcher (craftsman) – One who makes arrows
- flex (measure) – The amount of bend an arrow shaft provides; contrasted with spine
- flu-flu arrow (equipment) – A specially designed short-range arrow
- FOC (measure) – Abbreviation of "front of center" or "forward of center", with the letters spelled out. An indirect measure of the portion of the arrow's mass in the front half (the head end). Expressed as a percentage, calculated by determining the difference between the finished arrow's balance point (including the head, insert/outsert, fletching, and nock) and the shaft's center point, and then dividing it by the total shaft length (measured from the bottom of the nock groove to the end of the shaft).
- footed arrow (equipment) – An arrow with a shaft composed of two types of wood.

== G ==
- gungdo (practice) – The Korean practice of archery

== H ==
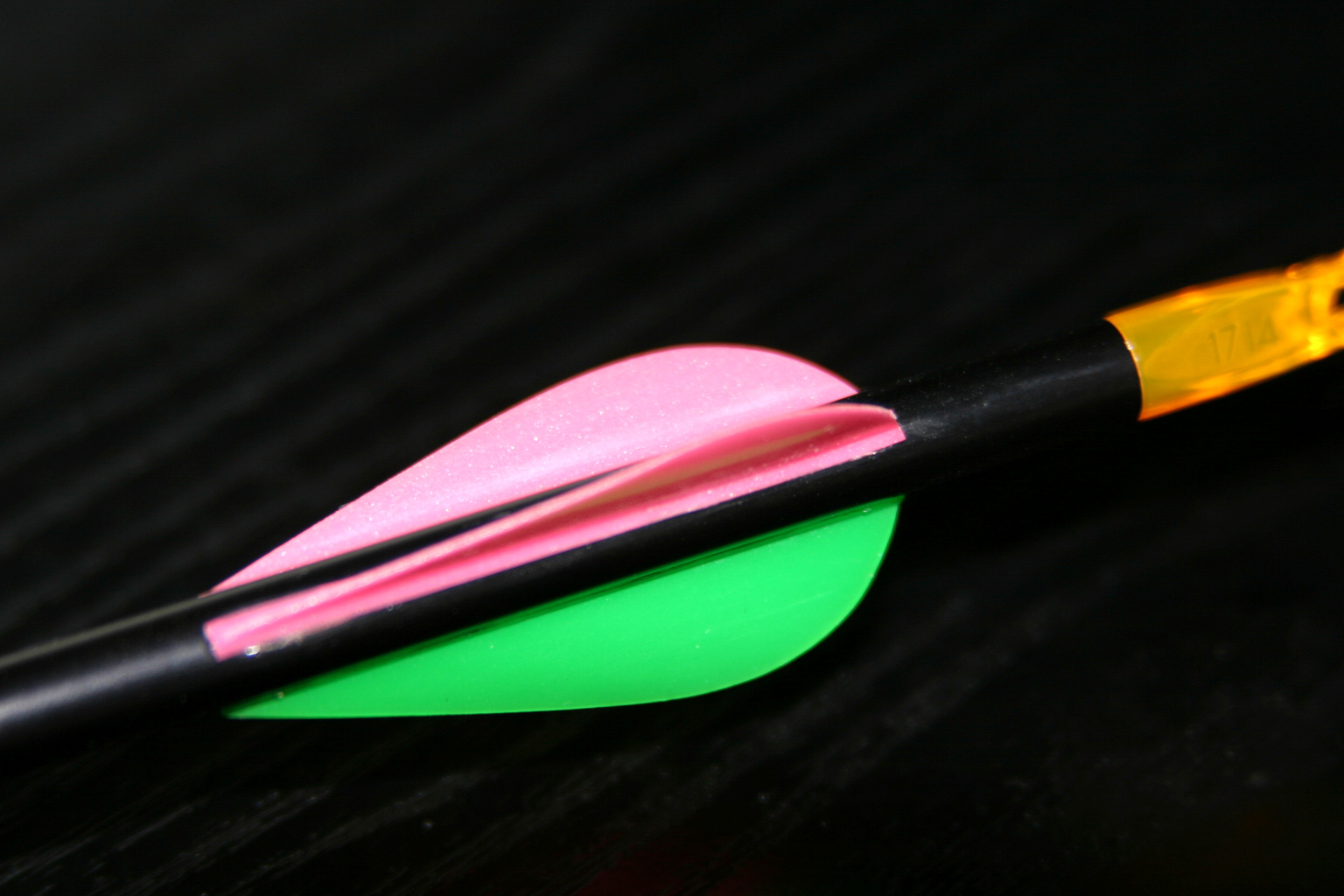
Fletching showing index feather (a.k.a. cock feather – green) and hen feathers (pink)

- half-out (equipment) – A type of arrow insert placed inside an arrow shaft, but with a portion extending beyond the end of the shaft by more than a nominal amount. Most often chosen to allow standard-threaded heads to be used with small-diameter shafts.
- hankyu (equipment) – A short Japanese bow
- head (equipment) – The front end of an arrow; also known as the arrowhead, point or tip
- helical fletching (description) – Description of a fletch placed so that it forms an arc with respect to the arrow's center axis. Can additionally be described as "left" or "right" helical, indicating the direction of the arc as one travels down the fletch toward the arrow point, and by the number of degrees offset from the axis of symmetry.
- hen feather (equipment) – Name given to the shaft feathers based on misunderstanding of cock (leading) feather
- hinge release (equipment) – A release aid that fires by rotation, usually from the archer's middle finger to the ring finger. Also known as a "back tension" release, as the needed rotation is often supplied by moving the back muscles in the desired direction.
- holding weight (measure) – The number of units of force required to hold a compound bow at full draw. See also let-off.
- horse archer (practitioner) – An archer mounted on a horse
- horse archery (practice) – Archery mounted on a horse
- hybrid (equipment)
  - A term to describe the combination of a recurve and a longbow, also known as "reflex-deflex".
  - A term to describe a hunting broadhead with both fixed and mechanically opening blades.

== I ==
- IBO – International Bowhunting Organization, an American organization that promotes bowhunting and sanctions 3-D archery competitions. Also the creator of the most widely used standard for measuring bow speeds.
- index fletching (equipment) – A differently-colored fletch that indicates proper arrow alignment (a.k.a. cock fletching)
- index release (equipment) – A release aid that fires when the archer activates a trigger with (usually) the index finger.
- insert (equipment) – A metal sleeve fitted to and glued inside an arrow shaft. Most often refers to sleeves placed at the point end of the shaft, threaded to allow arrowheads to be screwed in. Can also refer to sleeves placed at the fletching end to add weight or allow certain nock types to be installed. Contrast with outsert.
- Instinctive shooting (practice) also known as intuitive shooting, is a method used in archery to shoot an arrow by exploiting the brain's ability to analyze, without our realizing it, the three-dimensional space between us and the target, focusing solely on the target.

== J ==
- judo point (equipment) – A target and small-game head equipped with spring wires for easy location

== K ==
- kisser (equipment) – A button used to indicate consistent vertical distance when drawing a bow
- kyūdō (practice) – The Japanese practice of archery

== L ==
- launcher (equipment)
1. A type of arrow rest that has a prong or blade that supports the arrow for the entire draw cycle and shot.
2. The prong or blade of a drop-away rest that supports the arrow when the bow is at full draw, and drops down as the arrow is released.
- let-off (measure) – The difference between a compound bow's holding weight and draw weight. Expressed as a percentage of the draw weight; for example, a bow with a draw weight of 70 lb and holding weight of 14 lb would have 80% let-off.
- limb-driven rest (equipment) – A drop-away rest that is mechanically linked to one of a compound bow's limbs.
- Longbow - A type of bow that is usually used for long shots
- loose (practice) – The act of shooting an arrow from a bow (a.k.a. release)
- laminated bow (equipment) – A bow with different materials laminated together to make a single bow
- limbs (equipment) – The upper and lower arms of a bow
- longrod (equipment) – Rod attached to the bow to dampen vibrations

== M ==
- majra (equipment) – An overdraw device used in Turkish archery
- mechanical broadhead (equipment) – A hunting broadhead whose blades are designed to open by contact with the target.
- mounted archer (practitioner) – An archer mounted on a horse
- mounted archery (practice) – Archery while mounted on a horse
- Mongolian draw (practice) – The act of drawing a bow with the thumb

== N ==
- NASP (organization) – Initialism for the National Archery in the Schools Program, a youth archery program founded and based in the U.S. but also operating in several other countries.
- nock (equipment) – The notch at the rear end of an arrow; also the notches at the ends of the bow limbs to which the bowstring is attached, or looped over
- nock (practice) – The act of setting an arrow in a bow
- nocking point (equipment) – The point on a bow string over which an arrow nock is placed

== O ==
- offset fletching (description) – Description of a fletch placed at an angle with respect to the arrow's center axis, but along as straight a line as the curvature of the arrow allows. Contrast with helical fletching.
- outsert (equipment) – A metal sleeve fitted to and glued on the outside of an arrow shaft, for the same purposes as an insert.
- overdraw (practice) – The use of a device, e.g. a siper, to allow the shooting of arrows shorter than the draw of the bow
- overdrawn (measure) – A condition in which a bow string is too short for the bow; fistmele is exceeded

== P ==
- pin (equipment) – Short for "sight pin"; a small fiber-optic pin, attached to a sight housing by a narrow metal or plastic bar, used to align the bow with the target.
- plunger or pressure button (equipment) – A device used to correct an arrow's flex at the point of release
- point (equipment) – The front end of an arrow; also known as the arrowhead, head or tip

== Q ==
- quarrel (equipment) – A crossbow projectile; also called a bolt
- quiver (equipment) – A container for an archer's projectiles (arrows)

== R ==
- recurve bow (equipment) – A form of bow in which the unstrung tips curve away from the archer
- reflex bow (equipment) – A form of bow in which the entire length of the handle and arms curve away from the archer
- release (practice) – The act of relaxing the fingers of the drawing hand (see Bow draw) to free an arrow from a bow (a.k.a. loose)
- release aid (equipment) — A small handheld object that can be clipped to a bowstring and releases when a trigger is pressed, or upon a certain physical action. Often called simply a "release".
- rest (equipment) – A device used to hold the arrow against the handle until it is released
- resistance release (equipment) – A release aid that fires once the archer applies a previously set amount of resistance to the bow's back wall. This type of release includes a safety that the archer holds down during drawing and releases at full draw.
- riser (equipment) – The handle section of a bow
- Robin Hood
  - (verb) – Slang term for splitting an arrow embedded in a target with another arrow.
  - (noun) – Slang term for the above action, or for an arrow involved in that action.
- run archery (practice) – Shooting discipline connecting archery with running

== S ==
- safety arrow (equipment) – An arrow with a wide tip or padded head, often used for reenactments
- scope (equipment) – A sight housing that resembles a scope, containing one or more pins used to align the bow with the target. Some housings, mainly used in target archery and often sold separately from the rest of the sight, can accept lenses (see clarifier).
- self bow (equipment) – A bow made from a single piece of material (normally wood)
- serving (equipment) – Extra thread wound around a bow string, or a compound bow cable, in order to support or protect the main fiber.
- shaft (equipment) – The main structural element of an arrow
- shaftment (equipment) – Part of the arrow upon which the fletchings lie
- shaft feathers (equipment) – The two feathers which oppose the cock feather
- shedao (practice) – The Chinese and Taiwanese practice of archery
- shooting glove (equipment) – Protective gear for an archer's fingers
- siderod (equipment) – A stabilizer mounted to point toward the rear of the bow, positioned slightly to one side of the bow; sometimes called a back bar, though that term is also used for the siderod mount. Almost always paired with a stabilizer that points in the direction of the arrow.
- siper (equipment) – An overdraw device used in Turkish archery
- sling (equipment) – A loop of material attached to a bow's riser, typically at or near the bottom of the grip, into which the archer inserts the bow hand.
- spine (measure) – The stiffness of an arrow shaft; contrasted with flex
- stabiliser or stabilizer (equipment) – A weighted rod or set of rods used to provide balance to a bow
- stave (equipment) – A strip of wood from which a bow may be made
- straight fletching (description) – Description of a fletch placed directly along an arrow's axis of symmetry.
- string (action) – The action of putting the bow in tension.
- string stop (equipment) – A rod attached to the back of the bow, with a rubber stopper on the end nearest the string. During a shot, the string will impact the stopper, dampening vibration.

== T ==
- tab (equipment) – A small leather patch to protect the archer's fingers
- TAC (event) – Acronym for Total Archery Challenge, a non-competitive 3D archery event held at several locations in the United States.
- target archery (practice) – Shooting at non-moving targets placed varying distances away
- target panic (condition) – Set of symptoms developed for psychological reasons resulting in lowered accuracy
- target point (equipment) – Bullet-shaped practice head, used for targets
- target shooting (practice) – Competitive event that uses projectile weapons for tests of proficiency
- thumb release (equipment) – A release aid that fires when the archer activates a trigger with the thumb. Also called a "thumb button" or "button release".
- thumb ring (equipment) – Protective ring for an archer's thumb.
- tip (equipment) – Either (especially the top) end of the bow, as differentiated from the point of an arrow.
- tong-ah (equipment) – An overdraw device used in traditional Korean archery, similar to the Turkish majra.
- Traditional bow (equipment) – is a division that includes some types of bow defined by the international regulation.

== U ==
- upshot – The last shot in an archery contest

== V ==
- V-bar (equipment) – A stabilizer mount with dedicated connections for two stabilizers. Term comes from the frequent (but not exclusive) use of such a mount to attach two stabilizers at the rear of a bow.
- vane (equipment) – The stabilizing fin of an arrow. In modern usage, usually refers to a fin made from a synthetic material, as opposed to one made from an actual feather.
- verifier (equipment) – A lens attached to a peep housing, used to provide a clearer view of the sight pin(s). Contrast with clarifier.

== W ==
- wand shoot (practice) – An archery event in which arrows are shot at a slat of soft wood that is typically six feet tall and two inches wide
- Welsh longbow (equipment) – A powerful medieval bow; also known as an English longbow
- wrap (equipment) – A piece of adhesive-backed plastic film wrapped around an arrow slightly ahead of the nock. Some archers choose to attach wraps before fletching arrows in order to protect the shaft from the adhesives used for fletching, which may be more harmful to shafts than those used in the wraps. Also used for personalization and improved arrow visibility.

== X ==
- X ring (equipment) – In some competitions, a smaller target ring at the center of the bullseye which (depending on the competition rules) will award the highest possible score, or be used as a tiebreaker. For example, in The Vegas Shoot, a well-known American target archery competition, the highest possible score in the 90-arrow championship qualifying round would be "900/90X", representing all 90 arrows hitting the X ring.

== Y ==
- ya (equipment) – An asymmetric Japanese arrow
- yabusame (practice) – A type of mounted archery practiced in Japan
- yew (material) – A type of wood traditionally used to make bows
- yumi (equipment) – An asymmetric Japanese bow; includes both long and short varieties (daikyu and hankyu)

== See also ==
- Archery games
- Field archery
- History of archery
