= Release aid =

Archery device

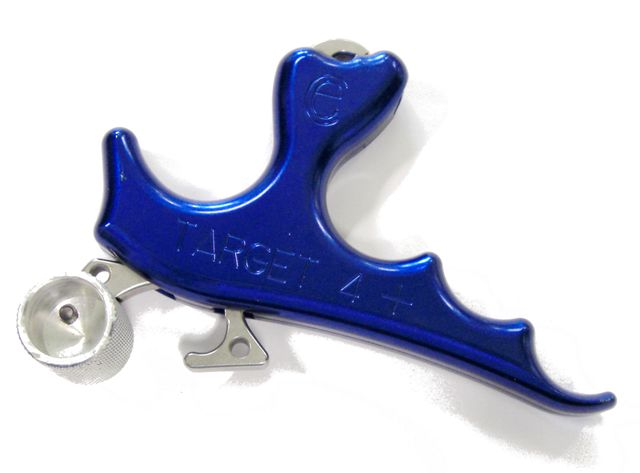
Carter Release Target 4

In archery, a release aid, mechanical release, or release is a device that helps to fire arrows more precisely, by using a trigger to release the bowstring, rather than the archer's fingers. It is used to make the release of the bowstring quicker and reducing the amount of torque put onto the bowstring from the archer's fingers.

== Use ==
Archers using compound bows most commonly use a release aid to hold the string and release it precisely, although finger tabs are also popular with compound bows, especially among older archers who have used finger tabs when shooting recurve bows. The release aid attaches to the bowstring just below the nocking point or at the D loop and permits the archer to release the string by the use of some form of trigger. When such a device was first invented (patent filed in USA, 1879) it was known as a "clutch". The trigger may be an actual trigger lever which is depressed by a finger or thumb (positive), or held and then released (negative); there are numerous types. Hydraulic and mechanical time delay triggers have been used, as have "back tension" triggers which are operated by either a change in the position of the release or "true back tension"; the release triggers when a pre-determined draw weight is reached.

A mechanical release permits a single point of contact on the string instead of three fingers as most commonly used with finger tabs. This allows less deformity in the string at full draw, as well as providing a more consistent release. This is primarily because the most successful types operate with positive pressure, whereas the conventional 'fingers' release is negative pressure. Some archers prefer three fingers under the arrow with a finger tab, whereas the split-finger approach, having one finger above the arrow and two fingers below the arrow is the most commonly used finger shooting method amongst English and modern North American archers, who do not use mechanical release aids.

The mechanical release retains the string by a gate or loop of cord. The gate or cord is released by operation of the trigger, allowing the string to push open the gate or cord. Consequently, any sideways movement of the string, and hence arrow nock, is likely to be less than if fingers were used, although, if a consistent finger tab release is performed, the differences are often negligible in terms of practical hunting accuracy at ranges up to 30 yards.

== Advantages ==
The first advantage of using a release aid is the drastic decrease in chance of dry firing a compound bow. Doing this runs the risk of damaging the bow, and can result in the injury of the user.

Using a release aid can also make it easier to group arrows tighter together, due to a consistent release that is put on the bowstring every time, rather than using finger muscles to hold back the weight of the bow, which makes the release of the bowstring harder to replicate consistently. This is true not only under high pressure situations, but also in any regular practice.

If used with a wrist strap, the release allows one to pull the draw weight of the bow with the arm muscles instead of all the tension being put on the fingers.

Lastly, many modern compound bows are designed to be shot using a release aid. They are designed with solid limb stops and fine planes of motion. This increases the chance of the bow string "jumping" off the cams if a release aid is not used.

== Disadvantages ==
As any mechanical device, it can and will break eventually. An archer who does not have an extra release may end up shooting with their fingers, which changes draw length and accuracy.

== Styles ==
Wrist triggers are the most popular releases, used mostly by hunters and casual recreational shooters. These are the easiest releases to use because of the familiarity most people have with pulling a trigger. These releases consist of a thick wrist band and a rod with the mechanism at the end of it. They are popular with hunters mainly because the wristband lessens the chance of it falling from a tree stand.

T-handled releases are hand-held releases that rely on the strength of one's fingers. The release is held in the fist, with the mechanism usually poking out between index and middle finger. A handled release uses one of two different styles of a mechanism either by using a back tension or a thumb switch. These styles of releases are most popular with tournament archers and sometimes in tree stands.

== Mechanisms ==
Caliper style releases are most popular with the wrist trigger style of releases, due to the fact that the trigger mechanism near the head of the release makes it simple to actuate the caliper open and closed in an efficient manner. With only one or a few moving parts, this release is simple and dependable.

Thumb switch release aids are the most complicated, with the most moving parts of the three most common releases. They work on the depression of a thumb switch that is mounted to a T-handle's style of release. The attraction to these release aids are that they are a good midpoint between a caliper and back tension style of release aids, making the transition from one to the other a little smoother over a longer period of time.

Back tension release aids, also known as hinge releases, are the simplest mechanically, with only one moving part. However, as a result of this, they are the hardest style of release to learn how to use. The aid relies on the muscle tension through the forearms and back in order to release the latch at the end of the T-handle's leg. These releases are known for their accuracy and dependability on the tournament archery scene. They depend on the fulcrum of a lever over a half-moon-shaped piece of metal in order for the release to go off.

Resistance releases, also known as tension releases, are similar to back tension/hinge releases, but are activated by applying a set amount of resistance to the back wall at full draw. This type of release has a built-in safety mechanism that the archer activates while drawing and releases when at full draw, at that point applying the needed resistance to execute the shot.

== Attachment ==
A D loop is the most popular way of attaching your release to the bowstring because it causes the least torque on the bowstring itself. It consists of a small-diameter piece of nylon cord tied to the string of the bow, using two reverse facing half hitch knots. It is named for the resulting "D" shape.

Under nock is when one directly attaches the release to the bowstring under the bottom of the nock of the arrow. This is popular with older archers who have not yet adopted the D loop. This style of attachment puts the most stress not only on the bow but also on the arrow itself on top on the release mechanism.

== Alternatives ==
In Arab archery as in Central Asia and the Middle East, thumb rings are commonly used as finger protection in thumb draw techniques. A 2021 world archery interpretation restricts the use of thumb rings in WA-regulated competitions to the compound division in order to avoid adding a new division to the sport and because thumb rings "can easily be turned into release aids". The arrow must be positioned on the other side of the bow (on the right hand side of the bow for a right-handed shooter) to properly use a thumb ring, to allow the arrow to flex properly, since the thumb opens in the opposite direction to the fingers.

The choice of a mechanical release aid versus a finger tab must be accounted for in a compound bow's tuning and sighting, as finger-released arrows will group in a different spot when using a mechanical release aid versus a finger tab. Likewise, the choice of arrow rest for a compound bow depends on whether a finger release archery tab or mechanical release aid is used. For a finger-released arrow, a plunger pin is most commonly used as the arrow rest, to impart a tuned impulse laterally to the arrow at the moment of release to improve point-of-impact groupings. In contrast, for a release aid configuration, a full-containment arrow rest, with Whisker Biscuit the best-known brand of this type, is very commonly used with a compound bow.
