= Worshipful Company of Bowyers =

Livery company of the City of London

- Motto: Crecy, Poitiers, Agincourt
- Company association: Longbow-makers
- Order of precedence: 38th
- Master of company: Sir David Wootton
- Website: bowyers.com

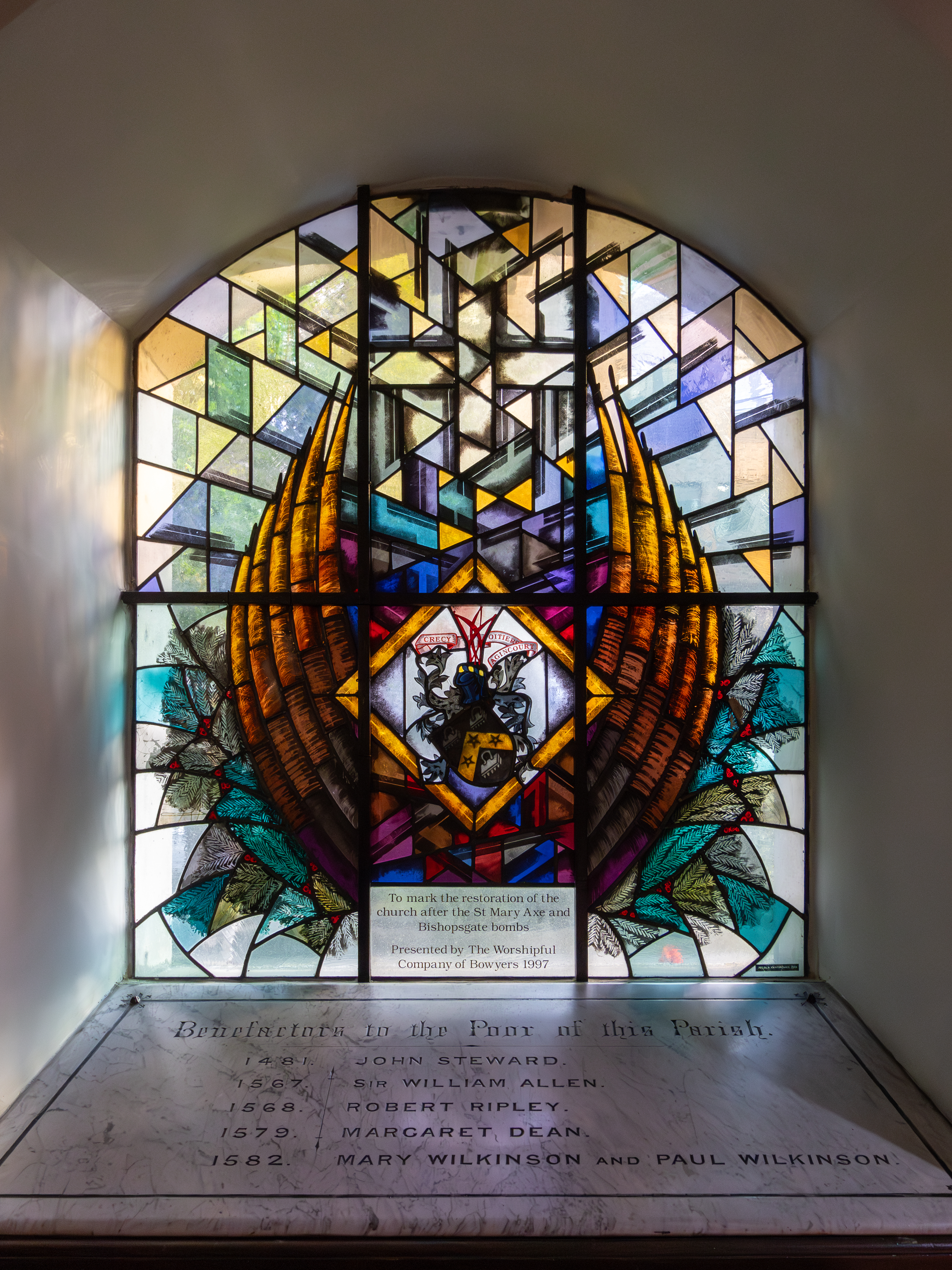
Window in St Botolph-without-Bishopsgate church donated by the Worshipful Company of Bowyers, showing their coat of arms

The Worshipful Company of Bowyers is one of the livery companies of the City of London.

Originally, bowyers (longbow-makers) and fletchers (arrow-makers) composed one organisation. However, in 1371, the fletchers petitioned the lord mayor to divide into their own company, the Worshipful Company of Fletchers. Demarcation disputes arose between the two over supervision until 1429, when a City ordinance defined their respective spheres. It was not until the late 1480s that the bowyers acquired a coat of arms and a set of coherent written ordinances.

The actual trade of the bowyers still survives. Although originally made for use in war and hunting, there is now some demand for longbows used in target archery. There are several practising bowyers in the membership of the company and it maintains a great interest in the craft. The bowyers are also involved in the sport of archery and give awards and medals each year at the Royal Toxophilite Society and school competitions.

The Bowyers' Company mostly exists as a charitable institution, as do a majority of the 113 livery companies, with a focus on giving to charities where it can make some difference. The Bowyers rank 38th in the order of precedence of the companies, immediately above the Worshipful Company of Fletchers. Uniquely, among all the city's livery companies, companies without livery and guilds, it is the only company with a two-year officer and mastership cycle going back to at least 1488.

The company motto is Crecy, Poitiers, Agincourt, a reference to the Battle of Crécy, the Battle of Poitiers, and the Battle of Agincourt, all battles between medieval England and France in the Hundred Years' War in which longbows and English longbows were used to great effect by English and Welsh archers, before artillery took over towards the end of the war. The coat of arms contains three flotes, tools traditionally used for smoothing and shaping wood.
