= Arrow paradox (disambiguation) =

Arrow paradox, referring to an arrow (missile), may mean:

- One of Zeno's paradoxes about the impossibility of motion

From the surname Arrow, it may mean:

- Kenneth Arrow's impossibility theorem about social choice and voting
- Arrow information paradox: "its value for the purchaser is not known until he has the information, but then he has in effect acquired it without cost"

== See also ==
- Archer's paradox
