= Arbalest =

Form of medieval crossbow

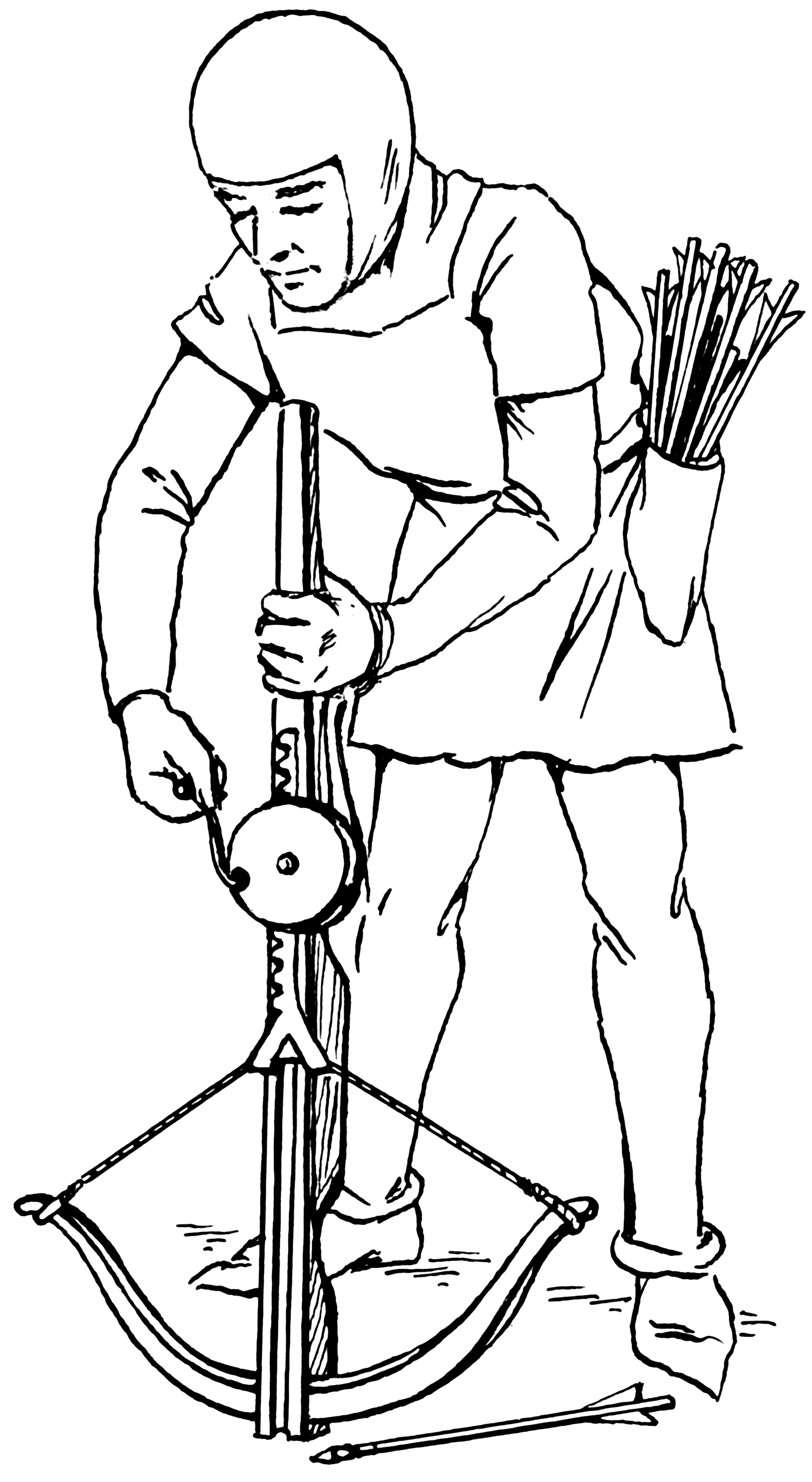
Crossbowman cocking an arbalest using a cranequin

The arbalest (also arblast), a variation of the crossbow, came into use in Europe around the 12th century. The arbalest was a large weapon with a steel prod, or bow assembly. Since the arbalest was much larger than earlier crossbows, and because of the greater tensile strength of steel, it had a greater force. The greater draw weight was offset by a shorter draw length, which limited the total potential energy that could be transferred into the crossbow bolt. A skilled arbalestier (arbalester) could loose two bolts per minute.

== Nomenclature ==
The term "arbalest" is sometimes used interchangeably with "crossbow". Arbalest is a Medieval French word originating from the Roman name arcuballista (from arcus 'bow' + ballista 'missile-throwing engine'), which was then used for crossbows, although originally used for types of artillery.

Modern French uses the word arbalète, which is linguistically one step further from the stem, due to the disappearance of the s phoneme in the last syllable. This form of the word applies to both crossbows and arbalests (the latter may be referred to as a heavy crossbow, but an actual heavy crossbow may not be the same as an arbalest).

== Bibliography ==
- Tanner, Norman P. (1990). Decrees of the Ecumenical Councils. Vol. 1. London / Washington, D.C.: Sheed & Ward. Georgetown University Press. ISBN 0-87840-490-2. "Nicaea 1 to Lateran V".
- Bellamy, Alex J. (2006). Just Wars: From Cicero to Iraq. Wiley. p. 32. ISBN 0-7456-3282-3.
