= Worshipful Company of Fletchers =

Livery company of the City of London

- Arms of the Worshipful Company of Fletchers
- Motto: True and Sure
- Location: City of London
- Date of formation: 1371
- Company association: arrow-makers
- Order of precedence: 39th
- Website: http://www.fletchers.org.uk

The Worshipful Company of Fletchers is one of the livery companies of the City of London.

Originally, one organisation included both bowyers (longbow-makers) and fletchers (arrow-makers). However, in 1371, the fletchers petitioned the Lord Mayor to divide into their own Company, leaving the bowyers to form the Worshipful Company of Bowyers.

The trade of fletchers, considering the development of more technologically advanced weapons, has disappeared entirely. The Company still remains, however, primarily as a charitable institution, as do a majority of the 110 Livery Companies.

The Fletchers' Company ranks 39th in the order of precedence of the Livery Companies, immediately below the bowyers. Its motto is True and Sure.
