= Flu-flu arrow =

Archery Equipment

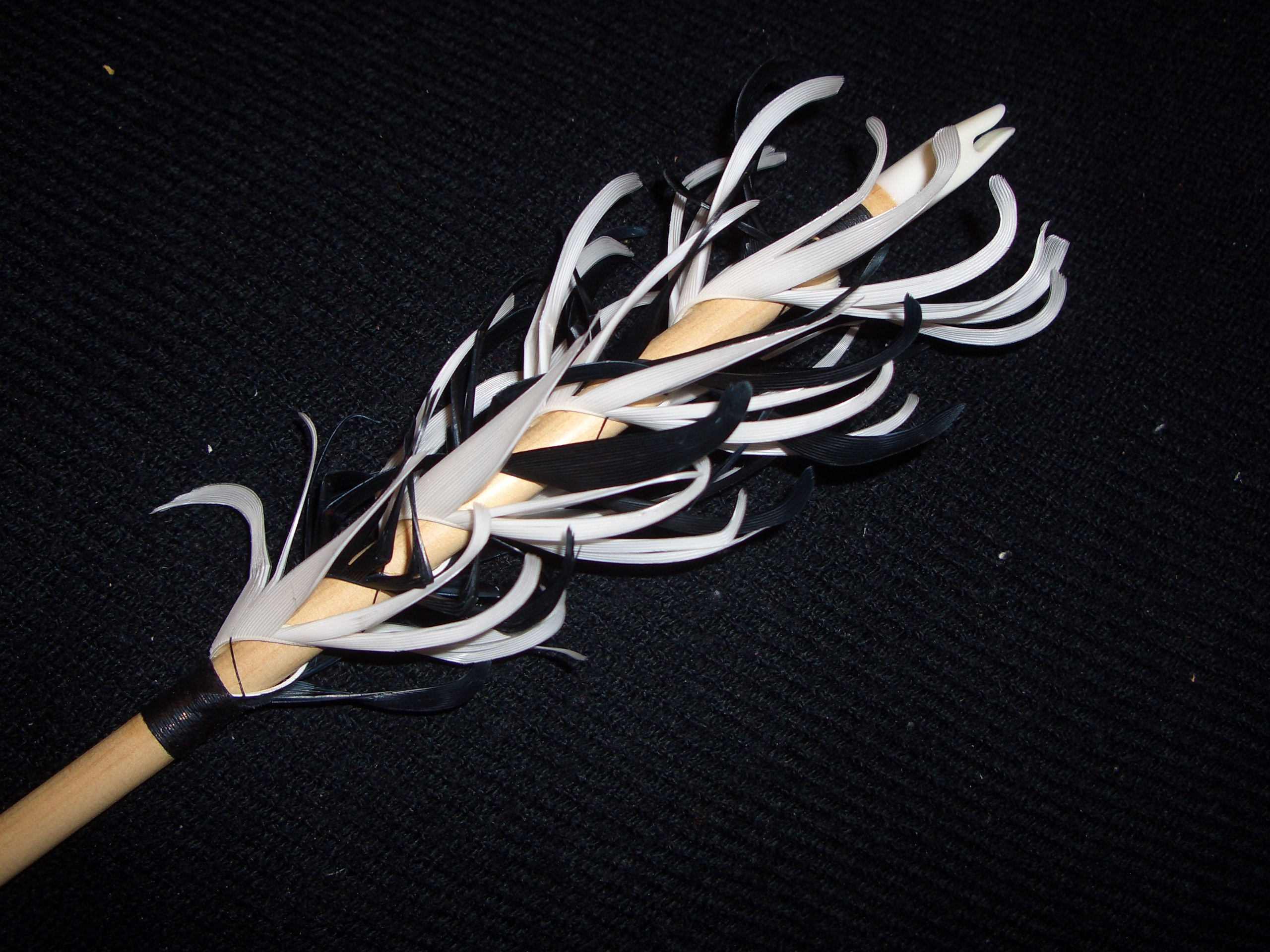
Flu-flu fletching

A flu-flu arrow is a type of arrow specifically designed to travel a short distance. Such arrows are particularly useful when shooting at aerial targets or for certain types of recreational archery where the arrow must not travel too far. One of the main uses of these arrows is that they do not get lost as easily if they miss the target.

Flu-flu arrows have a distinctive design of fletching, normally made by using long sections of feathers; in most cases six or more sections are used, rather than the traditional three. Alternatively, two long feathers can be spiraled around the end of the arrow shaft. In either case, the excessive fletching serves to generate more drag and slow the arrow down rapidly after a short distance of about 30 m (98 ft). Recreational flu-flus usually have rubber points to add weight and keep the flight slower.

== Uses ==
Flu-flu arrows were and still are used to hunt birds. When taking aim at the bird the archer must lead the bird and release the arrow in anticipation of the bird's travel path. Because flu-flu arrows fly short distances, it is easy for the archer to recover the arrow if the target is missed. Special bird points are used that entangle the bird as it flies into a wire harness attached to the end of the arrow.

These arrows often have a blunt point. If shooting at squirrels or other tree dwellers, the blunt point will prevent the arrow from sticking in the branch or trunk of the tree, making it easier to retrieve. The blunt points were also used for other reasons. "Although the first game preserves in England were established by William the Conqueror at this time, the Saxon was permitted to shoot birds and small beasts in his fields and therefore was allowed to use a blunt arrow, headed with a lead tip or pilum, hence our term pile, or target point. If found with a sharp arrowhead, the so-called broad-head used for killing the king's deer, he was promptly hanged."

Another author said: "After shooting with bows and arrows for a short time, the archer no doubt will marvel at the way an arrow can lose itself in even the shortest grass and how a pointed arrow can bury itself about 2.5 cm (0.98 in) or so into a tree trunk or branch so that it takes a half-hour or more to dig it out. For this kind of shooting, blunt arrows cannot be beat. These blunt arrows have tremendous hitting power. They do not sneak under the grass as easily as do other arrows, but the chances of getting a rabbit with a blunt arrow are much better than with a hunting point. These blunt arrows will stand a lot of hard knocks too."

Flu-flu arrows are often used for children's archery, and can be used to play flu-flu golf. Similar to disc golf, the player must go to where the arrow landed, pick it up, shoot it again, and repeat this process until they reach a specified place.
