= Flote =

A flote is a woodworking tool used in the art of bowyery. Flotes are specialized, traditional hand tools that are used to shape the bow during the process of tillering. Flotes appear on the arms of the Worshipful Company of Bowyers.
