= Combat archery =

Team sport

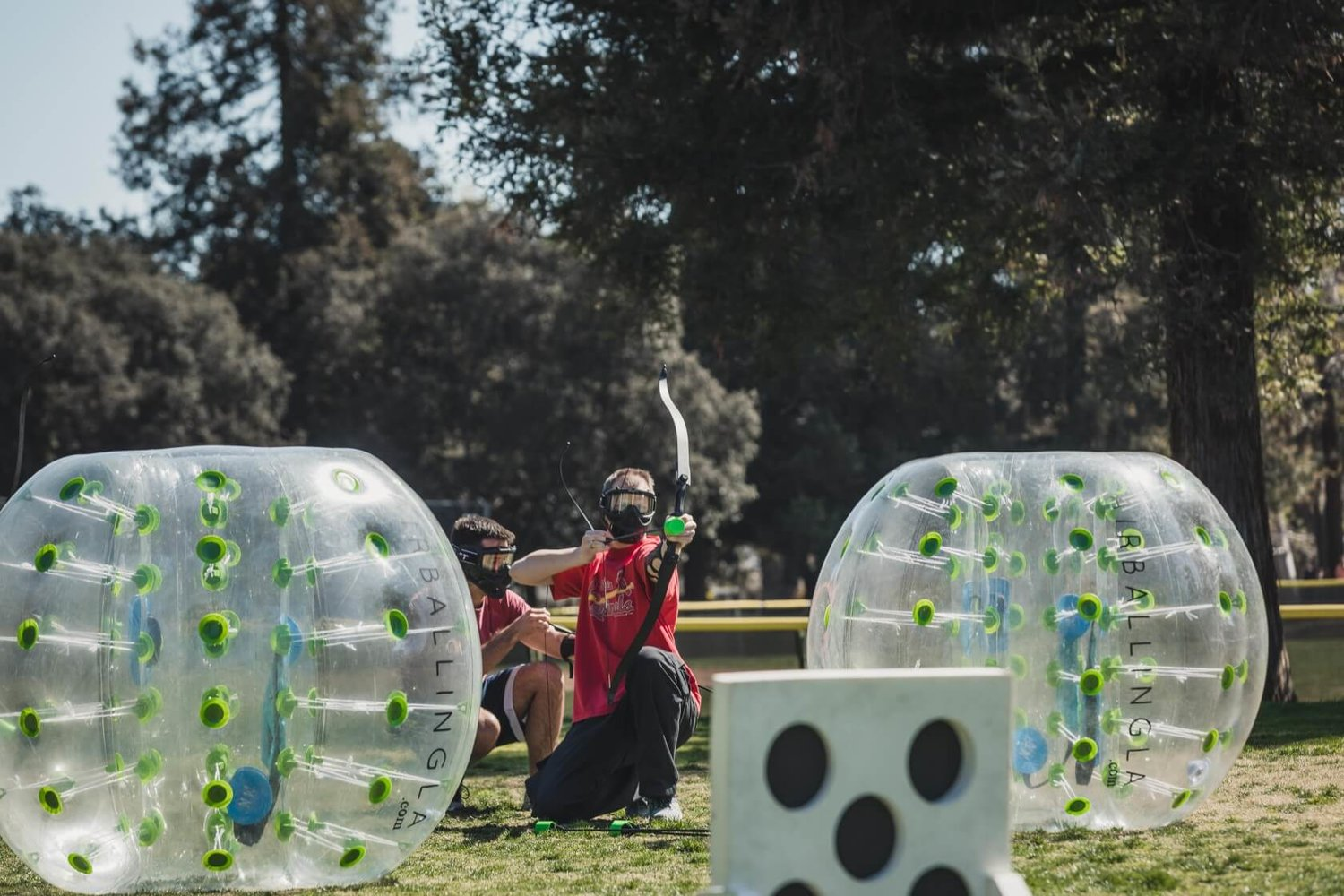
Archery tag game played in West Los Angeles

Combat archery, sometimes known as battle archery, is a sport similar to dodgeball, paintball or Nerf war played with bows and arrows tipped with foam.

== History ==
The Archery Tag equipment brand was invented by John Jackson of Waterloo, Indiana in 2011. The sport experienced a boost in popularity from the Hunger Games book and film series, which features a bow-wielding protagonist, and Jackson staged target shooting activities using his patented "non-lethal arrows" at local premieres of the films. By 2014, Jackson had licensed the game to 170 locations, in the United States, UK, The Netherlands, Russia, Singapore, and a number of other countries. Other brands such as Battle Archery, Battle Bows, or Arrow Tag have followed suit with similar formats.

== Rules and gameplay ==
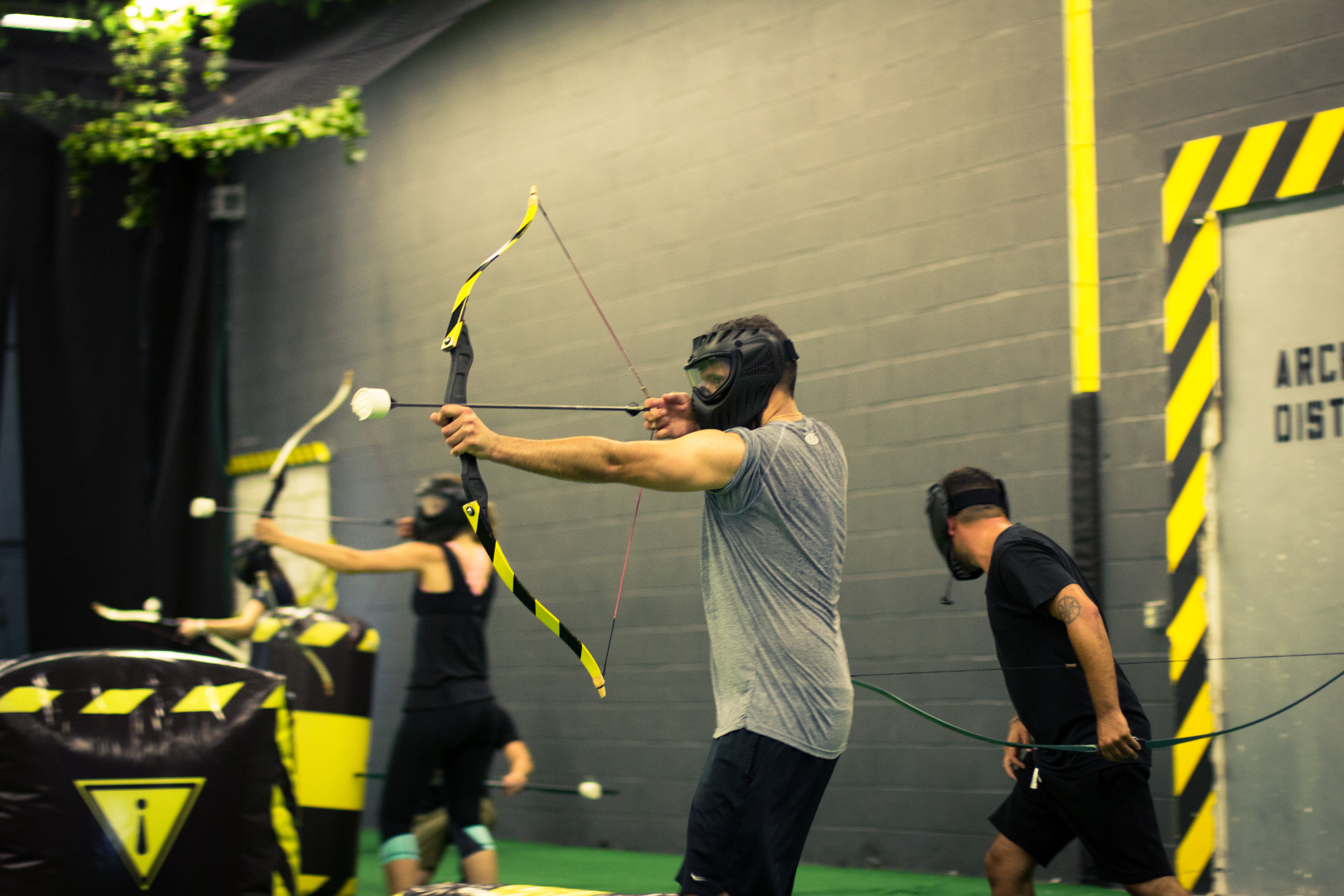
A game of archery tag in Toronto

The combat archery sport game play is a combination of 3 other main sports including, dodgeball, paintball, and archery. Participants form teams of 5 and shoot at opponents with large foam tip arrows using a bow. To avoid injury, participants wear protective face masks and use bows with less than 30lb draw weight.

The game's rules closely resemble dodgeball. The game begins with a number of arrows in the center of the arena. At the whistle, players race to collect them, before firing them at one another across the playing field. A player is eliminated if struck by an arrow, and a player can bring an eliminated teammate back into play by catching an arrow.
