= Archery Trade Association =

- Formation: 1953
- Headquarters: New Ulm, Minnesota
- Website: www.archerytrade.org

The Archery Trade Association (ATA), is the trade group representing manufacturers, retailers, distributors, sales representatives and others working in the archery and bowhunting industry. The ATA has served its members since 1953. It is dedicated to making the industry profitable by decreasing business overhead, reducing taxes and government regulation, and increasing participation in archery and bowhunting.

The organization also owns and operate the ATA Trade Show, the archery and bowhunting industry's largest and longest-running trade show worldwide. The ATA Trade Show is a member-driven, order-writing event to promote commerce within the archery and bowhunting industry. The Show is closed to the public.

== History ==
The ATA was originally formed in Wisconsin in 1953 as the Archery Manufacturers and Dealers Association (AMADA), containing within its initial membership such renowned archers as Fred Bear and Bob Lee.

One of its first tasks was standardizing bow and bow string lengths, resulting in a measure called "AMO standards." Today, the industry's 22 essential "ATA Standards" are defined in the ATA Technical Guidelines, a manual that represents about 50 years of accumulated engineering knowledge and expertise dating to Earl Hoyt, Dick Mauch (Bear Archery), and Chuck Saunders. Although these early manufacturers were business rivals, they wanted archery dealers and consumers to know their archery equipment met tough, consistent industry guidelines that wouldn't vary by manufacturer.

In the 1960s, AMADA shortened its name to the Archery Manufacturer's Organization (AMO). Its membership (mostly consisting of manufacturers) greatly increased in the 1970s after the invention of the Compound bow. In 1991, the organization moved its central location to Gainesville, Florida, under the presidency of Dick Lattimer. In 1997, with the debut of the AMO Archery Trade Show, funding formerly provided by companies' donations was replaced by the profits generated from this event.

In 2002, the AMO was reorganized into the Archery Trade Association. The ATA operates as a nonprofit effort to grow archery and bowhunting, and works with several organizations within the archery industry to promote those sports.

In 2025, the ATA, alongside Cabela's, Bass Pro Shops, Dick's Sporting Goods, and several other manufacturers and distributors, was alleged to have led a price-fixing scheme across the industry since 2014.

== Partnerships and Objectives ==
The ATA works with several organizations within the archery industry to promote archery and bowhunting. These groups include:

- USA Archery
- Archery Shooters Association
- National Field Archery Association
- International Bowhunting Organization
- American Crossbow Federation

Some of the ATA's main objectives include:

- Growing recreational archery;
- Increasing public awareness of archery and bowhunting;
- Maintaining and increasing of the number of archers and bowhunters;
- Unifying archers and bowhunters, and archery and bowhunting organizations;
- Lowering barriers of entry into archery and bowhunting, and increasing opportunities for participation.

== Membership ==
In 2000, the AMO consisted of more than 600 manufacturers, dealers and distributors. Today the annual ATA Trade Show regularly draws more than 600 exhibitors and more than 9,000 attendees. Only ATA members can attend the Show.

== Publications ==
The ATA regularly contributes material to Inside Archery, ArrowTrade and Archery Business.

The ATA also publishes various press releases, and maintains websites such as archerytrade.org and archery360.com.

Additionally, it promotes awareness of Chronic wasting disease alongside the Chronic Wasting Disease Alliance, of which it is a sponsor.

== See also ==
- Archery
- Bow (weapon)
- Arrow
- List of archery terms
