= Fistmele =

Distance between a bow and its string

Fistmele, also known as the "brace height", is a term used in archery to describe the distance between a bow and its string. The term itself is a Saxon word (suffix -mele referring to the old form of the archaic sense of meal as "measure") indicating the measure of a clenched hand with the thumb extended.

Different brace heights may be obtained from the same length of string by twisting it around before affixing it to the bow. A proper height helps to reduce noise upon the release of an arrow and vibrations in the bow itself. Consequently, if the distance is too small excess noise and poor arrow flight are the results. A bow is said to be "overstrung" when this distance is exceeded.

== See also ==
- Archery
- Bow string
- Archery Trade Association standards
