= Fletching =

Aerodynamic stabilization of arrows

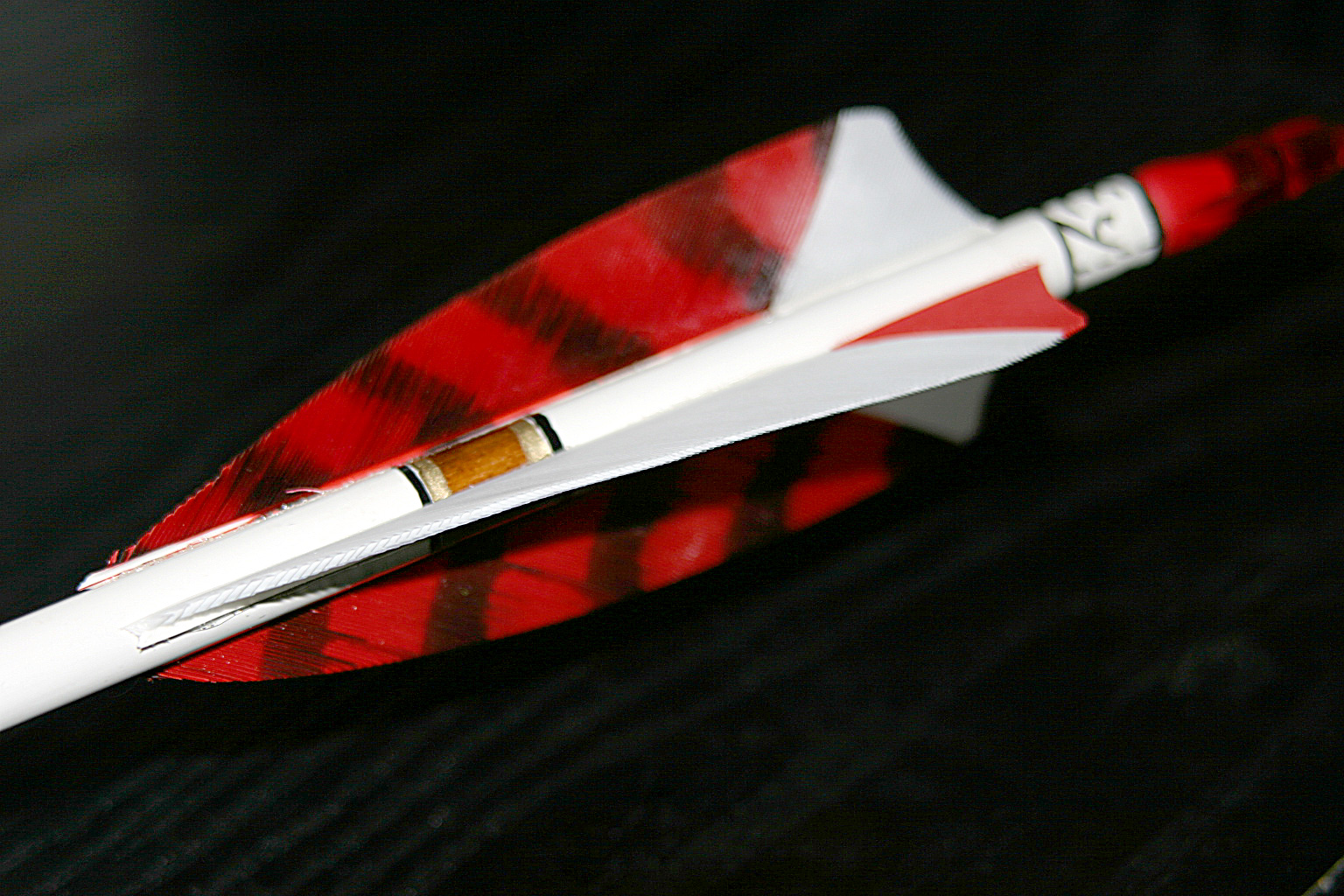
Feather fletching – these are shield cut with barred red hen feathers and a solid white cock.

Fletching is the fin-shaped aerodynamic stabilization device attached on arrows, crossbow bolts, darts, and javelins, typically made from light semi-flexible materials such as feathers or bark. Each piece of such a device is a fletch, also known as a flight or feather. A fletcher is a person who attaches fletchings to the shaft of arrows. Fletchers were traditionally associated with the Worshipful Company of Fletchers, a guild in the City of London.

The word comes from the French word flèche, meaning 'arrow', which has its roots in the Old Frankish fliukka.

== Description ==
As a noun, fletching refers collectively to the fins or vanes, each of which individually is known as a fletch. Traditionally, the fletching consists of three matched half-feathers attached near the back of the arrow or shaft of the dart that are equally spaced around its circumference. Four fletchings have also been used.

In English archery, the male feather, from a cock, is used on the outside of the arrow, while the other two stabilizing feathers are from a female, or hen. Traditional archery lore about feather curvature is that a right handed archer should shoot a right winged feather and right handed helical, and a left handed archer should use the opposite. Slow motion cameras show the arrow does not begin to spin until it is well past the riser (centre section of the bow), and the most important point is to have consistency in fletching. Shooting a feathered arrow with a bow with a riser shelf, instead of a plastic vane, is wiser since the feathers will compress and flatten while coming off the bow.

On compound bows, feathers may be a hindrance, and plastic vanes are a better solution. At the high speeds coming off a compound bow, plastic vanes with no curvature still allow the arrow to fly straight without tumbling. Also, noise is increased with feathers on these higher-powered bows, which can be a problem for hunters.

Today, modern plastics may be used instead of feathers. Fletches were traditionally attached with both glue and silk thread, but with modern glue/thread/tape this is no longer necessary, unless the arrow is a reproduction of a historical arrow. The fletching is used to stabilize the arrow aerodynamically. Feather fletches impart a natural spin on an arrow due to the rough and smooth sides of a feather and the natural curve, determined by which wing the feather came from. Vanes need to be placed at a slight angle (called an offset fletch), or set into a twist (called a helical fletch) to create the same effect, but all are there to impart stability to the projectile to ensure that the projectile does not tumble during flight.

More generally, "fletching" can refer to any structures added to a projectile to aerodynamically stabilize its flight, many of which resemble arrows in form and function. For instance, the feathers at the butt end of a dart of the type cast using an atlatl are very similar in purpose and construction to those used in arrows. Most of the techniques of fletching were likely adapted from earlier dart-making techniques. The fins used to stabilize rockets work in a similar manner.

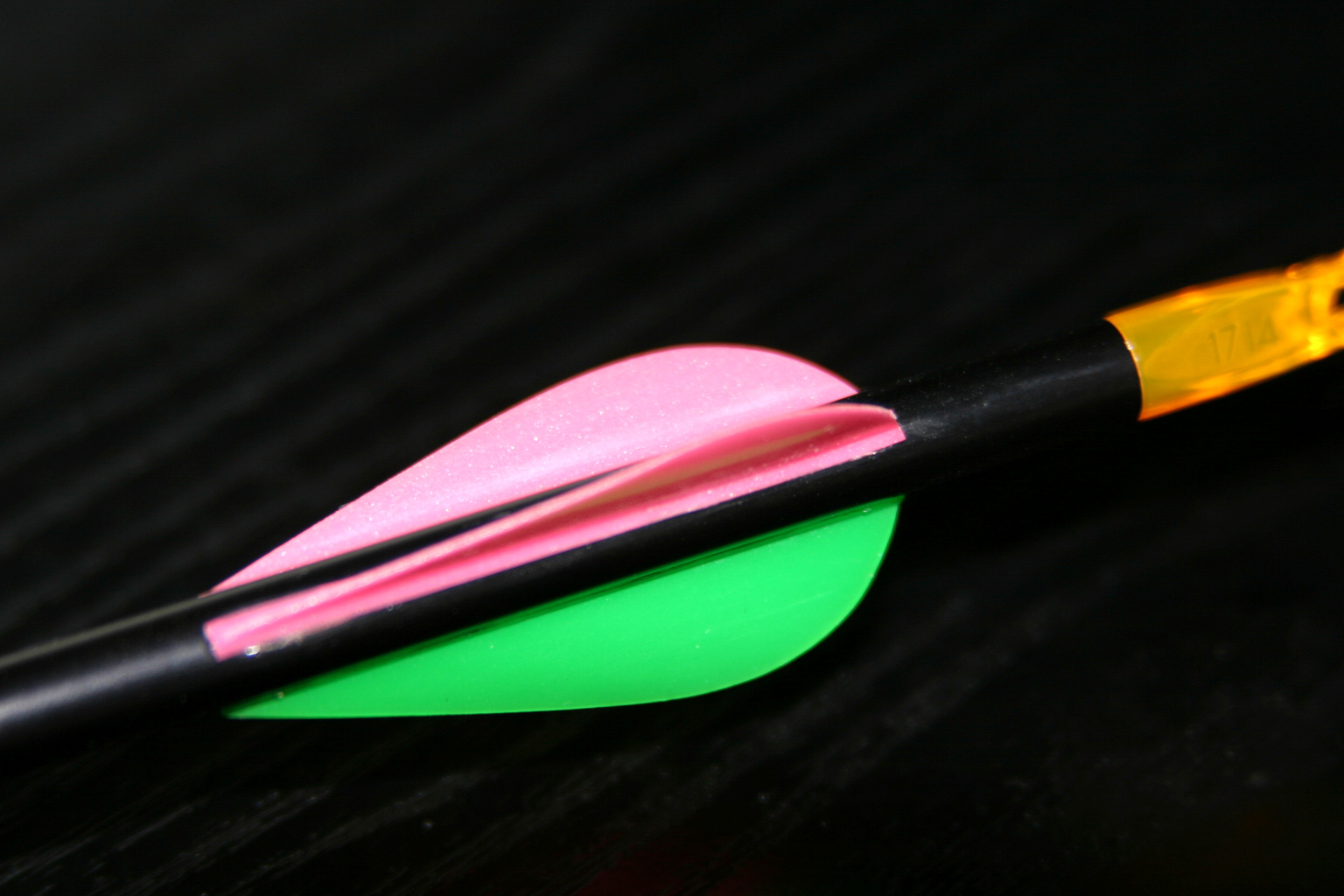
Plastic fletching (also known as vanes) – this example is parabolic cut with pink hen vanes (the ones put oblique to the bow when nocked on the string) and a green cock (the one – or ones, with even-numbered vanes – put perpendicular to it).

== See also ==
- Flechette
- Fletcher (surname)
- Hane, fletching of the Japanese arrow (ya).
- Worshipful Company of Fletchers
