= Arrow =

Shafted projectile that is shot with a bow

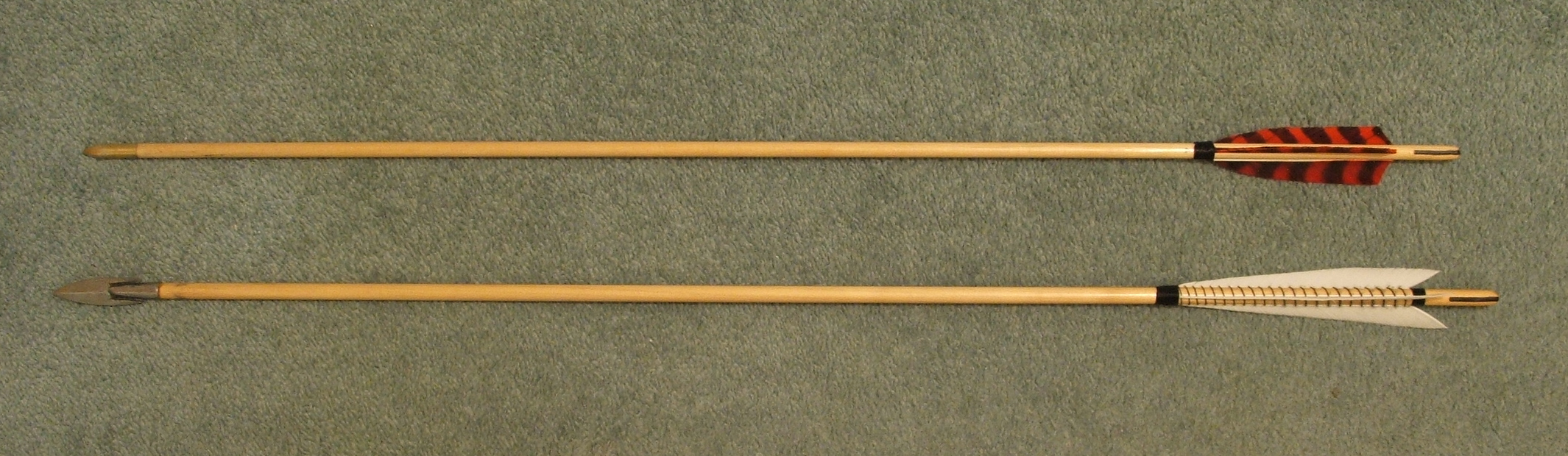
Traditional target arrow (top) and replica medieval arrow (bottom)

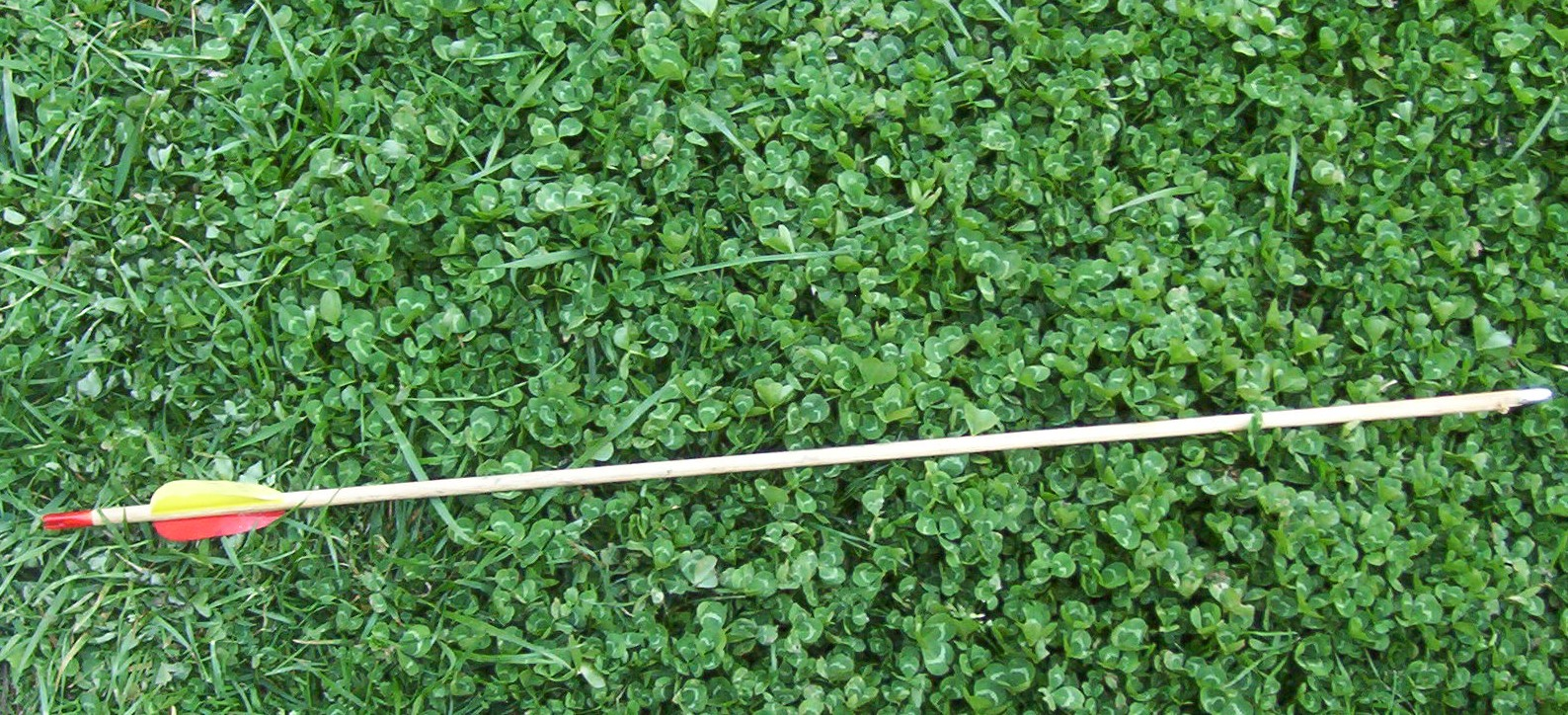
Modern arrow with plastic fletchings and nock

An arrow is a fin-stabilized projectile launched by a bow. A typical arrow usually consists of a long, stiff, straight shaft with a weighty (and usually sharp and pointed) arrowhead attached to the front end, multiple fin-like stabilizers called fletchings mounted near the rear, and a slot at the rear end called a nock for engaging the bowstring. A container or bag carrying additional arrows for convenient reloading is called a quiver.

The use of bows and arrows by humans predates recorded history and is common to most cultures. A craftsman who makes arrows is a fletcher, and one who makes arrowheads is an arrowsmith.

== History ==
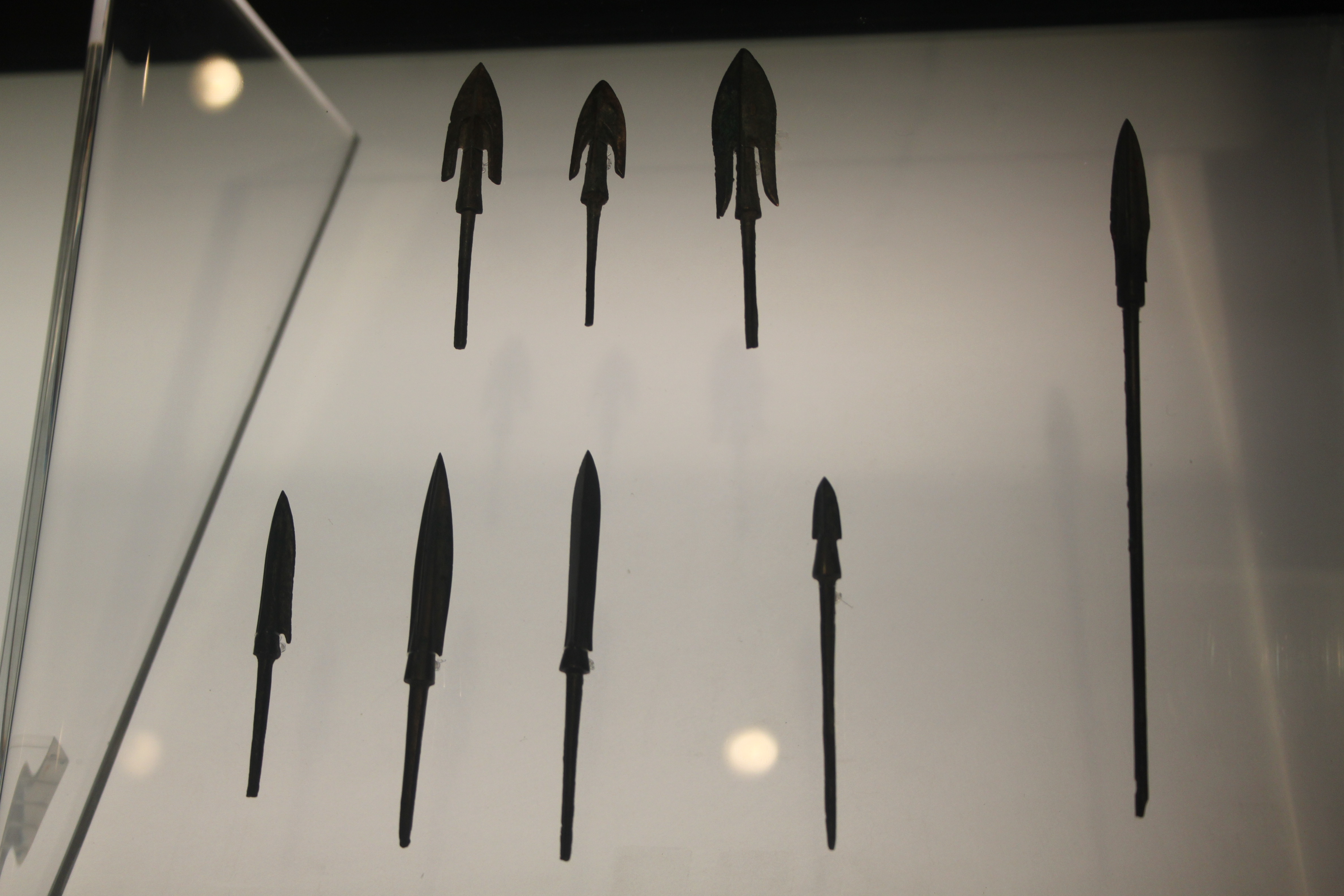
Warring States bronze arrowheads

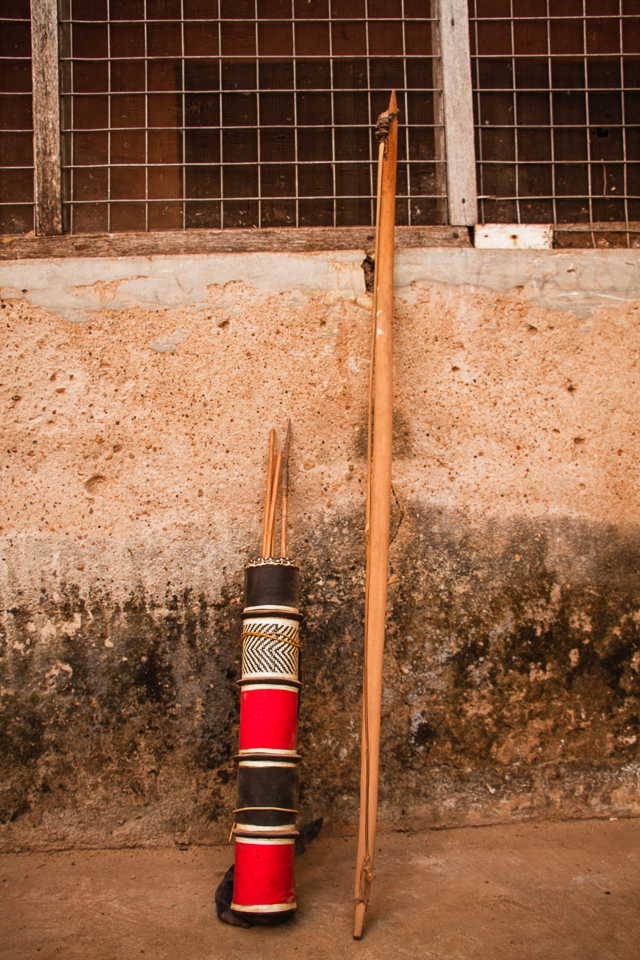
African bow and arrows in a quiver

The oldest evidence of likely arrowheads, dating to c. 64,000 years ago, were found in Sibudu Cave, current South Africa. Likely arrowheads made from animal bones have been discovered in the Fa Hien Cave in Sri Lanka which are also the oldest evidence for the use of arrows outside of Africa dating to c. 48,000 years ago. The oldest evidence of the use of bows to shoot arrows dates to about 10,000 years ago; it is based on pinewood arrows found in the Ahrensburg valley north of Hamburg. They had shallow grooves on the base, indicating that they were shot from a bow. The oldest bow so far recovered is about 8,000 years old, found in the Holmegård swamp in Denmark. Archery seems to have arrived in the Americas with the Arctic small tool tradition, about 4,500 years ago.

== Size ==
Schematic of an arrow with many parts.

Arrow sizes vary greatly across cultures, ranging from eighteen inches to five feet (45 cm to 152 cm). However, most modern arrows are 75 cm (30 in) to 96 cm (38 in) in length. Arrows recovered from the Mary Rose, an English warship that sank in 1545 whose remains were raised in 1982, were mostly 76 cm (30 in) long. Very short arrows have been used, shot through a guide attached either to the bow (an "overdraw") or to the archer's wrist (the Turkish "siper"). These may fly farther than heavier arrows, and an enemy without suitable equipment may find himself unable to return them.

== Components ==
=== Shaft ===
The shaft is the primary structural element of the arrow, to which the other components are attached. Traditional arrow shafts are made from strong, lightweight wood, bamboo, or reeds, while modern shafts may be made from aluminium, carbon fibre reinforced plastic, or a combination of materials. Such shafts are typically made from an aluminium core wrapped with a carbon fibre outer. A traditional premium material is Port Orford Cedar.

==== Spine ====
The stiffness of the shaft is known as its spine, referring to how little the shaft bends when compressed, hence an arrow which bends less is said to have more spine. In order to strike consistently, a group of arrows must be similarly spined. "Center-shot" bows, in which the arrow passes through the central vertical axis of the bow riser, may obtain consistent results from arrows with a wide range of spines. However, most traditional bows are not center-shot and the arrow has to deflect around the handle in the archer's paradox; such bows tend to give most consistent results with a narrower range of arrow spine that allows the arrow to deflect correctly around the bow. Bows with higher draw weight will generally require stiffer arrows, with more spine (less flexibility) to give the correct amount of flex when shot.

==== GPI rating ====
The weight of an arrow shaft can be expressed in GPI (grains per inch). The length of a shaft in inches multiplied by its GPI rating gives the weight of the shaft in grains. For example, a shaft that is 30 inches (760 mm) long and has a GPI of 9.5 weighs 285 grains (18 grams). This does not include the other elements of a finished arrow, so a complete arrow will be heavier than the shaft alone.

==== Footed arrows ====
Sometimes a shaft will be made of two different types of wood fastened together, resulting in what is known as a footed arrow. Known by some as the finest of wood arrows, footed arrows were used both by early Europeans and Native Americans. Footed arrows will typically consist of a short length of hardwood near the head of the arrow, with the remainder of the shaft consisting of softwood. By reinforcing the area most likely to break, the arrow is more likely to survive impact, while maintaining overall flexibility and lighter weight.

==== Barreled arrow shafts ====
A barreled arrow shaft is one that tapers in diameter bi-directionally. This allows for an arrow that has an optimum weight yet retains enough strength to resist flex.

Barreled arrow shafts are considered the zenith of pre-industrial archery technology, reaching their peak design among the Ottomans.

=== Arrowhead ===
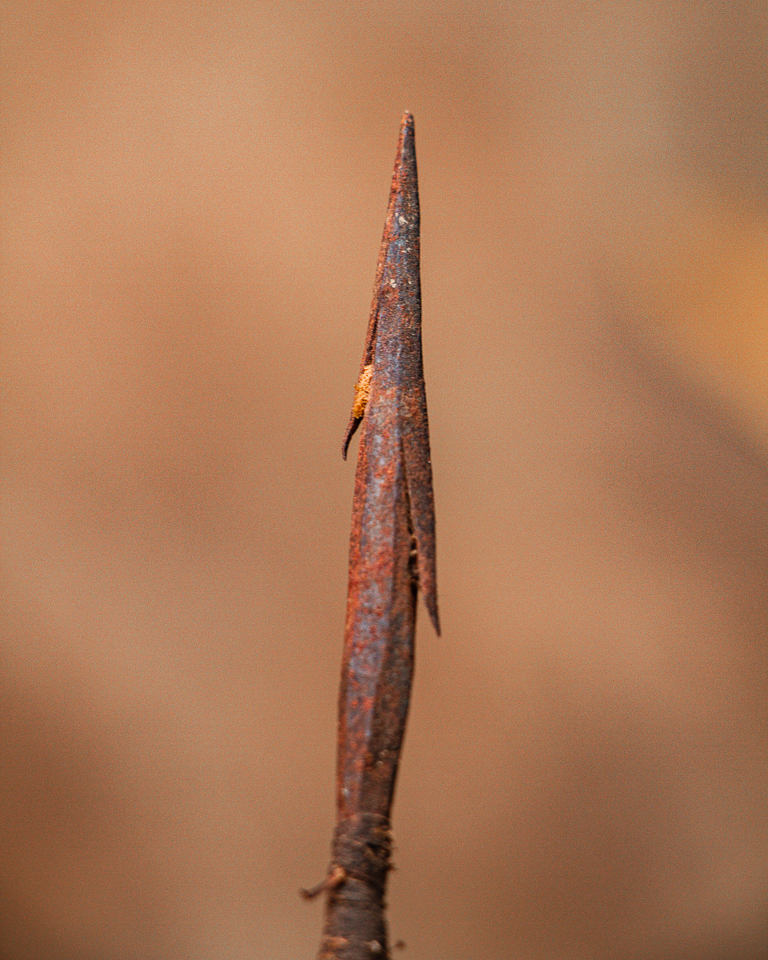
African Arrowhead

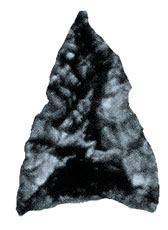
Obsidian broadhead

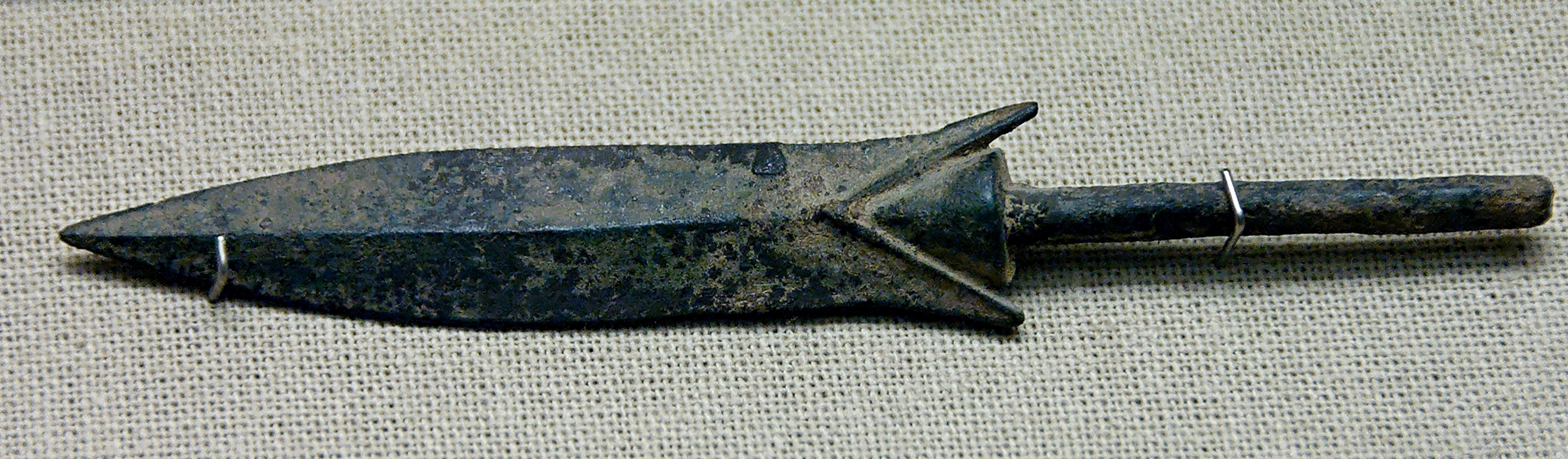
Ancient Greek bronze arrowhead, 4th century BC, from Olynthus, Chalcidice

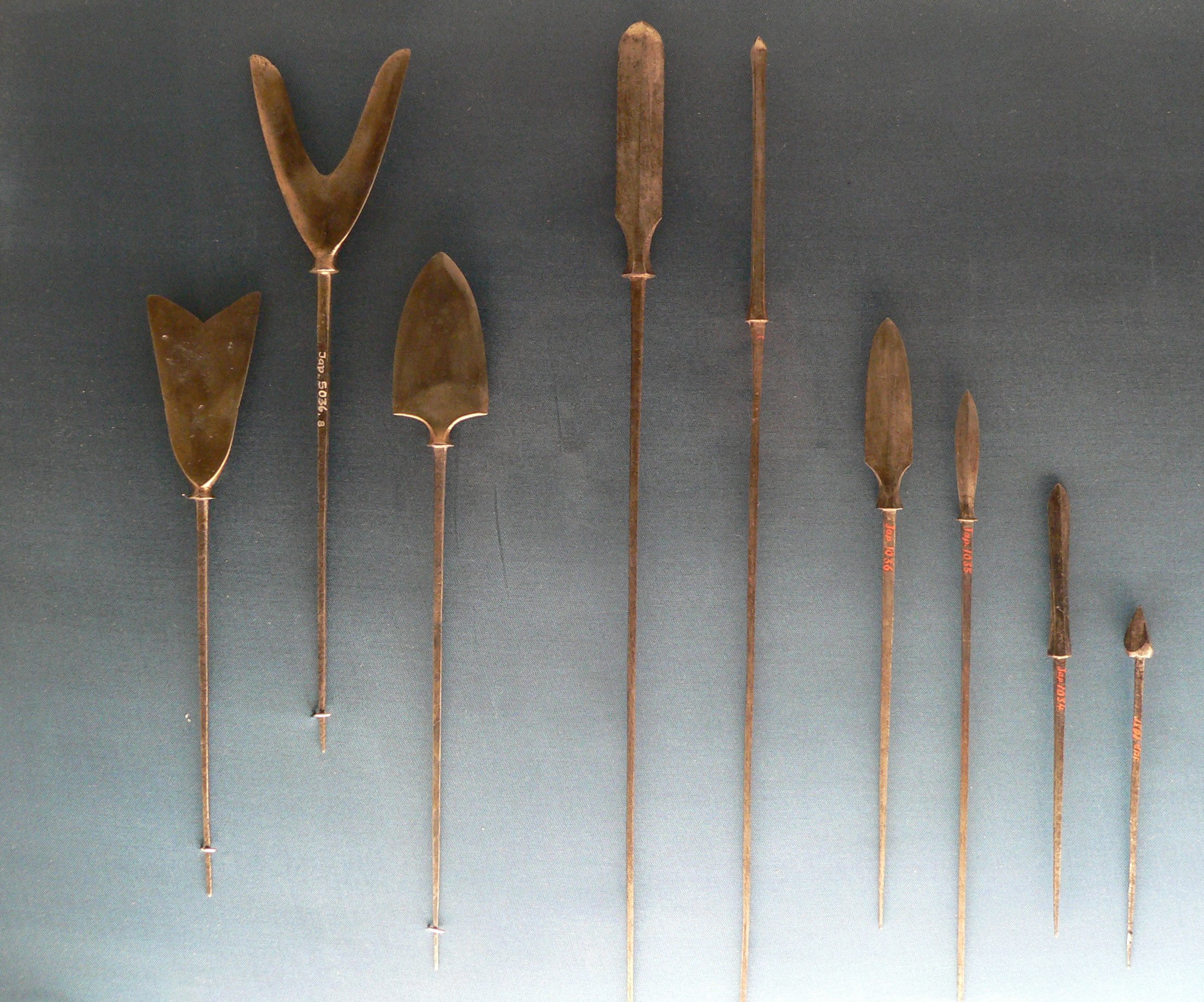
Various Japanese arrowheads

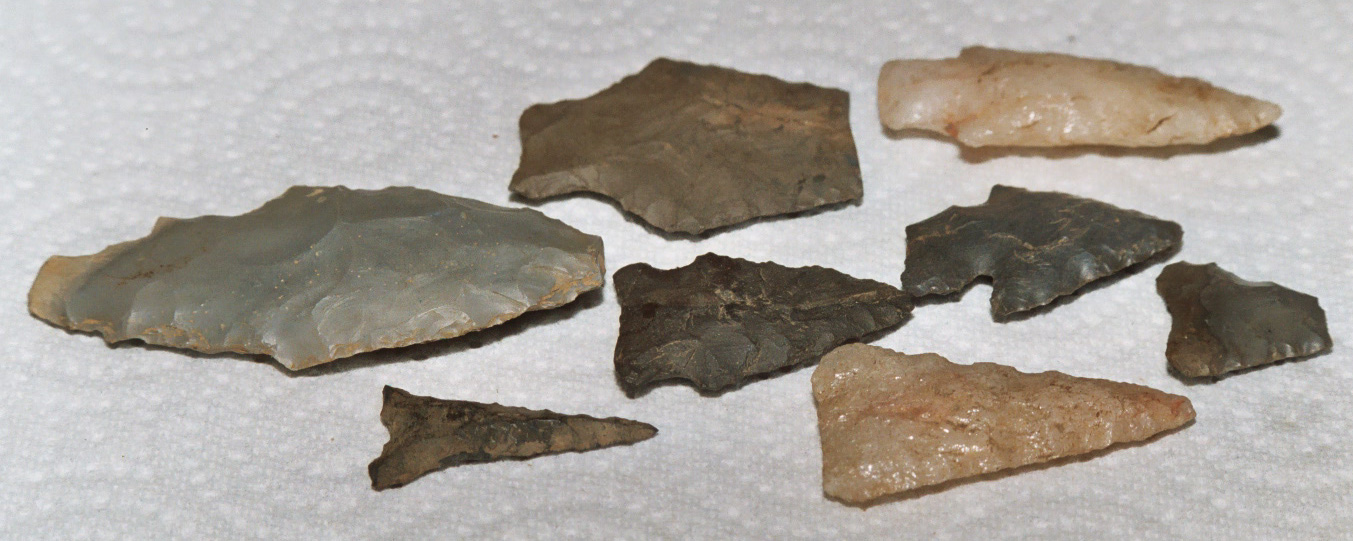
Native American arrowheads

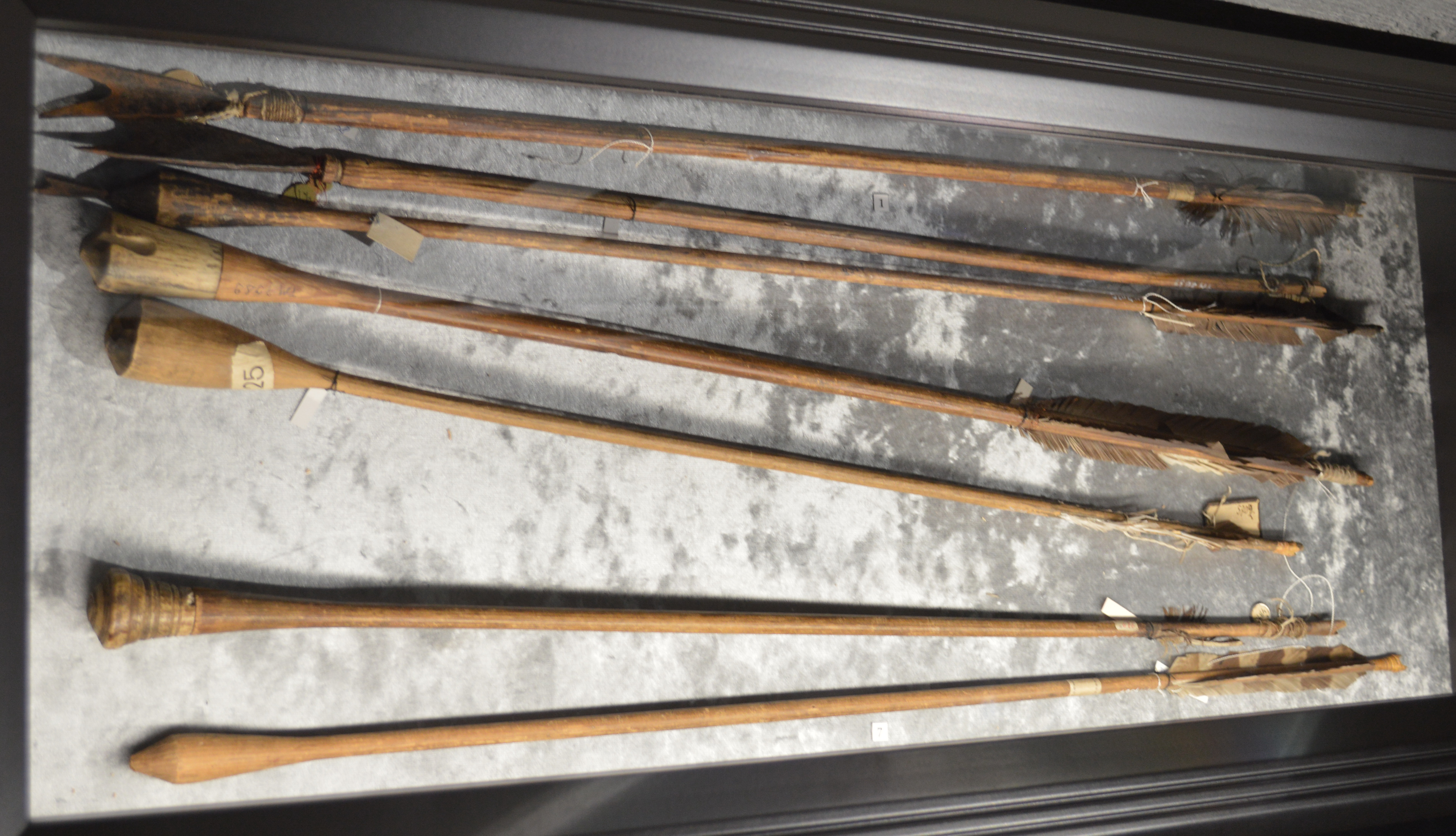
Siberian hunting arrows with blunt heads

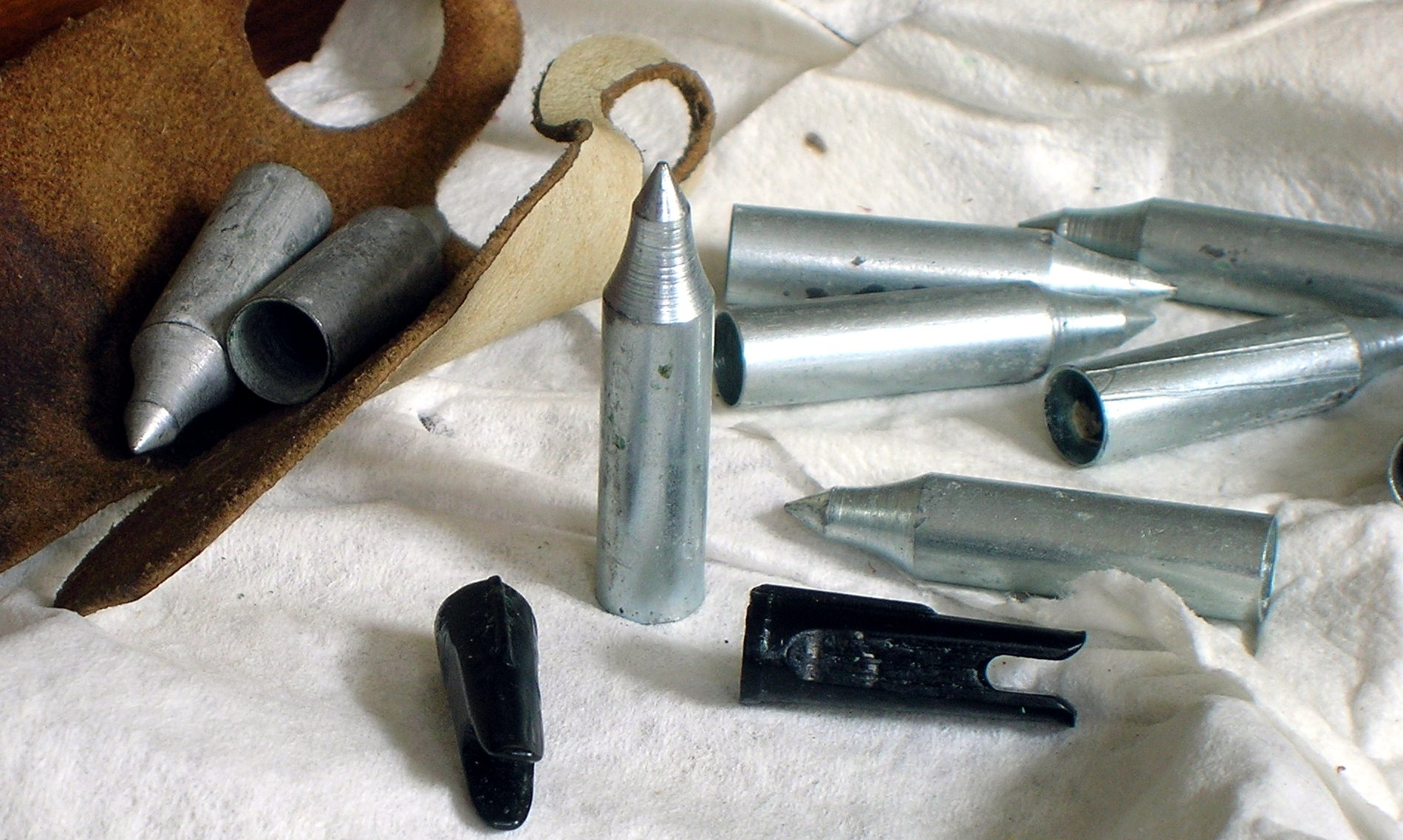
20th-century field points

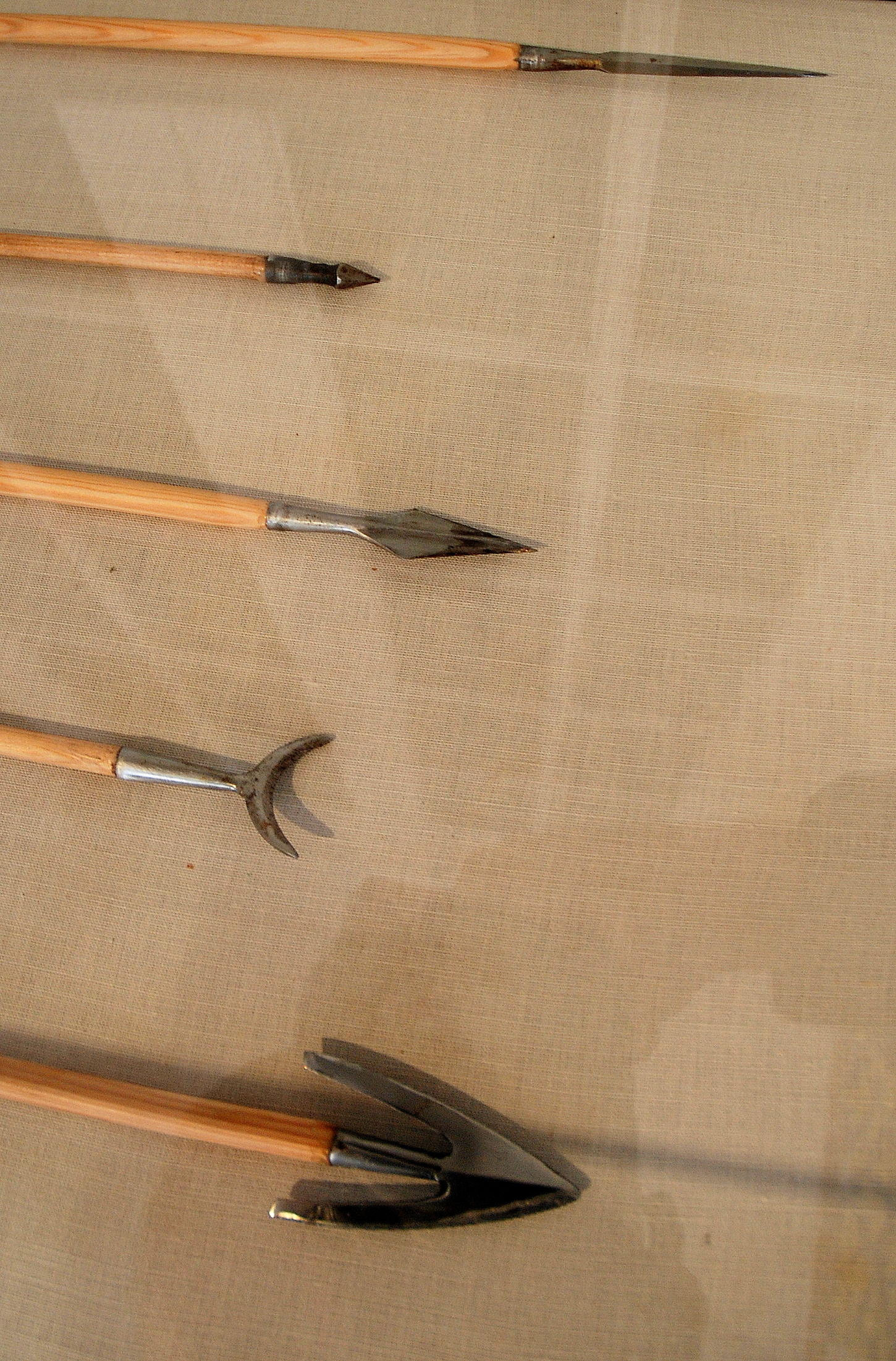
Modern replicas of various medieval European arrowheads

The arrowhead or projectile point is the primary functional part of the arrow, and plays the largest role in determining its purpose. Some arrows may simply use a sharpened tip of the solid shaft, but it is far more common for separate arrowheads to be made, usually from metal, horn, or some other hard material. Arrowheads are usually separated by function:

- Bodkin points are short, rigid points with a small cross-section. They were made of unhardened iron and may have been used for better or longer flight, or for cheaper production. It has been mistakenly suggested that the bodkin came into its own as a means of penetrating armour, but research has found no hardened bodkin points, so it is likely that it was first designed either to extend range or as a cheaper and simpler alternative to the broadhead. In a modern test, a direct hit from a hard steel bodkin point penetrated Damascus chain armour. However, archery was not effective against plate armour, which became available to knights of fairly modest means by the late 14th century.
- Blunts are unsharpened arrowheads occasionally used for types of target shooting, for shooting at stumps or other targets of opportunity, or hunting small game when the goal is to concuss the target without penetration. Blunts are commonly made of metal or hard rubber. They may stun, and occasionally, the arrow shaft may penetrate the head and the target; safety is still important with blunt arrows.
- Judo points have spring wires extending sideways from the tip. These catch on grass and debris to prevent the arrow from being lost in the vegetation. Used for practice and for small game.
- Broadheads were used for war and are still used for hunting. Medieval broadheads could be made from steel, sometimes with hardened edges. They usually have two to four sharp blades that cause massive bleeding in the victim. Their function is to deliver a wide cutting edge so as to kill as quickly as possible by cleanly cutting major blood vessels, and cause further trauma on removal. They are expensive, damage most targets, and are usually not used for practice. Broadheads are illegal in the UK.

There are two main types of broadheads used by hunters: the fixed-blade and the mechanical types. While the fixed-blade broadhead keeps its blades rigid and unmovable on the broadhead at all times, the mechanical broadhead deploys its blades upon contact with the target, its blades swinging out to wound the target. The mechanical head flies better because it is more streamlined, but has less penetration as it uses some of the kinetic energy in the arrow to deploy its blades. Preferences for fixed or mechanical broadheads vary widely in the hunting community, typically varying by species. In general, both types are widely used on game up to the size of white-tailed deer; as game size increases, fixed blades become more common. Broadheads used for hunting dangerous game such as African buffalo are almost always fixed-blade.

- Field tips or field points are similar to target points and have a distinct shoulder, so that missed outdoor shots do not become as stuck in obstacles such as tree stumps. They are also used for shooting practice by hunters, by offering similar flight characteristics and weights as broadheads, without getting lodged in target materials and causing excessive damage upon removal.
- Target points are bullet-shaped with a conical point, designed to penetrate target butts easily without causing excessive damage to them.
- Safety arrows are designed to be used in various forms of reenactment combat, to reduce the risk when shot at people. These arrows may have heads that are very wide or padded, such as the large foam ball tip used in archery tag. In combination with bows of restricted draw weight and draw length, these heads may reduce to acceptable levels the risks of shooting arrows at suitably armoured people. The parameters will vary depending on the specific rules being used and on the levels of risk felt acceptable to the participants. For instance, SCA combat rules require a padded head at least 1 1/4 in (3.2 cm) in diameter, with bows not exceeding 28 inches (710 mm) and 50 lb (23 kg) of draw for use against well-armoured individuals.

Arrowheads may be attached to the shaft with a cap, a socketed tang, or inserted into a split in the shaft and held by a process called hafting. Points attached with caps are simply slid snugly over the end of the shaft, or may be held on with hot glue. Split-shaft construction involves splitting the arrow shaft lengthwise, inserting the arrowhead, and securing it using a ferrule, sinew, or wire.

=== Fletchings ===
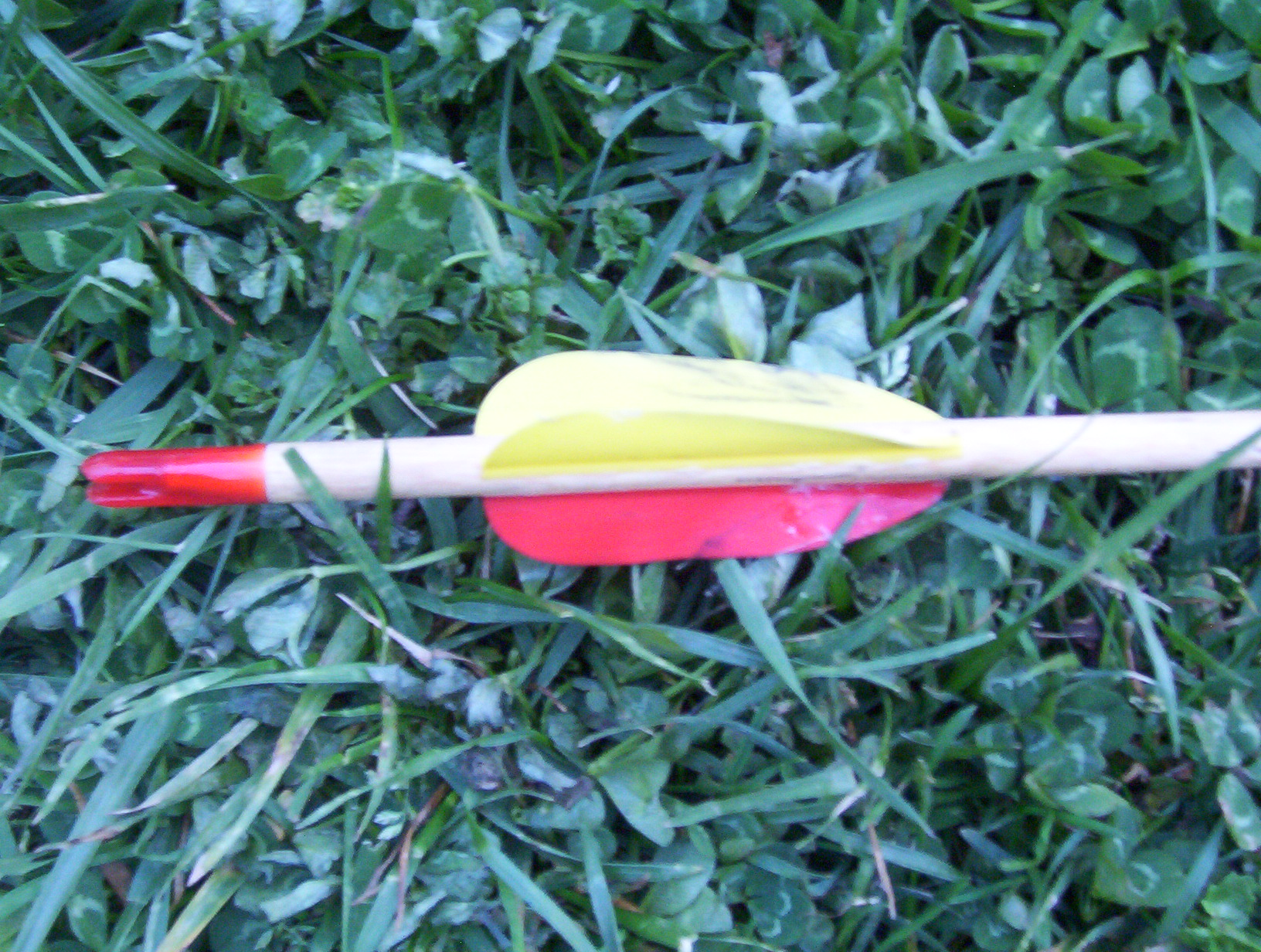
Straight parabolic fletchings on an arrow.

Fletchings are found at the back of the arrow and act as airfoils to provide a small amount of force used to stabilize the flight of the arrow. They are designed to keep the arrow pointed in the direction of travel by strongly damping down any tendency to pitch or yaw. Some cultures, for example most in New Guinea, did not use fletching on their arrows. Also, arrows without fletching (called bare shaft) are used for training purposes, because they make certain errors by the archer more visible.

Fletchings are traditionally made from feathers (often from a goose or turkey) bound to the arrow's shaft, but are now often made of plastic (known as "vanes"). Historically, some arrows used for the proofing of armour used copper vanes. Flight archers may use razor blades for fletching, in order to reduce air resistance. With conventional three-feather fletching, one feather, called the "cock" feather, is at a right angle to the nock, and is normally nocked so that it will not contact the bow when the arrow is shot. Four-feather fletching is usually symmetrical and there is no preferred orientation for the nock; this makes nocking the arrow slightly easier.

Natural feathers are usually prepared by splitting and sanding the quill before gluing. Further, the feather may be trimmed to shape, die-cut or burned by a hot electrically heated wire. It is crucial that all the feathers of an arrow have the same drag, so manual trimming is rarely used by modern fletchers. The burning-wire method is popular because different shapes are possible by bending the wire, and the fletching can be symmetrically trimmed after gluing by rotating the arrow on a fixture.

Some fletchings are dyed. Two-toned fletchings usually make each fletching from two feathers knit together. The front fletching is often camouflaged, and the rear fletching bright so that the archer can easily track the arrow.

Artisans who make arrows by hand are known as "fletchers", a word related to the French word for arrow, flèche. This is the same derivation as the verb "fletch", meaning to provide an arrow with its feathers. Glue and thread are the traditional methods of attaching fletchings. A "fletching jig" is often used in modern times, to hold the fletchings in exactly the right orientation on the shaft while the glue hardens.

Whenever natural fletching is used, the feathers on any one arrow must come from the same wing of the bird, the most common being the right-wing flight feathers of turkeys. The slight cupping of natural feathers requires them to be fletched with a right-twist for right wing, a left-twist for left wing. This rotation, through a combination of gyroscopic stabilization and increased drag on the rear of the arrow, helps the arrow to fly straight away. Artificial helical fletchings have the same effect. Most arrows will have three fletches, but some have four or even more. Fletchings generally range from two to six inches (50 to 150 mm) in length; flight arrows intended to travel the maximum possible distance typically have very low fletching, while hunting arrows with broadheads require long and high fletching to stabilize them against the aerodynamic effect of the head. Fletchings may also be cut in different ways, the two most common being parabolic (i.e. a smooth curved shape) and shield (i.e. shaped as one-half of a very narrow shield) cut.

In modern archery with screw-in points, right-hand rotation is generally preferred as it makes the points self-tighten. In traditional archery, some archers prefer a left rotation because it gets the hard (and sharp) quill of the feather farther away from the arrow-shelf and the shooter's hand.

A flu-flu is a type of fletching normally made by using long sections of full length feathers taken from a turkey; in most cases, six or more sections are used rather than the traditional three. Alternatively two long feathers can be spiraled around the end of the arrow shaft. The extra fletching generates more drag and slows the arrow down rapidly after a short distance of about 30 m (98 ft) or so. Flu-flu arrows are often used for hunting birds, or for children's archery, and can also be used to play flu-flu golf.

=== Wraps ===
Wraps are thin pre-cut sheets of material, often vinyl or plastic, used to wrap the nock end of an arrow, primarily as an aid in bonding vanes and feather fletchings to the shaft. Wraps can also make the eventual removal of vanes and vane-glue easier. Additionally, they add a decorative aspect to arrow building, which can provide archers an opportunity to personalize their arrows. Brightly colored wraps can also make arrows much easier to find in the brush, and to see in downrange targets.

=== Nocks ===
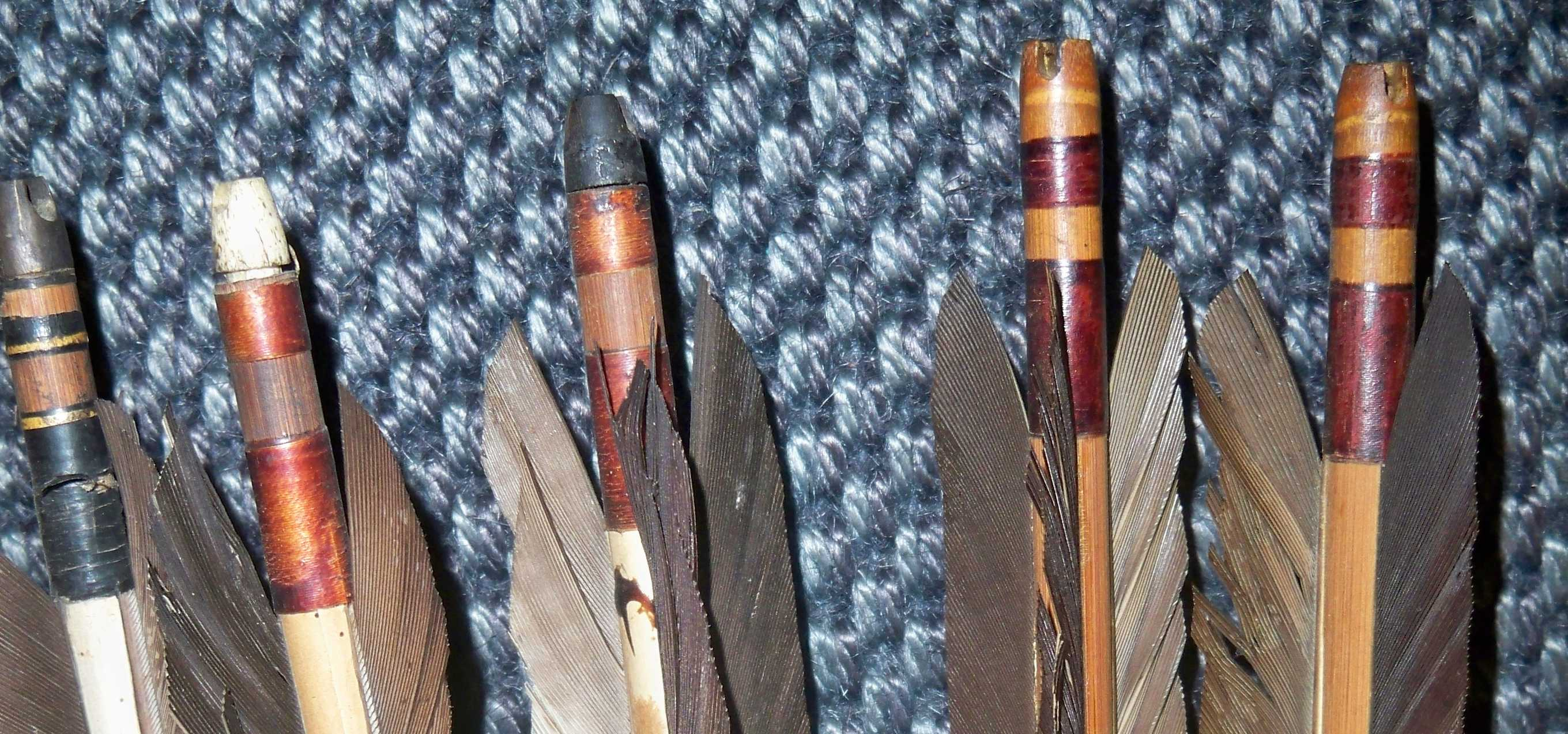
Nocks of an arrow

In English it is common to say "nock an arrow" when one readies a shot. A nock is a notch in the rearmost end of an arrow. It helps keep the arrow correctly rotated, keeps the arrow from slipping sideways during the draw or after the release, and helps maximize the arrow's energy (i.e. its range and lethality) by helping an archer place the arrow at the fastest-moving place on the bowstring. Some archers mark the nock position with beads, knots or wrappings of thread. Most compound bow shooters use a D-loop, a length of string material (or sometimes a metal bracket) attached to the string above and below the nocking point. A release aid is typically attached to the D-loop in preparation for a shot.

The main purpose of a nock is to control the rotation of the arrow. Arrows bend when released. If the bend hits the bowstave, the arrow's aim will be thrown off. Wooden arrows have a preferred bending-plane. Synthetic arrows have a designed bending plane. Usually this plane is determined by the grain of the wood of the arrow, or the structure of a synthetic arrow. The nock's slot should be rotated at an angle chosen so that when the arrow bends, it avoids or slides on the bowstave. Almost always this means that the slot of the nock must be perpendicular to the wood's grain, viewed from behind.

Self nocks are slots cut in the back of the arrow. These are simple, but can break at the base of the slot. Self nocks are often reinforced with glued servings of fiber near the base of the slot. The sturdiest nocks are separate pieces made from wood, plastic, or horn that are then attached to the end of the arrow. Modern nocks, and traditional Turkish nocks, are often constructed so as to curve around the string or even pinch it slightly, so that the arrow is unlikely to slip off.

Ancient Arab archery sometimes used "nockless arrows". In shooting at enemies, Arabs saw them pick up Arab arrows and shoot them back. So Arabs developed bowstrings with a small ring tied where the nock would normally be placed. The rear end of the arrow would be sharpened to a point, rather than slit for a nock. The rear end of the arrow would slip into the ring. The arrow could be drawn and released as usual. Then the enemy could collect the arrows, yet not shoot them back with a conventional bow. Also, since there was no nock, the nock could not break, and the arrow was less expensive. A piece of battle advice was to have several rings tied to the bowstring in case one broke. A practical disadvantage compared to a nock would be preserving the optimal rotation of the arrow, so that when it flexes, it does not hit the bowstave. The bend direction of the arrow might have been indicated by its fletching.

== Finishes and cresting ==
Arrows are usually finished so that they are not softened by rain, fog or condensation. Traditional finishes are varnishes or lacquers. Arrows sometimes need to be repaired, so it's important that the paints be compatible with glues used to attach arrowheads, fletchings, and nocks. For this reason, arrows are rarely protected by waxing.

Crests are rings or bands of paint, often brightly colored, applied to arrows on a lathe-like tool called a cresting machine, usually for the purpose of personalization. Like wraps, cresting may also be done to make arrows easier to see.

== Symbolism ==
An arrow symbol indicating the direction towards an exit on an exit sign

An arrow symbol (→) is a simple graphical or typographical representation of an arrow, consisting of a triangle or chevron at the end of a straight line. It is used to indicate a direction, such as on signs and as road surface markings.

A symbol often used by aromantic people is arrows or an arrow as the word arrow is a homophone to the shortened word aro used by aromantic people to refer to themselves.

Bow and arrow analogue in Indian trigonometry

Ancient Indian astronomers often associate the interdependent trigonometrical components with the picture of a bow and arrow, the arrow (utkrama-jyā) equivalent to the present day secant.

== See also ==
- Archery
- Arrow poison
- Bowfishing
- Crossbow bolt, also known as a "quarrel"
- Early thermal weapons
- Fire arrow
- Flechette
- Flu-flu arrow
- Signal arrow
- Swiss arrow
