= Bowstring =

String joining the two ends of a bow stave

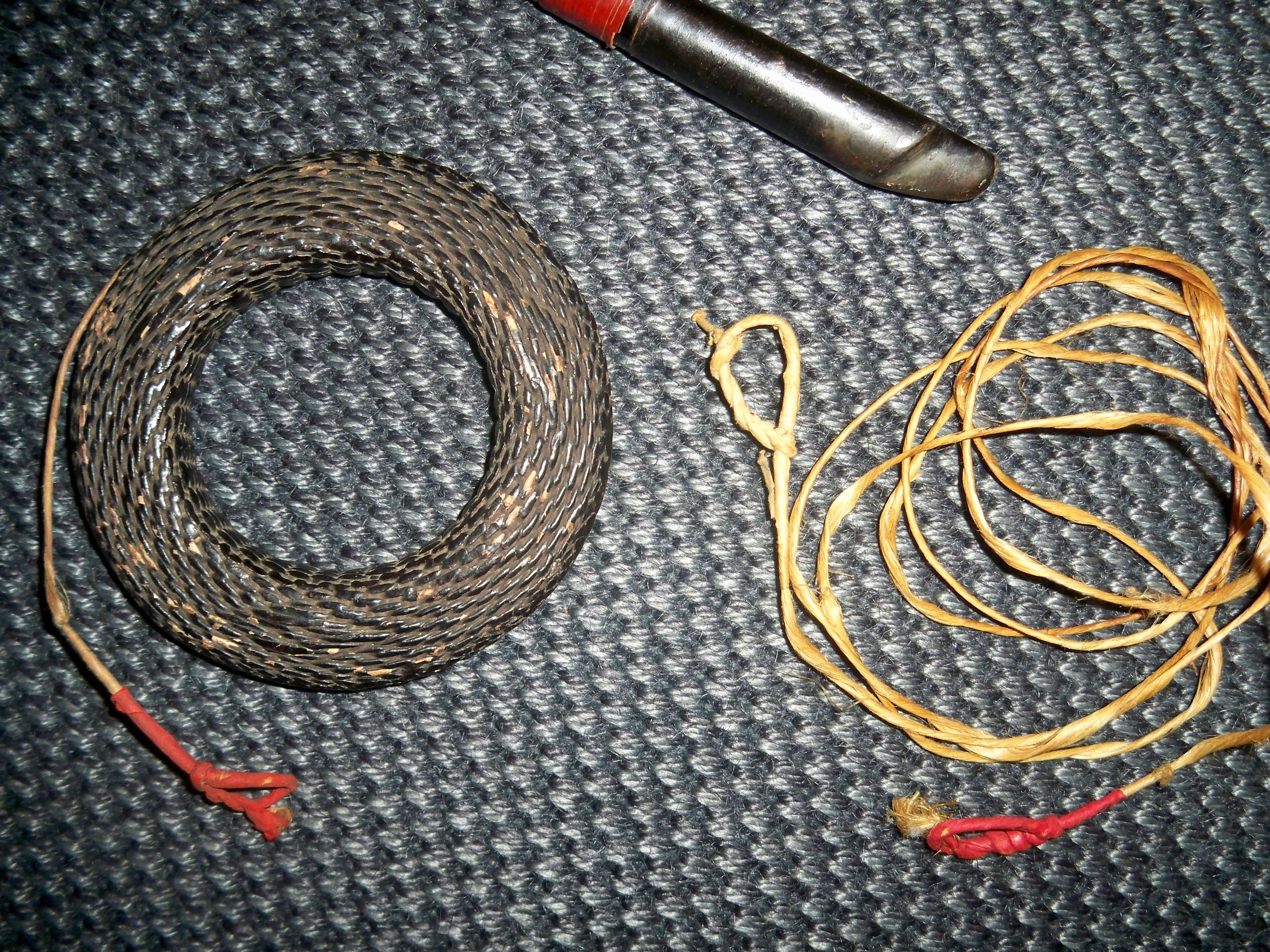
Japanese bowstring (tsuru) and woven bowstring holder (tsurumaki).

A bowstring joins the two ends of the bow stave and launches the arrow. Desirable properties include light weight, strength, resistance to abrasion, and resistance to water. Mass has most effect at the center of the string; one gram (0.035 oz) of extra mass in the middle of the string slows the arrow about as much as 3.5 grams (0.12 oz) at the ends.

== String forms ==
Most bowstrings may be described as either simple, reverse-twisted, or looped.

Simple strings may be made of any fiber, twisted into a single cord. Such strings have been used in many parts of the world and are still effective and fairly quick to make. However, they tend to be weaker for their weight, and they may also come apart if not kept constantly under tension. They are normally secured to the bow by a knot/round turn and two half-hitches at each end.

Reverse-twisted strings are traditional in Europe and North America for most natural materials. Linen and hemp fiber have been widely used. The form is also used for modern materials. A reverse-twisted string is made of separate bundles, each bundle individually twisted in one direction; the entire group of bundles is then twisted in the other direction. The result tends to be stronger for its weight than a simple or looped string, and holds together better than a simple string. Unlike some looped strings, the full thickness of the string passes around the nocks on the ends of the bow, where wear is usually greatest. Additional threads may also be laid in at the nocking points for the bow stave and for the arrow, which are sites of likely wear. The string may be secured to the bow by a knot at each end, usually a timber hitch, also known as the bowyer's knot.

The traditional "Flemish" string has a laid-in loop at one end, which is easier than most knots to fit over the nock of the bow when stringing and unstringing. It is more trouble to make; the short length, towards one end, that will form the loop is reverse-twisted first. The ends of each bundle are then laid into the main length of the bundles, which are reverse-twisted in turn. The Japanese bowstring is made by reverse-twisting in different directions in the core and outer layers of the string. See Kyūdō.

Looped strings are made of one or more continuous loops of material. Modern strings are often made as a single continuous loop: this is then served to give the final form. Disadvantages include the lesser amount of fiber at the ends, where wear is most likely; this may be overcome by serving the string.

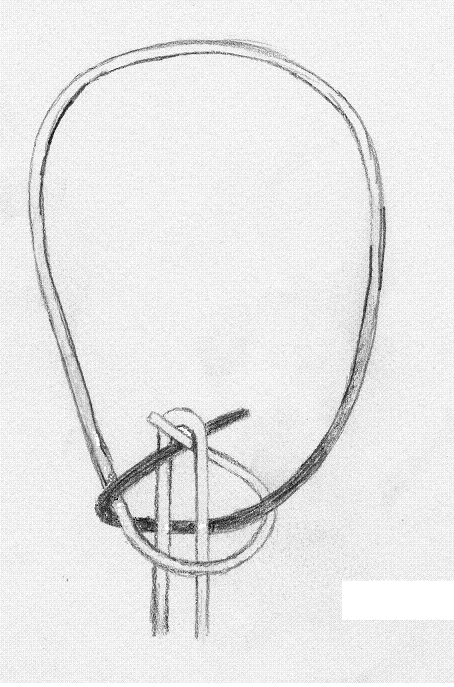
A Turkish bowstring knot

In many parts of Asia, traditional strings have a single loop in the center, with the ends made of separate lengths tied on using a special knot. This design allows extra fiber to be used at the ends, where weight is less important and wear more likely.

== String materials ==
Traditional materials include linen, hemp, other vegetable fibers, hair, sinew, silk, and rawhide. Almost any fiber may be used in emergency. Natural fibers would be very unusual on a modern recurve bow or compound bow, but are still effective and still used on traditional wooden or composite bows. Sinew and hide strings may be seriously affected by water. The author of Arab Archery suggests the hide of a young, emaciated camel. Njál's saga describes the refusal of a wife, Hallgerður, to cut her hair to make an emergency bowstring for her husband, Gunnar Hámundarson, who is then killed.

Widely used modern materials are stronger for their weight than any natural material, and most are unaffected by water. They include:

Dacron (strength per strand = 22.5 kg (50 lb), stretch = 2.6%), a commonly used polyester material. Because of its durability and stretch, Dacron is commonly used on beginners' equipment, wooden bows, and older bows. The relatively high stretch causes less shock to the bow, which is an important consideration for wooden-handled recurves. Dacron strings are easy to maintain and can last several years.

Liquid crystal polymers such as Kevlar and Vectran (strength per strand = 31.8 kg (70 lb), stretch = 0.8%) are polymer materials with a higher density and smaller diameter than Dacron, which results in a faster arrow speed (approximately 2 metres per second (6.6 ft/s) faster).

Ultra-high-molecular-weight polyethylenes, such as Spectra and Dyneema (strength per strand = 45.5 kg (100 lb), stretch = 1.0%), have been used since the 1990s. They are lighter, therefore faster, than Kevlar—and have a much longer life.

Modern strings are often made from composite fibres—such as a mixture of Vectran and Dyneema—to gain the advantages of both.

== Serving ==
Serving a bowstring refers to the use of an additional thread, commonly wrapped round the main string at the nocking points where abrasion is most likely, and also used on looped strings to keep the two sides of the loop together. These threads are also wrapped around compound bow cables, generally on portions that regularly contact either the cams, cable slides, or roller guards, minimizing the effects of abrasion on the cables themselves.

== See also ==
- Archery
- Bow (weapon)
- Fistmele
- Garrote
