= Killing of Cecil the lion =

2015 killing in Zimbabwe

Cecil
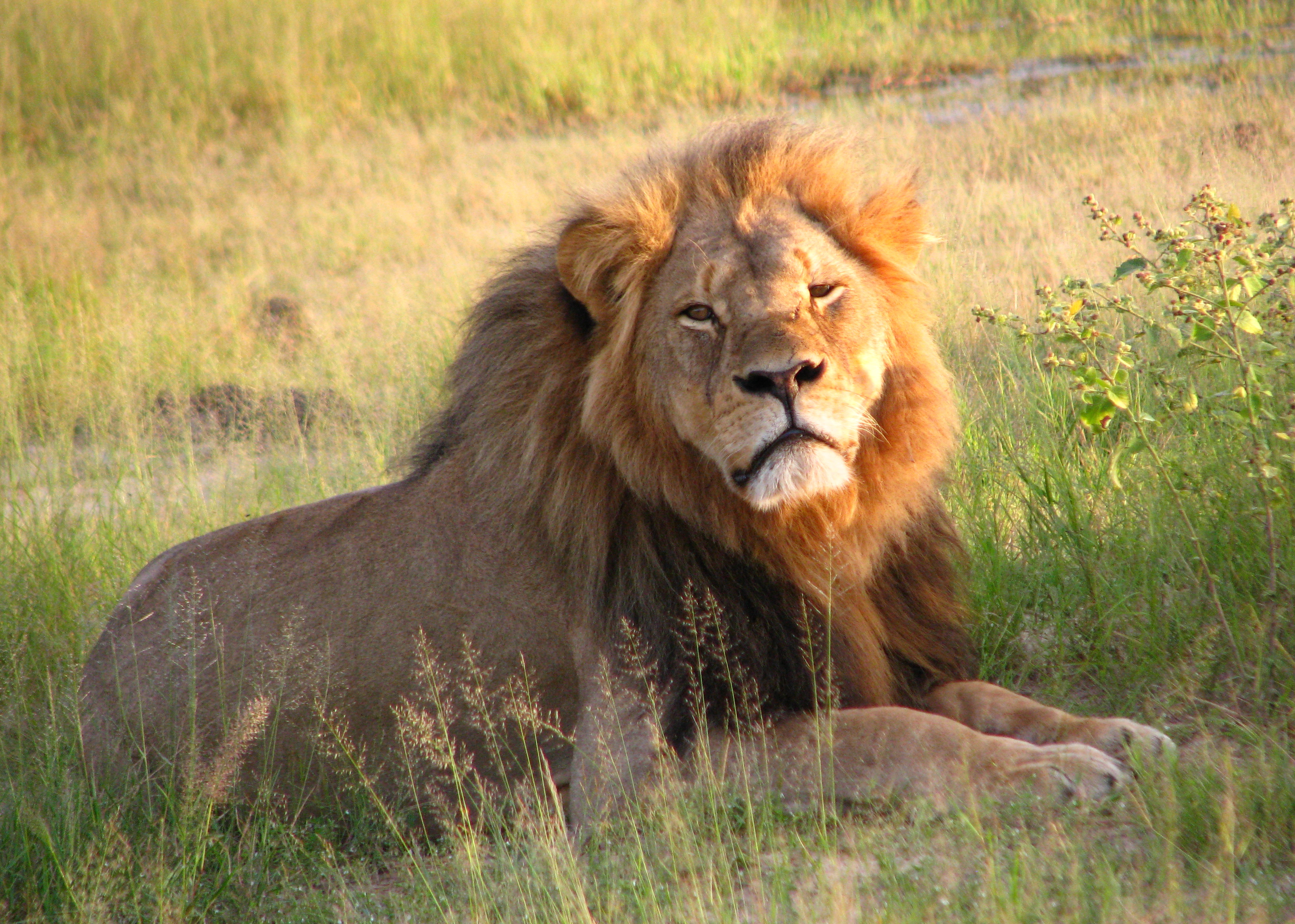
- Cecil in Hwange National Park (2010)
- Species: Lion (Panthera leo leo)
- Sex: Male
- Born: c. 2002
- Died: 2 July 2015 (aged 12–13); Hwange District, Zimbabwe
- Cause of death: Arrow wounds
- Known for: Tourist attraction Study by the University of Oxford; Death
- Residence: Hwange National Park
- Named after: Cecil Rhodes

Cecil (c. 2002 – 2 July 2015) was a male African lion (Panthera leo leo) who lived primarily in the Hwange National Park in Matabeleland North, Zimbabwe. He was being studied and tracked by a research team of the University of Oxford as part of a long-term study.

On the night of 1 July 2015, Cecil was wounded with an arrow by Walter Palmer, an American recreational big-game trophy hunter, then tracked and killed with a compound bow the following morning, between 10 and 12 hours later. Cecil was 13 years old when killed. Palmer had purchased a hunting permit and was not charged legally with any crime; authorities in Zimbabwe have said he is still free to visit the country as a tourist, but not as a hunter. Two Zimbabweans (the hunting guide and the owner of the farm where the hunt took place) were briefly arrested, but the charges were eventually dismissed by courts.

The killing was first reported by South African wildlife investigative reporter Adam Cruise writing for Conservation Action Trust. It resulted in international media attention and caused outrage among animal conservationists, criticism by politicians and celebrities, and a strong denunciation of Palmer. Five months after the killing of Cecil, the U.S. Fish and Wildlife Service added lions in India and West and Central Africa to the endangered species list, making it more difficult for United States citizens to kill them legally on safaris. Wayne Pacelle, then President of the HSUS, argued that Cecil had "changed the atmospherics on the issue of trophy hunting around the world", adding, "I think it gave less wiggle room to regulators."

Because of the high level of media attention and condemnation surrounding the killing of Cecil, significantly fewer hunters came to Zimbabwe in the months that followed. This led to the country suffering financial losses and a lion overpopulation in the Bubye Valley Conservancy.

== Background ==
Cecil was named after the British businessman, politician and mining magnate Cecil Rhodes, the namesake also of Rhodesia, now Zimbabwe. Another lion thought to be Cecil's brother was noticed in Hwange National Park in 2008. During 2009, the two lions encountered an established pride, which resulted in a fight in which Cecil's brother was killed, and both Cecil and the pride leader were seriously wounded; the previous leader was subsequently mercy-killed by park rangers because of the wounds sustained during the fight with Cecil. Cecil retreated to another part of the park where he eventually established his own pride with as many as 22 members. During 2013, Cecil was forced out from the area by two young male lions and into the eastern border of the park. There, he created a coalition with another male lion named Jericho to establish two prides that consisted of Cecil, Jericho, half a dozen females and up to a dozen cubs sired by either Cecil or Jericho.

The lions in the park, including Cecil, have been studied by scientists from the Wildlife Conservation Research Unit at the University of Oxford as part of a scientific project that has run since 1999, and his movements had been followed since 2008. Of the 62 lions tagged during the study period, 34 have died, including 24 through sport hunting. Of adult male lions that were tagged inside the park, 72% were killed through sport hunting on areas near the park. During 2013, 49 hunted lion carcasses were exported from Zimbabwe as trophies; the 2005–2008 Zimbabwe hunt "off-take" (licensed kills) average was 42 lions per year. The African Wildlife Foundation (AWF) found that the African lion population had decreased by forty-three percent from 1997 to 2017. The African Lion now has a conservation status of "vulnerable" with humans being its only predator.

Cecil was identifiable by his black-fringed mane and a GPS tracking collar, and was Hwange Park's main attraction. One of the researchers on the project suggested that Cecil had become so popular because he was accustomed to people, allowing vehicles to approach sometimes as close as 10 metres (11 yd), making it easy for tourists and researchers to photograph and observe him. According to Alex Magaisa, an advisor to Zimbabwean Prime Minister Morgan Tsvangirai, Cecil was known only to a segment of society; some sources claimed 99.99 percent of Zimbabweans had never heard of Cecil.

== Death ==
During June 2015, Walter J. Palmer, an American dentist and recreational game hunter, reportedly paid US$50,000 to a Zimbabwean professional hunter-guide, Theo Bronkhorst, to enable him to kill a lion. In the late afternoon of 1 July, Bronkhorst and wildlife tracker Cornelius Ncube built a hunting blind in Atoinette Farm, a private property owned by Honest Ndlovu just across a railway track from the park. Between 9:00 and 11:00 p.m., Palmer shot from concealment and critically wounded Cecil with an arrow from his compound bow. The hunters tracked Cecil and killed him with a second arrow the next morning (about 10 to 12 hours later) at a location less than 250 metres (270 yd) from the initial shot. Cecil's body was then skinned and his head was removed. When the lion's headless skeleton, already scavenged by vultures, was eventually found by park investigators, his tracking collar was also missing and later found dumped kilometers away. The hunt took place outside the protected Hwange National Park, but within the lion's normal home range. Biologist Andrew Loveridge alleged that Palmer's companions (Bronkhorst and Ncube) dragged the carcass of an African elephant killed earlier in the week to roughly 300 metres (330 yd) from the park to bait Cecil out of the protected area.

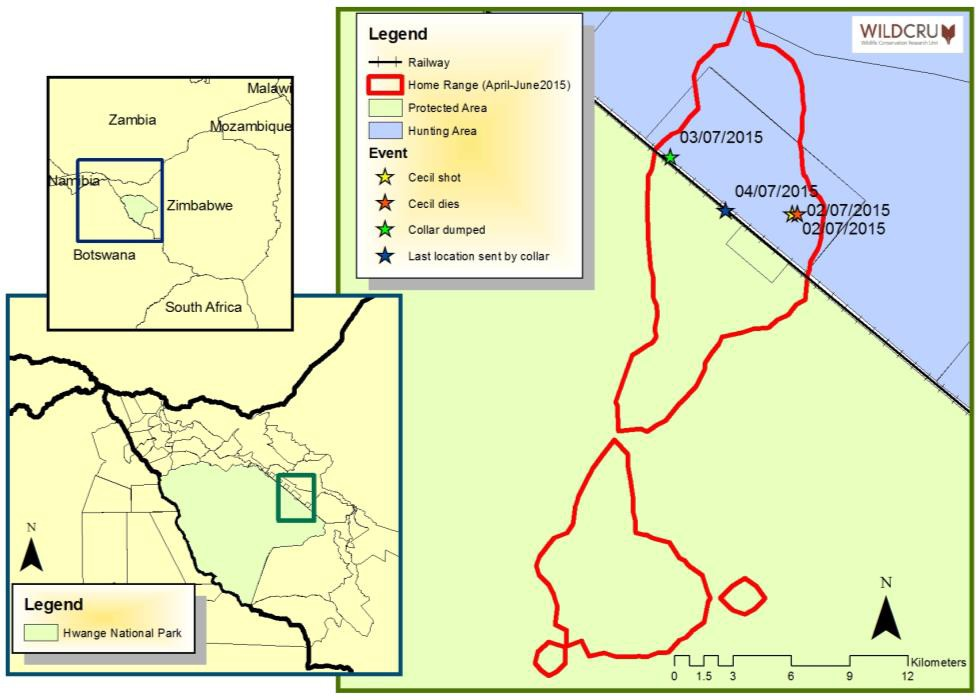
Map of Cecil's movement

The lion was equipped with a satellite tracking device from which location data were recorded every 2 hours. Subsequently, location data was pieced together (depicted in the map herein on the right). This interpretation of events was corroborated by the subsequent investigation by Zimbabwe National Parks and wildlife management and is consistent with the satellite data.

Bronkhorst and Ndlovu were later arrested by Zimbabwe police. Bronkhorst said during July, 2015, "We had obtained the permit for bowhunting, we had obtained the permit for the lion from the council." Palmer had already returned to the United States, where he issued a statement that he had "relied on the expertise of my local professional guides to ensure a legal hunt" and "deeply regret that my pursuit of an activity I love and practice responsibly and legally resulted in the taking of this lion".

== Reactions ==
=== In Zimbabwe ===
Cecil's killing went largely unnoticed in the animal's native Zimbabwe. The country's The Chronicle newspaper wrote: "It is not an overstatement that almost 99.99 percent of Zimbabweans didn't know about this animal until Monday. Now we have just learnt, thanks to the British media, that we had Africa's most famous lion all along, an icon!" The BBC's Farai Sevenzo wrote: "The lion's death has not registered much with the locals".

On the other hand, Zimbabwean officials stated that the killing of Cecil had already caused a decrease in tourism revenues. A significant decrease was noted in Hwange, where the lion had lived. Many international tourists who had planned to see the lion had cancelled their trips. "This killing is a huge loss to our tourism sector that was contributing immensely to the national wealth", said Emanuel Fundira, the president of the Safari Operators Association of Zimbabwe. "We had a lot of people, in terms of visitors, coming in to the country to enjoy and view Cecil, so really this was a great loss," Fundira said, calling Cecil's presence "a draw card" and comparing his death to "the demise of an icon". The director of the Zimbabwe Tourism Authority, Karikoga Kaseke, said that tourism had been booming, but that Zimbabwe was now perceived as a country which was not interested in protecting and promoting animal rights, and this view had also hindered tourism.

Bryan Orford, a professional wildlife guide who worked in Hwange, calculated that with tourists from a nearby lodge collectively paying US$9,800 per day, the revenue generated from photography of Cecil taken over a five day trip would have been greater than someone paying a one-off fee of US$45,000 to hunt and kill the lion, with no hope of future revenue.

On 1 August 2015, in response to Cecil's killing, the hunting of lions, leopards and elephants along with all bow-hunting was immediately suspended in areas outside of Hwange National Park by Zimbabwe's environment minister, Opa Muchinguri, who said, "All such hunts will only be conducted if confirmed and authorized in writing by the Director-general of the Zimbabwe Parks and Wildlife Management Authority, and only if accompanied by parks staff whose costs will be met by the landowner". The moratorium was lifted after 10 days.

Zimbabwe's acting information minister, Prisca Mupfumira, when questioned about Cecil's killing, asked, "What lion?".

At a press conference on 31 July 2015, Zimbabwe's environment minister, Opa Muchinguri, said the hunter violated Zimbabwean law and needs to be held accountable. "We are appealing to the responsible authorities for his extradition to Zimbabwe". Muchinguri said in a press release that Palmer's actions had tarnished the image of Zimbabwe and placed further strain on the relationship between Zimbabwe and the U.S. She suggested conservationists and animal lovers provide resources to help decrease poaching and other environmental concerns in Zimbabwe.

=== In Africa ===
Under the premise that profits from trophy hunts help animal conservation efforts, Pohamba Shifeta, the Namibian environment and tourism minister, said that these measures by foreigners to curtail prize hunting would "be the end of conservation in Namibia."

Jacob Zuma, the president of South Africa at the time, declared on 11 August 2015: "What it sounds like from a distance [is] that the hunter did not know that Cecil was so popular, just saw a lion, and killed a lion, and it's Cecil, and Cecil is very well loved and it caused a problem, because everyone wants to go and see Cecil. I think it's just an incident."

Jean Kapata, Zambia's minister of tourism, said that "the West seemed more concerned with the welfare of a lion in Zimbabwe than of Africans themselves", and added, "In Africa, a human being is more important than an animal. I don't know about the Western world."

=== Overseas ===
==== Non-governmental ====
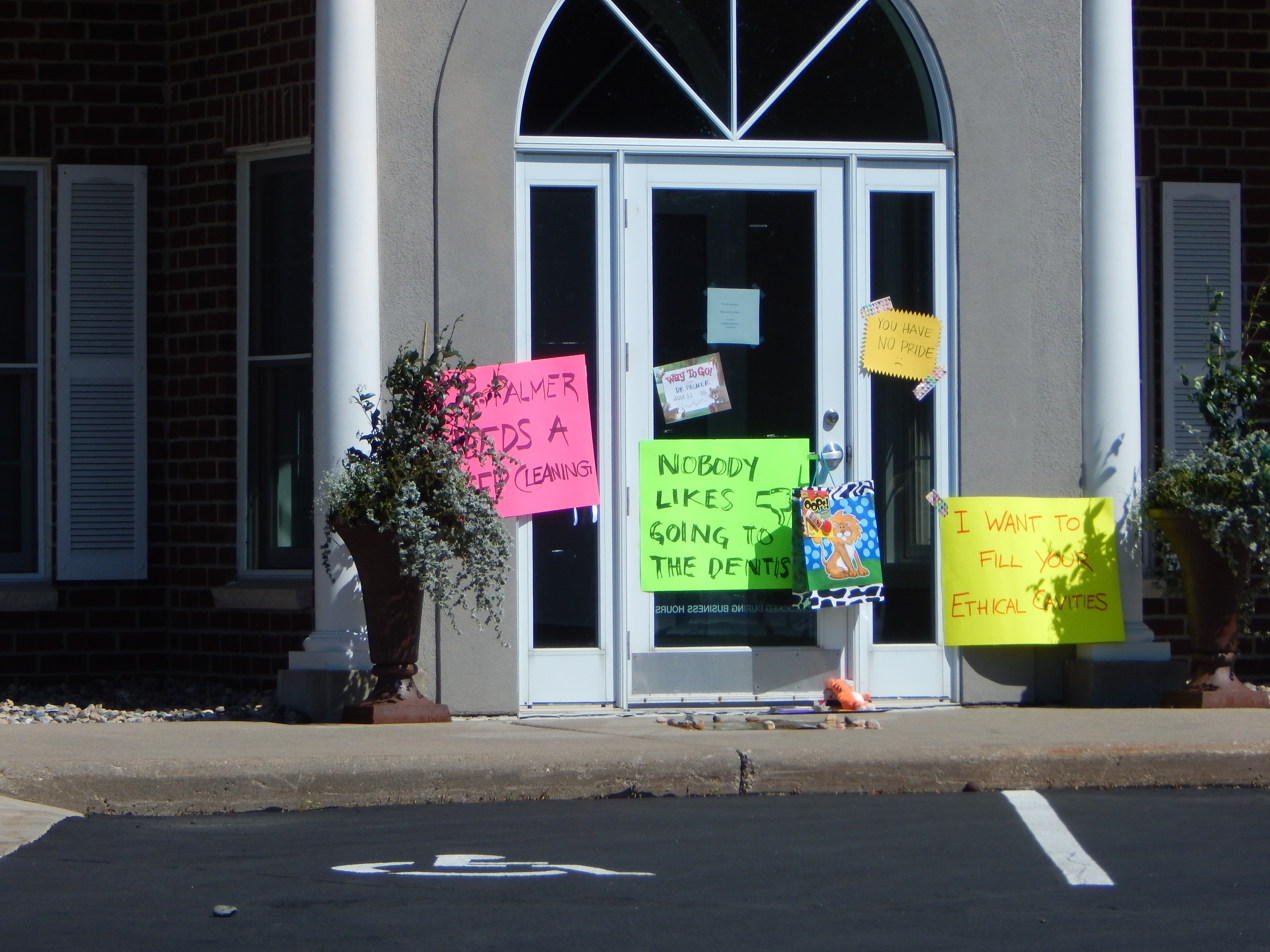
Activist placards at Palmer's dental practice

Cecil's killing created an outrage among animal conservationists, and prompted responses from politicians and many other people. A number of celebrities publicly condemned Cecil's killing. Palmer received a large number of death threats and hate messages, and activists posted his private details online. The words "Lion Killer" were also spray-painted on the garage door at Palmer's Florida vacation home. In addition, at least seven pickled pigs feet were left at the residence. Artists from around the world dedicated art to Cecil, including Aaron Blaise, a former artist of Walt Disney Feature Animation. Musicians composed original works to honor Cecil. After Mia Farrow received criticism for tweeting Palmer's office address, Bob Barker defended her action, saying, "The animal rights movement has just made humongous strides. Why? Awareness. That is what it takes, we have to make people aware," he told ET. "They don't realize how much suffering is going on in the animal world."

Not all overseas reactions were sympathetic to Cecil. Goodwell Nzou, an African PhD student in the U.S., wrote in The New York Times: "In my village in Zimbabwe, surrounded by wildlife conservation areas, no lion has ever been beloved, or granted an affectionate nickname. They are objects of terror. [...] Americans care more about African animals than about African people."

The killing of Cecil sparked a discussion among conservation organisations about the ethics and business of big-game hunting and a proposal for bills banning imports of lion trophies to the U.S. and European Union. These discussions convinced three of the largest airlines in the U.S., American, Delta and United, to voluntarily ban the transport of hunting trophies. Activists also asked African countries to ban bow hunting, lion baiting, and hunting from hunting blinds. Global media and social media reaction resulted in close to 1.2 million people signing the online petition "Justice for Cecil", which asked Zimbabwe's government to stop issuing hunting permits for endangered animals.

Safari Club International responded by suspending both Palmer's and Bronkhorst's memberships, stating: "those who intentionally take wildlife illegally should be prosecuted and punished to the maximum extent allowed by law." Late-night talk-show host Jimmy Kimmel, choking up as he described the incident, helped raise US$150,000 in donations in less than 24 hours for Oxford's Wildlife Conservation Research Unit, which had long been "responsible for tracking Cecil's activity and location".

The press saw similarities between Cecil and Harambe, the zoo gorilla killed about a year later. "Harambe is the de facto emotional successor of Cecil the Lion", according to a CNN report. Outside magazine asked what Cecil the Lion can teach us about the killing of Harambe. Vox noted the deaths were alike in that they generated "a huge swell of social media backlash" and a "mob justice mechanism".

==== Government officials ====
Some government officials publicly condemned the killing of Cecil. David Cameron, then Prime Minister of the United Kingdom, told reporters that the United Kingdom plays "a leading role in preventing illegal wildlife trade", when he was asked about Cecil's death. Grant Shapps, his Minister of State at the Department for International Development, described the incident as "barbaric hunting".

U.S. Congresswoman Betty McCollum of Minnesota, co-chair of the United States Congressional International Conservation Caucus, suggested an investigation of Palmer and the killing.

U.S. Senator Bob Menendez introduced the Conserving Ecosystems by Ceasing the Importation of Large (CECIL) Animal Trophies Act, which "extend[s] the import and export protections for a species listed under the Endangered Species Act to those that have been proposed for listing, thereby prohibiting the import of any trophies gleaned from Cecil's killing without explicitly obtaining a permit from the Secretary of the Interior." The bill was cosponsored by Senators Cory Booker, Richard Blumenthal, and Ben Cardin.

On 30 July 2015, the United Nations General Assembly in New York adopted a non-binding resolution to strengthen the efforts to address illicit wildlife poaching and trafficking. Germany and Gabon were the sponsors of the resolution. Harald Braun, Germany's U.N. Ambassador, and Gabon's Foreign Minister Emmanuel Issoze-Ngondet associated the resolution with the killing. Said Braun: "Like most people in the world we are outraged at what happened to this poor lion;" Issoze-Ngondet added that Cecil's killing was "a matter of deep concern for all countries in Africa".

== Criminal investigations ==
On 7 July 2015, law enforcement officers of the Zimbabwe Parks and Wildlife Management Authority commenced an investigation after receiving information that a lion had been killed illegally on a farm near Hwange National Park. The Authority charged that a lion had been killed illegally on the farm on 1 July 2015.

On 29 July 2015, Bronkhorst appeared in court at Victoria Falls and pleaded not guilty to a charge of "failing to prevent an unlawful hunt". He was granted bail at US$1,000 and was ordered to appear back in court on 5 August. Bronkhorst stated: "Palmer is a totally innocent party to this whole thing, and he has conducted and bought a hunt from me that was legitimate." Zimbabwe National Parks said in a statement that quotas are assigned to given areas and that Cecil was shot in an area without a quota for lion kills. On 5 August 2015, the case was adjourned until 28 September, when Bronkhorst's barrister was next available. On 11 November 2016, the High Court in the city of Bulawayo threw out the charges against Bronkhorst, agreeing with the defense that it could not have been a crime under the country's wildlife laws if Palmer had a legal permit to hunt.

While one account said Honest Ndlovu, who occupies the land on which Cecil was killed, was charged on 29 July 2015 with allowing an illegal hunt on his land, his attorney said two days later that Ndlovu had not been, with parks officials saying days afterward that he would be charged after first testifying for the state. On 18 August 2015, prosecutors brought an illegal-hunting charge against Ndlovu. The charges against Ndlovu were dismissed.

Palmer left Zimbabwe for the United States after the hunt. He indicated that he would cooperate with authorities in the investigation. On 30 July 2015, the U.S. Fish and Wildlife Service was searching for Palmer as part of its investigation. He contacted them voluntarily through a representative on the same day.

On 6 September 2015, Palmer said he would return to his dentist practice on 9 September, and that he had not been charged in the United States nor Zimbabwe with any crime related to Cecil's killing nor had he been contacted by authorities. However, he had previously been convicted of fish and game violations in Minnesota. On 12 October, Zimbabwe government officials said Palmer's papers were in order and Palmer would not be charged with any crime. They said he was free to return to Zimbabwe as a tourist but not as a hunter.

== Consequences for the pride ==
When one or more new male lions oust or replace a previous male(s) associated with a pride, they often kill any existing young cubs, a form of infanticide. Initially, both the University of Oxford study and Johnny Rodrigues, head of the Zimbabwe Conservation Task Force, indicated that they believed Cecil's six cubs could be killed by the new dominant male in the pride. In a later interview, however, Rodrigues said Jericho had assumed control of the pride but had not killed Cecil's cubs, and that he was also keeping the cubs safe from any rivals.

=== Reactions to the killing of Xanda ===
Xanda, a son of Cecil's, was legally shot by trophy hunters in Zimbabwe on 20 July 2017. He was six years old and the father of several young cubs. The killing provoked reactions, not just amongst advocates of animal rights. The BBC termed it a "sad" inheritance from Cecil. Andrew Loveridge, from the University of Oxford's Department of Zoology, said the hunter was "one of the 'good' guys. He is ethical", adding that Xanda's hunt "was legal and Xanda was over 6 years old so it is all within the stipulated regulations". The University of Oxford's Department of Zoology called for a "no-hunting zone" around Hwange Park, spanning 5.0 km (3.1 miles).

== Subsequent conservation measures ==
Five months after the killing of Cecil, the U.S. Fish and Wildlife Service added the Panthera leo leo subspecies of lions, in India and western and central Africa, to the endangered species list. The listings would make it more difficult (though not impossible) for US citizen hunters to legally kill these protected lions. According to Wayne Pacelle, president of the Humane Society of the United States and who petitioned for the new listing, Cecil had "changed the atmospherics on the issue of trophy hunting around the world," adding "I think it gave less wiggle room to regulators." Wayne added that he thought the killing of Cecil was "a defining moment" resulting in the new protections. Jeff Flocken, regional director of the International Fund for Animal Welfare, said that while the U.S.F.W.S. decision was not the direct result of the death of Cecil, "it would be impossible to ignore the public outcry" and its effect on worldwide opinion. The New York Times, writing about the new regulations, said "the killing of Cecil .. seemed to galvanize public attention."

Other countries and companies have also taken action. After Cecil's killing, France banned the importation of lion trophies. The Netherlands did so in 2016. A British ban was still stalled in 2020, with more than 150 trophies imported since 2015.

The investigative journalist George Knapp noted Cecil's case on the approach of the incident's one-year anniversary during an annual animal-welfare broadcast concerning issues, the development of law, animal cruelty, and remediation efforts in June 2016. The 2016 broadcast covered various issues, including horses and trophy hunting, noting Cecil and the effect the incident was still causing at the date of the show. Money raised in response to Cecil's death has been used by researchers to reduce conflicts between people and lions by paying for lion protectors and other methods.

=== "Cecil effect" ===
The "Cecil effect" is a term used by some to describe the fact that after the killing of Cecil, there was a significant reduction in the number of hunters coming to Zimbabwe and a subsequent increase in lion populations in certain areas. Byron du Preez, project leader at the Bubye Valley Conservancy, believes the effect does not exist, saying, "Hunters are not coming because there is a massive recession [in the U.S.]." Those who believe in the effect say hunters are staying away from Zimbabwe due to fear of negative publicity. About a month after Cecil was killed, when international uproar was at its peak, Zimbabwean hunting guide Quinn Swales was killed by a lion on a hunt. Some of his fellow guides speculated that he was afraid of shooting the animal out of fear of possible backlash. According to guide Steve Taylor, "This guy was a really successful guide, and he [was killed] by a lion. And I think that's the Cecil Effect. Guides in Zimbabwe are petrified of having the world turn on them."

Some attribute the Cecil effect as being responsible for an unsustainably high lion population in the Bubye Valley Conservancy, which negatively affects the conservancy's population of the park's wildlife such as antelopes, giraffes, cheetahs, rhinos, leopards, and painted dogs; and possibly requiring a lion cull of up to 200 felines. Others noted that 2015 was the driest summer on record, which kept grass low and made game animals easy targets for lions.

== Books and other media ==
In the children's book Cecil's Pride (2016), author Craig Hatkoff and his daughters sought to shed light on Cecil's life and how he lived prior to his death. He reached out to those who studied Cecil's pride at Zimbabwe's Hwange National Park and got into contact with Cecil's 'biographer', researcher Brent Stapelkamp. Stapelkamp had studied Cecil for over 9 years and had accumulated photographs that were used as illustrations in the book that capture the complexities of the pride. The book highlights the relationship of Cecil and an unrelated male named Jericho who becomes co-leader with Cecil and then leader after Cecil's death.

Andrew Loveridge, in his book Lion Hearted: The Life and Death of Cecil & the Future of Africa's Iconic Cats (2018), suggests that the hunters allowed Cecil to suffer for more than 10 hours, without hastening his death with a firearm, possibly to allow Palmer to submit the game to a hunting record book as an archery-hunted animal. Loveridge further suggests that Bronkhost, knowing that he had no quota to hunt in the area, attempted to deliberately conceal the hunt by removing Cecil's skinned carcass and disabling his collar. However, the High Court set aside the charges against Bronkhorst.

In 2021, National Geographic Channel aired a documentary produced by wildlife filmmaker Peter Lamberti from Lion Mountain Media, Cecil: The Legacy of a King.

This case was referenced in a 9-1-1 television series episode, the theme of this episode being people getting punished for their bad decisions and actions; the episode keeps referring to it as karma. In the episode a dentist, who received massive public attention after killing a protected lion, is attacked and killed after taunting a tiger at the zoo to get a good picture.

In February 2026 Channel 4 in the UK broadcast "Cecil: the Lion and the Dentist" The life and death of Africa's biggest lion. The Born Free foundation commented on the program.

== See also ==
- Big five game
- Game law
- International Anti-Poaching Foundation
- Loonkito, one of the world's oldest lions killed by herders
- Other killings of popular wild animals by hunters:
  - Pedals (bear)
  - Romeo (wolf)
  - Vince (rhinoceros): killed by poachers near Paris
  - Rare 'big tusker' elephant killed by Leon Kachelhoffer
