= Romeo (wolf) =

American wolf near Juneau, Alaska (c. 2003–2009)

- Species: Gray wolf (Canis lupus)
- Sex: Male
- Born: c. 2003; Alaska
- Died: 2009 (aged 8–9); Alaska
- Nationality: American
- Years active: 6
- Known for: Gentle-mannered interactions with humans and dogs
- Residence: Mendenhall Valley, Juneau, Alaska
- Appearance: black
- Named after: Romeo

Romeo (c. 2003 – 2009) was a black wolf who lived in the Mendenhall Valley, near Juneau, Alaska. He was known for his friendly interactions with dogs and people.

== Summary ==
Romeo was an Alexander Archipelago wolf (Canis lupus ligoni, a subspecies of gray wolf) who lived around Mendenhall Glacier between 2003 and 2009. He interacted more or less successfully with locals, tourists, cross-country skiers, and their dogs for six years up until he was killed by poachers at the age of eight or nine years.

== Books about Romeo ==
- Romeo, The Story of an Alaskan Wolf, John Hyde, Bunker Hill Publishing, 2010, ISBN 1593730888
- The Glacier Wolf - True Stories of Life in Southeast Alaska, Nick Jans, Arctic Images, 2009, ISBN 0615278701
  - Nick Jans, A Wolf Called Romeo, Mariner Books (March 17, 2015), trade paperback, 288 pages, ISBN 978-0544228092
- Deb Vanasse (Author), Nancy Slagle (Illustrator), Black Wolf of the Glacier: Alaska's Romeo, ISBN 1602231974

== See also ==
- List of wolves
- Other killings of popular wild animals by hunters:
  - Pedals (bear)
  - Cecil the lion
  - Vince (rhinoceros)
