= Bait =

Attracts prey when hunting or fishing

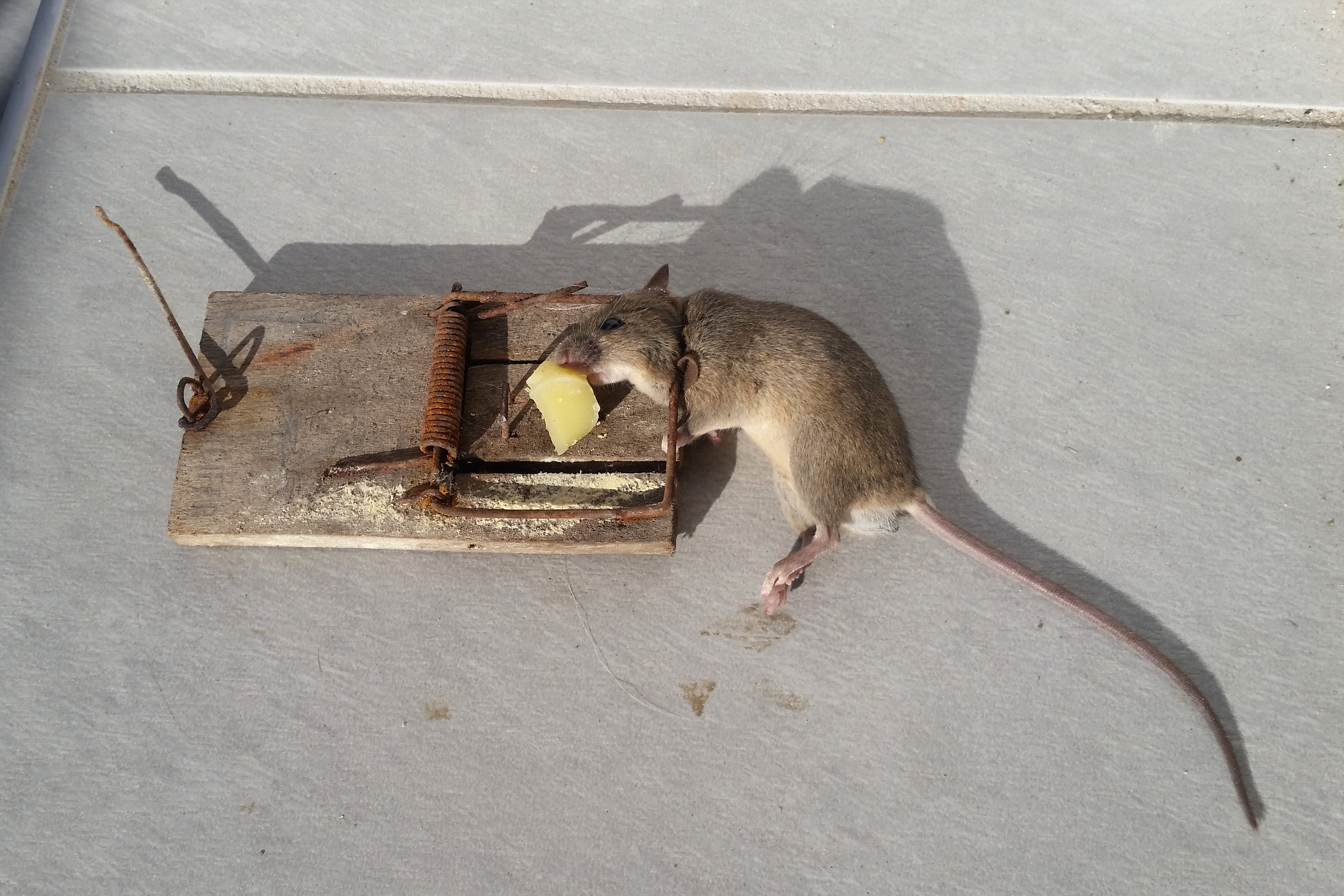
A piece of cheese used as bait on a mousetrap

Bait is any appetizing substance (e.g. food) used to attract prey when hunting or fishing, most commonly in the form of trapping (e.g. mousetrap and bird trap), ambushing (e.g. from a hunting blind) and angling.

Baiting is a ubiquitous practice in both recreational (especially angling) and commercial fishing, but the use of live bait can be deemed illegal under certain fisheries law and local jurisdictions. For hunting, however, baiting can often be controversial as it violates the principles of fair chase, although it is still a commonly accepted practice in varmint hunting, culling and pest control.

== Uses ==
=== Fishing ===
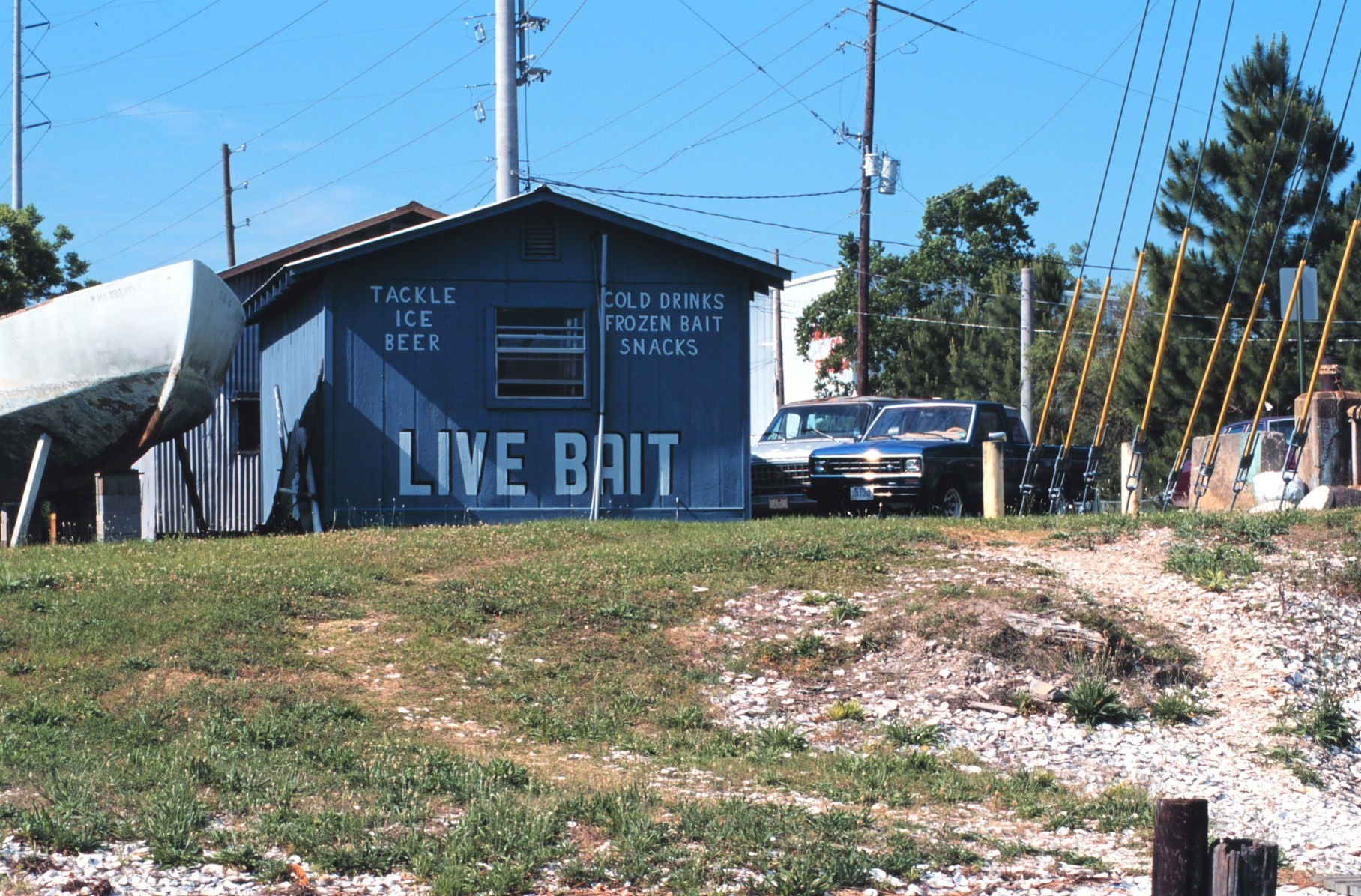
Live bait and fishing supply store

Baiting is ubiquitously practised to catching fish. Traditionally, nightcrawlers, small baitfish, insect adults and larvae have been used as standard hookbait, and offals are commonly used as groundbait (a.k.a. chumming) in blue water fishing. Modern fishermen have also begun using more plastic bait and lures, and more recently, electronic bionic baits, to attract the more territorial and aggressive predatory fishes. Because of the risk of transmitting Myxobolus cerebralis (whirling disease), trout and salmon should not be used as bait. There are various types of natural saltwater bait. Studies show that natural baits like croaker and shrimp are better recognized therefore more readily accepted by fish. The best bait for red drum (red fish) are [ pogy (menhaden) and, in the fall, specks like croaker.

=== Hunting ===
Baiting is a common practice in leopard hunting on a safari. A dead, smaller-sized antelope is usually placed high in the tree to lure the otherwise overcautious leopard. The hunter either watches the bait from point within firing range or stalks the animal if it has come for the bait during the night.

In areas where bears are hunted, bait can be found for sale at gas stations and hunting supply stores. Often consisting of some sweet substance, such as frosting or molasses, combined with an aromatic like rotten meat or fish, the bait is spread and the hunter waits under cover for his prey.

Cecil the Lion, who was poached by an American trophy bowhunter in 2015, was baited out of the protected area into an ambush at the margin of a private land by a deliberately planted elephant carcass.

=== Pest control ===
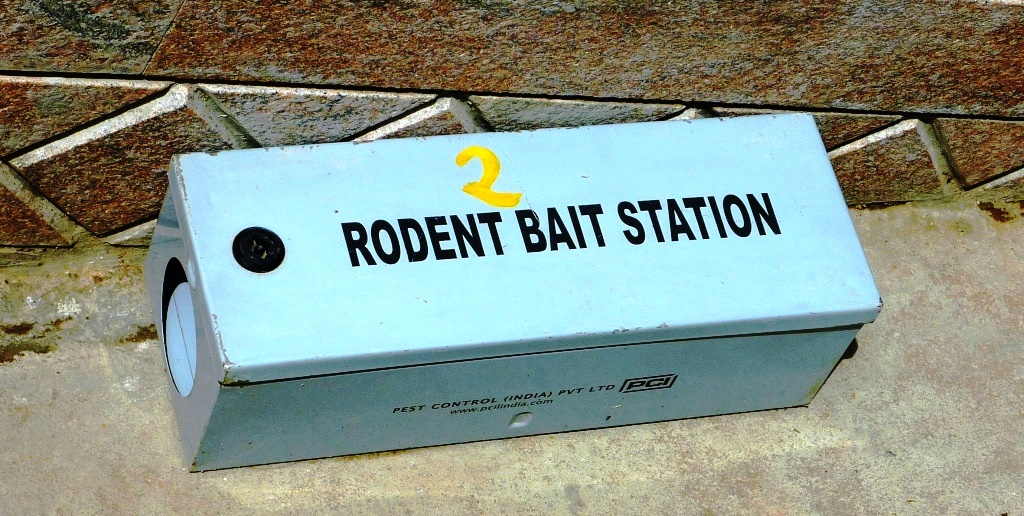
Rodent bait station, Chennai, India

Poisoned bait is a common method for controlling rats, mice, birds, slugs, snails, ants, cockroaches, and other pests. The basic granules, or other formulation, contains a food attractant for the target species and a suitable poison. For ants, a slow-acting toxin is needed so that the workers have time to carry the substance back to the colony, and for flies, a quick-acting substance to prevent further egg-laying and nuisance. Baits for slugs and snails often contain the molluscide metaldehyde, dangerous to children and household pets.

== Legal usage ==
=== In Australia ===
Baiting in Australia refers to specific campaigns to control foxes, wild dogs and dingos by poisoning in areas where they are a problem. These programs are held in conjunction with the local Department of Primary Industries, Rural Lands Protection Board (RLPB) and National Parks and Wildlife Service (NPWS) to facilitate a neighbourhood baiting campaign.

Australian hunters often use carcasses when hunting feral pigs. Shot feral animals are often left in the field, and the decaying smell attracts more pigs to scavenge over the subsequent days.

== See also ==
- Fishing bait
  - Groundbait/chumming, large quantities of loose bait used to "appetize" an area and attract fish
  - Fishing lure, a type of imitation bait used to deceive and provoke strikes from predatory fishes
- Honeypot
- Rubby dubby
