= Vanasse =

Vanasse is a surname. Notable people with the surname include:

- Deb Vanasse (born 1957), Alaskan writer
- Fabien Vanasse dit Vertefeuille (1850–1936), Canadian journalist, lawyer and politician
- Karine Vanasse (born 1983), Canadian actress
- René Vanasse (1921–1996), Canadian businessman
- Bob Vanasse, co-founder of Vanasse Hangen Brustlin, Inc.
