= Pedals (bear) =

Bear who became an internet celebrity

- Species: American black bear (Ursus americanus)
- Died: October 2016; New Jersey
- Known for: Videos of the bear were posted on the internet
- Residence: Oak Ridge, New Jersey

Pedals (died October 2016, New Jersey, United States) was an American black bear (Ursus americanus) that walked upright on its hind legs because of injuries on its front paws. After videos of the bear were posted on the internet, more than 300,000 people signed a petition to move the bear to a wildlife sanctuary. However, Pedals appears to have been one of hundreds of bears killed by bullets or arrows in October 2016 in New Jersey's first sanctioned bow-and-arrow hunt in four decades.

== Fame ==
Pedals was first spotted walking upright in 2014 in Oak Ridge, New Jersey, spurring debate and discussions. Videos of Pedals' bipedal walking were posted to the internet and he was described as an "internet sensation". Officials initially warned that the videos might be a hoax.

Over 300,000 people concerned with Pedals' welfare signed a petition written by Lisa Rose Rublack to relocate the bear to the Orphaned Wildlife Center in Otisville, New York. Supporters donated $22,000 to a fund created by Sabrina Pugsley to move the bear to the sanctuary to prevent it from struggling to survive in the wild. New York officials opposed the transfer of Pedals to the sanctuary.

Pedals was being monitored by the New Jersey Department of Environmental Protection's Division of Fish and Wildlife, which asked residents to report sightings by calling a hotline and announced in 2016 that the bear had not been seen since the previous Christmas.

== Death ==
Pedals' internet fame led Angi Metler, director of the Bear Education and Resource Group, to believe he would be targeted by bear hunters. In October 2016, reports of Pedals being killed by a hunter received widespread attention. On October 17, 2016, the New Jersey Department of Environmental Protection announced they believed Pedals had been killed during the officially sanctioned hunt. The October 10–15 hunt was New Jersey's first sanctioned bow and arrow hunt since the 1960s. During the hunt, which also permitted muzzle-loading rifles, a total of 562 bears were killed.

In response to the killing, State Senator Raymond Lesniak introduced a bill dubbed "Pedals' Law" that would ban black bear hunting in New Jersey for five years.

In December 2016, a hunter filed a defamation lawsuit in Morris County Superior Court alleging he was falsely accused on social media of being Pedals' killer, suffered death threats, and had his personal information published.

== See also ==
- List of individual bears
- Bear hunting
- Rare 'big tusker' elephant killed by Leon Kachelhoffer
