= Château de Thoiry =

Castle and zoo in Thoiry, France

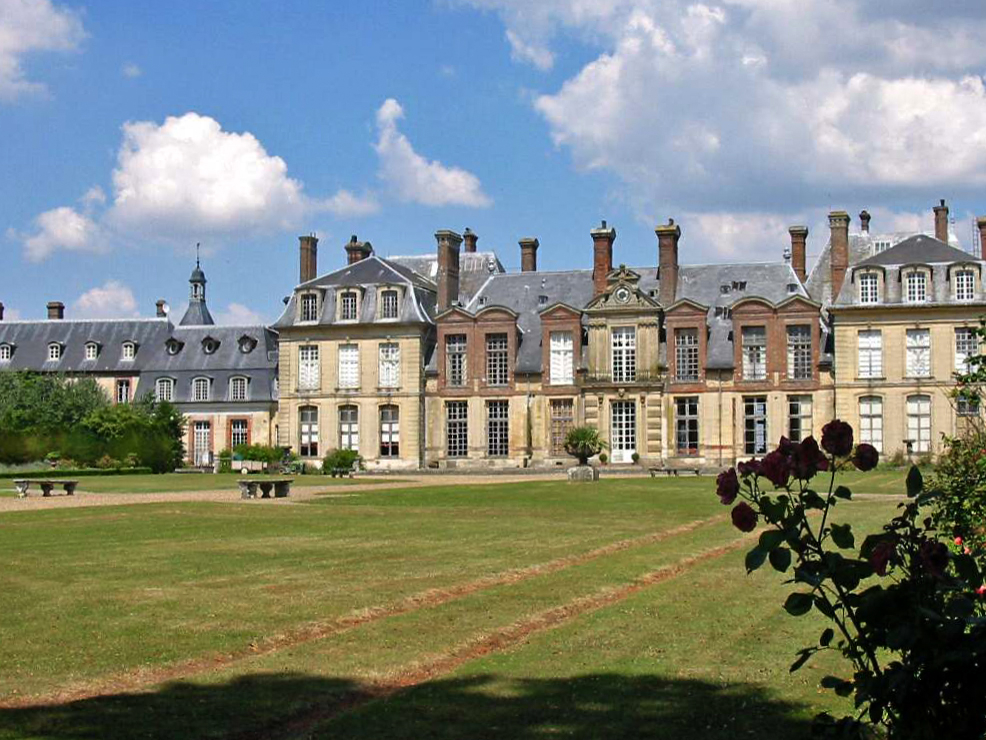
- The castle
- Interactive map of Château de Thoiry
- 48°51′50″N 1°47′45″E
- Date opened: 1965
- Location: Thoiry, France
- Land area: 150 ha (370 acres)
- No. of animals: 1,000
- No. of species: 130
- Website: www.thoiry.net/index.2.php?lang=en

The Château de Thoiry is a 150-hectare (370-acre) castle, zoo and botanical garden that was opened to the public in 1965 in the village of Thoiry, France, with gardens and a zoological park. Located about 30 miles (48 km) due west of Paris. Its popularity has continued to grow—by 1974, over 280,000 visitors per year were coming to see an assortment of 1,000 wild animals.

== Zoo ==
Many of the animals roam freely along an 8-kilometre (5.0 mi) road through the 240-acre (97 ha) "African Reserve". Others can be viewed in a walk-through zoo. Animals in the reserve include Przewalski's horse, bears, European and American bison, wildebeest, greater and lesser kudu, dromedary camels, zebras, giraffes, rhinos, hippos, eland, Watusi cattle, and three elephants.

Animals in the walk-through portion of the zoo include Siberian tigers, Eurasian lynx, snow leopards, lar gibbons, red pandas, ring-tailed lemurs, a colony of about 60 Tonkean macaques, cheetahs, reticulated python, wolves, pygmy goats, and Komodo dragons.

=== 2017 poaching incident ===
On March 7, 2017, a male Southern white rhinoceros named Vince was found shot dead with one horn removed and another partially sawn off. This was reported as being the first such live animal poaching at a European zoo. Thierry Duguet, the head of the zoo, said "There has never been a case like this in a zoo in Europe, an assault of such violence, evidently for this stupid trafficking of rhinoceros horns".

=== 2024 wolf attack ===
In June 2024, a 37-year-old woman was attacked and severely injured by three wolves at the zoo. The woman ventured into the American reserve area of the zoo on foot, an area typically accessible only by car. Despite signs and safety reminders in place, the woman entered the safari zone, where she was bitten on the neck, calf, and back by the wolves. At first, reports indicated her life was in danger, but later updates confirmed her injuries were no longer life-threatening.

== Other attractions ==
Other attractions at the château include a maze and several gardens.

The castle itself is still the home of the Counts of La Panouse, and parts of it are open to the public, with costumed guides leading the tour. The castle was built in the 16th century by Raoul Moreau, an alchemist and the treasurer of the King of France. It was designed by architect Philibert de L'Orme to be in perfect harmony with nature, and the center arch of the castle marks the position of the sun during the summer and winter solstices.
