= Loonkito =

Lion that lived in Kenya

Loonkito (February 2003/2004 – 10 May 2023) was a wild lion from Kenya.

== Biography ==
The Kenya Wildlife Service described Loonkito in 2021 as a "legendary feline warrior" having defended his territory for more than a decade. On 10th May of 2023, Loonkito was speared to death by Maasai herders near Olkelunyiet village for preying on livestock. Nine other lions were killed by herders during the week across the Amboseli National Park, following attacks on livestock. Loonkito was believed to be the world's oldest lion, as most lions live to around 13.

== See also ==
- Killing of Cecil the lion
