= Gail Giles =

American writer of young adult fiction

- Born: Galveston, Texas, U.S.
- Education: Stephen F. Austin State University
- Occupations: Teacher; Author
- Writing career
- Years active: 1997–present
- Genre: Young adult fiction
- Website: gailgiles.com

Gail Giles (born September 24 in Galveston, Texas) is an American writer of young adult fiction. She aims to write books about social issues that connect with a teen audience in a realistic way. She has won several awards for her work, including an ALA Best of the Best book. In 2014, she co-authored No Returns, the first in a series, with Deb Vanasse.

== Biography ==
Giles is a former high school teacher who grew up in Texas and now lives there with her husband, three dogs, and three cats. She has one son and two grandsons. She graduated from Stephen F. Austin State University. She studies English, speech, and drama.

== Career ==
Her novel Shattering Glass, was an ALA Best of the Best Book, a Book Sense 76 selection, and a Booklist Top 10 Mystery for Youth selection. The novel is about a high school boy named Simon Glass who is helped to become one of the most popular kids in school by other students, only to end in a tragic twist of fate.

Her second novel, Dead Girls Don't Write Letters, was an ALA Top 10 Quick pick (2003) and a Book Sense 76 selection. It is about a girl named Sunny whose older sister, Jazz, has recently died. She receives a letter in the mail supposedly from her sister. Following the letter, things get stranger and stranger. Dead Girls Don't Write Letters deals with profound physiological insight and provides the reader with much to ponder. Giles' third novel, Playing in Traffic (2003), is an epic story about a boy trying to help a gothic girl.

Her fourth book, What Happened to Cass McBride? (2006), deals with teen problems. It's about crime, death, torture, and suicide.

In September 2007, she published another teen novel, Right Behind You, about a boy who struggles with guilt after making a horrible mistake.

Dark Song, a fast-paced psychological thriller about a girl who falls hard for the wrong boy, was released on September 7, 2010.

No Returns, co-written with Deb Vanasse (Running Fox Books, 2014), is the first in a planned series, the Battleband Saga. It features a boy band that accidentally makes a deal with the devil. In a twist on the legend of Faust, the boys in the bands discover there's more at stake than their fame.

== Bibliography ==
=== Novels ===
- Breath of the Dragon (1998)
- Shattering Glass (2002)
- Dead Girls Don't Write Letters (2003)
- Playing in Traffic (2003)
- What Happened to Cass McBride? (2006)
- Right Behind You (2007)
- Dark Song (2010)
- Girls Like Us (2014)

=== Series ===
- No Returns (The Battleband Saga #1) (2014)

== Awards ==
- Shattering Glass, ALA Best of the Best Book
- Shattering Glass, Book Sense 76 selection
- Shattering Glass, Booklist Top 10 Mystery for Youth selection
- Dead Girls Don't Write Letters, ALA Top 10 Quick pick (2003)
- Dead Girls Don't Write Letters, Book Sense 76 selection
