= Bowhunting =

Hunting by archery

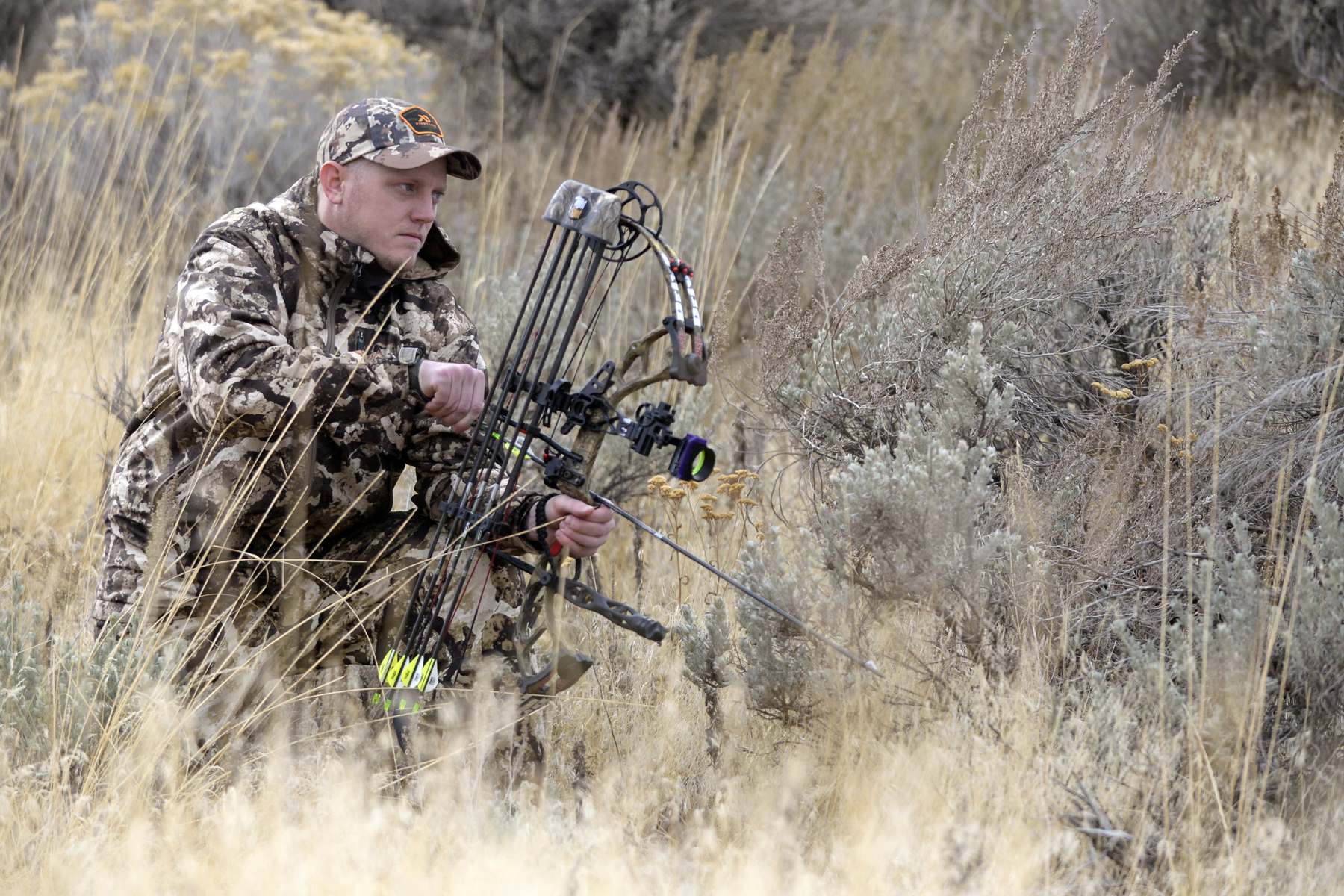
Bowhunter in Utah

Bowhunting (or bow hunting) is the practice of hunting game animals by archery. Many indigenous peoples have employed the technique as their primary hunting method for thousands of years, and it has survived into contemporary use for sport and hunting.

== Modern history ==
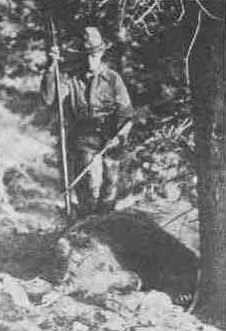
Picture of Pope taken while grizzly hunting at Yellowstone

The last of the Yahi tribe, an indigenous man known as Ishi, came out of hiding in California in 1911. His doctor, Saxton Pope, learned many of Ishi's traditional archery skills, and popularized them. The Pope and Young Club, founded in 1961 and named in honor of Pope and his friend, Arthur Young, became one of North America's leading bowhunting and conservation organizations. Founded as a nonprofit scientific organization, the club was patterned after the Boone and Crockett Club and advocated responsible bowhunting by promoting quality, fair chase hunting, and sound conservation practices. Modern game archery owes much of its success to Fred Bear, an American bow hunter and bow manufacturer.

== Equipment ==
Arrows, bows and sights are commonly of the more modern varieties. However, all effective variations, including crossbows and wooden bows launching wooden arrows with stone points, are used. Arrowheads are chosen to ensure lethality. Broadheads feature blades that jut out from the shaft at an angle to cause more damage to the target; some models have retractable blades that only deploy once they hit the target.

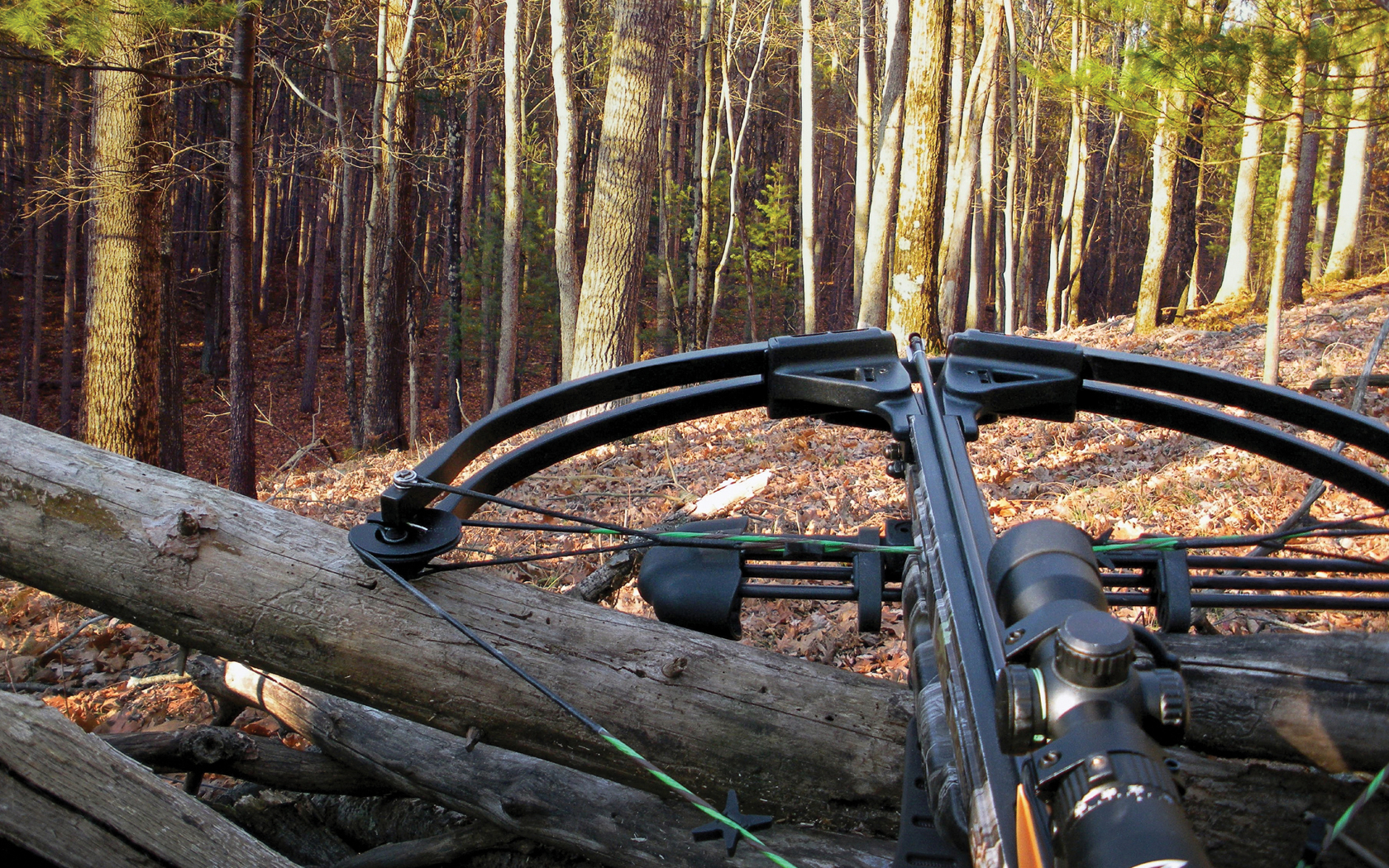
Hunting crossbow

Big game hunting requires a draw weight of more than 35 pounds-force (16 kilograms-force). For larger game such as elk or moose, more than 50 lbf (23 kgf) is suggested. Most male American archers can draw a bow rated at 50–60 lbf (23–27 kgf), most women 30–40 lbf (14–18 kgf).

Lighter arrows, all else equal, will give a higher speed and a flatter trajectory. Arrows with greater mass carry more momentum, and penetrate better in large animals; a minimum mass of 650 grains (40 grams) is recommended for animals such as deer, pigs, etc. and 900 gr (60 g) for the largest game.

== Methods of hunting ==
In contrast to a rifle hunter, who may shoot effectively from ranges in excess of 200 yards (180 m); archers usually restrict shots to 2.3 to 42 yards (2 to 38 m). The distance depends upon individual ability, the target animal, the bow strength, terrain, arrow and weather. The bow hunter may walk along the ground slowly, looking for game and stalking it carefully in the final approach. This type of slow, methodical stalking, is called "spot and stalk." Hunters often wear camouflage clothing and walk upwind (with the wind in their face) so that game ahead of them cannot smell them.

In "stand hunting," the hunter waits for game to come to them, usually near food, water, or known trails. Brush and other natural materials may be placed for cover, or a "ground blind" that looks like a camouflage tent may be used. They usually "pop" up and can be set up from folded in a few minutes. The hunter may wait on a wooden or metal stand elevated in a tree, from three to six meters (3.5 to 6.5 yd).

Bowhunting for fish is called bowfishing. Bowfishing equipment usually adds a line attached to a spool or a reel as well as a specially designed, heavier, barbed arrow. Most bow-fishers do not use sights, but if they do have sights they are different from standard ones to allow for refraction.

== Legal and cultural considerations ==
Bowhunting often has different seasons and restrictions from firearm hunting, and they differ significantly between areas. Legal and cultural approaches specific to the area must be taken into consideration by the hunter.

=== Europe ===
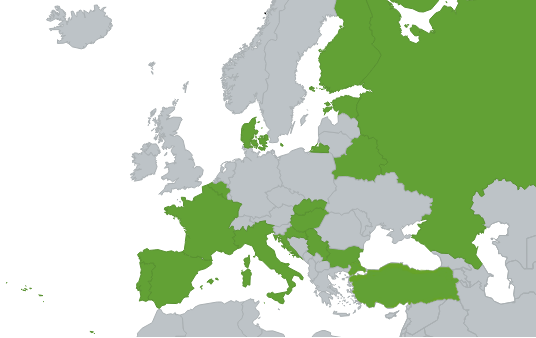
Legal status of bowhunting in Europe with countries allowing bowhunting in green

Nations including Denmark, France, Spain, Portugal, Italy, Hungary, Finland and Bulgaria use bow and arrow hunting as a hunting tool in modern game management. Some European countries, including the United Kingdom, prohibit bowhunting. Bowhunting, like target archery, was revived in the UK during the Victorian era, but has been banned since 1965. Recently a law was passed in Estonia that would allow bowhunting of small game.

=== United States and Canada ===
In the United States and Canada, as with other styles of hunting, bowhunting is regulated by individual provinces and states. Regulations often address issues such as which area to hunt in, what time of year (season), and which sex and species of game may be taken. In many cases, a special archery season is set aside, to minimize interference from rifle hunters. While bowhunting can run into rifle hunting seasons, hunter orange is typically required to be worn during the cross over seasons. In addition, in an effort to maximize game recovery and shot lethality, there are often technical regulations, such as a minimum draw weight, minimum width of head, and lack of barbs.

In general most bow hunting for big game begins in late August or early September in northern states and Canadian provinces, and slightly later in southern states.

=== New Zealand ===
Organized bow hunting began in New Zealand in 1945. The New Zealand government regulates bowhunting. An annual 3 day field shoot tournament is held every king's birthday weekend at various locations throughout New Zealand. Bowhunters must have permission to hunt on private land, and they cannot hunt in DOC lands, national parks, or any other reserves without a permit. All native species are protected; only introduced species are legal quarry.

There are no special seasons for bowhunters or for hunting with a firearm. There is an active bow hunters' society.

=== Australia ===
Bowhunting is practiced in Australia and is not specifically subject to regulation by law. Only non-native species are recognized as game by the Australian Bowhunters Association. However, native species may be killed during government-authorized culls.

The states of Victoria and New South Wales both regulate bowhunting. In Victoria hunting is regulated through the Department of Sustainability and Environment (DSE). In New South Wales this is done through the Department of Primary Industry. At the current time there are no specific hunting regulations in other states and territories.

In July 2013 the New South Wales Government disbanded the Game Council, and temporarily suspended licensed hunting in NSW State forests.

While both Victoria and New South Wales place licensing requirements on would-be bowhunters, the sport is self-regulated. The Australian Bowhunters Association and local clubs assess hunters through the Bowhunter Proficiency Certificate (BPC) which is designed to ensure that animals are killed according to humane principles.

=== Zimbabwe ===
Zimbabwe has legally permitted hunting with compound bows since 1989 as an exception, and since 1999 under formal legislation. Minimum arrow weights and bow draws are mandated. Bowhunting is only allowed on private or tribal lands, but not in national parks. Bowhunters must be accompanied by licensed guides or professional hunters. Bowhunting of elephants is mostly conducted in Zimbabwe. Following international outrage over the killing of Cecil the lion in 2015, the Parks and Wildlife Management Authority banned all bowhunting unless specifically authorized as well as other hunting restrictions.

== Opposition ==
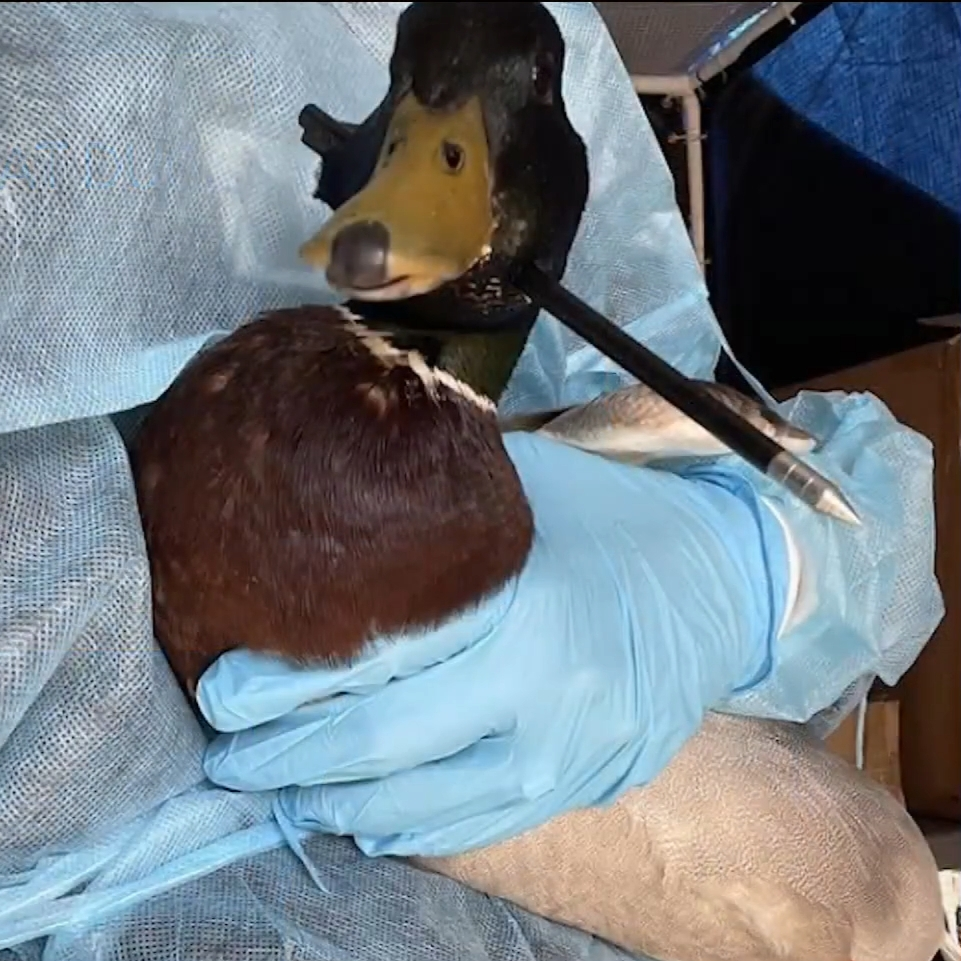
Duck in Newport Beach, California injured by arrow

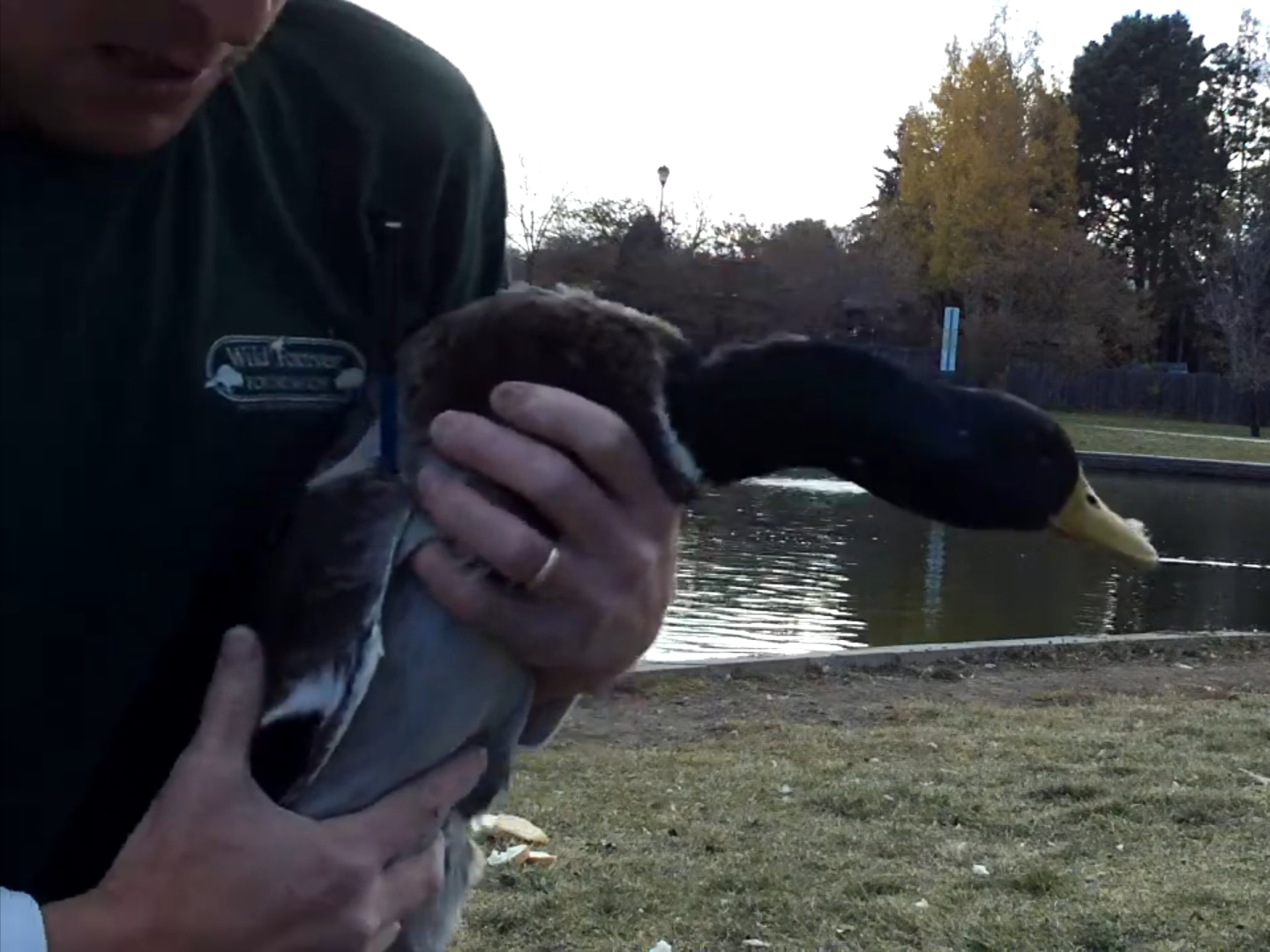
Duck injured by crossbow arrows in Colorado Springs

Some are deeply opposed to bow hunting in particular, on the grounds of cruelty. The organization People for the Ethical Treatment of Animals states that "quick kills are rare, and many animals suffer prolonged, painful deaths when hunters severely injure but fail to kill them."

=== Wounding rates ===
A study conducted by the Oklahoma Fish and Wildlife Agencies found that approximately 50% of deer that were shot were never recovered, noting that this rate was similar to data from other studies. Some deer survived for up to 5–7 days before succumbing to their wounds. "71% to 82% of all shots taken" miss the target and "shot placement is, for all practical purposes, random".

In another study from Maryland, archers who had passed a pre-season accuracy test claimed that 82% of deer hit were recovered within 24 hours.

Danish licensed bowhunters are required to complete a report every time that they kill a roe deer. (To become a licensed bowhunter in Denmark it is necessary to pass a very demanding proficiency test, including a test of accuracy in which five of six arrows must hit within the vital area of game targets ranging from roe deer to pheasant in size at unknown distances up to 25 meters (27 yd). Only 2% of Danish bowhunters use traditional equipment.) For 1999–2004, these reports showed that 576 arrows were released at roe deer. 92.5% of these shots resulted in a dead roe deer being collected by the hunter, and 2.6% are documented as misses. In 5% of reports the deer was hit and wounded (as indicated by bodily fluids on the ground or on the arrow), but not recovered by the hunter. The European Bowhunters Association states that "this percentage compares favorably with other means of harvesting roe deer in Europe."

== See also ==
- Bowfishing
- Broadhead
