= Deb Vanasse =

American writer

- Born: Debra Lynn Lehmann; September 12, 1957 (age 68); St. Paul, Minnesota
- Citizenship: American
- Education: Bemidji State University (BS); California State University Dominguez Hills (MH)
- Occupation: Writer

Deb Vanasse (born September 12, 1957) is an American writer of more than a dozen books, many of which are set in Alaska. Her children's books include six picture books and two young adult novels. She and young-adult novelist Gail Giles are the co-authors of No Returns, Book One in a planned series, the Battleband Saga. Her books for adults include Cold Spell and a forthcoming biography of the Klondike gold rush figure Kate Carmack. She has also authored three travel guides on Alaska, one under a pseudonym, and she has edited a collection of historic photographs.

== Life and career ==
Vanasse was born in St. Paul, Minnesota. Her maiden name is Debra Lynn Lehmann; her brother is the writer Chris Lehmann. She lived in Ann Arbor, Michigan; Galesburg, Illinois; and Madison, Wisconsin before moving to Iowa, where she graduated from Davenport West High School. She attended Washington University in St. Louis and graduated with a Bachelor in Science from Bemidji State University in Minnesota and a Masters in the Humanities from California State University Dominguez Hills.

Vanasse's debut novel for young adults, A Distant Enemy, was a Junior Literary Guild selection and is featured in Best Books for Young Teen Readers, Grades 7 to 10, as was her second novel Out of the Wilderness. Her picture book titles include Under Alaska's Midnight Sun (illustrated by Jeremiah Tramell); Alaska Animal Babies (photographs by Gavriel Jecan); Totem Tale (illustrated by Erik Brooks); and Amazing Alaska (illustrated by Karen E. Lewis). Set in a Yup'ik village, there is also a Yup'ik language edition of Lucy's Dance, illustrated by Nancy Slagle.

Black Wolf of the Glacier, also illustrated by Nancy Slagle, is based on the true story of Romeo, a well-known wolf that lived near Mendenhall Glacier in Juneau, Alaska. No Returns, Book One of the Battleband Saga, is Vanasse’s first co-authored novel with Gail Giles. Cold Spell, her first work of literary fiction for adults, is part of the University of Alaska Press Alaska Literary Series. Vanasse and another writer, Andromeda Romano-Lax, founded the 49 Alaska Writing Center.

She lives in Oregon, with her husband and dog.

== Bibliography ==
Picture Books
1. Under Alaska’s Midnight Sun (March 1, 2005)
2. Alaska Animal Babies (March 1, 2005)
3. Totem Tale (Feb. 7, 2006)
4. Amazing Alaska (March 2, 2010)
5. Lucy’s Dance (June 15, 2011)
6. Black Wolf of the Glacier (March 15, 2013)

Novels
1. A Distant Enemy (Jan. 10, 2014)
2. Out of the Wilderness (June 13, 2013)
3. No Returns (Feb. 12, 2014)
4. Cold Spell (2014)

Nonfiction
1. Picture This, Alaska (Jan. 27, 2009)
2. Wealth Woman: Kate Carmack and the Last Great Race for Gold (2014)
