= Thoiry, Yvelines =

Thoiry
- Commune
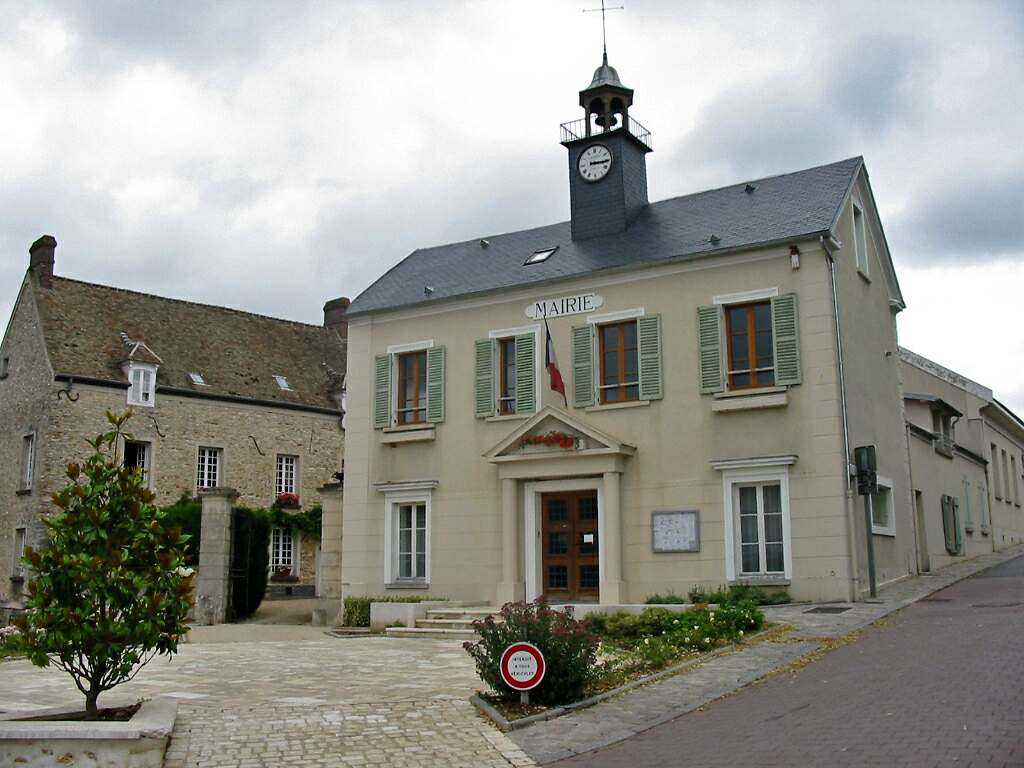
- Town hall

- Coat of arms
- Location of Thoiry
- Location within France Location within Île-de-France (region)
- Coordinates: 48°51′59″N 1°47′41″E
- Country: France
- Region: Île-de-France
- Department: Yvelines
- Arrondissement: Rambouillet
- Canton: Aubergenville

Government
  - Mayor (2020–2026): Benjamin Bayliss
- Area^{1}: 7.09 km^{2} (2.74 sq mi)
- Elevation: 151 m (495 ft)
- Highest elevation: 171 m (561 ft)
- Lowest elevation: 113 m (371 ft)
- Population (2023): 1,434
  - Density: 202/km^{2} (524/sq mi)
- Time zone: UTC+01:00 (CET)
  - Summer (DST): UTC+02:00 (CEST)
- INSEE/Postal code: 78616 /78770
- ^{1} French Land Register data, which excludes lakes, ponds, glaciers > 1 km^{2} (0.386 sq mi or 247 acres) and river estuaries.

Thoiry (French pronunciation: [twaʁi]) is a commune in the Yvelines department in the Île-de-France region in north-central France. It is the location of Château de Thoiry.

== Sport ==
Stage 2 of The 2024 Paris–Nice Cycle Race began at Thoiry, March 3, 2024.

== Points of Interest ==
- Château de Thoiry - is a 150-hectare (370-acre) castle, zoo and botanical garden that was opened to the public in 1965.

== See also ==
- Communes of the Yvelines department
