= Orphaned Wildlife Center =

US nonprofit organization

The Orphaned Wildlife Center
- Founded: 2015
- Founder: Jim Kowalczik, Susan Kowalczik, Kerry Clair
- Purpose: Animal welfare, animal rights
- Location: Otisville, New York
- Region served: New York
- Key people: Kerry Clair
- Employees: 0
- Volunteers: 3
- Website: orphanedwildlife.org

The Orphaned Wildlife Center is an American nonprofit 501(c)(3) animal welfare organization located in Otisville, New York. Founded by Jim Kowalczik, Susan Kowalczik, and Kerry Clair in 2015, the mission is to save orphaned wildlife, rehabilitate and release them back into the wild. Animals that cannot be released back into the wild are offered sanctuary at their Otisville facility. They also have accepted animals from other facilities when those animals could not be released. Currently, there are 8 bears of varying species living at the sanctuary. They are part of an Educational Program. The Kowalczik's have unique relationships with the bears based on endless trust and caring. None of the bears are trained or made to "do" anything and live in large outdoor enclosures with a wooded environment complete with ponds and trees. They also have an inside den area that they can access. The sanctuary is not open to the public and limited tours are available through scheduling such from their website.

One of the largest kodiak bears on record, Jimbo, lived at the Orphaned Wildlife Center. Jimbo stood at nine and a half feet tall, and weighed in at almost 1500 pounds. He died in 2018 of liver cancer at the age of 24.
