= René Vanasse =

Canadian businessman (1921–1996)

René Vanasse (July 27, 1921 – May 8, 1996) was a businessman and pioneer in Rouyn-Noranda, Québec, Canada. He ran for Mayor of Rouyn in 1961.

== Background ==
Vanasse was born in Saint-Germain de Grantham , near Drummondville (Québec). After four years of service in the Canadian Army, Vanasse moved to Rouyn in 1946. He was among the early pioneers to settle in this secluded boomtown in the resource-rich Abitibi region. He founded Vanasse Tire Ltd, an auto repair shop which sold tires and cars. Vanasse married Oliviette Rouleau in 1949, and had four children: Marc, Renée-Marie, Louise and François (adopted). Vanasse was an active member of the Rouyn Chamber of Commerce. He also volunteered with the Kiwanis club and served on the Board of the local Red Cross organization.

== Mayoral campaign ==
In 1961, Vanasse ran for Mayor of Rouyn. He told a local paper:

"In the last few months, some have expressed a desire to see me run for Mayor of Rouyn, without, however, persuading me. But the idea stuck, and with imminent elections, I feel I'm doing my duty by putting my 15 years of business experience to the town's disposal."

"I don't have a magic solution to the financial problems that plague the city. But I'll do everything in my power, with the help of the councilors and city staff, to govern soundly and give people the services we expect from a progressive and modern town—all the while making ends meet."

The full-page ads he ran in the paper laid-out his campaign platform, which included "Paving our streets and sidewalks over a period of three years," "Organized recreational activities for children and adults," and "...a solution to the water problem."

At a speech he made before a group of business owners, he joked that—being 6 foot 5 inches—they would vote for "the tallest mayor in the Province of Québec." On election day, Vanasse came in third with 23% of the vote, behind dentist Rodrigue Houle (33%) and the victor, accountant Alex Leclerc (44%).
