= Bear hunting =

Practices in Europe and North America

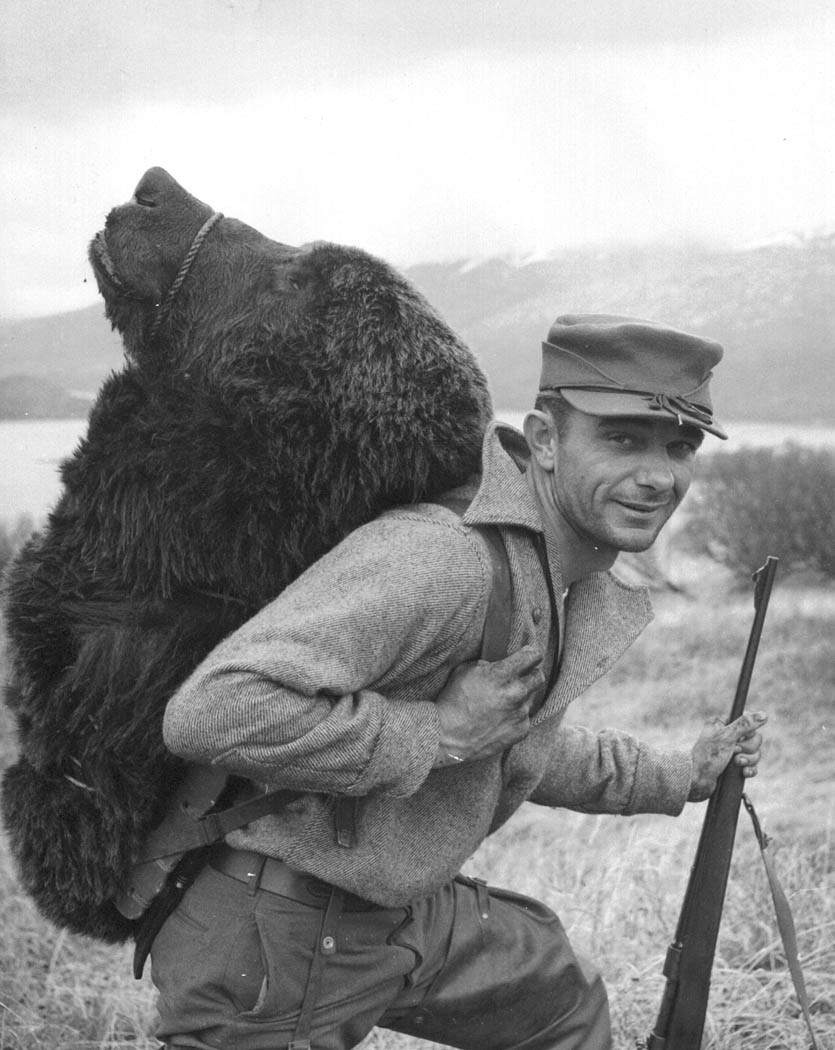
Hunter with a bear's head strapped to his back on the Kodiak Archipelago, 1957

Bear hunting is a practice that has been historically present in every culture in contact with the animal. Bears have been hunted since prehistoric times for their meat and fur. In addition to being a source of food, in modern times they have been favored by big game hunters due to their size and ferocity. Bear hunting has a vast history throughout Europe and North America, and hunting practices have varied based on location and type of bear.

Bear are large mammals in the order Carnivora. Although there are only eight living species of bear, they are widespread, appearing in a wide variety of habitats throughout the Northern Hemisphere and partially in the Southern Hemisphere. The IUCN lists six bear species as vulnerable or endangered, and even "least concern" species such as the brown bear are at risk of extirpation in certain countries. Poaching and illegal international trade of threatened populations continues.

In the case of the American black bear, hunting is encouraged by some authorities to ameliorate past management issues. Historically protected, by 2016 and 2023, higher-than-projected reproduction rates have resulted in over-population and public safety concerns in some areas. Certain populations of black bear remain at risk of extirpation.

== Brown bear ==
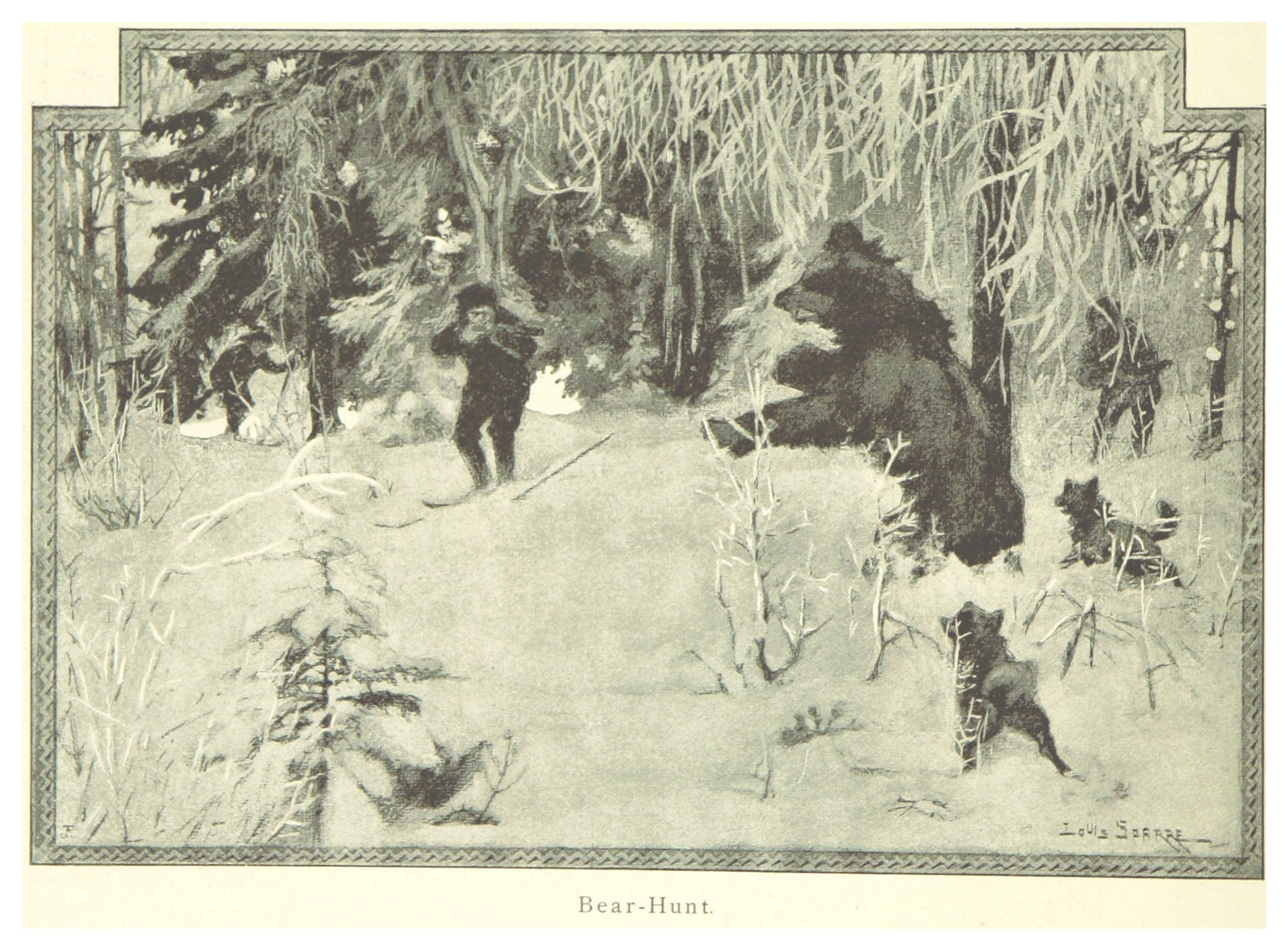
The Bear Hunt by Louis Sparre (1894)

The brown bear (Ursus arctos) is a large species of bear distributed throughout the Northern Hemisphere.

Brown bear tracks have much deeper claw indentations than those made by black bear.

=== Regional variations ===
The grizzly bear (Ursus arctos horribilis) is a North American subspecies. Grizzly bear are brown in color although not all brown bear inhabiting the interior of Alaska, British Columbia, Alberta, the Yukon, and Northwest Territories are grizzlies. Inland grizzlies tend to be much smaller than their coastal relatives. Grizzly bear seasons open in the spring or autumn depending on local regulations and jurisdictions. In most of the lower 48 US states, grizzlies are considered a threatened species under the Endangered Species Act. Grizzly bear are legally hunted in the Northwest Territories, Yukon, and Alaska. The government of British Columbia banned the hunting of Grizzly Bears in 2017, as it did not align with their values.

The Syrian brown bear (Ursus arctos syriacus) is a small and pale-furred bear subspecies found in Turkey, Syria, Iran, and the Caucasus mountains of Russia, Georgia and Azerbaijan. These bear are hunted mostly in the Caucasus, by stalking, where the harsh terrain offers a greater challenge to the hunter.

The Eurasian brown bear (Ursus arctos arctos) is most widespread subspecies of brown bear in the Old World. It is mainly found today in Russia, Romania, Turkey and the former Yugoslavia, with smaller numbers being found in Norway, Sweden, Finland, the Czech Republic, Slovakia, Poland, Hungary, Albania, Bulgaria and Greece, and remnant populations are found in Spain, France and Italy. The non-endangered European population of Eurasian bear is hunted mostly in the north-western part of Russia, while the Asian population is hunted in the Ural Mountains and in eastern Siberia. Eurasian browns are usually hunted by baiting during the spring or autumn or by chance encounter while hunting other species.

The Amur brown bear (Ursus arctos lasiotus) is smaller and darker than the Kamchatka brown bear, with a differently shaped skull and much larger teeth. Its range encompasses far eastern Russia, Northeastern Heilongjiang and Hokkaidō. It is usually hunted in the Khabarovsk and Primorsk regions by stalking.

The Kamchatka brown bear (Ursus arctos beringianus) is a large subspecies found in far eastern Siberia. It is similar to the Kodiak bear, though darker in colour. These bear are usually hunted in the Shantar Islands (Okhotsk) and Magadan. In the spring, bear are hunted in coastal areas where they gather for food. During the autumn, bear are hunted while feeding on salmon or wild berries in the surrounding tundra. The average size of the bear taken is around 7.5–8.0 ft (2.3–2.4 m) in Magadan and Okhotsk and 8.0–8.5 ft (2.4–2.6 m) in Kamchatka.

The Siberian brown bear (Ursus arctos collaris) is larger than the Eurasian brown bear, with denser bones and a slightly larger and heavier skull. Its fur is considered to be among the most luxuriant. It is smaller than the Kamchatka brown bear, though it is also said to be equal in aggression to an American grizzly. It lives east of the Yenisey River in most of Siberia (though absent in the habitats of the Kamchatka and Amur brown bear.) It is also found in northern Mongolia, far northern Xinjiang, and extreme eastern Kazakhstan. They are usually hunted in the Krasnoyarsk Region, Irkutsk Region and Yakutia in late August and early June. These hunts usually take place in rugged and heavily forested terrain, in the foothills of the mountains, or along the shorelines, where the forest is less dense.

The American black bear (Ursus americanus) is the most common bear species native to North America. The largest black bear are usually taken beginning in late May and continuing on through most of June during the breeding season. Springtime is the preferred choice of black bear hunters, when their coats are at their thickest. Heavily timbered forests near agricultural lands often sustain large densities of black bear. They can also be found in proximity to cereal crops such as oats.

== Uses ==
=== Pelts ===
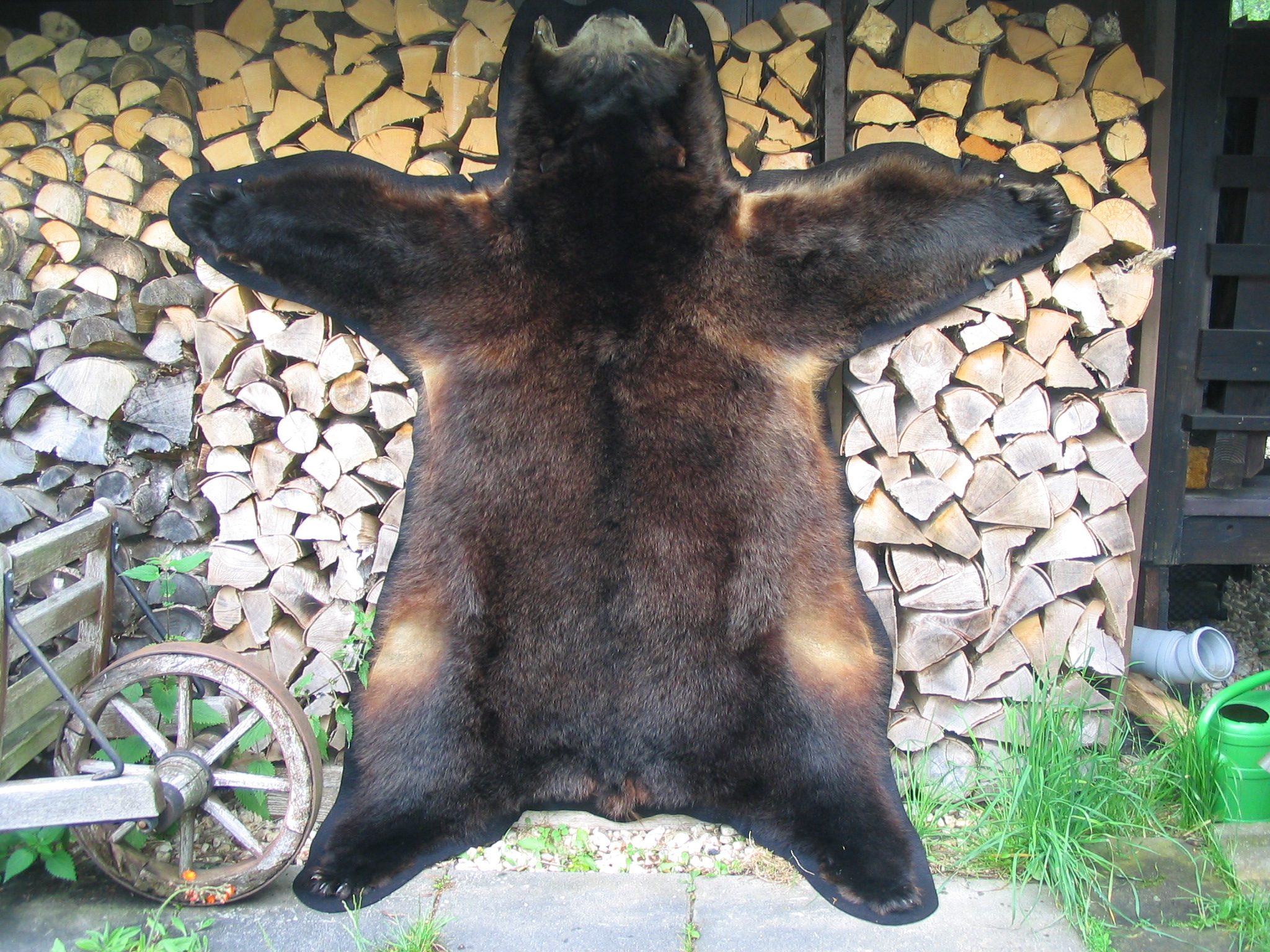
American black bear skin, Alaska, 2012

A bear's fur consists of two types of hair: the underfur and the outer guard hairs. The underfur, which is soft and dense, serves primarily as an insulator. The outer guard hairs are much thicker, longer and coarser, and while they also insulate, they primarily serve to protect the body from dirt, debris and insects, as well as to repel water.

Black bear fur was considered more valuable in the American West than that of grizzly. Bear furs are used to fabricate bearskins, which are tall fur caps worn as part of the full dress uniform for several military units. The Inuit of Greenland use polar bear fur for clothing in areas where reindeer (caribou) and seals are scarce. Polar bear hide is wiry and bulky, making it difficult to turn into comfortable winter garments.

=== Meat ===
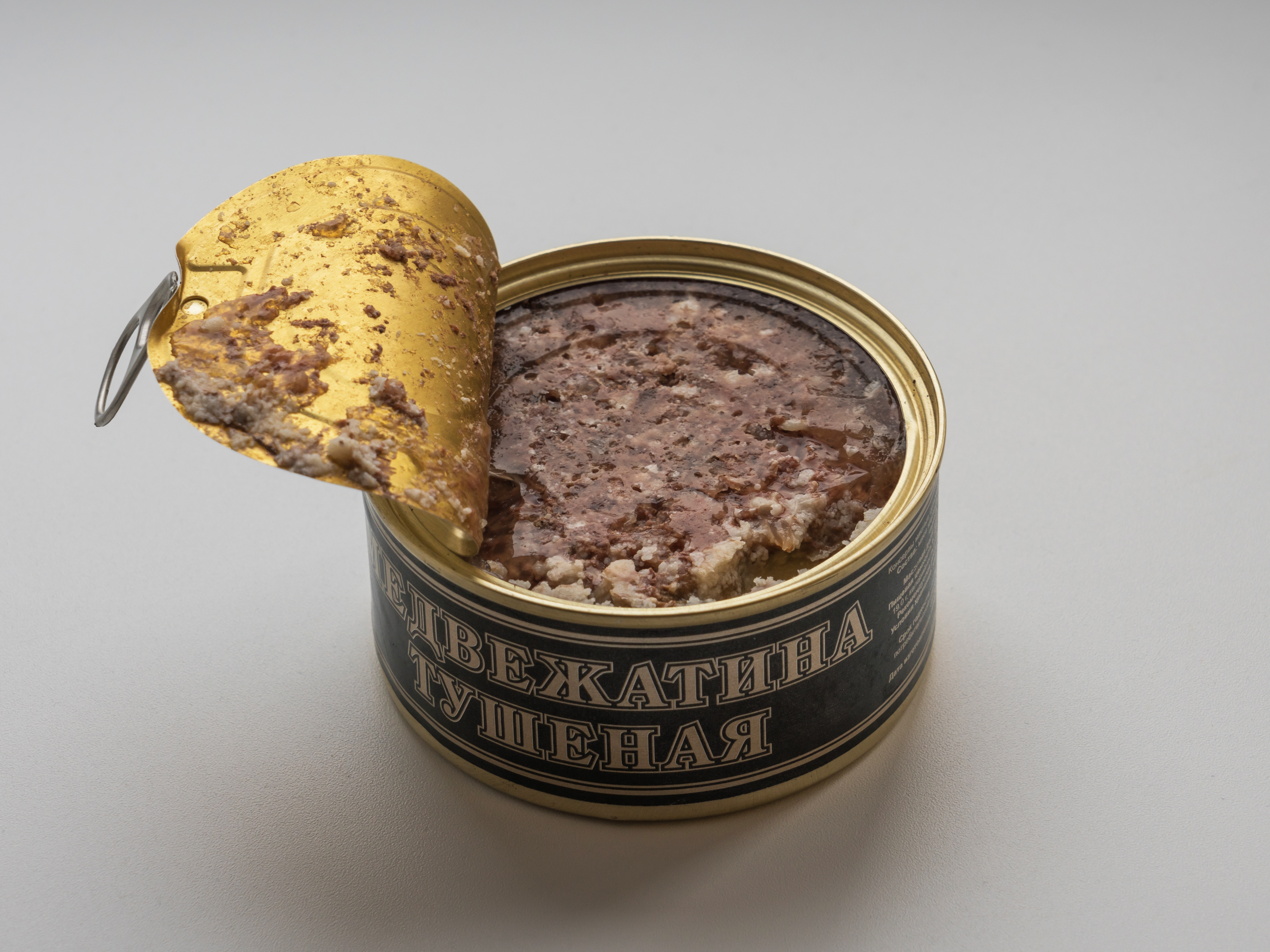
Canned bear meat from Russia

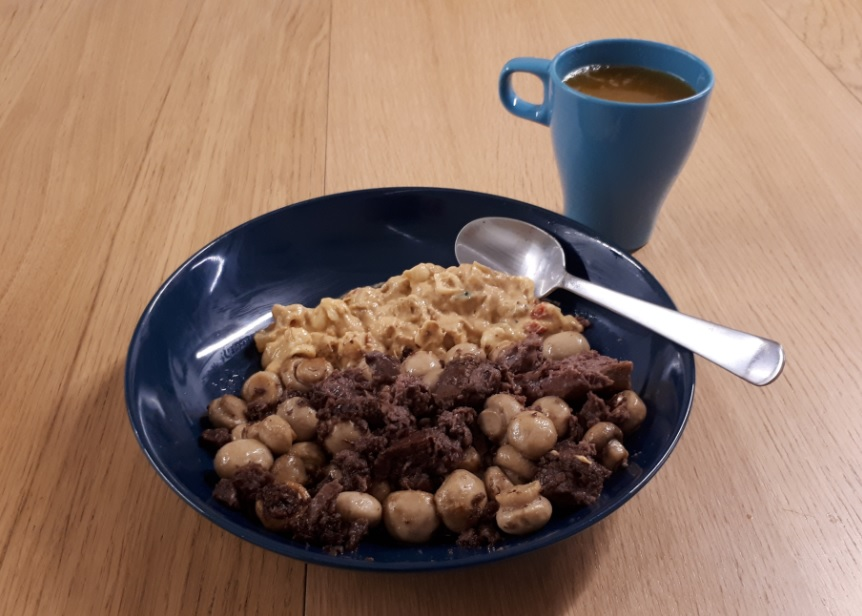
Canned bear meat from Finland

In Medieval Europe, the eating of bear meat was considered more a symbolic than culinary act. The paws and thigh of the bear were considered the best parts. It was consumed in traditional Russian, Native Siberian, and Ainu cultures. Polar bear are a primary source of food for Inuit. Polar bear meat is usually baked or boiled in a soup or stew. It is never eaten raw. Polar bear liver is inedible, as it contains large amounts of vitamin A and is highly toxic. Bear meat should be thoroughly cooked as it can carry a parasitic infection known as Trichinella and is potentially lethal to humans. It is the single biggest vector of trichinosis in North America.

The taste of bear is extremely variable and dependent on the age and diet of the animal. Bears fed on fish will have the most disagreeable, rancid flavor, which has led to a poor reputation of the meat as a whole, however more omnivorous or plant-based diets introduce a highly desirable, venison-like sweetness and depth to the meat. The best meat apparently comes from two-year-old bear which eat more berries than fish. Bear features notably in Indigenous North American cuisine. Cree writer Joshua Whitehead wrote of the spiritual dimensions of eating bear meat in an autobiographical essay.

=== Fat ===
Bear fat has been used historically in Europe to treat baldness, being mentioned in the writings of numerous physicians such as Nicholas Culpepper. The logo of perfume brand Atkinsons of London is a bear, in reference to their popular 'bears grease' product.

It has historically been used as cooking oil and medicine by both American settlers and Native Americans. Bear fat can also be used as lamp fuel, with 40–50 grams being sufficient to last up to an hour.

=== Traditional Chinese medicine ===
Traditional Chinese medicine makes use of bear bile and bear paws. Many bear are hunted or poached just to harvest their paws and gall bladders.

== History ==
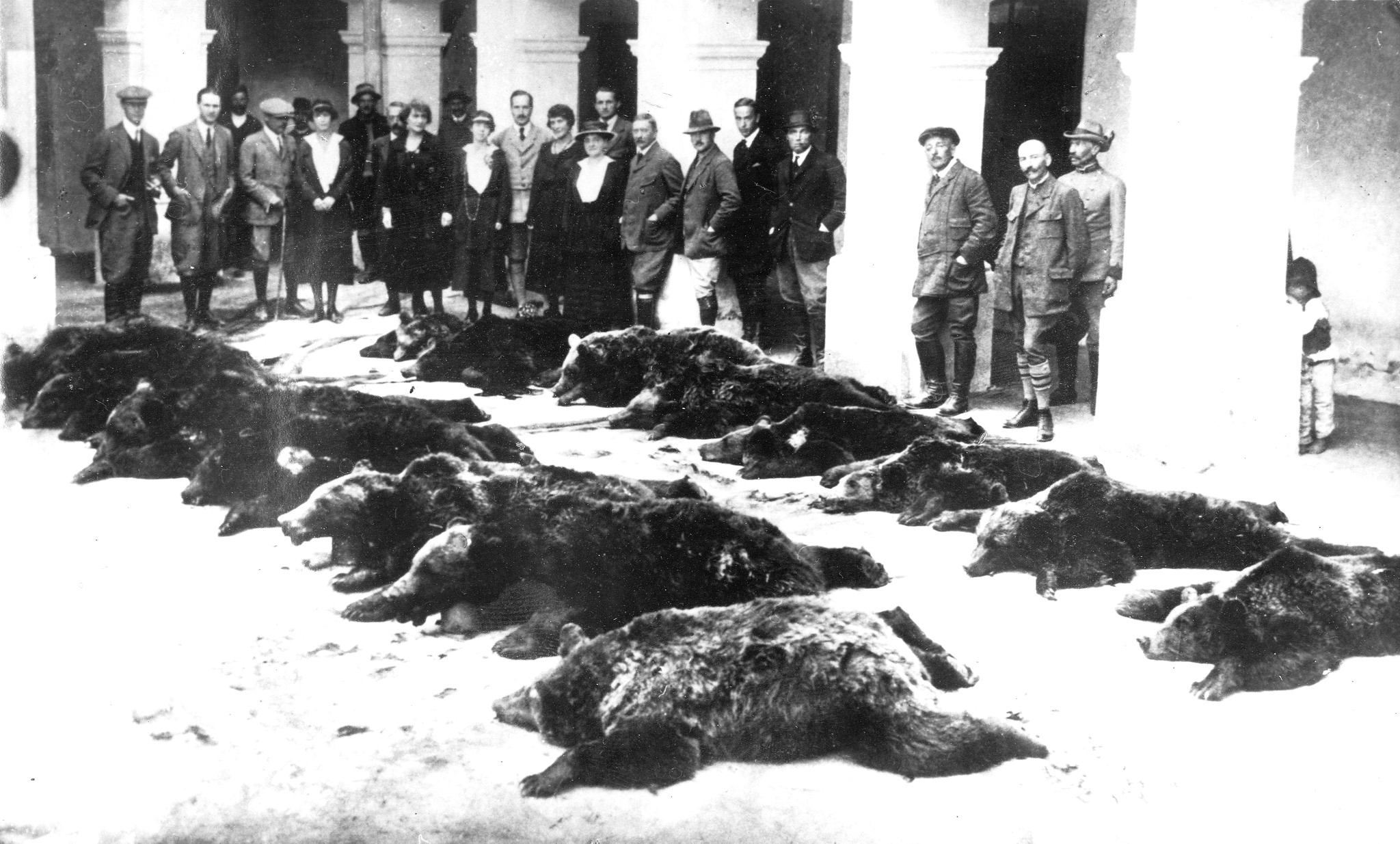
Bear hunt by the foot of Magura

In Europe of the late Middle Ages, the eating of bear meat was an aristocratic activity. In Tyrol and Piedmont, the village communities had to hand in a set number of bear paws to the local lord every year.

In the 1890s, nobles from Germany and Partitioned Poland could import and hunt bears from the Russian Empire for 100-150 rubles per bear.

=== North America ===
Traditionally, Kodiak Natives (Alutiiqs) hunted bear for food, clothing and tools. Arrows and spears were required hunting implements. Bear heads were usually left in the field as a sign of respect to the spirit of the bear. Kodiak bear were commercially hunted throughout the 1800s with the price paid for a bear hide being comparable to that paid for a beaver or river otter pelt (about US$10).

In 1702, bear pelts were considered equal in worth to those of American beavers. 16,512 furs were sent to the French port of Rochelle in 1743, while 8,340 were exported from the east coast of the United States in 1763. In the 19th century, as the settlers began increasingly moving west in pursuit of more land for ranching, bear were becoming increasingly more hunted as threats to livestock. In 1818, a “War of Extermination” against wolves and bear was declared in Ohio. Bear pelts were usually sold for 2–20 dollars in the 1860s.

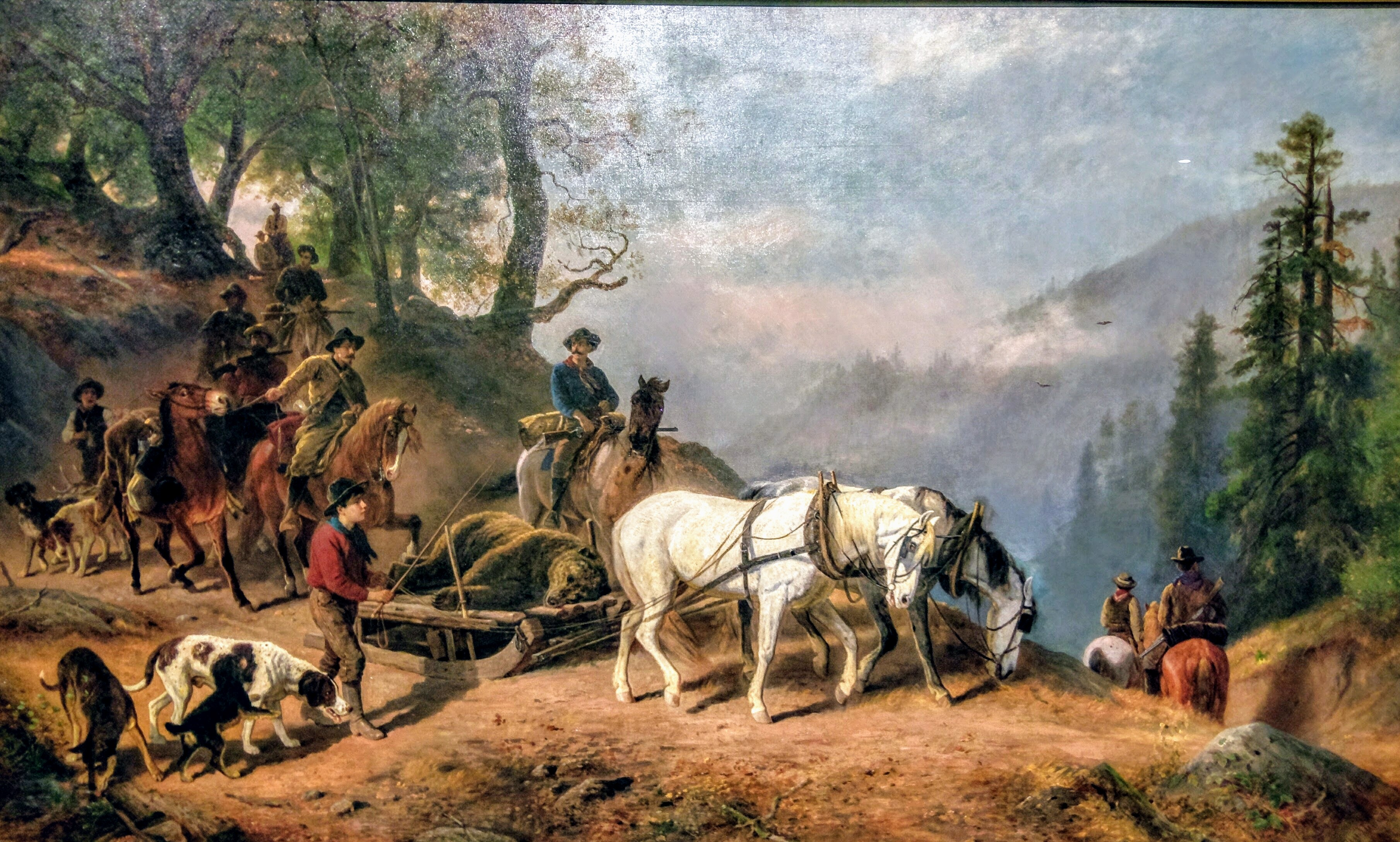
Grizzly bear hunting in Northern California in 1882

Between 1850 and 1920 grizzly bear were eliminated from 95% of their original range, with extirpation occurring earliest on the Great Plains and later in remote mountainous areas. Unregulated killing of bear continued in most places through the 1950s and resulted in a further 52% decline in their range between 1920 and 1970. Grizzly bear managed to survive this last period of hunting only in remote wilderness areas larger than 26,000 km^{2} (10,000 mi^{2}). Overall, grizzly bear were eliminated from 98% of their original range in the contiguous United States during a 100-year period.

Prior to Anglo-American colonization in 1820, black bear were widely distributed throughout all major eco-regions in Texas. The supply of both meat and fat lasted about a century after the first Anglo-American settlers arrived. However, after their value for grease and food had decreased, black bear continued to be pursued and killed for their trophy value. Black bear in East Texas were seriously reduced to scattered remnant populations or eliminated altogether in many areas largely as a result of indiscriminate and unregulated hunting by the time the first organized survey of mammals took place from 1890 to 1904. The last native East Texas black bear is believed to have been killed in the 1950s.

== Methods ==
Bears are hard to hunt, as they generally live in dense forests or thick brush. They are, however, easy to trap. Where they are hunted frequently, bears become purely nocturnal.

Once a general area is identified, a bear hunt usually begins by looking for claw marks on trees. Scores in bear hunts are based on the width and length of the skull.

=== Firearms ===
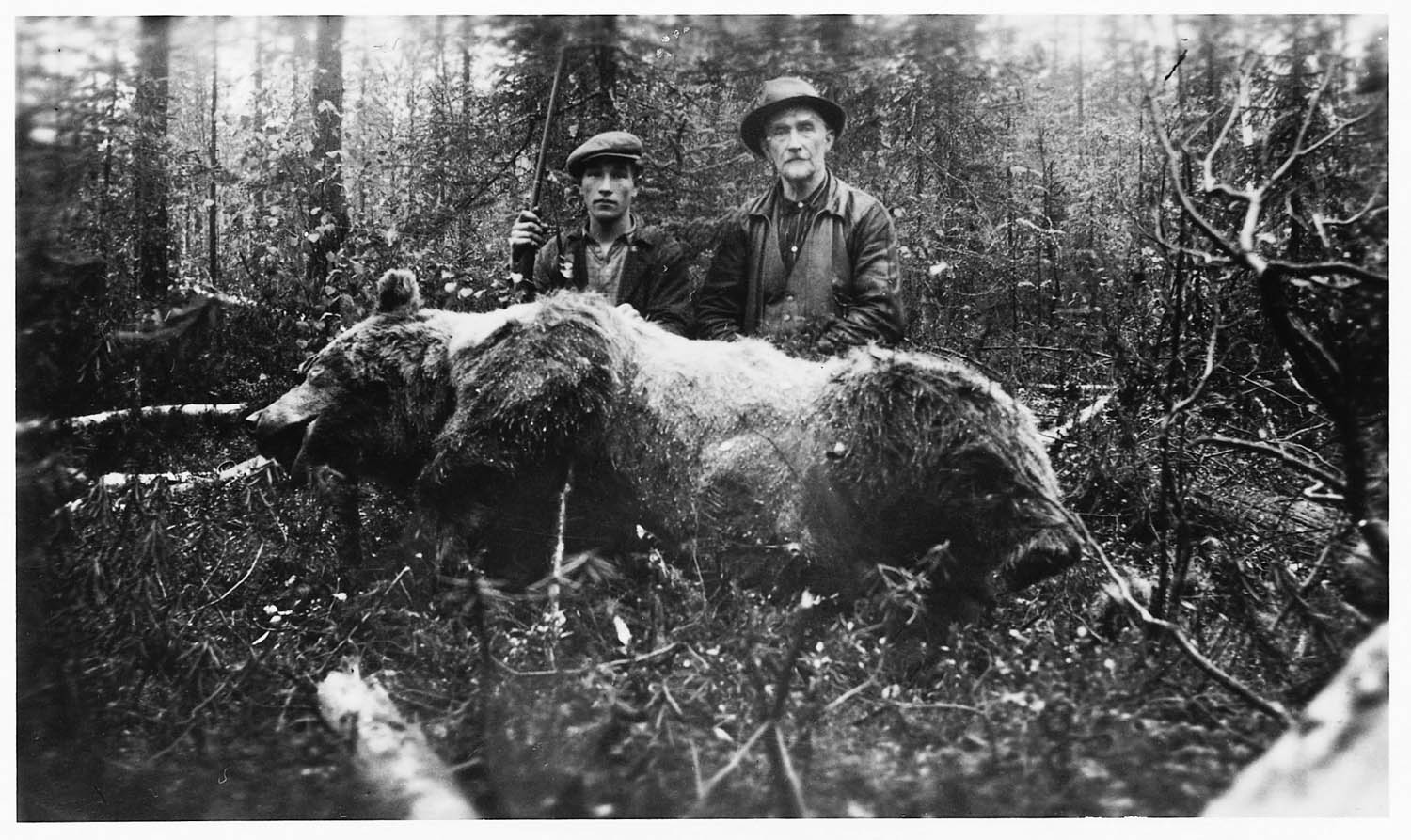
Bear hunt in Dalarna, Sweden, early 20th century

Hunters carrying firearms tend to favour calibres large enough to inflict as much tissue and bone damage as possible, as grizzly and brown bear can generally withstand a number of direct shots to the limbs or torso without ceasing their attack. Bears have the ability to dramatically lower their heart rate when hibernating and will readily do so if injured, as a defense mechanism against blood loss. Hunters pursuing the animal deliberately might use a caliber larger than they would for the deer, elk and caribou that commonly co-inhabit the same area. If they intend to keep the hide, and to ensure a quick and humane kill, they may prefer to use a large bullet that will break the bear's shoulder and continue through the vital organs, ideally leaving an exit wound large enough to leave a blood trail to assist locating the downed animal. It isn’t uncommon to see bear being hunted from helicopters or in the air.

=== Bear spear ===
The bear spear was a medieval type of spear used in hunting for bear and other large animals. The sharpened head of a bear spear was enlarged and usually had a form of a bay leaf. Right under the head there was a short crosspiece that helped fixing the spear in the body of an animal. Often it was placed against the ground on its rear point, which made it easier to hold the weight of an attacking beast.

=== Baiting ===
Often, bear will be attracted through the use of bait, such as a rotting carcass, bakery by-products, sweets, or even jellies. A hunter will then watch one or more baits from a stand, armed with a rifle, bow, or shotgun. Many states within the US have changed their hunting regulations and banned baiting as a form of bear hunting.

=== Snaring ===
In the Russian Far East, a lasso-like rope loop is hung across a path which bear are known to frequent; its end is tied to a tree. The bear passes through the rope as it walks by and the lasso tightens around its body as it continues to move. Eventually the bear becomes so entangled within the rope that it can no longer move. After a few days, the hunter arrives to finish off the immobilised animal.

=== Calling ===
It is possible to attract bears by calling, imitating the sound of injured prey. Bears seem to have very short attention spans and if they are responding to a call and the sound stops, generally the bear will cease following the sound. Two callers are often better than one when calling bear as they can keep up continuous calling for longer periods of time. Bears can hear a call for distances up to a mile and often will take their time in responding.

=== Hunting dogs ===
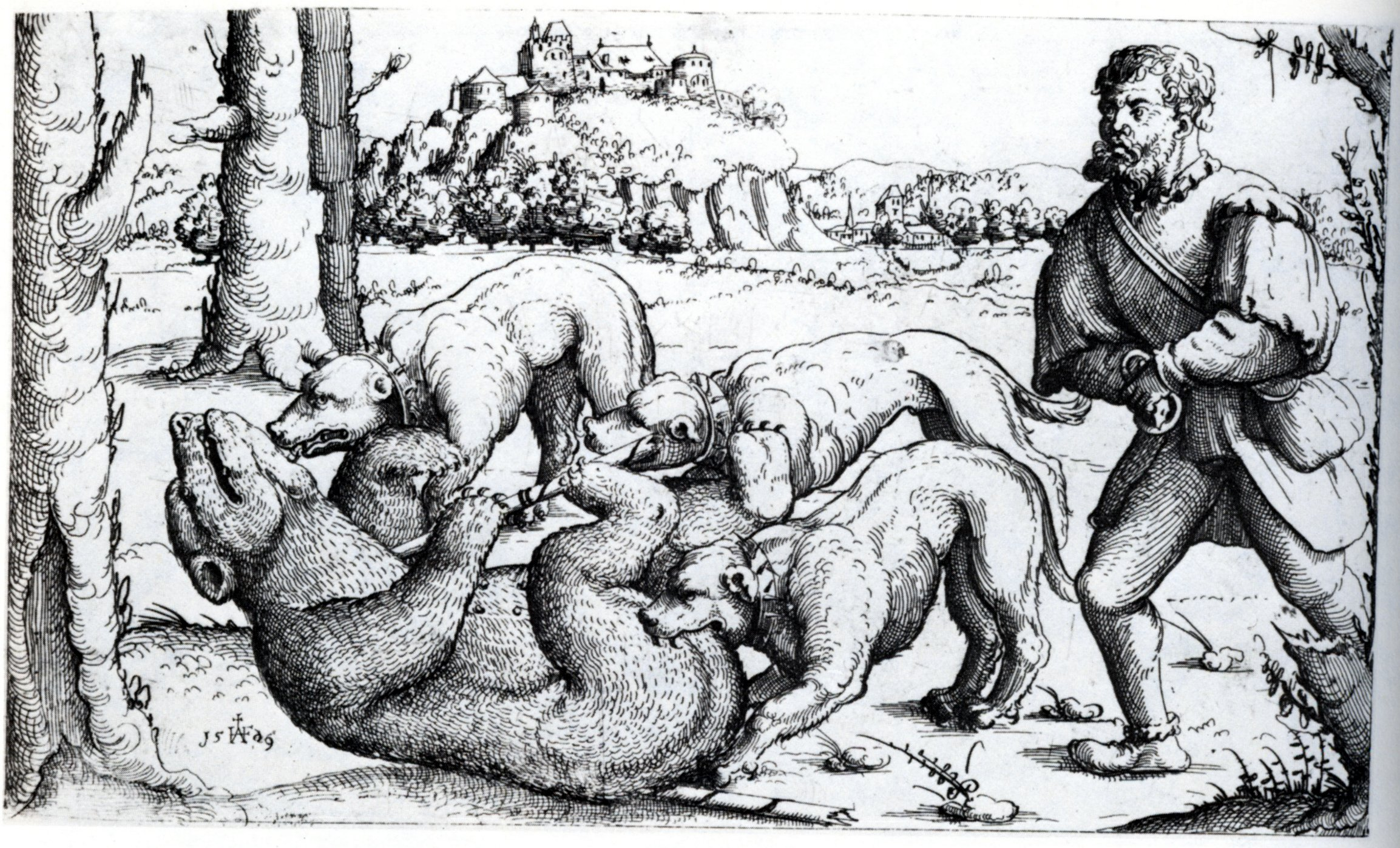
A medieval bear hunt with dogs

In his book Hunting the Grisly and Other Sketches, Theodore Roosevelt wrote that though small terriers could be used against bears, they usually only worked against bears which had never had the experience of being hunted before. The terriers would irritate and distract the bear with their yapping as the hunter crept up unnoticed. However, once the bear would notice the hunter, it would immediately ignore the dogs and retreat.

He did, however, mention big half-breed hounds sometimes used in the Alleghanies of West Virginia, which were trained not merely to nip a bear, but to grip the grizzly by the hock as it ran. A pack of such dogs, trained to dash straight at the head and hold on like a vice, though unable to kill the bear, would hold it in place long enough for the hunter to finish it.

Bears were dangerous quarry for the dogs to tackle, and pack losses were not uncommon. Though a large number of dogs could kill sick or very young bear, they could not do so with healthy adults.

These big dogs can only overcome such foes by rushing in a body and grappling all together; if they hang back, lunging and snapping, a cougar or bear will destroy them one by one. With a quarry so huge and redoubtable as the grisly, no number of dogs, however large and fierce, could overcome him unless they all rushed on him in a mass, the first in the charge seizing by the head or throat. If the dogs hung back, or if there were only a few of them, or if they did not seize around the head, they would be destroyed without an effort. It is murder to slip merely one or two close-quarter dogs at a grisly.

— Hunting the Grisly and Other Sketches, Chapter III: Old Ephraim the Grisly bear

Today, it is more common for hunters to use dogs to track a bear. Often riding in the back of a truck to catch a scent, the dog will start to bark when there is a track. Dogs will then follow the track, showing the way for the hunters. Modern bear hunters use hounds of mixed breeding to tree bear. Bear dogs used to track and tree American black bears in Michigan are typically cross-bred hounds, often with GPS tracking collars on one or more dogs to help locate the pack in the dense forest.

=== Poison ===
In the expansion era of the American west, poison was usually only practiced by the owners of cattle or sheep who had suffered losses from bear, though this was rarely put into practice seeing as bear were harder to poison than most other carnivores such as wolves.

== See also ==
- Bear attack
- Bear danger
- Pedals (bear)
- Polar bear hunting
- We're Going on a Bear Hunt, children's story and game
