= Vince (rhinoceros) =

Southern white rhinoceros killed by poachers

- Species: Southern White Rhinoceros
- Sex: Male
- Born: 22 September 2012; Royal Burgers' Zoo, Arnhem, The Netherlands
- Died: 5 March 2017 (aged 4); Parc Zoologique de Thoiry, Thoiry, Yvelines, France
- Known for: First rhinoceros to be illegally killed inside a zoo in Europe

Vince (22 September 2012 – 5 March 2017) was a Southern white rhinoceros who was killed by poachers inside a zoo in Thoiry near Paris, France.

== Birth and life ==
Vince was born on 22 September 2012 at Royal Burgers' Zoo, Arnhem, Netherlands. He was the second calf produced by 12-year-old Kwanzaa and her 20-year-old mate Gilou. Vince was born six weeks premature. On 6 November 2012 he was introduced to other safari animals at the Zoo.

In March 2015, Vince and another rhinoceros Bruno were transferred to Parc Zoologique de Thoiry in France. He lived in an enclosure with two other rhinoceroses, Bruno and Gracie. The three animals bonded, and Vince and Bruno, who were the same age, often played together.

== Killing ==
On 5 March 2017, Vince was shot three times and killed by a group of poachers who had broken into the rhino enclosure after the zoo had closed. They removed one of Vince's horns using a chainsaw and only managed to partially saw off his second horn before fleeing. Zoo officials and investigators think the attack was carried out to collect the rhino's horns and sell them on the black market. Rhinoceros horns are used in traditional Chinese medicine and Asian cultures, and a single horn can be sold for up to $300,000 on the black market.

On Vince's death, Thierry Duguet, the head of the zoo, said "There has never been a case like this in a zoo in Europe, an assault of such violence, evidently for this stupid trafficking of rhinoceros horns". French Minister Ségolène Royal called the killing a "criminal act".
