= Leon Kachelhoffer =

Motswana trophy hunter

Leon Kachelhoffer is a Motswana trophy hunter who caused an international outcry for killing a circa 45-year-old rare and well-known 'big tusker' elephant in Botswana in 2022 alongside a smaller second elephant.

Kachelhoffer justified his killing by stating that poachers may otherwise have targeted the elephant for its ivory, had he not shot the animal himself.

When asked about the case, Dr. Dilys Roe of the International Union for Conservation of Nature (IUCN) speculated that paid elephant hunting could have a positive impact on wildlife, highlighting that "if nothing can be earned with wildlife, the local population would rather convert the hunting grounds into agricultural land and kill the animals themselves".
