= David Jackson (archer) =

French archer (born 1992)

Personal information
- Born: 15 May 1992 (age 34)

Sport
- Country: France
- Sport: Archery
- Event: Barebow
- Club: French National Team
Medal record
Men's Archery
Representing France
European Indoor Championships
| Silver medal – second place | 2026 Plovdiv | Individual |
| Silver medal – second place | 2026 Plovdiv | Team |
- Updated on 14 January 2026

David Jackson is a French archer born on May 15, 1992. He is notably a two-time world champion in 3D archery in 2019, both individually and as part of a team.

== Biography ==
On November 15, 2019, he was elected archer of the year by the French Archery Federation. He was competing against Sophie Dodemont, Adrien Gontier, Christine Gauthe, and Mélanie Gaubil. He won with 559 votes out of more than 2,000, one vote ahead of Sophie Dodemont. He became a three-time world champion in 2022. He was again elected archer of the year on December 2, 2022, by the French Archery Federation. In February 2025, he won a silver medal in the barebow team event and a bronze medal in the individual barebow event at the European Indoor Championships. At world level he won four gold medals in the 3D specialty and one in the Field.

== Medal table ==
Barebow
World Archery 3D Championships
| Edition | Place | Medal | Event |
|---|---|---|---|
| 2017 | Robion/Avignon (France) | 3rd place, bronze medalist(s) | Team |
| 2019 | Lac la Biche (Canada) | 1st place, gold medalist(s) | Team |
| 2019 | Lac la Biche (Canada) | 1st place, gold medalist(s) | Individual |
| 2022 | Terni (Italy) | 1st place, gold medalist(s) | Individual |
| 2022 | Terni (Italy) | 2nd place, silver medalist(s) | Mixed Team |
| 2024 | Mokrice (Slovenia) | 1st place, gold medalist(s) | Mixed Team |
World Field Archery Championships
| Edition | Place | Medal | Event |
| 2022 | Yankton (United States) | 1st place, gold medalist(s) | Individual |
| 2022 | Yankton (United States) | 3rd place, bronze medalist(s) | Mixed Team |
European Archery 3D Championships
| Edition | Place | Medal | Event |
| 2018 | Gothenburg (Sweden) | 3rd place, bronze medalist(s) | Team |
| 2023 | Cesana Torinese (Italy) | 1st place, gold medalist(s) | Mixed Team |
European Archery Field Championships
| Edition | Place | Medal | Event |
| 2019 | Mokrice (Slovenia) | 2nd place, silver medalist(s) | Individual |
| 2019 | Mokrice (Slovenia) | 3rd place, bronze medalist(s) | Team |
| 2021 | Porec (Croatia) | 1st place, gold medalist(s) | Mixed Team |
| 2023 | Cesana Torinese (Italy) | 3rd place, bronze medalist(s) | Individual |
| 2023 | Cesana Torinese (Italy) | 1st place, gold medalist(s) | Mixed Team |
| 2025 | Ksiaz (Poland) | 2nd place, silver medalist(s) | Individual |
| 2025 | Ksiaz (Poland) | 2nd place, silver medalist(s) | Mixed Team |
European Archery Indoor Championships
| Edition | Place | Medal | Event |
| 2025 | Samsun (Turkey) | 3rd place, bronze medalist(s) | Individual |
| 2025 | Samsun (Turkey) | 2nd place, silver medalist(s) | Team |
