= Fawn Girard =

American archer (born 1978)

Personal information
- Born: December 20, 1978 (age 47)
- Home town: Martinsville, Ohio, U.S.

Sport
- Sport: Archery
- Event: Barebow
Medal record
Women's barebow
Representing the United States
World Field Championships
Gold medal – first place	2024 Lac La Biche	Individual
Silver medal – second place	2018 Cortina	Individual
Silver medal – second place	2024 Lac La Biche	Team
Silver medal – second place	2024 Lac La Biche	Mixed team
World 3D Championships
Bronze medal – third place	2019 Lac La Biche	Team
Pan American Championships
Gold medal – first place	2023 Puerto Iguazú	Individual
Gold medal – first place	2023 Puerto Iguazú	Mixed team
Gold medal – first place	2025 San Cristóbal de las Casas	Individual
Gold medal – first place	2025 San Cristóbal de las Casas	Team
Silver medal – second place	2022 Santiago	Individual
Silver medal – second place	2022 Santiago	Team
Silver medal – second place	2023 Puerto Iguazú	Team
World Games
Bronze medal – third place	2025 Chengdu	Individual

Fawn Girard (born December 20, 1978) is an American archer competing in women's barebow events. She is a World Field Champion and four-time Pan American Champion.

== Career ==
Girard made her international debut at the 2017 World Archery 3D Championships. In September 2019, she competed at the 2019 World Archery 3D Championships and won a bronze medal in the team event.

In October 2022, she competed at the 2022 World Field Archery Championships, and lost to Megumi Masaki 37–41 in the bronze medal match. In November 2022, she competed at the 2022 Pan American Archery Championships and won a silver medal in the individual and team event.

In November 2023, she competed at the 2023 Pan American Archery Championships and won gold medals in the individual and mixed team events, and a silver medal in the women's team event.

In September 2024, she competed at the 2024 World Field Archery Championships and won a gold medal in the individual event, and silver medals in the women's team and mixed team events. She became the first American to win barebow gold at the World Field Archery Championships since Becky Nelson-Harris in 2008.

In August 2025, she competed at the 2025 World Games and won a bronze medal in the individual event. In October 2025, she competed at the 2025 Pan American Field Archery Championships and won gold medals in the individual and team events.

== Personal life ==
Girard is an intervention specialist in the Hillsboro City Schools, teaching third grade math.
