= Cinzia Noziglia =

Italian archer (born 1984)

Personal information
- Born: 10 November 1984 (age 41) Rapallo, Italy

Sport
- Country: Italy
- Sport: Archery
- Event: Barebow
- Club: Gruppo Sportivo Della Polizia Di Stato - Fiamme Oro - Italian National Team
Medal record
Women's Archery
Representing Italy
European Indoor Championships
Gold medal – first place	2026 Plovdiv	Team
Gold medal – first place	2026 Plovdiv	Mixed Team
Silver medal – second place	2026 Plovdiv	Individual

Cinzia Noziglia (born November 10, 1984) is an Italian athlete who competes in barebow archery.

== Career ==
In the 3D event, she has won six gold medals, four silver medals, and two bronze medals at the European level, while at the World level, she has won five gold medals, one silver medal, and two bronze medals, including medals won in the women's team (primarily with Irene Franchini and Sabrina Vannini) and in the mixed event.

She has won three medals at the World Games between 2017 and 2025, and five medals at the European Indoor Archery Championships between 2022 and 2025.

== International Palmarés ==
	World Games		
Year	Place	Medal	Event
2017	Wrocław, Poland	Gold	Individual
2022	Birmingham, United States	Gold	Individual
2025	Chengdu, China	Silver	Individual
World Archery 3D Championships
Year	Place	Medal	Event
2013	Sassari, Italy	Gold	Women's Team
2015	Terni, Italy	Silver	Women's Team
2015	Terni, Italy	Gold	Individual
2017	Robion, France	Gold	Women's Team
2017	Robion, France	Bronze	Individual
2022	Terni, Italy	Bronze	Mixed Team
2022	Terni, Italy	Gold	Individual
2024	Mokrice, Slovenia	Gold	Women's Team
2024	Mokrice, Slovenia	Gold	Individual
World Field Archery Championships
Year	Place	Medal	Event
2022	Yankton, United States	Gold	Women's Team
2022	Yankton, United States	Gold	Individual
2024	Lac La Biche, Canada	Gold	Women's Team
2024	Lac La Biche, Canada	Gold	Mixed Team
European Archery 3D Championships
Year	Place	Medal	Event
2016	Mokrice, Slovenia	Silver	Women's Team
2018	Gothenburg, Sweden	Bronze	Women's Team
2018	Gothenburg, Sweden	Silver	Individual
2021	Maribor, Slovenia	Gold	Mixed Team
2021	Maribor, Slovenia	Gold	Women's Team
2021	Maribor, Slovenia	Bronze	Individual
2023	Cesana Torinese, Italy	Gold	Mixed Team
2023	Cesana Torinese, Italy	Silver	Individual
2025	Divcibare, Serbia	Gold	Women's Team
2025	Divcibare, Serbia	Silver	Individual
European Archery Championships Indoor
Year	Place	Medal	Event
2022	Laško, Slovenia	Gold	Individual
2022	Laško, Slovenia	Gold	Team
2024	Varaždin, Croatia	Silver	Individual
2025	Samsun, Turkey	Gold	Team
2025	Samsun, Turkey	Bronze	Individual
