= Giuliano Faletti =

Italian archer (born 1992)

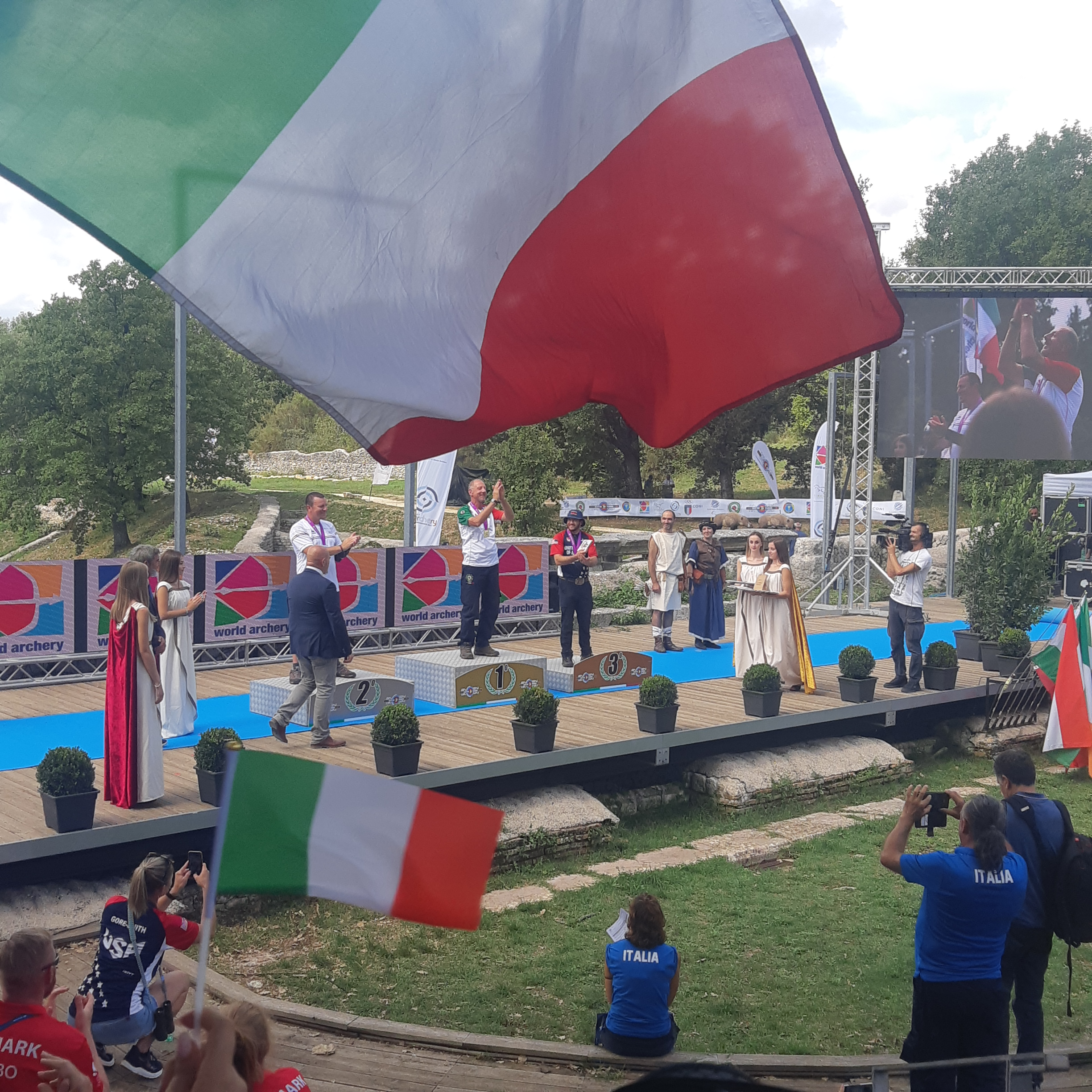
- Giuliano Faletti (first),Guillaume Quetel and Butts Shiloh Terni 2022 3D longbow

Personal information
- Born: 1956 (age 69–70)

Sport
- Country: Italy
- Sport: Archery
- Event: Instinctive bowLongbow
- Club: A.S.D. Arcieri Delle Alpi - Italian National Team
Medal record
Men's Archery
Representing Italy
- Updated on 14 January 2026

Giuliano Faletti (born 1956) is an Italian archer. He began practicing archery in 2005 using the instinctive (now traditional) bow and then switched to the longbow with which he currently competes. After his initial successes, he suffered from target panic, a discomfort he overcame with patience and practice, repeatedly practicing the movement of shooting the arrow without thinking about the target placed a short distance away. During this period, he tried to perfect the movement without trying to understand it, allowing his mind to memorize the movement to achieve a more ingrained instinct.

At world level he won two gold medals in the 3D specialty.

== Medal table ==
Longbow
World Archery 3D Championships
Edition	Place	Medal	Event
2013	Sassari (Italy) (instinctive bow)	Bronze	Individual
2017	Robion/Avignon (France)	Bronze	Individual
2019	Lac la Biche (Canada)	Bronze	Individual
2019	Lac la Biche (Canada)	Bronze	Team
2022	Terni (Italy)	Gold	Individual
2022	Terni (Italy)	Gold	Team
2022	Terni (Italy)	Silver	Mixed Team
European Archery 3D Championships
Edition	Place	Medal	Event
2016	Mokrice (Slovenia)	Bronze	Individual
2016	Mokrice (Slovenia)	Gold	Team
2021	Maribor (Slovenia)	Silver	Mixed Team
2021	Maribor (Slovenia)	Bronze	Team
