= César Vera Bringas =

Spanish archer (born 1963)

Personal information
- Born: 2 April 1963 (age 63)

Sport
- Country: Spain
- Sport: Archery
- Event: Barebow
- Club: Spanish National Team
Medal record
Man's Archery
Representing Spain
- Updated on 17 January 2029

César Vera Bringas (born 1963) is a Spanish athlete who competes in archery, in the Barebow category.

He won two gold and two silver medals at the World Archery 3D Championships. At the European Archery 3D Championships, he won two gold, four silver, and one bronze medals. She won a bronze medal at the 2025 World Games in the individual event.

Longbow
World Archery 3D Championships
Year	Place	Medal	Event
2017	Aviñón (FRA)	Gold	Individual
2017	Aviñón (FRA)	Silver	Team
2024	Mokrice (SLO)	Silver	Mixed team
2024	Mokrice (SLO)	Gold	Team
European Archery 3D Championships
Year	Place	Medal	Event
2018	Gotemburgo (SWE)	Bronze	Individual
2021	Maribor (SLO)	Silver	Individual
2021	Maribor (SLO)	Silver	Team
2023	Cesana Torinese (ITA)	Gold	Individual
2023	Cesana Torinese (ITA)	Silver	Mixed team
2025	Divčibare (SRB)	Gold	Individual
2025	Divčibare (SRB)	Silver	Mixed team
World Games
Year	Place	Medal	Event
2025	Chengdu (CHI)	Bronze	Individual
