= 2021 European Archery 3D Championships =

Archery competition

- Venue: Church of Saint Bolfenk (Cerkev Svetega Bolfenka)
- Location: Maribor, Slovenia
- Start date: 29 August
- End date: 04 September

The 2021 European Archery 3D Championships took place in Maribor, Slovenia from 29 August to 4 September 2021. These are part of the European Archery Championships organized by World Archery Europe (WAE). This is the first edition in which the mixed team competition was introduced. Videos of the final day are available online, featuring the individual, team, and mixed team medal challenges.

== Medal table ==
* Host nation (Slovenia)

Rank	Nation	Gold	Silver	Bronze	Total
1	Italy	4	3	5	12
2	Austria	4	2	1	7
3	Sweden	3	1	1	5
4	Spain	1	2	1	4
5	Denmark	1	0	0	1
5	Norway	1	0	0	1
7	Russia	0	2	2	4
8	Finland	0	1	2	3
9	Estonia	0	1	1	2
10	Latvia	0	1	0	1
10	Slovenia	0	1	0	1
12	France	0	0	1	1
Totals (12 entries)		14	14	14	42

== Medal summary ==
=== Elite events ===
Event	Gold	Silver	Bronze
Men's Events
Compound Men's individual	Nico Wiener; Austria	Mikael Anderle; Sweden	Jesse Sut; Italy
Barebow Men's individual	Leo Pettersson; Sweden	César Vera Bringas; Spain	Vitalii Budiak; Russia
Longbow Men's individual	Franz Harg; Austria	Kristaps Novads; Latvia	Mikhail Poddevalin; Russia
Instinctive bow Men's individual	Terje Bakke; Norway	Fedele Soria; Italy	Brian Pedersen; Sweden
Men's team	Austria; Franz Harg; Alois Steinwender; Nico Wiener	Spain; Jairo Valentín Fernández Álvarez; Jorge Sacristan Llados; César Vera Bringas	Italy; Giuliano Faletti; Alessandro Rigamonti; Jesse Sut
Women's Events
Compound Women's individual	Irene Franchini; Italy	Anne Laurila; Finland	Monica Finessi; Italy
Barebow Women's individual	Stine Asell; Sweden	Yulia Blanter; Russia	Cinzia Noziglia; Italy
Longbow Women's individual	Encarna Garrido Lázaro; Spain	Ylle Kell; Estonia	Inge Sirkel-Suviste; Estonia
Instinctive bow Women's individual	Michela Donati; Italy	Karin Novi; Austria	Sabrina Vannini; Italy
Women's team	Italy; Irene Franchini; Cinzia Noziglia; Iuana Bassi	Austria; Ingrid Ronacher; Beate Schölmberger; Ulrike Steinwender	Finland; Inke Alaja; Kirsi Andström; Anne Laurila
Mixed Events
Compound Mixed team	Sweden; Ida Karlsson; Mikael Anderle	Italy; Irene Franchini; Jesse Sut	Finland; Anne Laurila; Pekka Loitokari
Barebow Mixed team	Italy; Cinzia Noziglia; Alessandro Rigamonti	Russia; Yulia Blanter; Vitalii Budiak	Spain; Casandra Campo Tellez; César Vera Bringas
Longbow Mixed team	Austria; Beate Schölmberger; Franz Harg	Italy; Paola Sacchetti; Giuliano Faletti	France; Daniele Ramos; Robin Gardeur
Instinctive bow Mixed team	Denmark; Rikke Holten; Frank Christiansen	Slovenia; Mojca Pavacic; Kristijan Horvat	Austria; Karin Novi; Klaus Grünsteidl
