= Oliver Øchkenholt =

Danish archer (born 1992)

Personal information
- Born: 1992 (age 33–34)

Sport
- Country: Denmark
- Sport: Archery
- Event: Barebow
- Club: Danish National Team
Medal record
Men's Archery
Representing Denmark
- Updated on 15 January 2026

Oliver Øchkenholt (born 1992) is a Danish archer who competes in Barebow archery.

In the 3D specialty he won a gold medal at the european level in the team with Klaes Andersen Zibrandt Christensen and Mathias Nedergård Nielsen, while at the world level he won a gold medal.

== Medal table ==
Barebow
World Archery 3D Championships
Edition	Place	Medal	Event
2024	Mokrice (Slovenia)	1st place, gold medalist(s)	Individual
European Archery 3D Championships
Edition	Place	Medal	Event
2025	Divčibare (Serbia)	1st place, gold medalist(s)	Team
Indoor Archery World Series
Edition	Place	Medal	Event
2024	Nîmes (France)	1st place, gold medalist(s)	Individual
