= 2019 World Archery 3D Championships =

Archery championship

- Location: Lac la Biche, Canada
- Start date: 02 September
- End date: 07 September
- Competitors: 265 from 25 nations

The 2019 World Archery 3D Championships took place in Lac La Biche, Alberta (Canada), from September 2 to September 7, 2019. France confirmed itself as the most successful nation.

== Medal summary ==
=== Elite events ===
Games	Gold	Silver	Bronze
Men's Events
Barebow Men's individual	David Jackson; France	Fredrik Lundmark; Sweden	Dewayne Martin; United States
Compound Men's individual	Gyorgy Gondan; Hungary	Giuseppe Seimandi; Italy	Nico Wiener; Austria
Longbow Men's individual	Mikhail Poddevalin; Russia	Luis Rossi; Uruguay	Giuliano Faletti; Italy
Traditional Men's individual	Ferenc Molnar; Hungary	Kenneth Rienas; United States	Fabio Pittaluga; Italy
Men's team	France; Robin Gardeur; Christophe Grivotet; David Jackson	Sweden; Mikael Anderle; Fredrik Lundmark; Yngve Malmström	Italy; Giuliano Faletti; Alessio Noceti; Jesse Sut
Women's Events
Barebow Women's individual	Christine Gauthe; France	Stine Asell; Sweden	Lina Bjorklund; Sweden
Compound Women's individual	Ingrid Ronacher; Austria	Elodie Galvez; France	Irene Franchini; Italy
Longbow Women's individual	Leena-Kaarina Saviluoto; Sweden	Encarna Garrido Lázaro; Spain	Geraldine Ellermann; Austria
Traditional Women's individual	Karin Novi; Austria	Michela Donati; Italy	Trudy Dryden; Canada
Women's team	France; Elodie Galvez; Christine Gauthe; Daniele Ramos	Canada; Trudy Dryden; Monica Higgins; Miranda Sparkes	United States; Fawn Girard; Heather Gore; Amber Yott

== Medal table ==
Host country Italy

Pos.	Country	Gold	Silver	Bronze	Tot.
1	France	4	1	0	5
2	Austria	2	0	2	4
3	Hungary	2	0	0	2
4	Sweden	1	3	1	5
5	Russia	1	0	0	1
6	Italy	0	2	4	6
7	United States	0	1	2	3
8	Canada	0	1	1	2
9	Spain	0	0	1	1
9	Uruguay	0	0	1	1
