= Fabio Pittaluga =

Italian archer (born 1965)

Personal information
- Born: 17 May 1965 (age 61) Genoa, Italy

Sport
- Country: Italy
- Sport: 3D archery
- Event: Instinctive/Traditional bow
- Club: A.S.D. Arcieri Del Medio Chienti - Italian National Team
Medal record
Men's Archery
Representing Italy
World Archery 3D Championships
Silver medal – second place	2009 Latina (ITA)	Individual
Bronze medal – third place	2015 Terni (ITA)	Individual
Bronze medal – third place	2019 Lac La Biche (CAN)	Individual)
European Archery 3D Championships
Bronze medal – third place	2008 Punta Umbria (ESP)	Individual
Gold medal – first place	2010 Sassari (ITA)	Individual
Gold medal – first place	2014 Tallinn (EST)	Individual
Gold medal – first place	2016 Mokrice (SLO)	Individual
Gold medal – first place	2023 Cesana (ITA)	Mixed Team
- Updated on 08 January 2026

Fabio Pittaluga (born 17 May 1965) is an Italian archer who competes in 3D archery, in the traditional bow modality.

He began competing at a regional level in 2003 using the barebow and in 2007 he took part in his first Italian 3D Championship organised by FITARCO in Cerreto Laghi (RE) where he came fourth overall, in 2008 he changed the type of bow and switched to the instinctive bow (which was recently called the Traditional bow) and in the same year he won a gold medal at the Italian championships and a bronze at the European championships at an individual level. In 2010 he won the European title, a video of which was filmed by the national broadcaster RAI is available online.

In the world competitions in 2009 in Latina he won a silver medal in the individual event and confirmed his high level with bronze medals in Terni in 2015 and in Lac La Biche in 2019.

After winning three individual European titles, in 2023 in Cesana Torinese he won gold together with Sabrina Vannini in the traditional bow mixed team category.

In addition to competing, he is currently on the FITARCO National Field and 3D team staff with the official role of "Technical Support." He works closely with Technical Director Giorgio Botto and the other federal coaches (Daniele Bellotti and Antonio Tosco) to prepare athletes for international competitions.
