= Alicia Baumert =

French archer (born 2000)

Personal information
- Born: 28 April 2000 (age 26)

Sport
- Country: France
- Sport: Archery
- Event: Barebow
- Club: French National Team
- Updated on 14 January 2026

Alicia Baumert (born 28 April 2000) is a French archer.

At the 2025 World Archery Games in Chengdu, Alicia Baumert won the gold medal in barebow.

At world level, she won four gold medals in the 3D specialty and one in the Field.

== Medal table ==
Barebow
World Games
Edition	Place	Medal	Event
2025	Chengdu (China)	1st place, gold medalist(s)	Individual
World Archery 3D Championships
Edition	Place	Medal	Event
2024	Mokrice (Slovenia)	1st place, gold medalist(s)	Mixed Team
European Archery 3D Championships
Edition	Place	Medal	Event
2023	Cesana Torinese (Italy)	3rd place, bronze medalist(s)	Individual
2023	Cesana Torinese (Italy)	1st place, gold medalist(s)	Mixed Team
2023	Cesana Torinese (Italy)	2nd place, silver medalist(s)	Team
2025	Divčibare (Slovenia)	3rd place, bronze medalist(s)	Individual
2025	Divčibare (Slovenia)	3rd place, bronze medalist(s)	Team
European Archery Field Championships
Edition	Place	Medal	Event
2023	Cesana Torinese (Italy)	1st place, gold medalist(s)	Individual
2023	Cesana Torinese (Italy)	1st place, gold medalist(s)	Mixed Team
2023	Cesana Torinese (Italy)	1st place, gold medalist(s)	Team
2025	Ksiaz (Poland)	3rd place, bronze medalist(s)	Individual
2025	Ksiaz (Poland)	2nd place, silver medalist(s)	Mixed Team
2025	Ksiaz (Poland)	2nd place, silver medalist(s)	Team
