= World Archery 3D Championships =

Series of international sports competitions

The World Archery 3D Championships, an international competitions in 3D Archery take place every two years and are organized by World Archery. Archers compete in four bow divisions: Barebow, Compound bow, Longbow, Traditional bow, plus team events (consisting of four archers, one from each division) and mixed teams (female and male from each division).

== Championships ==
Num.	Edition	Location	Events
1	2003	(France) Sully-sur-Loire	8
2	2005	(Italy) Genoa	8
3	2007	(Hungary) Sopron	10
4	2009	(Italy) Latina	10
5	2011	(Austria) Donnersbach	10
6	2013	(Italy) Sassari	10
7	2015	(Italy) Terni	10
8	2017	(France) Robion/Avignon	10
9	2019	(Canada) Lac la Biche	10
10	2022	(Italy) Terni	14
11	2024	(Slovenia) Mokrice	14
12	2026	(United States) Yankton	14

=== Champions ===
==== Men ====
Edition Year	Location	Barebow	Compound	Longbow	Instinctive Traditional	Team	Ref
2003	(France) Sully-sur-Loire	Daniele Bellotti (ITA)	Robert Eyler (USA)	José Luis Iriarte (ESP)		United States	
2005	(Italy) Genova	Andrej Natlačen (SLO)	Tommy Gomez (USA)	Szilárd Hegedűs (HUN)		Italy	
2007	(Hungary) Sopron	Giuseppe Seimandi (ITA)	David Rebec (SLO)	Davide Govoni (ITA)	Aare Lauren (EST)	Italy	
2009	(Italy) Latina	Ziplies Hartmut (SWE)	José María Rodríguez (ESP)	Steve Morley (EST)	Alfredo Dondi (ITA)	France	
2011	(Austria) Donnersbach	Bobby Larsson (SWE)	Herwig Haunschmid (AUT)	Paolo Bucci (ITA)	Peter Garrett (CAN)	France; Christel Puig; Serge Corvino; Corentin Doat	
2013	(Italy) Sassari	David García (ESP)	Dave Cousins (USA)	Giacomo Luca Fantozzi (ITA)	Wolfgang Ocenasek (AUT)	Denmark; Stig Andersen; Tom Hauberg Rask Nielsen; Claus Larsen	
2015	(Italy) Terni	Sebastián Juanola (ESP)	Nico Wiener (AUT)	Per Ivar Pahlm (NOR)	Ferenc Molnár (HUN)	Spain; Joaquín Mérida; José Luis Iriarte; David García	
2017	(France) Robion/Avignon	César Vera (ESP)	Joan Pauner (FRA)	Robin Gardeur (FRA)	Zibrandt Christensen (DEN)	United States; Dewayne Martin; Dalton Richardson; Calvin Smock	
2019	(Canada) Lac La Biche	David Jackson (FRA)	György Gondán (HUN)	Mikhail Poddevalin (RUS)	Ferenc Molnár (HUN)	France; Robin Gardeur; Christophe Grivotet; David Jackson	
2022	(Italy) Terni	David Jackson (FRA)	Nico Wiener (AUT)	Giuliano Faletti (ITA)	Klaus Grünsteidl (AUT)	Italy; Marco Bruno; Giuliano Faletti; Giuseppe Seimandi	
2024	(Slovenia) Mokrice	Oliver Øchkenholt (DEN)	Mikael Anderle (SWE)	Ian Edwards (GBR)	Jed Cullen (GBR)	Spain; César Vera; Jairo Valentín; Bienvenido Moreno; Óscar Amate	
2026	(United States) Yankton	David Jackson (FRA)	Tim Jevšnik (SLO)	Mikhail Poddevalin (RUS)	Zibrandt Christensen (DEN)	France; Rémy Albanese; Jérémie Buon; Robin Gardeur; David Jackson	

==== Women ====
Edition Year	Location	Barebow	Compound	Longbow	Instinctive Traditional	Team	Ref
2003	(France) Sully-sur-Loire	Staša Podgoršek (SLO)	Mikaelle Hubert (FRA)	Giuliana Caputo (ITA)		France	
2005	(Italy) Genoa	Françoise Perrinel (FRA)	Erika Bruderer (SUI)	Giulia Barbaro (ITA)		France	
2007	(Hungary) Sopron	Reingild Linhart (AUT)	Beáta Király (HUN)	Urte Paulus (AUT)	Francesca Rossignoli (ITA)	Hungary	
2009	(Italy) Latina	Chantal Porte (FRA)	Violette Saubion (FRA)	Giulia Barbaro (ITA)	Monica Finessi (ITA)	Hungary	
2011	(Austria) Donnersbach	Andrea Raigel (AUT)	Lucy Holderness (GBR)	Encarna Garrido (ESP)	Christa Ocenasek (AUT)	France; Rachel Terrasse; Sophie Cluze; Chantal Porte	
2013	(Italy) Sassari	Gloria Villa (ITA)	Deborah Courpron (FRA)	Sophie Cluze (FRA)	Christa Ocenasek (AUT)	Italy; Sonia Bianchi; Giulia Barbaro; Cinzia Noziglia	
2015	(Italy) Terni	Cinzia Noziglia (ITA)	Anne Lantee (FIN)	Donatella Rizzi (ITA)	Rossella Bertoglio (ITA)	Spain; Elena Rodríguez; Encarna Garrido; Begoña Pérez	
2017	(France) Robion/Avignon	Jessica Lindblom (SWE)	Aude Ama (FRA)	Giulia Barbaro (ITA)	Heldis Zahlberger (AUT)	Italy; Irene Franchini; Giulia Barbaro; Cinzia Noziglia	
2019	(Canada) Lac La Biche	Christina Gauthe (FRA)	Ingrid Ronacher (AUT)	Leena-Kaarina Saviluoto (SWE)	Karin Novi (AUT)	France; Elodie Galvez; Christine Gauthe; Daniele Ramos	
2022	(Italy) Terni	Cinzia Noziglia (ITA)	Elisa Baldo (ITA)	Cecilia Santacroce (ITA)	Claudia Weinberger (AUT)	Denmark; Kristina Bejder; Stine Hansen; Kirstine Godskesen Klausen	
2024	(Slovenia) Mokrice	Cinzia Noziglia (ITA)	Irene Franchini (ITA)	Cecilia Santacroce (ITA)	Sabrina Vannini (ITA)	Italy; Sabrina Vannini; Irene Franchini; Iuana Bassi; Cinzia Noziglia	
2026	(United States) Yankton	Virginie Chevrier (FRA)	Aude Ama-Cormerais (FRA)	Johanna Pitschmann (AUT)	Judith Wenzl (GER)	Austria; Rosemarie Leitner; Johanna Pitschmann; Ingrid Ronacher; Claudia Weinberger	

==== Mixed ====
Edition Year	Location	Barebow team	Compound team	Longbow team	Traditional team	Ref
2022	(Italy) Terni	Sweden; Stine Asell; Fredrik Lundmark	Italy; Marco Bruno; Irene Franchini	Spain; Jairo Valentín; Encarna Garrido	Austria; Claudia Weinberger; Klaus Grünsteidl	
2024	(Slovenia) Mokrice	France; David Jackson; Alicia Baumert	Italy; Marco Bruno; Irene Franchini	Spain; Jairo Valentín; Encarna Garrido	Austria; Claudia Weinberger; Reinhard Leixner	
2026	(United States) Yankton	Russia; Kseniia Mitulia; Vitalii Budiak	Austria; Ingrid Ronacher; Nico Wiener	France; Cécile Lafaurie; Robin Gardeur	Czech Republic; Martina Blahušová; Tomáš Rožnovský	

== See also ==
- World Archery Championships
