= Iuana Bassi =

Italian archer (born 1952)

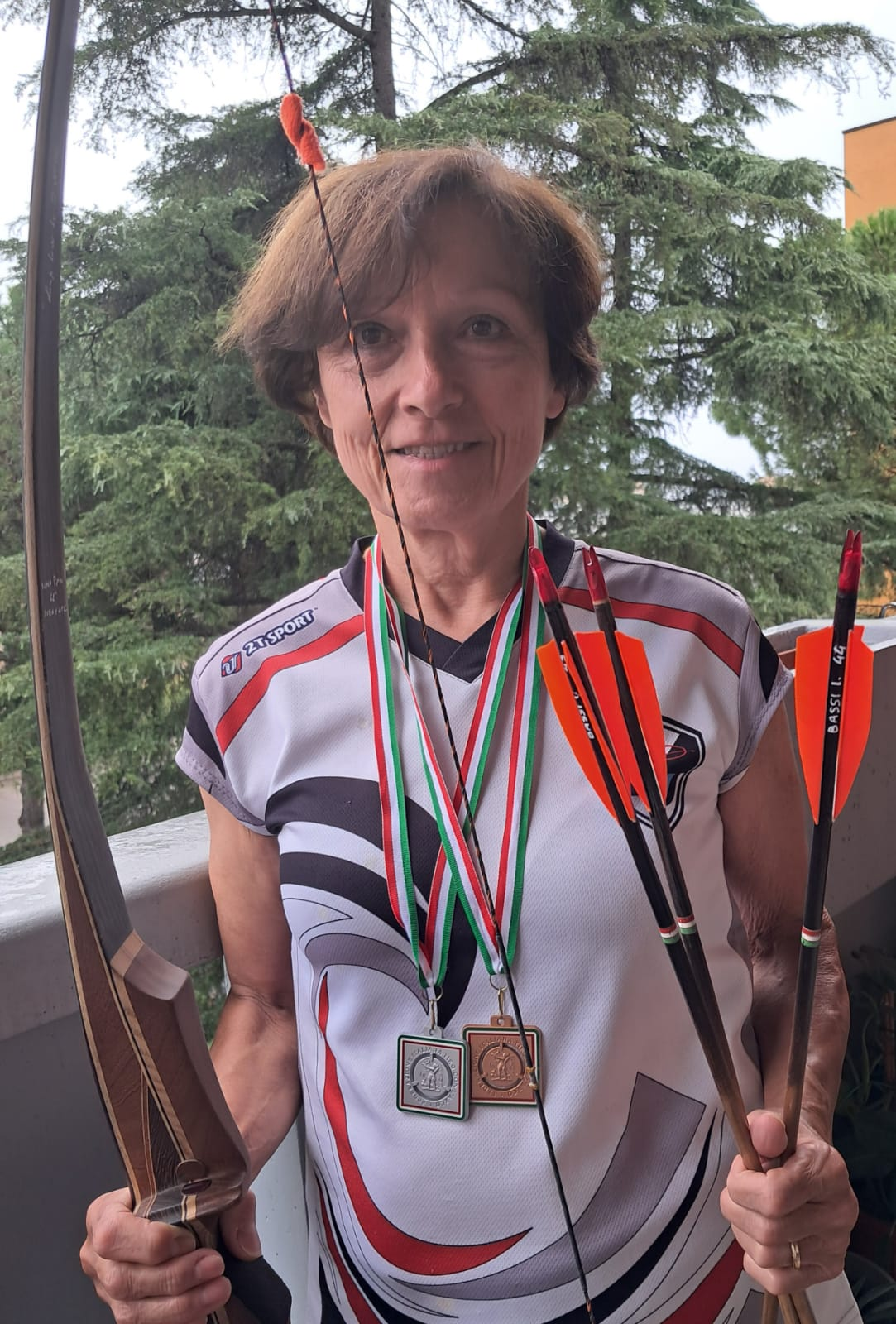

Personal information
- Born: 21 January 1952 (age 74) Imola, Italy

Sport
- Country: Italy
- Sport: Archery
- Event: Instinctive/Traditional bow – Longbow
- Club: A.S.D. Arcieri Tigullio – Italian National Team
Medal record
Women's Archery
Representing Italy
World Archery 3D Championships
Bronze medal – third place	2015 Terni (ITA)	Individual (Instinctive bow)
Bronze medal – third place	2017 Avignon (FRA)	Individual (Instinctive bow)
Silver medal – second place	2022 Terni (ITA)	Individual (Longbow)
Gold medal – first place	2024 Mokrice (SLO)	Woman's Team (Longbow)
European Archery 3D Championships
Bronze medal – third place	2014 Tallinn (EST)	Individual (Instinctive bow)
Silver medal – second place	2018 Gothenburg (SWE)	Individual (Instinctive bow)
Gold medal – first place	2021 Maribor (SLO)	Woman's Team (Longbow)
Gold medal – first place	2023 Cesana (ITA)	Woman's Team (Longbow)
Gold medal – first place	2023 Cesana (ITA)	Mixed Team (Longbow)
- Updated on 07 January 2026

Iuana Bassi (Imola, 21 January 1952) is an Italian archer who competes in archery, in the longbow modality.

== Biografia ==
In 2003 she began practicing archery and in 2006 she took part in her first competitions, competing with the A.S.D. Arcieri Tigullio under the national coach, Mario Pede.

In 2007 she took part in her first Italian 3D Championship organised by Fitarco in Cerreto Laghi (RE) and in the same year in the 3D World Championships in Sopron, Hungary. In 2013 she switched from the longbow to the instinctive bow with which she won her first international medals.

In 2019 she returned to compete with the longbow, with which she won an individual silver medal in 2022 in Terni. In 2024 in Mokrice, together with Irene Franchini, Sabrina Vannini and Cinzia Noziglia, she won gold in the women's team.
