= Sabrina Vannini =

Italian archer (born 1971)

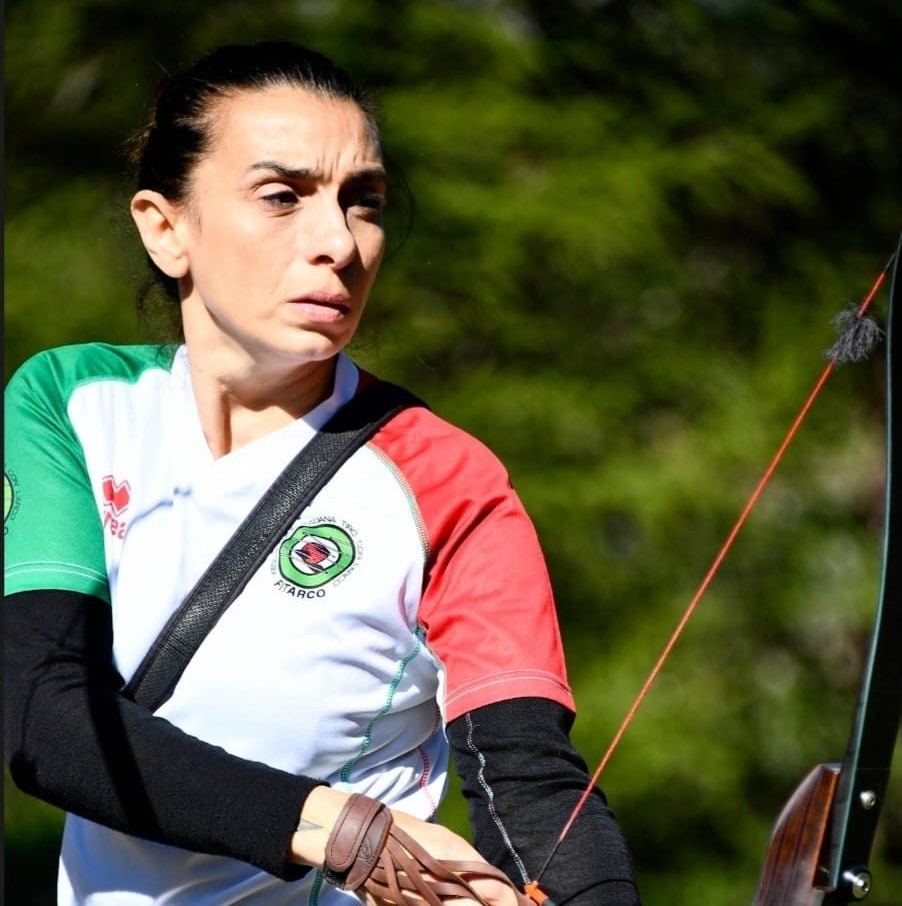
- Sabrina Vannini at the 2023 Cesana Torinese European Archery 3D Championships

Personal information
- Born: 21 October 1971 (age 55) Padua, Italy

Sport
- Country: Italy
- Sport: Archery
- Event: Traditional bow
- Club: A.S.D. Arcieri Citta' Di Terni - Italian National Team
Medal record
Women's Archery
Representing Italy
World 3D Championships Traditional Bow
Bronze medal – third place	2022 Terni (ITA)	Mixed Team
Silver medal – second place	2022 Terni (ITA)	Individual
Gold medal – first place	2024 Mokrice (SLO)	Woman's Team
Gold medal – first place	2024 Mokrice (SLO)	Individual
HDH IAA World Archery 3D Championships TRRB
Gold medal – first place	Moosburg (AUT) 2024	individual
European 3D Championships Traditional Bow
Gold medal – first place	2018 Gothenburg (SWE)	Individual
Bronze medal – third place	2021 Maribor (SLO)	Individual
Gold medal – first place	2023 Cesana (ITA)	Mixed Team
Gold medal – first place	2023 Cesana (ITA)	Individual
Gold medal – first place	2025 Divcibare (SRB)	Woman's Team
Bronze medal – third place	2025 Divcibare (SRB)	Individual
HDH IAA European 3D Archery Championships TRRB
Gold medal – first place	Alba Iulia (ROM) 2023	individual
Italian Traditional Bow Championships FITARCO
Gold medal – first place	Avellino 2016	individual
Silver medal – second place	Lago Laceno (AV) 2018	individual
Gold medal – first place	Finale Ligure (SV) 2019	individual
Gold medal – first place	Lago Laceno (AV) 2021	individual
Gold medal – first place	San Vero Milis (OR) 2022	individual
Gold medal – first place	San Vero Milis (OR) 2022	Mixed Team
Gold medal – first place	Terni 2023	individual
Silver medal – second place	Polino (TR) 2025	Mixed Team
Gold medal – first place	Polino (TR) 2025	individual
Silver medal – second place	Schilpario (BG) 2026	Mixed Team
Gold medal – first place	Schilpario (BG) 2026	individual
Italian 3D Recurve Free Championships FIDASC
Gold medal – first place	Barga (LU) 2021	individual
Gold medal – first place	Bevagna (PG) 2022	individual
Italian 3D Traditional Recurve Championships FIDASC
Gold medal – first place	Chioggia (VE) 2024	individual
- Updated on 09 April 2025

Sabrina Vannini (Padua, 21 October 1971) is an Italian archer. Graduated in Political Science, in 2013 she attended a course in historical bow construction and subsequently began to practice the discipline of archery, she defines herself as the "woman of the woods", she competes with the Arcieri Città di Terni but is from Padua. Her training ground is the Euganean Hills. One of her bows was given to her by Allison Wright, a British archer who died prematurely.

== Career ==
In 2015 she took part in her first Italian Championship organized by Fitarco in Monte Livata-Subiaco (RM) where she came first in the qualifications and eighth in the eliminations. In 2016 in Avellino, after coming seventh in the qualifications, she obtained her first national success in the final against Iuana Bassi in the Instinctive Bow category. In 2017 in Pinerolo/Cantalupa she came second in the qualifications but did not go beyond fourth place in the eliminations. In 2018 in Lago Laceno (AV) she came first in the qualifications and second in the eliminations while at an international level she won the European Championship in Gothenburg (SWE) in the Instinctive Bow category.

In 2019 she opened her YouTube channel where she collects videos of her competitions, participations and interviews including one on Studio Aperto on the Italia 1 channel and on TGR Veneto on Rai 3. She also collects on her Facebook page personal photos and curiosities or those related to the discipline of archery, including the use of a photo that portrays her in the moment of shooting the arrow for the promotion of the 2024 World Field Archery Championships in Lac la Biche (Alberta) in Canada.

In the following years 2019 2021 2022 2023 she confirmed herself as Italian Fitarco Champion in the Instinctive Bow category, crowned by the double European gold in Cesana Torinese/San Sicario at individual level and in the mixed team together with Fabio Pittaluga.

In the world competitions in 2022 in Terni she won a bronze in the mixed team together with Fedele Soria and a silver at individual level, while in 2024 in Mokrice (SLO) together with Irene Franchini, Iuana Bassi and Cinzia Noziglia she won the gold in the women's team and the gold in the individual category Traditional bow.

In 2025, together with Nicola Kos, she won a splendid silver medal, surrendering only in the final to the Saltalamacchia-Pittaluga pair in the mixed team event, while in the individual event she wrote a new page in her career by winning her sixth Italian title in the instinctive bow where in the final she beat Patrizia Trefiletti (64-34). At an international level, she participated in the 3D European Championships in Divcibare, Serbia, where the weather greatly affected the performance of the challenges. After the qualifications with good weather, there were two days of stoppage caused by thick fog and subsequently by heavy snowfall (25cm). The final stages therefore favoured those who were used to facing decidedly low temperatures, but despite these adversities, together with Irene Franchini, Barbaro Giulia and Cinzia Noziglia, she won gold in the women's team and bronze in the individual Traditional Bow category.

Riser	Border
Limbs	Border Cv5
Arrows	Shaft: Gold Tip Ultra Light 700
