= Marco Bruno =

Marco Bruno may refer to:

- Marco Bruno (archer) (born 1992), Italian archer
- Marco Polo (producer) (born 1979), Canadian hip hop record producer
