= 2025 European Archery 3D Championships =

Archery competition

- Venue: Divčibare
- Location: Divčibare, Serbia
- Start date: 27 September
- End date: 05 October

The 2025 European Archery 3D Championships took place in Divčibare, Serbia from 27 September to 05 October 2025 where the weather greatly affected the performance of the challenges, after the qualifications with good weather, there were two days of stoppage caused by thick fog and subsequently by heavy snowfall (25cm). These are part of the European Archery Championships organized by World Archery Europe (WAE).There is a video of the final day online where you can see the snow still abundant on the competition field.

== Medal table ==
* Host nation (Serbia)

| Rank | Nation | Gold | Silver | Bronze | Total |
|---|---|---|---|---|---|
| 1 | Italy | 3 | 3 | 5 | 11 |
| 2 | Spain | 3 | 1 | 0 | 4 |
| 3 | Austria | 2 | 2 | 2 | 6 |
| 4 | Slovenia | 1 | 3 | 1 | 5 |
| 5 | Denmark | 1 | 1 | 1 | 3 |
| 5 | Great Britain | 1 | 1 | 1 | 3 |
| 7 | France | 1 | 0 | 2 | 3 |
| 8 | Germany | 1 | 0 | 0 | 1 |
| 8 | Slovakia | 1 | 0 | 0 | 1 |
| 10 | Finland | 0 | 2 | 0 | 2 |
| 11 | Norway | 0 | 1 | 0 | 1 |
| 12 | Individual Neutral Athletes | 0 | 0 | 1 | 1 |
| 12 | Sweden | 0 | 0 | 1 | 1 |
| Totals (13 entries) | | 14 | 14 | 14 | 42 |

== Medal summary ==
=== Men ===
| Event | Gold | Silver | Bronze |
|---|---|---|---|
| Compound individual | Staš Modic; Slovenia | Tim Jevšnik; Slovenia | Jesse Sut; Italy |
| Barebow individual | César Vera Bringas; Spain | Timotej Škerjanec; Slovenia | Giuseppe Seimandi; Italy |
| Longbow individual | Miguel Tovar; Spain | Klaes Andersen; Denmark | Enzo Lazzaroni; Italy |
| Traditionalbow individual | Michal Jellinek; Slovakia | Jed Cullen; Great Britain | Zibrandt Christensen; Denmark |
| Team | Denmark; Klaes Andersen; Zibrandt Christensen; Mathias Nedergård Nielsen; Oliver Øchkenholt | Slovenia; Staš Modic; Timotej Škerjanec; Marjan Kocman; Miha Šket | United Kingdom; James Annall; Zachary Ball; Jed Cullen; Ian Edwards |

=== Women ===
| Event | Gold | Silver | Bronze |
|---|---|---|---|
| Compound Women's individual | Aude Ama-Cormerais; France | Maddalena Marcaccini; Italy | Elisa Baldo; Italy |
| Barebow Women's individual | Rosemarie Leitner; Austria | Cinzia Noziglia; Italy | Alicia Baumert; France |
| Longbow Women's individual | Kristin Thannesberger; Austria | Paula Virmasalo; Finland | Liudmila Kurneeva; Individual Neutral Athletes |
| Traditionalbow Women's individual | Judith Wenzl; Germany | Monicha Nergaard; Norway | Sabrina Vannini; Italy |
| Women's team | Italy; Giulia Barbaro; Irene Franchini; Cinzia Noziglia; Sabrina Vannini | Austria; Rosemarie Leitner; Johanna Pitschmann; Ingrid Ronacher; Claudia Weinberger | France; Alicia Baumert; Nathalie Doux; Anne Sorais-Chateaugiron; Aude Ama-Cormerais |

=== Mixed ===
| Event | Gold | Silver | Bronze |
|---|---|---|---|
| Compound Mixed team | Italy; Irene Franchini; Jesse Sut | Finland; Anne Laurila; Timo Pirppu | Slovenia; Barbra Pia Krize; Stas Modic |
| Barebow Mixed team | Italy; Cinzia Noziglia; Giuseppe Seimandi | Spain; Ana Maria Cano Garcia; César Vera Bringas | Austria; Rosemarie Leitner; Christian Klein-Weinberger |
| Longbow Mixed team | Spain; Encarna Garrido Lázaro; Miguel Tovar | Italy; Giulia Barbaro; Enzo Lazzaroni | Austria; Johanna Pitschmann; Robert Engel |
| Traditionalbow Mixed team | United Kingdom; Natalie Stones; Jed Cullen | Austria; Claudia Weinberger; Reinhard Leixner | Sweden; Helena Osterlund; Johnny Kallenberg |
