= Elisa Baldo =

Italian archer (born 1986)

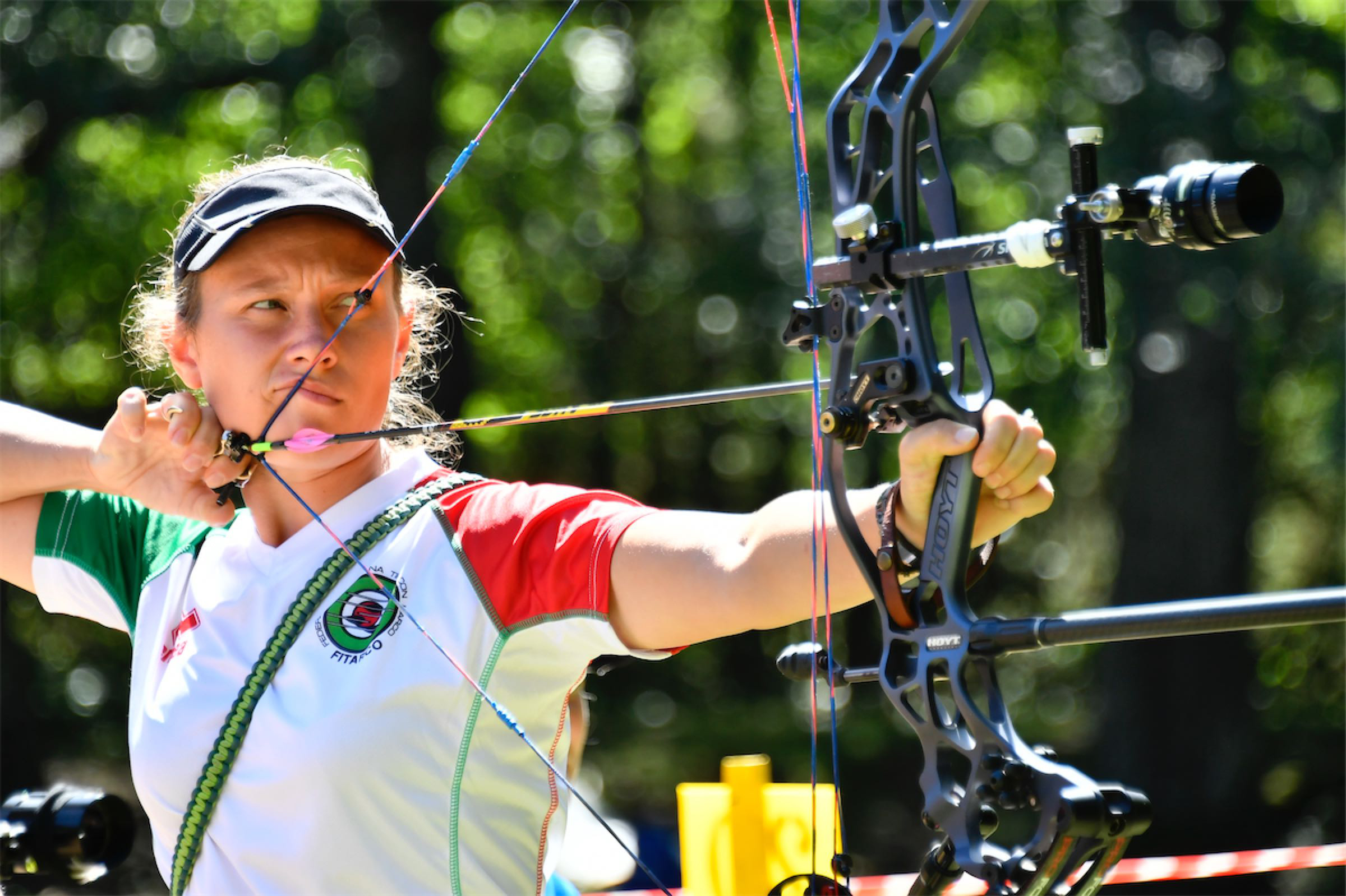
- Elisa Baldo at the 2022 World Archery 3D Championships in Terni

Personal information
- Born: 26 December 1986 (age 39) Camposampiero, Italy

Sport
- Country: Italy
- Sport: Archery
- Event: Compound bow
- Club: A.S.D. Arcieri Decumanus Maximus - Italian National Team
Medal record
Women's Archery
Representing Italy
World Archery 3D Championships
Gold medal – first place	2022 Terni (ITA)	Individual
Bronze medal – third place	2024 Mokrice (SLO)	Individual
European Archery 3D Championships
Bronze medal – third place	2025 Divcibare (SRB)	Individual
HDH IAA European 3D Archery Championships
Silver medal – second place	Spišské Vlachy (SLO) 2025	individual
Italian Championships FITARCO
Gold medal – first place	Lago Laceno (AV) 2018	individual
Silver medal – second place	Finale Ligure (SV) 2019	individual
Gold medal – first place	Lago Laceno (AV) 2021	individual
Gold medal – first place	San Vero Milis (OR) 2022	individual
Bronze medal – third place	Cuglieri -Torre del Pozzo (OR) 2024	individual
Silver medal – second place	Polino (TR) 2025	individual
Italian Field Archery Championships FIDASC
Gold medal – first place	Castellarano (RE) 2022	individual
Silver medal – second place	Castel di Sangro (AQ) 2023	Woman's Team
Silver medal – second place	Schilpario (BG) 2024	individual
- Updated on 06 January 2026

Elisa Baldo (Camposampiero, 26 December 1986) is an Italian archer who competes in compound bow archery.

== Biography ==
Baldo began competing at the regional level in 2008, and in 2018 she won her first Italian 3D Championship, organized by FITARCO in Lago Laceno (AV). She won again in 2021. She also participated in the Italian Field Archery Championships, where she won a gold medal in 2022 and a silver medal the following year.

In the 2022 World Archery 3D Championships in Terni she won a gold medal in the individual event, while in 2024 in Mokrice she won a bronze.

In 2025 she participated in the European Archery 3D Championships in Divčibare, Serbia, where she won bronze in the individual Compound Bow category.
