= 2018 European Archery 3D Championships =

Archery competition

- Venue: Garden Society of Gothenburg (Tradgardensforeginners)
- Location: Gothenburg, Sweden
- Start date: 18 September
- End date: 22 September

The 2018 European Archery 3D Championships took place in Gothenburg, Sweden from 18 to 22 September 2018. These are part of the European Archery Championships organized by World Archery Europe (WAE). The video of the final day with the medal challenges is available online.

== Medal table ==
* Host nation (Sweden)

Rank	Nation	Gold	Silver	Bronze	Total
1	Italy	4	2	4	10
2	Sweden	2	0	1	3
3	Denmark	1	2	2	5
4	Austria	1	1	0	2
5	Hungary	1	0	0	1
5	Latvia	1	0	0	1
7	Spain	0	3	2	5
8	France	0	1	1	2
9	Russia	0	1	0	1
Totals (9 entries)		10	10	10	30

== Medal summary ==
=== Elite events ===
Event	Gold	Silver	Bronze
Men's Events
Compound Men's individual	Giuseppe Seimandi; Italy	Stig Andersen; Denmark	Jesse Sut; Italy
Barebow Men's individual	Fredrik Lundmark; Sweden	David Garcia Fernandez; Spain	César Vera Bringas; Spain
Longbow Men's individual	Károly Hegedus; Hungary	Mikhail Poddevalin; Russia	Martin Jørgensen; Denmark
Instinctive bow Men's individual	Frank Christiansen; Denmark	Klaus Grünsteidl; Austria	Federico Perucchi; Italy
Men's team	Italy; Alfredo Dondi; Eric Esposito; Giuseppe Seimandi	Spain; David Garcia Fernandez; Jose Luis Iriarte Larumbe; Joaquin Merida Rodriguez	France; Robin Gardeur; David Jackson; Joan Pauner
Women's Events
Compound Women's individual	Irene Franchini; Italy	Kirstine Godskesen Klausen; Denmark	Pernille Olsen; Denmark
Barebow Women's individual	Ulrike Steinwender; Austria	Cinzia Noziglia; Italy	Lina Bjorklund; Sweden
Longbow Women's individual	Ketija Neringa-Martinsone; Latvia	Encarna Garrido Lázaro; Spain	Paola Sacchetti; Italy
Instinctive bow Women's individual	Sabrina Vannini; Italy	Iuana Bassi; Italy	Begona Perez Garrido; Spain
Women's team	Sweden; Lina Bjorklund; Leena-Kaarina Saviluoto; Lisa Sodersten	France; Elodie Galvez; Christine Gauthe; Daniele Ramos	Italy; Irene Franchini; Cinzia Noziglia; Paola Sacchetti
