= Marco Bruno (archer) =

Italian archer (born 1992)

Personal information
- Born: 25 January 1992 (age 34) Cirié, Italy

Sport
- Country: Italy
- Sport: Archery
- Event: Compound bow
- Club: Gruppo Sportivo Fiamme Azzurre - Italian National Team
Medal record
Men's Archery
Representing Italy
- Updated on 12 January 2026

Marco Bruno (Cirié, 25 January 1992) is an Italian archer who competes in compound bow archery.

In the 3D specialty he won a gold medal at european level, while at world level he won three gold medals and two bronze, also considering the medals won in the team with Giuliano Faletti and Giuseppe Seimandi and in the mixed team with Irene Franchini.

He won two medals in the European Games in Krakow 2023, one medal in the European Outdoor Archery Championship in 2024 and two medals in the European Indoor Archery Championship, in the years 2024 and 2025.

== Medal table ==
Arco compound
World Archery 3D Championships
Edition	Place	Medal	Event
2022	Terni (Italy)	3rd place, bronze medalist(s)	Individual
2022	Terni (Italy)	1st place, gold medalist(s)	Mixed Team
2022	Terni (Italy)	3rd place, bronze medalist(s)	Team
2024	Mokrice (Slovenia)	1st place, gold medalist(s)	Individual
2024	Mokrice (Slovenia)	1st place, gold medalist(s)	Mixed Team
European Archery 3D Championships
Edition	Place	Medal	Event
2023	Cesana Torinese (Italy)	1st place, gold medalist(s)	Individual
World Field Archery Championships
Edition	Place	Medal	Event
2024	Lac La Biche (Canada)	2nd place, silver medalist(s)	Team
European Archery Field Championships
Edition	Place	Medal	Event
2021	Porec (Croatia)	2nd place, silver medalist(s)	Individual
2021	Porec (Croatia)	1st place, gold medalist(s)	Mixed Team
2021	Porec (Croatia)	2nd place, silver medalist(s)	Team
2023	Cesana Torinese (Italy)	1st place, gold medalist(s)	Individual
2023	Cesana Torinese (Italy)	1st place, gold medalist(s)	Team
Archery at the European Games
Edition	Place	Medal	Event
2023	Cracovia (Poland)	2nd place, silver medalist(s)	Individual
2023	Cracovia (Poland)	3rd place, bronze medalist(s)	Mixed Team
European Archery Championships outdoor
Edition	Place	Medal	Event
2024	Essen (Germany)	1st place, gold medalist(s)	Team
European Archery Championships indoor
Edition	Place	Medal	Event
2024	Varaždin (Croatia)	3rd place, bronze medalist(s)	Team
2025	Samsun (Turkey)	1st place, gold medalist(s)	Team
