= 2024 World Archery 3D Championships =

Archery championship

- Venue: Mokrice Castle
- Location: Mokrice, Slovenia
- Start date: 30 September
- End date: 6 October
- Competitors: 305 from 31 nations

The 2024 World Archery 3D Championships was held at Mokrice Castle, Slovenia from 30 September to 6 October 2024. Only the women's traditional bow final can be watched online, while the complete program is on the official Archery+ platform.

== Medal summary ==
=== Elite events ===
Event	Gold	Silver	Bronze
Men's Events
Barebow Men's individual	Oliver Øchkenholt; Denmark	Simone Barbieri; Italy	Ludvig Rohlin; Sweden
Compound Men's individual	Mikael Anderle; Sweden	Joan Pauner; France	Marco Bruno; Italy
Longbow Men's individual	Ian Edwards; Great Britain	Marco Pontremolesi; Italy	Enzo Lazzaroni; Italy
Traditional Men's individual	Jed Cullen; Great Britain	Tomáš Rožnovský; Czech Republic	Wolfgang Probst; Austria
Men's team	Spain; César Vera Bringas; Jairo Valentín Fernández Álvarez; Bienvenido Moreno Egea; Óscar Amate Cerezo	United States; Archie Nixon; Christian Clark; Shiloh Butts; Aaron Shelnutt	Sweden; Mikael Anderle; Joakim Hed; Brian Pedersen; Jesper Nyström
Women's Events
Barebow Women's individual	Cinzia Noziglia; Italy	Anne Jälkö; Finland	Braccini Rania; Italy
Compound Women's individual	Irene Franchini; Italy	Ingrid Ronacher; Austria	Elisa Baldo; Italy
Longbow Women's individual	Cecilia Santacroce; Italy	Encarna Garrido Lázaro; Spain	Inge Sirkel-Suviste; Estonia
Traditional Women's individual	Sabrina Vannini; Italy	Michela Donati; Italy	Claudia Weinberger; Austria
Women's team	Italy; Sabrina Vannini; Irene Franchini; Iuana Bassi; Cinzia Noziglia	Austria; Ingrid Ronacher; Rosemarie Leitner; Claudia Weinberger; Kristin Thannesberger	United States; Madison Ritter; Katherine Li; Jayme Buchanan; Julie Jones
Mixed Events
Barebow Mixed team	France; David Jackson; Alicia Baumert	Spain; César Vera Bringas; Ana Maria Cano Garcia	Austria; Harald Niederegger; Rosemarie Leitner
Compound Mixed team	Italy; Marco Bruno; Irene Franchini	Finland; Timo Pirppu; Anne Laurila	France; Joan Pauner; Elodie Baret
Longbow Mixed team	Spain; Jairo Valentín Fernández Álvarez; Encarna Garrido Lázaro	Austria; Franz Harg; Kristin Thannesberger	United States; Shiloh Butts; Jayme Buchanan
Traditional Mixed team	Austria; Claudia Weinberger; Reinhard Leixner	United Kingdom; Jed Cullen; Sarah Monteith	Sweden; Brian Pedersen; Helena Österlund

== Medal table ==
* Host nation (Slovenia)

Rank	Nation	Gold	Silver	Bronze	Total
1	Italy	6	3	4	13
2	Spain	2	2	0	4
3	Great Britain	2	1	0	3
4	Austria	1	3	3	7
5	France	1	1	1	3
6	Sweden	1	0	3	4
7	Denmark	1	0	0	1
8	Finland	0	2	0	2
9	United States	0	1	2	3
10	Czech Republic	0	1	0	1
11	Estonia	0	0	1	1
Totals (11 entries)		14	14	14	42
