= Encarna Garrido Lázaro =

Spanish archer (born 1971)

Personal information
- Born: 1971 (age 54–55) Palma de Mallorca, Spain

Sport
- Country: Spain
- Sport: Archery
- Event: Longbow
- Club: Club Arco Ribera - Spanish National Team
Medal record
Women's Archery
Representing Spain
- Updated on 07 January 2029

Encarna Garrido Lázaro (born 1971) is a Spanish athlete who competes in archery, in the Longbow category.

He won four gold, four silver, and two bronze medals at the World Archery 3D Championships. At the European Archery 3D Championships, he won six gold, three silver, and two bronze medals, winning at least one medal in every edition held.

Longbow
World Archery 3D Championships
Year	Place	Medal	Event
2003	Sully-sur-Loire (FRA)	Bronze	Team
2011	Donnersbach (AUT)	Gold	Individual
2011	Donnersbach (AUT)	Silver	Team
2015	Terni (ITA)	Gold	Team
2017	Aviñón (FRA)	Silver	Team
2019	Lac la Biche (CAN)	Silver	Individual
2022	Terni (ITA)	Bronze	Team
2022	Terni (ITA)	Gold	Mixed team
2024	Mokrice (SLO)	Silver	Individual
2024	Mokrice (SLO)	Gold	Mixed team
European Archery 3D Championships
Year	Place	Medal	Event
2008	Punta Umbria (ESP)	Silver	Individual
2010	Sassari (ITA)	Gold	Individual
2012	Trakošćan (CRO)	Gold	Individual
2014	Tallinn (EST)	Gold	Individual
2016	Mokrice (SLO)	Gold	Individual
2018	Gotemburgo (SWE)	Silver	Individual
2021	Maribor (SLO)	Gold	Individual
2023	Cesana Torinese (ITA)	Bronze	Team
2023	Cesana Torinese (ITA)	Bronze	Individual
2023	Cesana Torinese (ITA)	Silver	Mixed team
2025	Divčibare (SRB)	Gold	Mixed team

== Notes ==
NOTE: Content in the edit of 10:35, January 7, 2026 was translated from the existing Italian Wikipedia article at es:Encarna Garrido Lázaro; see its history for attribution.
