= 2023 European Archery 3D Championships =

Archery competition

- Venue: San Sicario Alto
- Location: Cesana, Italy
- Start date: 25 September
- End date: 30 September

The 2023 European Archery 3D Championships took place in Cesana, Italy from 25 to 30 September 2023. These are part of the European Archery Championships organized by World Archery Europe (WAE). Videos of the final day are available online, featuring the individual, team and mixed team medal challenges.

== Medal table ==
* Host nation (Italy)

| Rank | Nation | Gold | Silver | Bronze | Total |
|---|---|---|---|---|---|
| 1 | Italy | 6 | 6 | 3 | 15 |
| 2 | Spain | 3 | 3 | 3 | 9 |
| 3 | Austria | 3 | 2 | 1 | 6 |
| 4 | France | 1 | 2 | 3 | 6 |
| 5 | Great Britain | 1 | 0 | 0 | 1 |
| 6 | Norway | 0 | 1 | 0 | 1 |
| 7 | Czech Republic | 0 | 0 | 2 | 2 |
| 8 | Finland | 0 | 0 | 1 | 1 |
| 8 | Germany | 0 | 0 | 1 | 1 |
| Totals (9 entries) | | 14 | 14 | 14 | 42 |

== Medal summary ==
=== Elite events ===
| Event | Gold | Silver | Bronze |
|---|---|---|---|
Men's Events
| Compound Men's individual | Marco Bruno; Italy | Joan Pauner; France | Jesse Sut; Italy |
| Barebow Men's individual | César Vera Bringas; Spain | David Garcia Fernandez; Spain | Giuseppe Seimandi; Italy |
| Longbow Men's individual | Ian Edwards; Great Britain | Enzo Lazzaroni; Italy | Robin Gardeur; France |
| Traditionalbow Men's individual | Carlos Castellano Fernández; Spain | Klaus Grünsteidl; Austria | Nicola Kos; Italy |
| Men's team | Austria; Klaus Grünsteidl; Franz Harg; Nico Wiener | Norway; Eivind Lie; Per Ivar Pahlm; Lars M Sorlie | Spain; Andres Barroso; Jairo Valentin Fernandez Alvarez; David Garcia Fernandez |
Women's Events
| Compound Women's individual | Ingrid Ronacher; Austria | Irene Franchini; Italy | Julia Boehnke; Germany |
| Barebow Women's individual | Ana Maria Cano Garcia; Spain | Cinzia Noziglia; Italy | Alicia Baumert; France |
| Longbow Women's individual | Giulia Barbaro; Italy | Cecilia Santacroce; Italy | Encarna Garrido Lázaro; Spain |
| Traditionalbow Women's individual | Sabrina Vannini; Italy | Michela Donati; Italy | Jarmila Korabecna; Czech Republic |
| Women's team | Italy; Iuana Bassi; Irene Franchini; Cinzia Noziglia | France; Alicia Baumert; Nathalie Doux; Anais Eymard | Spain; Ana Maria Cano Garcia; Encarna Garrido Lázaro; Letizia Urrestarazu Arina |
Mixed Events
| Compound Mixed team | Austria; Ingrid Ronacher; Nico Wiener | Italy; Irene Franchini; Jesse Sut | France; Anais Eymard; Joan Pauner |
| Barebow Mixed team | France; Alicia Baumert; David Jackson | Spain; Ana Maria Cano Garcia; César Vera Bringas | Austria; Rosemarie Leitner; Peter Getto |
| Longbow Mixed team | Italy; Iuana Bassi; Enzo Lazzaroni | Spain; Encarna Garrido Lázaro; Jairo Valentín Fernández Álvarez | Finland; Paula Virmasalo; Janne Huovinen |
| Traditionalbow Mixed team | Italy; Sabrina Vannini; Fabio Pittaluga | Austria; Claudia Weinberger; Klaus Grünsteidl | Czech Republic; Jarmila Korabecna; Tomas Roznovsky |
