= Ian Edwards (archer) =

British archer (born 1974)

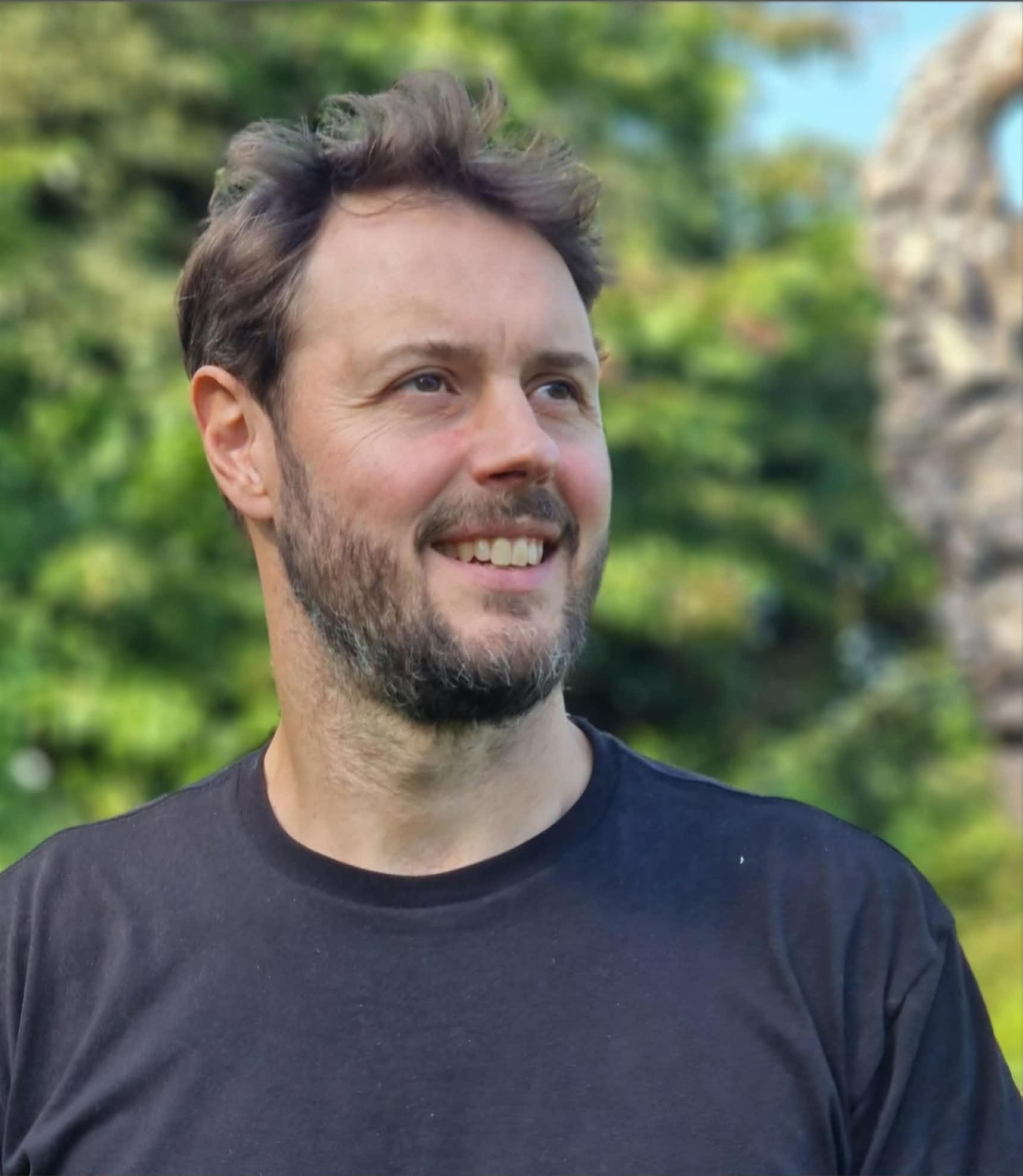
- Ian Edwards in 2025

Personal information
- Born: 1974

Sport
- Country: United Kingdom
- Sport: Archery
- Event: Longbow
- Club: British National Team
Medal record
Men's Archery
Representing United Kingdom
- Updated on 13 January 2026

Ian Edwards (born 1974) is a British archer who competes in longbow archery. Ian Edwards is known for his tunnel vision and incredible mental strength during competitions, skills that have made him one of the British team's go-to mental coaches. In the 3D specialty he won a gold and bronze medal at European level, while at world level he won a gold medal.

He is also a sculptor and he shares how his art sharpened his eye for detail, how archery taught him presence and balance, and why creativity and competition are more connected than most people imagine.

== Medal table ==
Longbow
World Archery 3D Championships
Edition	Place	Medal	Event
2024	Mokrice (Slovenia)	1st place, gold medalist(s)	Individual
European Archery 3D Championships
Edition	Place	Medal	Event
2023	Cesana Torinese (Italy)	1st place, gold medalist(s)	Individual
2025	Divčibare (Serbia)	3rd place, bronze medalist(s)	Team
