= Cecilia Santacroce =

Italian archer (born 1990)

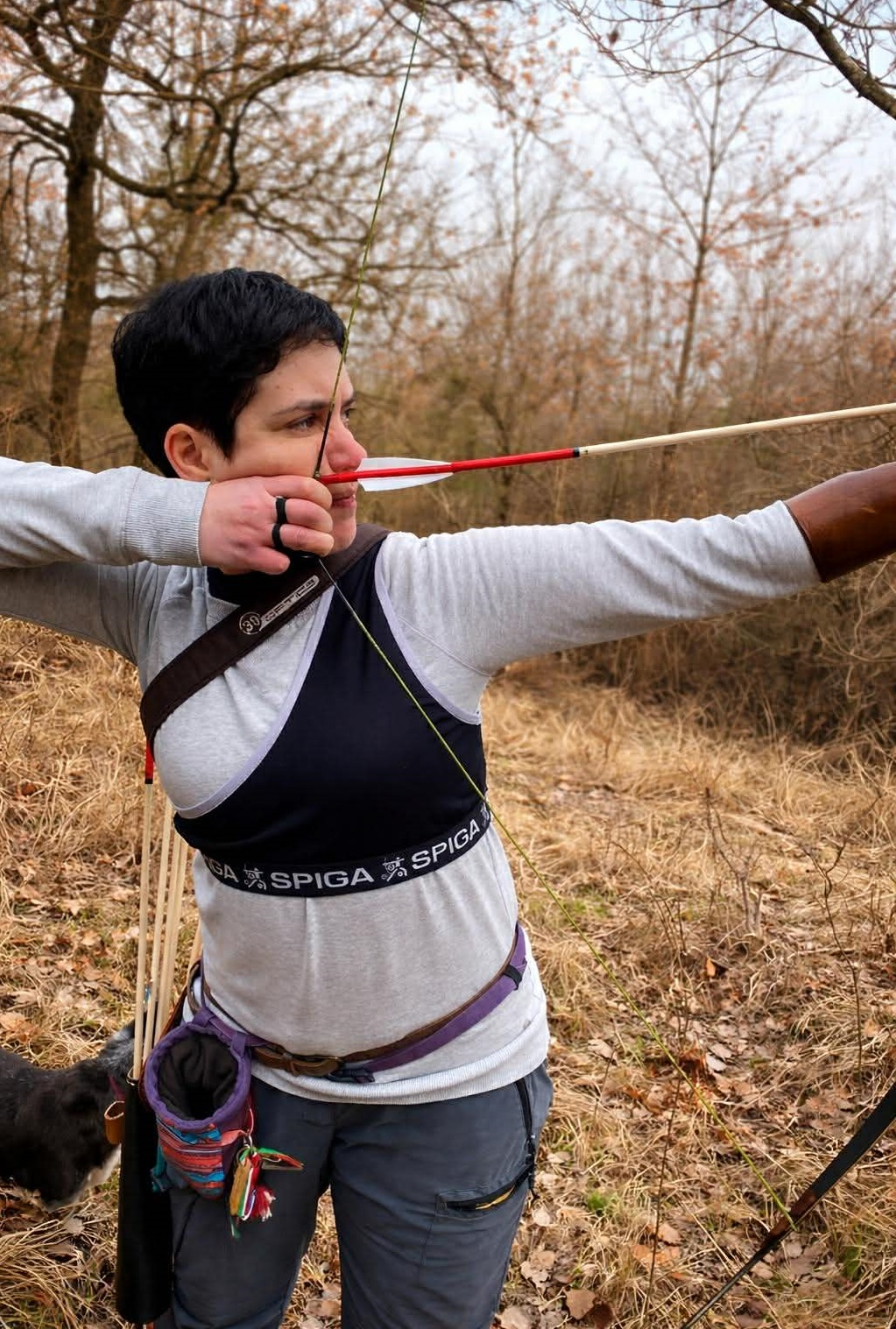

Personal information
- Born: 7 July 1990 (age 36) Parma, Italy

Sport
- Country: Italy
- Sport: Archery
- Event: Longbow
- Club: A.S.D. Ypsilon Arco Club - Italian National Team
Medal record
Women's Archery
Representing Italy
World Archery 3D Championships
Gold medal – first place	2022 Terni (ITA)	Individual
Gold medal – first place	2024 Mokrice (SLO)	Individual
European Archery 3D Championships
Silver medal – second place	2023 Cesana Torinese (ITA)	Individual
Italian Championships FITARCO
Bronze medal – third place	Polino (TR) 2025	individual
Italian Field Archery Championships FIDASC
Gold medal – first place	Castellarano (RE) 2022	individual
Silver medal – second place	Castellarano (RE) 2022	Mixed Team
Silver medal – second place	Castel di Sangro (AQ) 2023	individual
Bronze medal – third place	Castel di Sangro (AQ) 2023	Mixed Team
Silver medal – second place	Schilpario (BG) 2024	individual
Bronze medal – third place	Schilpario (BG) 2024	Mixed Team
- Updated on 06 January 2026

Cecilia Santacroce (Parma, 7 July 1990) is an Italian archer who competes in longbow archery.

== Biography ==
In 2021, she made her debut in regional competitions and in the same year participated in her first FITARCO Italian 3D Championship in Lago Laceno (AV), where she finished fourth overall. In the following years, she devoted herself primarily to the Italian Field Shooting Championships, where in 2022 she won a gold medal on her debut and a silver medal in the mixed team. She returned to compete for the Italian 3D title in 2025 and won the bronze medal.

In 2023 she participated in the European 3D Championships in Cesana Torinese where she won silver in the individual Longbow category.

On her debut in international competitions, at the 2022 World Archery 3D Championships in Terni, she won a gold medal in the individual event and confirmed her success in 2024 in Mokrice, Slovenia.
