= Jed Cullen =

British archer (born 1987)

Personal information
- Born: 1987

Sport
- Country: United Kingdom
- Sport: Archery
- Event: Traditional bow
- Club: British National Team
Medal record
Men's Archery
Representing United Kingdom
- Updated on 13 January 2026

Jed Cullen (born 1987) is a British archer who competes in Traditional Bow archery. Cullen is a firm believer in the "simplicity and power" of the traditional bow. Unlike modern bows (such as compound bows or Olympic recurves), his style doesn't feature complex sights or stabilizers. In the 3D specialty he won a gold medal with Natalie Stones at european level, while at world level he won a gold and Silver medals with Sarah Monteith.

== Medal table ==
Traditional Bow
World Archery 3D Championships
Edition	Place	Medal	Event
2022	Terni (Italia)	2nd place, silver medalist(s)	Individual
2024	Mokrice (Slovenia)	1st place, gold medalist(s)	Individual
2024	Mokrice (Slovenia)	2nd place, silver medalist(s)	Mixed Team
European Archery 3D Championships
Edition	Place	Medal	Event
2025	Divčibare (Serbia)	2nd place, silver medalist(s)	Individual
2025	Divčibare (Serbia)	3rd place, bronze medalist(s)	Team
2025	Divčibare (Serbia)	1st place, gold medalist(s)	Mixed Team
