= Mikael Anderle =

Swedish archer (born 1971)

Personal information
- Born: 25 May 1971 (age 55)

Sport
- Country: Sweden
- Sport: Archery
- Event: Compound bow
- Club: Swedish National Team
Medal record
Men's Archery
Representing Sweden
- Updated on 15 January 2026

Mikael Anderle (born 25 May 1971) is a Swedish archer who competes in compound bow archery.

In the 3D specialty he won a gold medal at the european level in the mixed team with Ida Karlsson, while at the world level he won a gold medal.

== Medal table ==
Arco compound
World Archery 3D Championships
Edition	Place	Medal	Event
2019	Lac La Biche, Alberta (Canada)	3rd place, bronze medalist(s)	Team
2024	Mokrice (Slovenia)	1st place, gold medalist(s)	Individual
2024	Mokrice (Slovenia)	3rd place, bronze medalist(s)	Team
European Archery 3D Championships
Edition	Place	Medal	Event
2021	Maribor (Slovenia)	2nd place, silver medalist(s)	Individual
2021	Maribor (Slovenia)	1st place, gold medalist(s)	Mixed Team
