= Klaus Grünsteidl =

Austrian archer (born 1977)

Personal information
- Born: 1977 (age 48–49) Liebenau (Graz)

Sport
- Country: Austria
- Sport: Archery
- Event: Traditional bow
- Club: BSV Stoneface Archery Unterweißenbach - Austrian National Team
Medal record
Man's Archery
Representing Austria
- Updated on 15 January 2026

Klaus Grünsteidl (born 1977) is an Austrian archer.

== Biography ==
He started practicing it in 2013, starting to compete the following year and joining the Austrian national team in 2017. In 2022 he won two gold medals at the World Archery 3D Championships in Terni in the individual and mixed team with Claudia Weinberger.

== Medal table ==
Traditional bow
World Archery 3D Championships
Edition	Place	Medal	Event
2022	Terni (Italy)	1st place, gold medalist(s)	Individual
2022	Terni (Italy)	1st place, gold medalist(s)	Mixed Team
European Archery 3D Championships
Edition	Place	Medal	Event
2018	Gothenburg (Sweden)	2nd place, silver medalist(s)	Individual
2021	Maribor (Slovenia)	3rd place, bronze medalist(s)	Mixed Team
2023	Cesana Torinese (Italy)	2nd place, silver medalist(s)	Individual
2023	Cesana Torinese (Italy)	2nd place, silver medalist(s)	Mixed Team
2023	Cesana Torinese (Italy)	1st place, gold medalist(s)	Team
