= Field archery at the 2001 World Games – Women's recurve =

Field archery women's recurve at the 2001 World Games
- Venue: Opas Skiing Spot, Akita, Japan
- Dates: 17–19 August 2001
- Competitors: 12 from 8 nations

Medalists
gold medal	(France) Carole Ferriou
silver medal	(Austria) Elisabeth Grube
bronze medal	(France) Laure Barczynski

The women's recurve archery competition at the 2001 World Games took place from 17 to 19 August 2001 at the Opas Skiing Spot in Akita, Japan.

== Competition format ==
A total of 12 archers entered the competition. The best four athletes from preliminary round qualifies to the semifinals.

== Results ==
=== Preliminary round ===
Rank	Archer	Nation	Score	Note
1	Irene Franchini	Italy	627	Q
2	Laure Barczynski	France	626	Q
3	Carole Ferriou	France	625	Q
4	Elisabeth Grube	Austria	608	Q
5	Susanne Lundgren	Sweden	602	
6	Sabine Mayrhofer	Austria	599	
7	Janet Barrs	United States	599	
8	Marina Prelipcean	Belgium	593	
9	Hiroko Umejima	Japan	588	
10	Ingrid Kihlander	Sweden	585	
11	Yuka Iwasaki	Japan	580	
12	Kathryn Faulkner	New Zealand	574	

=== Finals ===
Semifinals
1	(Italy) Irene Franchini	46
4	(Austria) Elisabeth Grube	48
2	(France) Laure Barczynski	42
3	(France) Carole Ferriou	43

Finals
4	(Austria) Elisabeth Grube	46
3	(France) Carole Ferriou	48
Third place
1	(Italy) Irene Franchini	42
2	(France) Laure Barczynski	47
