= 2015 World Archery 3D Championships =

Archery championship

- Location: Terni, Italy
- Start date: 01 September
- End date: 05 September
- Competitors: 249 from 25 nations

The 2015 World Archery 3D Championships took place in terni (Italy), from September 01 to September 05, 2015. Italy, playing at home, was the nation that won the most medals. A summary video of the event is available online.

== Medal summary ==
=== Elite events ===
Games	Gold	Silver	Bronze
Men's Events
Barebow Men's individual	Sebastian Juanola Codina; Spain	Giuseppe Seimandi; Italy	Timo Leskinen; Finland
Compound Men's individual	Nico Wiener; Austria	Mika Rutonen; Finland	Jacob Steffensen; Denmark
Longbow Men's individual	Per Ivar Pahlm; Norway	Marco Pontremolesi; Italy	Jan Elwing; Sweden
Traditional Men's individual	Ferenc Molnar; Hungary	Vitalii Parashchenko; Russia	Fabio Pittaluga; Italy
Men's team	Spain; Joaquin Merida Rodriguez; Jose Luis Iriarte Larumbe; David Garcia Fernandez	Denmark; Jacob Steffensen; Tom Hauberg Rask Nielsen; Torben Cramer Jensen	Austria; Nico Wiener; Christian Wilhelmstaetter; Alois Steinwender
Women's Events
Barebow Women's individual	Cinzia Noziglia; Italy	Stine Asell; Sweden	Luciana Pennacchi; Italy
Compound Women's individual	Anne Lantee; Finland	Lisa Sodersten; Sweden	Michaela Sabitzer; Austria
Longbow Women's individual	Donatella Rizzi; Italy	Giulia Barbaro; Italy	Katrin Virula; Estonia
Traditional Women's individual	Rossella Bertoglio; Italy	Elena Smirnova; Russia	Iuana Bassi; Italy
Women's team	Spain; Elena Rodriguez; Encarna Garrido Lázaro; Begona Perez Garrido	Italy; Irene Franchini; Giulia Barbaro; Cinzia Noziglia	Sweden; Lisa Sodersten; Leena Kaarina Saviluoto; Lina Bjorklund

== Medal table ==
Host country Italy

Pos.	Country	Gold	Silver	Bronze	Tot.
1	Italy	3	4	3	10
2	Spain	3	0	0	3
3	Finland	1	1	1	3
4	Austria	1	0	2	3
5	Hungary	1	0	0	1
5	Norway	1	0	0	1
6	Sweden	0	2	2	4
7	Russia	0	2	0	2
8	Denmark	0	1	1	2
9	Estonia	0	0	1	1
