= 2013 World Archery 3D Championships =

Archery championship

- Location: Sassari, Italy
- Start date: 08 October
- End date: 12 October
- Competitors: 227 from 26 nations

The 2013 World Archery 3D Championships took place in Sassari (Italy), from October 08 to October 12, 2013. Italy, playing at home, was the nation that won the most medals. A summary video of the event is available online.

== Medal summary ==
=== Elite events ===
Games	Gold	Silver	Bronze
Men's Events
Barebow Men's individual	David Garcia Fernandez; Spain	Giuseppe Seimandi; Italy	Richard Kocourek; Czech Republic
Compound Men's individual	Dave Cousins; United States	József Csikós; Denmark	Stig Andersen; Denmark
Longbow Men's individual	Giacomo Luca Fantozzi; Italy	Tomas Hanus; Czech Republic	Marco Pontremolesi; Italy
Traditional Men's individual	Wolfgang Ocenasek; Austria	Alexander Parschisek; Austria	Giuliano Faletti; Italy
Men's team	Denmark; Stig Andersen; Tom Hauberg Rask Nielsen; Claus Larsen	Hungary; Janos Szedlar; Jozsef Molnar; Ferenc Molnar	Spain; Jose Maria Rodriguez; Jose Luis Iriarte Larumbe; David Garcia Fernandez
Women's Events
Barebow Women's individual	Gloria Villa; Italy	Jessica Nilsson; Sweden	Lina Bjorklund; Sweden
Compound Women's individual	Deborah Courpron; France	Sonia Bianchi; Italy	Irene Franchini; Italy
Longbow Women's individual	Sophie Cluze; France	Giulia Barbaro; Italy	Ylle Kell; Estonia
Traditional Women's individual	Christa Ocenasek; Austria	Nina Andrea Standerholen; Norway	Inmaculada Jimenez Garcia; Spain
Women's team	Italy; Sonia Bianchi; Giulia Barbaro; Cinzia Noziglia	France; Deborah Courpron; Sophie Cluze; Chantal Porte	Sweden; Lisa Sodersten; Viola Antman; Jessica Nilsson

== Medal table ==
Host country Italy

Pos.	Country	Gold	Silver	Bronze	Tot.
1	Italy	3	3	3	9
2	France	2	1	0	3
2	Austria	2	1	0	3
3	Denmark	1	1	1	3
4	Spain	1	0	2	3
5	United States	1	0	0	1
6	Sweden	0	1	2	3
7	Czech Republic	0	1	1	2
8	Hungary	0	1	0	1
8	Norway	0	1	0	1
8	Estonia	0	0	1	1
