= 2025 Pan American Field Archery Championships =

- Location: San Cristóbal de las Casas, Mexico
- Dates: 30 September to 6 October 2025

The 2025 Pan American Field Archery Championships took place in San Cristóbal de las Casas, Mexico, from 30 September to 6 October 2025.

== Medal summary ==
=== Recurve ===
Event	Gold	Silver	Bronze
Men's individual	Nicholas D’amour; United States	Marcus D’almeida; Brazil	Jorge Ociel Nevarez; Mexico
Women's individual	Ana Vazquez; Mexico	Evvy Larissa Munoz Garcia; Mexico	Natalia Luna Oyervides Fatima; Mexico

=== Compound ===
Event	Gold	Silver	Bronze
Men's individual	Luis Vives; Mexico	Ruben Eduardo Garcia Aguirre; Mexico	Jonathan Exequiel Ibarra Brizuela; Argentina
Women's individual	Amy Francka; United States	Ivana Palacios Reyes; Mexico	Lea Jarrett; United States
Team	Mexico; Elma Cristina Quiroga; Luis Vives	United States; Amy Francka; Robert Dover	Not awarded

=== Barebow ===
Event	Gold	Silver	Bronze
Men's individual	Allen Knisley; United States	Cristian Duvan Garcia Sanchez; Chile	Johan Gonzalez; Chile
Women's individual	Fawn Girard; United States	Maria Mercedes Criado Toncovich; Argentina	Ana María Moreno Vilicich; Chile
Team	United States; Fawn Girard; Allen Knisley	Chile; Ana María Moreno Vilicich; Cristian Duvan Garcia Sanchez	Mexico; Fabienne Estrada; Manuel Fabian Leal Rodriguez

=== Longbow ===
Event	Gold	Silver	Bronze
Men's individual	Joshua Miller; United States	Javier Morales; Mexico	Facundo Nahuel Rico; Argentina
Women's individual	Verónica Patricia Verdun; Argentina	Joella Bates; United States	Not awarded
Team	United States; Joella Bates; Joshua Miller	Argentina; Verónica Patricia Verdun; Facundo Nahuel Rico	Not awarded

=== Traditional ===
Event	Gold	Silver	Bronze
Men's individual	Cody Hasson; United States	Juan Carlos Rodriguez; Argentina	Jorge Armando Arenas Almaraz; Mexico
Women's individual	Carolina Escalada; Argentina	Claudia Hossfeld; Mexico	Stephanie Correa; United States
Team	United States; Stephanie Correa; Cody Hasson	Argentina; Carolina Escalada; Juan Carlos Rodriguez	Mexico; Claudia Hossfeld; Sergio De La Rocha

== Medal table ==
* Host nation (Mexico)

Rank	Nation	Gold	Silver	Bronze	Total
1	United States	9	2	2	13
2	Mexico*	3	5	5	13
3	Argentina	2	4	2	8
4	Chile	0	2	2	4
5	Brazil	0	1	0	1
Totals (5 entries)		14	14	11	39
