= 2017 World Archery 3D Championships =

Archery championship

- Location: Robion/Avignon, France
- Start date: 19 September
- End date: 24 September
- Competitors: 318 from 30 nations

The 2017 World Archery 3D Championships took place in Robion (France), from September 19 to September 24, 2017. France, playing at home, was the nation that won the most medals.

== Medal summary ==
=== Elite events ===
Games	Gold	Silver	Bronze
Men's Events
Barebow Men's individual	César Vera Bringas; Spain	Fredrik Lundmark; Sweden	Steve Morley; Estonia
Compound Men's individual	Joan Pauner; France	József Csikós; Denmark	Pekka Loitokari; Finland
Longbow Men's individual	Robin Gardeur; France	Mikhail Poddevalin; Russia	Giuliano Faletti; Italy
Traditional Men's individual	Zibrandt Christensen; Denmark	Ferenc Molnar; Hungary	Marjan Kocman; Slovenia
Men's team	United States; Dewayne Martin; Dalton Richardson; Calvin Smock	Spain; Jose Luis Iriarte Larumbe; Jose Maria Rodriguez; César Vera Bringas	France; Robin Gardeur; David Jackson; Joan Pauner
Women's Events
Barebow Women's individual	Jessica Lindblom; Sweden	Kristina Heigenhauser; Germany	Cinzia Noziglia; Italy
Compound Women's individual	Aude Ama; France	Anne Lantee; Finland	Aliz Kun; Hungary
Longbow Women's individual	Giulia Barbaro; Italy	Ylle Kell; Estonia	Paola Sacchetti; Italy
Traditional Women's individual	Heldis Zahlberger; Austria	Marjorie Puech; France	Iuana Bassi; Italy
Women's team	Italy; Irene Franchini; Giulia Barbaro; Cinzia Noziglia	Spain; Encarna Garrido Lázaro; Shenaida Merida Moreno; Rosa Minyano Miquel	Sweden; Leena-Kaarina Saviluoto; Jessica Lindblom; Lisa Sodersten

== Medal table ==
Host country Italy

Pos.	Country	Gold	Silver	Bronze	Tot.
1	France	3	1	1	5
2	Italy	2	0	4	6
2	Spain	1	2	0	3
3	Sweden	1	1	1	3
4	Denmark	1	1	0	2
5	Austria	1	0	0	1
5	United States	1	0	0	1
6	Finland	0	1	1	2
6	Hungary	0	1	1	2
6	Estonia	0	1	1	2
7	Germany	0	1	0	1
7	Russia	0	1	0	1
8	Slovenia	0	0	1	1
