= Jairo Valentín Fernández Álvarez =

Italian archer (born 1971)

Personal information
- Born: 1974 (age 51–52) Gijón, Spain

Sport
- Country: Spain
- Sport: Archery
- Event: Longbow
- Club: Club Arco Ribera - Spanish National Team
Medal record
Women's Archery
Representing Spain
- Updated on 08 January 2029

Jairo Valentín Fernández Álvarez (Gijón, September 10, 1974) is a Spanish athlete who competes in archery, in the longbow modality. He won three gold medals and one silver medal at the World Archery 3D Championships and two silver medals and one bronze medal at the European Archery 3D Championships.

== International Medal Table ==
Longbow
World Archery 3D Championships
Year	Place	Medal	Event
2022	Terni (Italy)	Silver	Team
2022	Terni (Italy)	Gold	Mixed Team
2024	Mokrice (Slovenia)	Gold	Team
2024	Mokrice (Slovenia)	Gold	Mixed Team
European Archery 3D Championships
Year	Place	Medal	Event
2021	Maribor (Slovenia)	Silver	Mixed Team
2023	Cesana Torinese (Italy)	Bronze	Team
2023	Cesana Torinese (Italy)	Silver	Mixed Team

== Notes ==
NOTE: Content in the edit of 17:55, January 8, 2026, was translated from the existing Italian Wikipedia article at es:Jairo Valentín Fernández Álvarez; see its history for attribution.
