= Irene Franchini =

Italian archer (born 1981)

Personal information
- National team: 2000-
- Born: 23 July 1981 (age 44) Castelnovo ne' Monti, Reggio Emilia, Italy

Sport
- Country: Italy
- Sport: Archery
- Event(s): Compound; Recurve
- Club: Fiamme Azzurre
Medal record
Women's compound archery
Representing Italy
World Championships
Bronze medal – third place	2017 Mexico	Mixed Team
World Indoor Championships
Gold medal – first place	2016 Ankara	Individual
Bronze medal – third place	2016 Ankara	Team
World Field Championships
Gold medal – first place	2024 Lac La Biche	Team
World 3D Championships
Bronze medal – third place	2011 Donnersbach	Individual
Bronze medal – third place	2013 Sassari	Individual
Silver medal – second place	2015 Terni	Team
Gold medal – first place	2017 Rabion	Team
Bronze medal – third place	2019 Lac La Biche	Individual
Gold medal – first place	2022 Terni	Mixed team
Gold medal – first place	2024 Mokrice	Individual
Gold medal – first place	2024 Mokrice	Team
Gold medal – first place	2024 Mokrice	Mixed team
European 3D Championships
Gold medal – first place	2008 Punta Umbria	Individual
Silver medal – second place	2008 Punta Umbria	Team
Silver medal – second place	2016 Mokrice	Team
Gold medal – first place	2018 Gothenburg	Individual
Bronze medal – third place	2018 Gothenburg	Team
Gold medal – first place	2021 Maribor	Individual
Silver medal – second place	2021 Maribor	Mixed Team
Gold medal – first place	2021 Maribor	Team
Silver medal – second place	2023 Cesana Torinese	Individual
Gold medal – first place	2023 Cesana Torinese	Team
Silver medal – second place	2023 Cesana Torinese	Mixed Team
Gold medal – first place	2025 Divčibare	Team
Gold medal – first place	2025 Divčibare	Mixed Team
European Championships
Silver medal – second place	2018 Legnica	Team
Bronze medal – third place	2021 Antalya	Team
- Updated on 03 February 2026

Irene Franchini (born 23 July 1981) is an Italian recurve and compound archer and part of the national team.

She competed in the team event and individual event at the 2000 Summer Olympics. She won the gold medal at the 2016 World Indoor Archery Championships in the compound women's individual event and the bronze medal in the compound women's team event. Together with her teammates, Franchini won the bronze medal at the 2021 European Archery Championships in Antalya, Turkey.

In 2024 during the 2024 World Archery 3D Championships in Mokrice Castle (Slovenia) she won gold in the individual Compound Bow category, gold in the women's team together with Sabrina Vannini, Iuana Bassi and Cinzia Noziglia and gold in the mixed team category together with Marco Bruno.
