= Claudia Weinberger =

Austrian archer (born 1979)

Personal information
- Born: 1979 (age 46–47)

Sport
- Country: Austria
- Sport: Archery
- Event: Traditional bow
- Club: TBS Vöcklabruck - Austrian National Team
Medal record
Women's Archery
Representing Austria
- Updated on 15 January 2026

Claudia Weinberger is an Austrian archer (born 1979).

== Biography ==
Weinberger began practicing archery around 2016. In 2022, she won two gold medals at the World Archery 3D Championships in Terni.

== Medal table ==
Traditional bow
World Archery 3D Championships
Edition	Place	Medal	Event
2022	Terni (Italy)	1st place, gold medalist(s)	Individual
2022	Terni (Italy)	1st place, gold medalist(s)	Mixed Team
2024	Mokrice (Slovenia)	3rd place, bronze medalist(s)	Individual
2024	Mokrice (Slovenia)	2nd place, silver medalist(s)	Team
2024	Mokrice (Slovenia)	1st place, gold medalist(s)	Mixed Team
European Archery 3D Championships
Edition	Place	Medal	Event
2023	Cesana Torinese (Italy)	2nd place, silver medalist(s)	Mixed Team
2025	Divčibare (Slovenia)	2nd place, silver medalist(s)	Mixed Team
2025	Divčibare (Slovenia)	2nd place, silver medalist(s)	Team
