= 2022 World Archery 3D Championships =

Archery championship

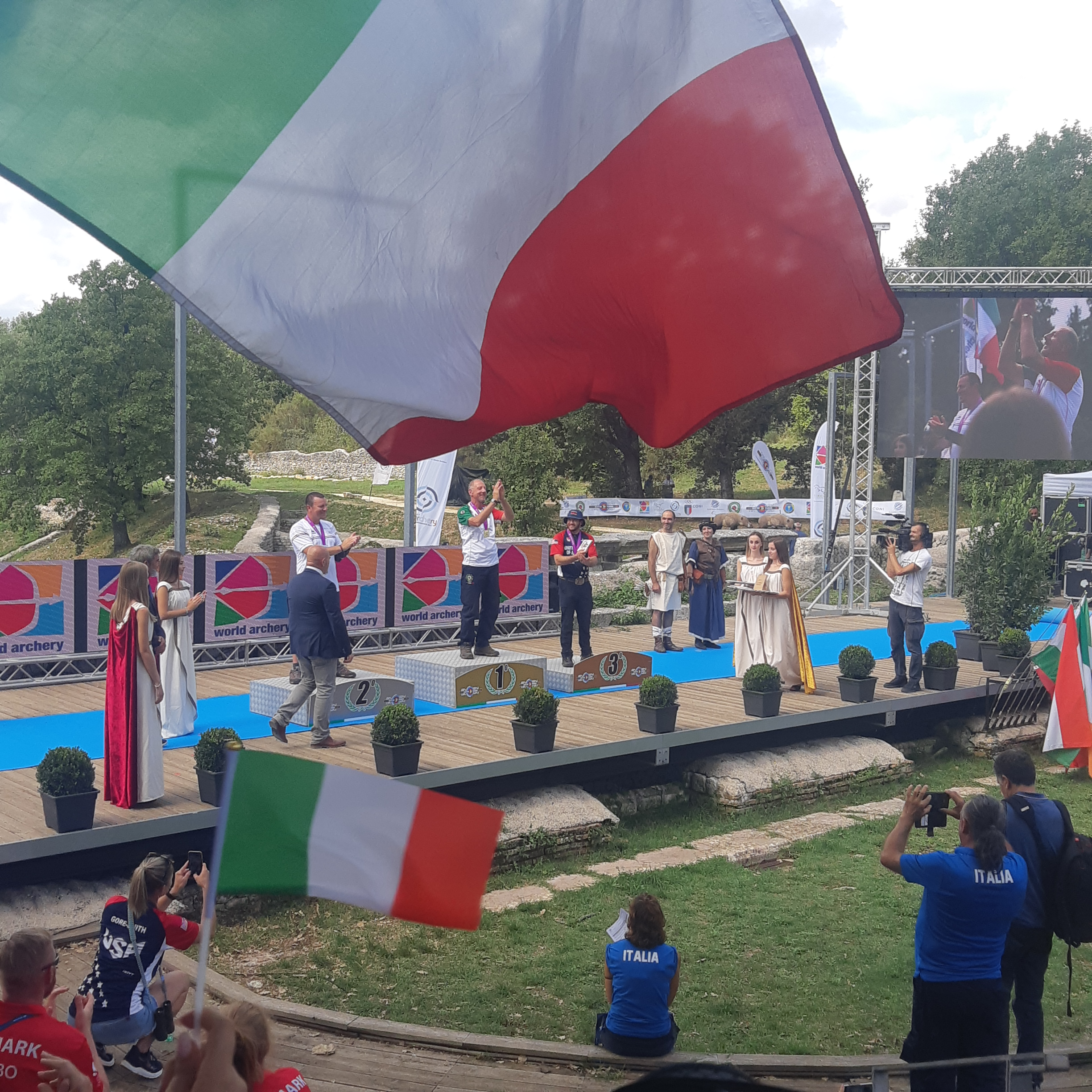
- Terni 2022 Rinehart World Archery 3D Championships
- Location: Terni, Italy
- Start date: 4 September
- End date: 10 September
- Competitors: 320 from 28 nations

The 2022 World Archery 3D Championships was held at Terni, Italy from 04 September to 10 September 2022. The official World Archery video of the finals day is available online.

== Medal summary ==
=== Elite events ===
Event	Gold	Silver	Bronze
Men's Events
Barebow Men's individual	David Jackson; France	William Melnik; Canada	Giuseppe Seimandi; Italy
Compound Men's individual	Nico Wiener; Austria	László Szijártó; Hungary	Marco Bruno; Italy
Longbow Men's individual	Giuliano Faletti; Italy	Guillaume Quetel; France	Butts Shiloh; United States
Traditional Men's individual	Klaus Grünsteidl; Austria	Jed Cullen; Great Britain	Nicola Kos; Italy
Men's team	Italy; Marco Bruno; Giuliano Faletti; Giuseppe Seimandi	Spain; Jairo Valentín Fernández Álvarez; David Garcia Fernandez; Jose Maria Rodriguez	Denmark; Stig Andersen; Zibrandt Christensen; Anders Skjødt
Women's Events
Barebow Women's individual	Cinzia Noziglia; Italy	Rosemarie Leitner; Austria	Susanne Steininger Borbath-Vanko; Austria
Compound Women's individual	Elisa Baldo; Italy	Ida Karlsson; Sweden	Ingrid Ronacher; Austria
Longbow Women's individual	Cecilia Santacroce; Italy	Iuana Bassi; Italy	Martina Noale; Argentina
Traditional Women's individual	Claudia Weinberger; Austria	Sabrina Vannini; Italy	Piroska Gyorgyne Kereszt; Hungary
Women's team	Denmark; Kristina Bejder; Stine Hansen; Kirstine Godskesen Klausen	Sweden; Stine Silver Asell; Ida Karlsson; Leena-Kaarina Saviluoto	Spain; Encarna Garrido Lázaro; Alba María Guerrero Sanchez; Rosa Minyano Miquel
Mixed Events
Barebow Mixed team	Sweden; Stine Asell; Fredrik Lundmark	France; David Jackson; Charlotte Pierce	Italy; Giuseppe Seimandi; Cinzia Noziglia
Compound Mixed team	Italy; Marco Bruno; Irene Franchini	Austria; Nico Wiener; Ingrid Ronacher	France; Mylene Bouteleux; Rémy Albanese
Longbow Mixed team	Spain; Jairo Valentín Fernández Álvarez; Encarna Garrido Lázaro	Italy; Giuliano Faletti; Giulia Barbaro	Austria; Johanna Pitschmann; Alfred Mühlburger
Traditional Mixed team	Austria; Claudia Weinberger; Klaus Grünsteidl	Spain; Montse Vasco Iñigo; Carlos Marco Rubio	Italy; Sabrina Vannini; Fedele Soria

== Medal table ==
* Host nation (Italy)

Rank	Nation	Gold	Silver	Bronze	Total
1	Italy	6	3	5	14
2	Austria	4	2	3	9
3	France	1	2	1	4
3	Spain	1	2	1	4
5	Sweden	1	2	0	3
6	Denmark	1	0	1	2
7	Hungary	0	1	1	2
8	Canada	0	1	0	1
8	Great Britain	0	1	0	1
10	Argentina	0	0	1	1
10	United States	0	0	1	1
Totals (11 entries)		14	14	14	42
