= 2023 Pan American Archery Championships =

- Location: Puerto Iguazú, Argentina
- Dates: 7 to 13 November 2023

The 2023 Pan American Archery Championships took place in Puerto Iguazú, Argentina, from 7 to 13 November 2023.

== Medal summary ==
=== Recurve ===
Event	Gold	Silver	Bronze
Men's individual	Luis Alvarez; Mexico	Nicholas D'Amour; U.S. Virgin Islands	Tomas Tisocco; Argentina
Women's individual	Molly Nugent; United States	Oriana Gabriel Gonzalez Vargas; Argentina	Melissa McAvoy; United States
Mixed team	U.S. Virgin Islands; Anne Abernathy; Nicholas D'Amour	Argentina; Tomas Tisocco; Oriana Gabriel Gonzalez Vargas	United States; Molly Nugent; Martin Holzman

=== Compound ===
Event	Gold	Silver	Bronze
Men's individual	Lucas Mercado Luna; Argentina	Luis Vives; Mexico	Federico Salvetti Lernoud; Argentina
Women's individual	González Sterling Ana Lourdes; Mexico	Lea Jarrett; United States	Cynthia Mitchell; Argentina
Mixed team	Mexico; Luis Vives; González Sterling Ana Lourdes	United States; Lea Jarrett; Eric McNutt	Argentina; Cynthia Mitchell; Lucas Mercado Luna

=== Barebow ===
Event	Gold	Silver	Bronze
Men's individual	Marcus Cooley; United States	Nicolas Lemos; Argentina	Diego Daniel Etcheverry; Argentina
Women's individual	Fawn Girard; United States	Carcacha Claudia Noemí; Argentina	Allison Eaton; United States
Mixed team	United States; Fawn Girard; Marcus Cooley	Argentina; Diego Daniel Etcheverry; Carcacha Claudia Noemí	Mexico; Manuel Leal; Fabienne Estrada

=== Team ===
Event	Gold	Silver	Bronze
Men	Mexico; Luis Vives; Manuel Leal; Luis Alvarez	Argentina; Tomas Tisocco; Lucas Mercado Luna; Diego Daniel Etcheverry	United States; Marcus Cooley; Martin Holzman; Michael King
Women	Argentina; Cynthia Mitchell; Oriana Gabriel Gonzalez Vargas; Carcacha Claudia Noemí	United States; Fawn Girard; Molly Nugent; Lea Jarrett	Mexico; Fabienne Estrada; Landeros Ana; González Sterling Ana Lourdes

== Medal table ==
* Host nation (Argentina)

Rank	Nation	Gold	Silver	Bronze	Total
1	United States	4	3	4	11
2	Mexico	4	1	2	7
3	Argentina*	2	6	5	13
4	U.S. Virgin Islands	1	1	0	2
Totals (4 entries)		11	11	11	33
