= Nico Wiener =

Austrian archer (born 1997)

Personal information
- Born: 15 March 1997 (age 29)

Sport
- Country: Austria
- Sport: Archery
- Event: Compound
Medal record
Men's compound archery
Representing Austria
World Championships
Gold medal – first place	2021 Yankton	Individual
Bronze medal – third place	2021 Yankton	Team
World Field Championships
Silver medal – second place	2022 Yankton	Individual
European Championships
Bronze medal – third place	2022 Munich	Team
World 3D Championships
Gold medal – first place	2015 Terni	Individual
Bronze medal – third place	2015 Terni	Team
Bronze medal – third place	2019 Lac La Biche	Individual
Gold medal – first place	2022 Terni	Individual
Silver medal – second place	2022 Terni	Mixed team
European 3D Championships
Gold medal – first place	2016 Mokrice	Individual
Gold medal – first place	2021 Maribor	Individual
Gold medal – first place	2021 Maribor	Team
Gold medal – first place	2023 Cesana Torinese	Mixed Team

Nico Wiener (born 15 March 1997) is an Austrian archer competing in compound events. He won the gold medal in the men's individual compound event at the 2021 World Archery Championships held in Yankton, United States. He also won the bronze medal in the men's team compound event.

In 2015, Wiener competed in the men's individual compound and men's team compound events at the World Archery Championships held in Copenhagen, Denmark.

Wiener won the bronze medal in the men's team compound event at the 2022 European Archery Championships held in Munich, Germany.

He represented Austria at the 2022 World Games held in Birmingham, United States. He competed in the men's individual compound event.

In the World Archery 3D Championships in Terni in 2015 he won gold in the individual event and will confirm this in 2022. At the European Championships he won gold in the 2016 and 2021 editions.
