= 2022 World Field Archery Championships =

International archery competition

- Location: Yankton, United States
- Start date: 3 October
- End date: 9 October

The 2022 World Field Archery Championships were held at Lewis and Clark Lake Field Range and NFAA Easton Yankton Archery Center, Yankton, United States.

== Medal summary ==
=== Elite events ===
Event	Gold	Silver	Bronze
Men's Events
Compound Men's individual	(United States) Dave Cousins	(Austria) Nico Wiener	(Sweden) Alexander Kullberg
Recurve Men's individual	(Germany) Florian Unruh	(United States) Matthew Nofel	(United Kingdom) Patrick Huston
Barebow Men's individual	(France) David Jackson	(Italy) Eric Esposito	(Sweden) Martin Ottosson
Men's team	Sweden (SWE); Kaj Sjöberg; Jacob Benschjöld; Martin Ottosson	Slovenia (SLO); Stas Modic; Žiga Ravnikar; Klemen Kelvisar	United States (USA); Dave Cousins; Brady Ellison; Matt Yacca
Women's Events
Compound Women's individual	(United States) Paige Pearce	(Slovenia) Toja Ellison	(Germany) Julia Böhnke
Recurve Women's individual	(Italy) Chiara Rebagliati	(United Kingdom) Bryony Pitman	(France) Aurélie Autret
Barebow Women's individual	(Italy) Cinzia Noziglia	(France) Christine Gauthe	(Japan) Megumi Masaki
Women's team	Italy (ITA); Chiara Rebagliati; Cinzia Noziglia; Sara Ret	Spain (ESP); Maria Pitarch; Ana Maria Cano; Alexa Misis Olivares	Germany (GER); Bianca Speicher; Martina Boscher; Julia Böhnke
Mixed Events
Compound Mixed team	United States (USA); Dave Cousins; Paige Pearce	Germany (GER); Henning Lüpkemann; Julia Böhnke	Croatia (CRO); Amanda Mlinaric; Domagoj Buden
Recurve Mixed team	Italy (ITA); Marco Morello; Chiara Rebagliati	France (FRA); Florent Mulot; Aurélie Autret	United States (USA); Brady Ellison; Savannah Vanderwier
Barebow Mixed team	Sweden (SWE); Erik Jonsson; Lina Björklund	Italy (ITA); Eric Esposito; Cinzia Noziglia	France (FRA); David Jackson; Christine Gauthe

=== Junior events ===
Event	Gold	Silver	Bronze
Men's junior events
Compound Men's individual	(Canada) Dustin Watson	(Slovenia) Tim Jevsnik	(Slovenia) Aljaz Matija Brenk
Recurve Men's individual	(Spain) Francho Rufas Morillo	(Czech Republic) Richard Krejčí	(France) Antoine Balanant
Barebow Men's individual	(Romania) Adrian Vlase	(United States) Max Rossiter	Not awarded
Men's team	Romania (ROU); Rares Daniel Alexandrescu; Adrian Vlase; Mario Timpu	United States (USA); Ryan Booth; Davis Beauvais; Max Rossiter	Not awarded
Women's junior events
Compound Women's individual	(United States) Lilie Aguilar	(Romania) Andreea Albu	(Norway) Ylva Hjelle
Recurve Women's individual	(Italy) Aiko Rolando	(Italy) Roberta Di Francesco	(United Kingdom) Louisa Piper
Barebow Women's individual	(United States) Rubie Chambers	(Romania) Elena Topliceanu	(Spain) Aitana Gracia Ardoiz
Women's team	Romania (ROU); Beatrice Miklos; Elena Topliceanu; Andreea Albu	United States (USA); Rubie Chambers; Lilie Aguilar; Abigail Kippes	Not awarded
Mixed Events
Compound Mixed team	Romania (ROU); Rares Daniel Alexandrescu; Andreea Albu	United States (USA); Ryan Booth; Lilie Aguilar	Canada (CAN); Dustin Watson; Tasja Boyle
Recurve Mixed team	France (FRA); Antoine Balanant; Audrey Machinet	Italy (ITA); Aiko Rolando; Matteo Borsani	Romania (ROU); Beatrice Miklos; Mario Timpu
Barebow Mixed team	Romania (ROU); Elena Topliceanu; Adrian Vlase	United States (USA); Rubie Chambers; Max Rossiter	Not awarded

== Medal table ==
Rank	Nation	Gold	Silver	Bronze	Total
1	United States	5	6	2	13
2	Italy	5	4	0	9
3	Romania	5	2	1	8
4	France	2	2	3	7
5	Sweden	2	0	2	4
6	Germany	1	1	2	4
7	Spain	1	1	1	3
8	Canada	1	0	1	2
9	Slovenia	0	3	1	4
10	Great Britain	0	1	2	3
11	Austria	0	1	0	1
11	Czech Republic	0	1	0	1
13	Croatia	0	0	1	1
13	Japan	0	0	1	1
13	Norway	0	0	1	1
Totals (15 entries)		22	22	18	62
