= Luis Rossi =

Luis Rossi is an internationally renowned clarinetist. He performed as Principal clarinetist in symphony orchestras throughout South America for twenty years before he founded a clarinet workshop in Santiago, Chile, in 1986. Since then he has also focused on his work as a soloist and has offered master classes at institutions such as Indiana University (Bloomington, USA), Michigan State University (Lansing, USA), Ohio State University (Columbus, USA), Royal College of Music (London, England), the International Clarinet and Saxophone Connection at the New England Conservatory of Music (2002) and the Belgian Clarinet Academy (Ostend Conservatory). He has recorded four compact discs using Rossi Rosewood and African Blackwood clarinets.

The professional Rossi clarinet is widely used by performers internationally. Over a 20-year career in instrument making, Rossi has worked as a clarinet designer and has contributed to research in clarinet acoustics. He has also taught clarinetists including Carlos Céspedes and Alejandro Martín Cancelos.

In 2005, Luis Rossi partnered with the Brazilian factory Weril Instrumentos Musicais and the Gemstone Musical Instruments to create Andino Clarinets, a student-level version of his professional instruments.
