= Yankton =

Yankton may refer to:

== People ==
- Yankton Dakota, division of the Dakota people, sometimes referred to as Yankton

== Places ==
- Yankton County, South Dakota
  - Yankton, South Dakota
- Yankton, Oregon

== Other ==
- Lake Yankton, a lake in Minnesota
- Yankton College, a small liberal arts college in Yankton, South Dakota
- Federal Prison Camp, Yankton, a prison in Yankton, South Dakota
