= 2024 World Field Archery Championships =

Archery competition

- Venue: Lakeland Archery Centre
- Location: Lac La Biche, Canada
- Start date: 16 September
- End date: 22 September

The 2024 World Field Archery Championships was the 28th edition of the World Field Archery Championships and were held in Lac La Biche, Canada from 16 to 22 September 2024.

== Medal summary ==
=== Elite events ===
Event	Gold	Silver	Bronze
Men's Events
Compound Men's individual	Mike Schloesser; Netherlands	Florian Stadler; Germany	Roberto Carosati; Italy
Recurve Men's individual	Brady Ellison; United States	Ryan Tyack; Australia	Matthew Nofel; United States
Barebow Men's individual	Cesar Vera Bringas; Spain	Erik Jonsson; Sweden	Giuseppe Seimandi; Italy
Men's team	Slovenia; Žiga Ravnikar; Staš Modic; Klemen Kelvišar	Italy; Massimiliano Mandia; Marco Bruno; Giuseppe Seimandi	Canada; Brian Maxwell; Andrew Fagan; Jovica Djukic
Women's Events
Compound Women's individual	Paige Pearce; United States	Amanda Mlinarić; Croatia	Ella Gibson; Great Britain
Recurve Women's individual	Roberta Di Francesco; Italy	Gaby Schloesser; Netherlands	Chiara Rebagliati; Italy
Barebow Women's individual	Fawn Girard; United States	Claudia Noemí Carcacha; Argentina	Livia Fabris; Italy
Women's team	Italy; Roberta Di Francesco; Irene Franchini; Cinzia Noziglia	United States; Alex Zuleta-Visser; Paige Pearce; Fawn Girard	Germany; Elisa Tartler; Alexandra Stadler; Christine Schaefer
Mixed Events
Compound Mixed team	Slovenia; Toja Ellison; Staš Modic	United States; Paige Pearce; Eli Hughes	United Kingdom; Ella Gibson; Jake Walsh
Recurve Mixed team	Italy; Roberta Di Francesco; Massimiliano Mandia	Australia; Alexandra Feeney; Ryan Tyack	Slovenia; Urška Čavič; Žiga Ravnikar
Barebow Mixed team	Italy; Cinzia Noziglia; Giuseppe Seimandi	United States; Fawn Girard; Ryan Davis	Germany; Christine Schaefer; Michael Meyer

=== Under-21 events ===
Event	Gold	Silver	Bronze
Men's under-21 events
Compound Men's individual	Dewey Hathaway; United States	Fabrizio Aloisi; Italy	Stef Willems; Netherlands
Recurve Men's individual	Nectarios Condurache; Romania	Daniel Medveczky; Slovakia	Christopher Jackson; Australia
Barebow Men's individual	Ludvig Rohlin; Sweden	Oliver Hicks; Great Britain	Hugo Lobb; Australia
Men's team	Australia; Christopher Jackson; Alban Thornycroft; Hugo Lobb	Czech Republic; Richard Krejčí; Immer Lukas; Ladislav Neblecha	Romania; Nectarios Condurache; Rareș Daniel Alexandrescu; Baican Ciprian
Women's under-21 events
Compound Women's individual	Jaqueline Ringström; Sweden	Giulia Di Nardo; Italy	Rendyn Brooks; United States
Recurve Women's individual	Lucia Mosna; Italy	Amelia Gagne; Canada	Hailey Franzone; United States
Barebow Women's individual	Barbara Feltre; Italy	Jaelyn Coleman; United States	Tessa Hogan; United States
Mixed Events
Compound Mixed team	United States; Rendyn Brooks; Dewey Hathaway	Italy; Giulia Di Nardo; Fabrizio Aloisi	Canada; Anya Pinel; Dustin Watson
Recurve Mixed team	Czech Republic; Tereza Veverková; Richard Krejčí	Italy; Lucia Mosna; Simone Dezani	United States; Hailey Franzone; Ashton Probus

== Medal table ==
* Host nation (Canada)

Rank	Nation	Gold	Silver	Bronze	Total
1	Italy	6	5	4	15
2	United States	5	4	5	14
3	Sweden	2	1	0	3
4	Slovenia	2	0	1	3
5	Australia	1	2	2	5
6	Netherlands	1	1	1	3
7	Czech Republic	1	1	0	2
8	Romania	1	0	1	2
9	Spain	1	0	0	1
10	Canada	0	1	2	3
10	Germany	0	1	2	3
10	Great Britain	0	1	2	3
13	Argentina	0	1	0	1
13	Croatia	0	1	0	1
13	Slovakia	0	1	0	1
Totals (15 entries)		20	20	20	60
