= World Archery Europe =

- Abbreviation: WAE (formerly EMAU)
- Formation: 1988; 38 years ago
- Type: Sports organisation
- Headquarters: Lausanne, Switzerland
- Region served: Europe
- Members: 51
- President: Hakan Çakıroğlu
- General Secretary: Alessandra Colasante
- Parent organization: World Archery
- Website: www.archeryeurope.org

The World Archery Europe (WAE, also and formerly known as EMAU from European and Mediterranean Archery Union) is an archery organization headquartered in Rome, Italy. It is an official governing body which provides news, calendar, history, rules, competition results, and information about member organizations. WAE is a member of World Archery since its inception in 1988. In response to the 2022 Russian invasion of Ukraine, World Archery Europe decided to not permit any athlete, team official, or technical official from Russia or Belarus to participate in any international archery event.
