= Robion =

- Commune
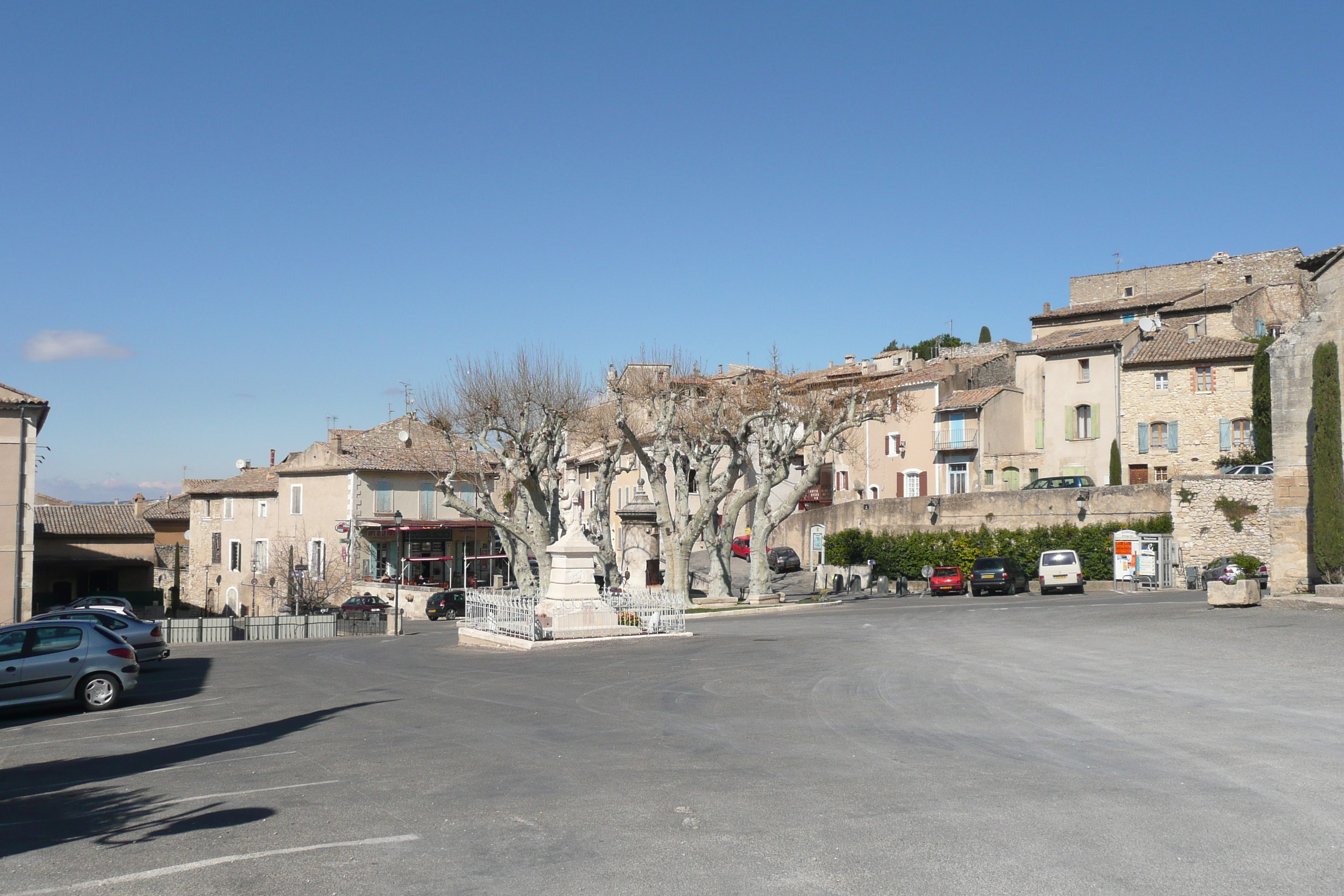
- Robion's square

- Coat of arms
- Location of Robion
- Location within France Location within Provence-Alpes-Côte d'Azur
- Coordinates: 43°50′42″N 5°06′48″E
- Country: France
- Region: Provence-Alpes-Côte d'Azur
- Department: Vaucluse
- Arrondissement: Apt
- Canton: Cheval-Blanc
- Intercommunality: CA Luberon Monts de Vaucluse

Government
  - Mayor (2020–2026): Patrick Sintès
- Area^{1}: 17.07 km^{2} (6.59 sq mi)
- Population (2023): 4,816
  - Density: 282.1/km^{2} (730.7/sq mi)
- Time zone: UTC+01:00 (CET)
  - Summer (DST): UTC+02:00 (CEST)
- INSEE/Postal code: 84099 /84440
- Website: https://www.robion.fr
- ^{1} French Land Register data, which excludes lakes, ponds, glaciers > 1 km^{2} (0.386 sq mi or 247 acres) and river estuaries.

Robion (French pronunciation: [ʁɔbjɔ̃]) is a commune in the Vaucluse department in the Provence-Alpes-Côte d'Azur region in southeastern France. The new part of the village runs along the D2 road, and the old part of the village is clustered at the foot of the Luberon mountain.

== Geography ==
The Calavon, locally called Coulon, flows westward through the middle of the commune.

== Population ==
Historical population
Year	Pop.	±% p.a.
1968	2,059	—
1975	2,431	+2.40%
1982	3,197	+3.99%
1990	3,417	+0.84%
1999	3,844	+1.32%
2007	3,982	+0.44%
2012	4,129	+0.73%
2017	4,531	+1.88%
2023	4,816	+1.02%
Source: INSEE

== See also ==
- Côtes du Luberon AOC
- Communes of the Vaucluse department
- Luberon
