= Lac La Biche (Alberta) =

Lake in Alberta, Canada

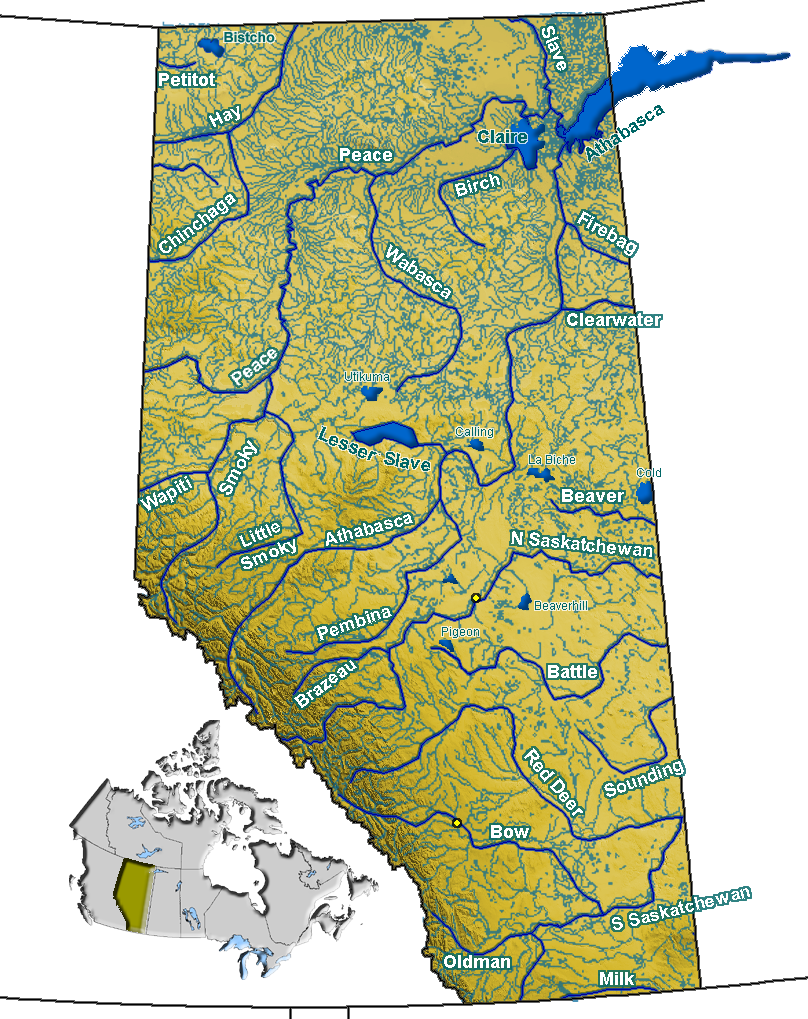
- Lac La Biche in Alberta

- Location within Alberta
- Location: Lac La Biche County, Alberta
- Coordinates: 54°51′23″N 112°03′32″W
- Primary inflows: Owl River
- Primary outflows: La Biche River
- Basin countries: Canada
- Max. length: 20.7 km (12.9 mi)
- Max. width: 29.3 km (18.2 mi)
- Surface area: 234 km^{2} (90 sq mi)
- Average depth: 8.4 m (28 ft)
- Max. depth: 21.3 m (70 ft)
- Surface elevation: 544 m (1,785 ft)
- Settlements: Lac La Biche, Plamondon, Barnegat, Owl River

Lac La Biche (/ˌlæk lə ˈbɪʃ/ LAK lə BISH) is a large lake in north-central Alberta, Canada. It is located along the Northern Woods and Water Route, 95 km east of Athabasca. Lac La Biche has a total area of 236 km^{2} (91 sq mi), including 3.2 km^{2} (1.2 sq mi) islands area.

== Etymology ==
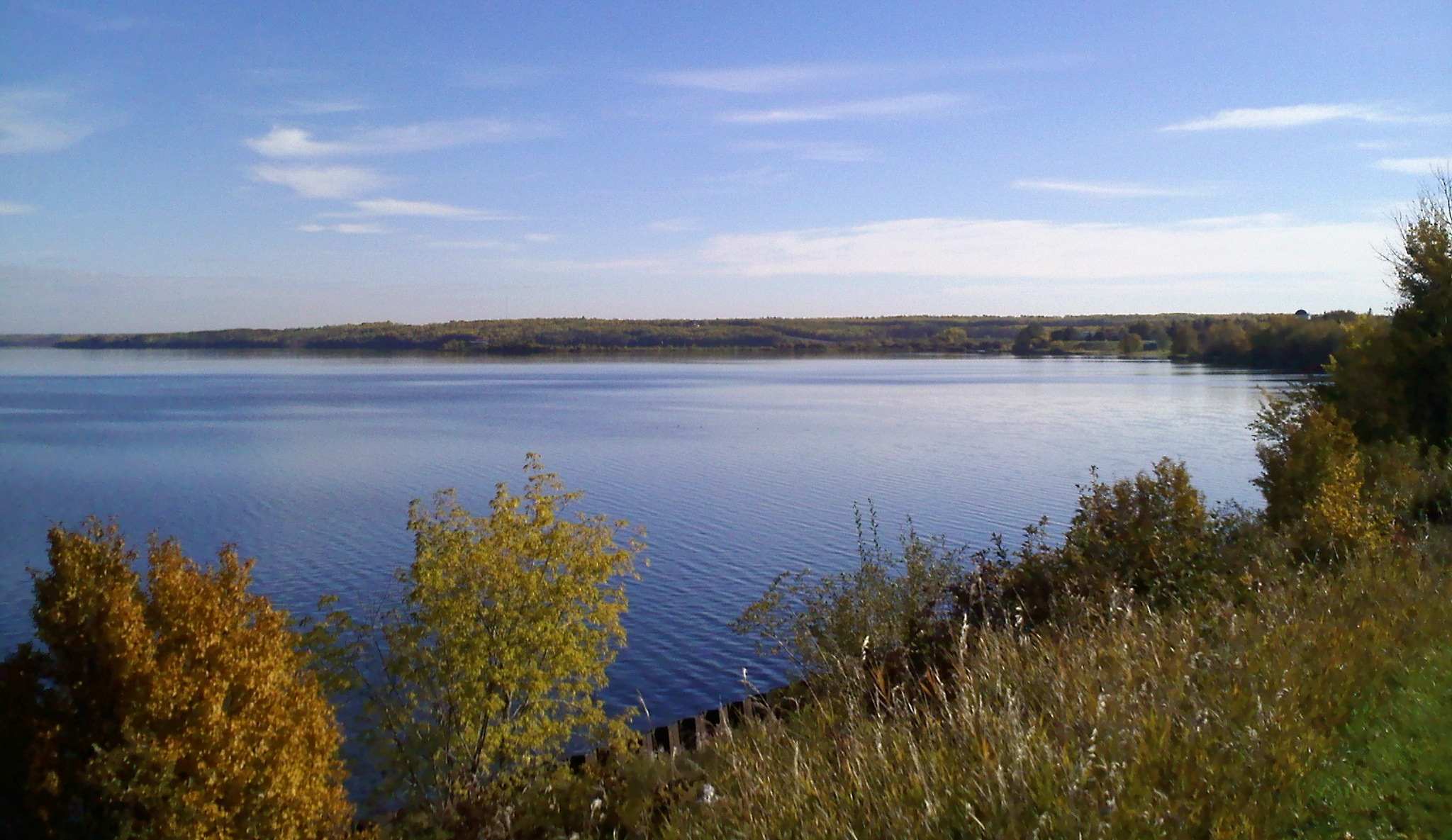
The southern shore seen from Lac La Biche.

The indigenous peoples of the area refer to the lake as Elk Lake (Cree: wâwâskesiwisâkahikan, Chipewyan: tzalith tway). Since the lake shares its name with the town, locals often use the redundant name "Lac La Biche Lake". La biche in French means 'the doe', as in female deer.

== Hydrography ==
Owl River flows into the lake, and its waters are drained through the La Biche River and into the Athabasca River, placing it in the basin that flows to the Arctic Ocean. Just to the south is Beaver Lake which drains into Hudson Bay.

== Settlements ==
The former town and population centre of Lac La Biche is on the southern shore of the lake. The communities of Plamondon, Barnegat and Owl River are also located around Lac La Biche.

== Recreation ==
Sir Winston Churchill Provincial Park is on an island of the lake.
