= Barebow =

Type of bow used in archery

The barebow is a sporting tool used in archery. This type of bow is very similar to the recurve bow, but lacks accessories such as a sight, stabilizers, and clicker.

== Components and accessories ==
The barebow is therefore composed only of:

- Riser
- Limbs
- String
- Button (Berger button)
- Weights (instead of the stabilizer to prevent the bow from tilting upward after release).

== Shooting technique ==
Unlike the recurve bow, which is equipped with a sight and other accessories, barebow technique is less technologically advanced and more dependent on the archer's skill, so there's no single solution. Indeed, over time, archers hone their technique individually, given that not all athletes have the same skeletal and muscular structure. However, there are some basic rules that instructors teach to novice archers. First, barebow aiming is done through the arrowhead (since the instrument doesn't have a sight), which can be aimed at the center of the target or at a different reference point (this technique is called counter-aiming, and is unique to barebow archery). The string is held using the string-walking technique, used only for this category. Every time an archer shoots an arrow at a given distance, he or she must mentally calculate the distance and adjust the grip point accordingly. The higher the grip is on the string (up to the point where the arrow is nocked), the higher the trajectory the arrow will take. Therefore, to reach greater distances, if the grip is lower, the arrow will assume a more oblique position, ideal for close-range shots. Another technique used by archers to vary distances is face walking, where the string is always gripped at the same height, but the point on the face where the anchor is made varies. In archery, the anchor is the point where the string is brought to the face; in barebow, it is done by bringing the index finger until it touches the corner of the mouth (according to basic teachings).

== Accessible races ==
The barebow can be used in indoor competitions at a distance of 18 meters; the target face for all classes except for the very young is 40 cm in diameter; there are competitions where you can shoot at a distance of 25 meters with a target face of 60 cm in diameter. Outdoors, however, this bow can be used in 3D archery competitions and Hunter & Field competitions in the woods in situations that simulate hunting activity.

== Related entries ==
- Recurve bow
- Archery
