= Mokrice Castle =

Castle near Brežice, Slovenia

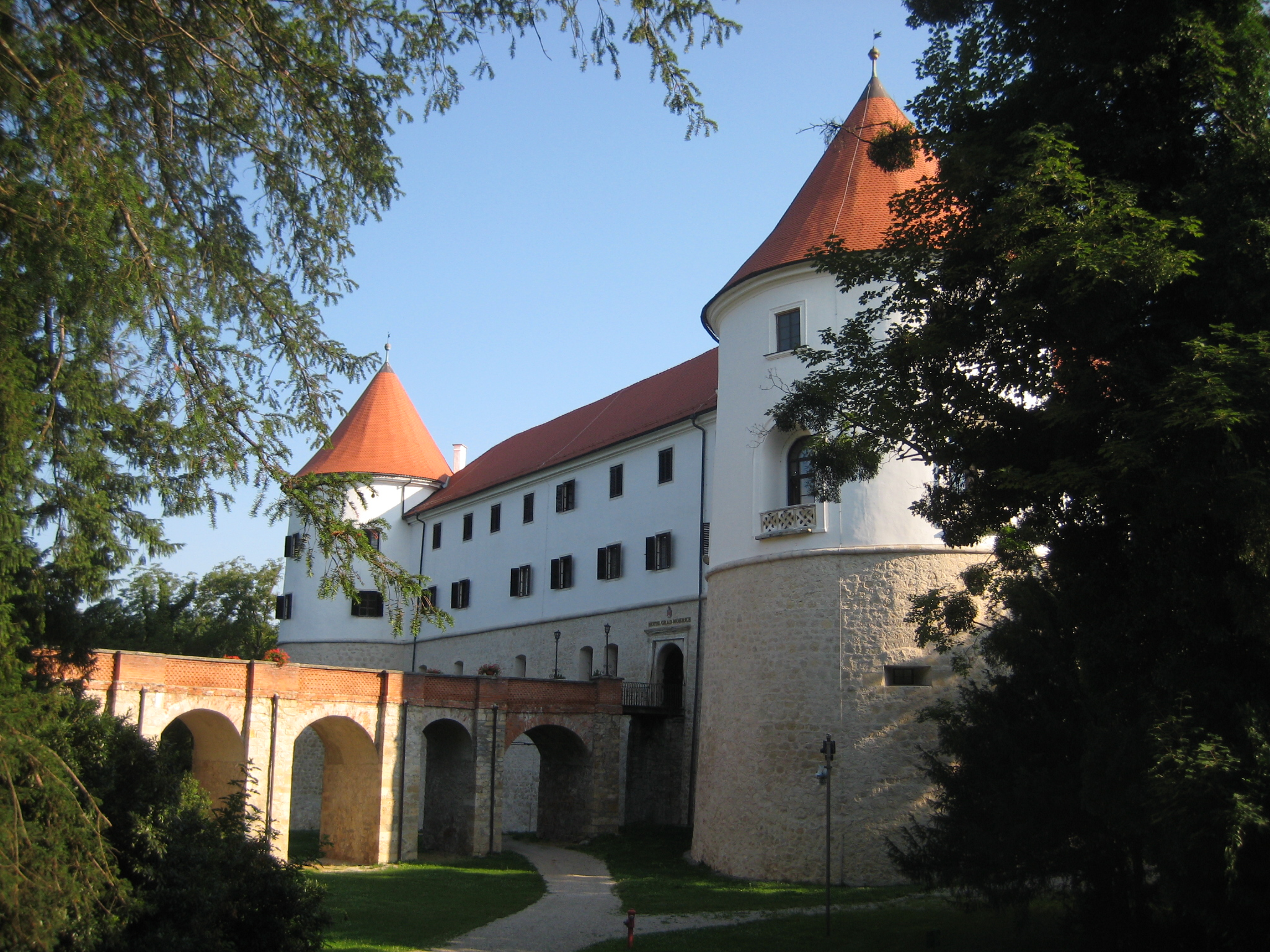

- Location in Slovenia

General information
- Coordinates: 45.858442°N 15.675715°E
- Operator: Terme Čatež

Mokrice Castle (pronounced [mɔˈkɾiːtsɛ]; Slovene: grad Mokrice, German: Mokritz) is a medieval castle southeast of Brežice, Slovenia, located on a hill in the northern part of the settlement of Rajec in the Gorjanci Hills, near the Croatian border.

== History ==
First mentioned in 1444, the castle was rebuilt in the 16th century and in 1941. The castle belonged to many noble families, the most important being the Erdődy and Auersperg families. After World War II, it was made into a hotel with restaurants, and in 1988 a golf course was built in the grounds of the castle. The 18-hole golf course is over 66 hectares in size.

== Trivia ==
It was the setting for the 1985 movie "Transylvania 6-5000". Additionally, in 1988, the English pop band the Pet Shop Boys used this castle to film the video for their single "Heart," which also featured the English actor Ian McKellen.

== Gallery ==
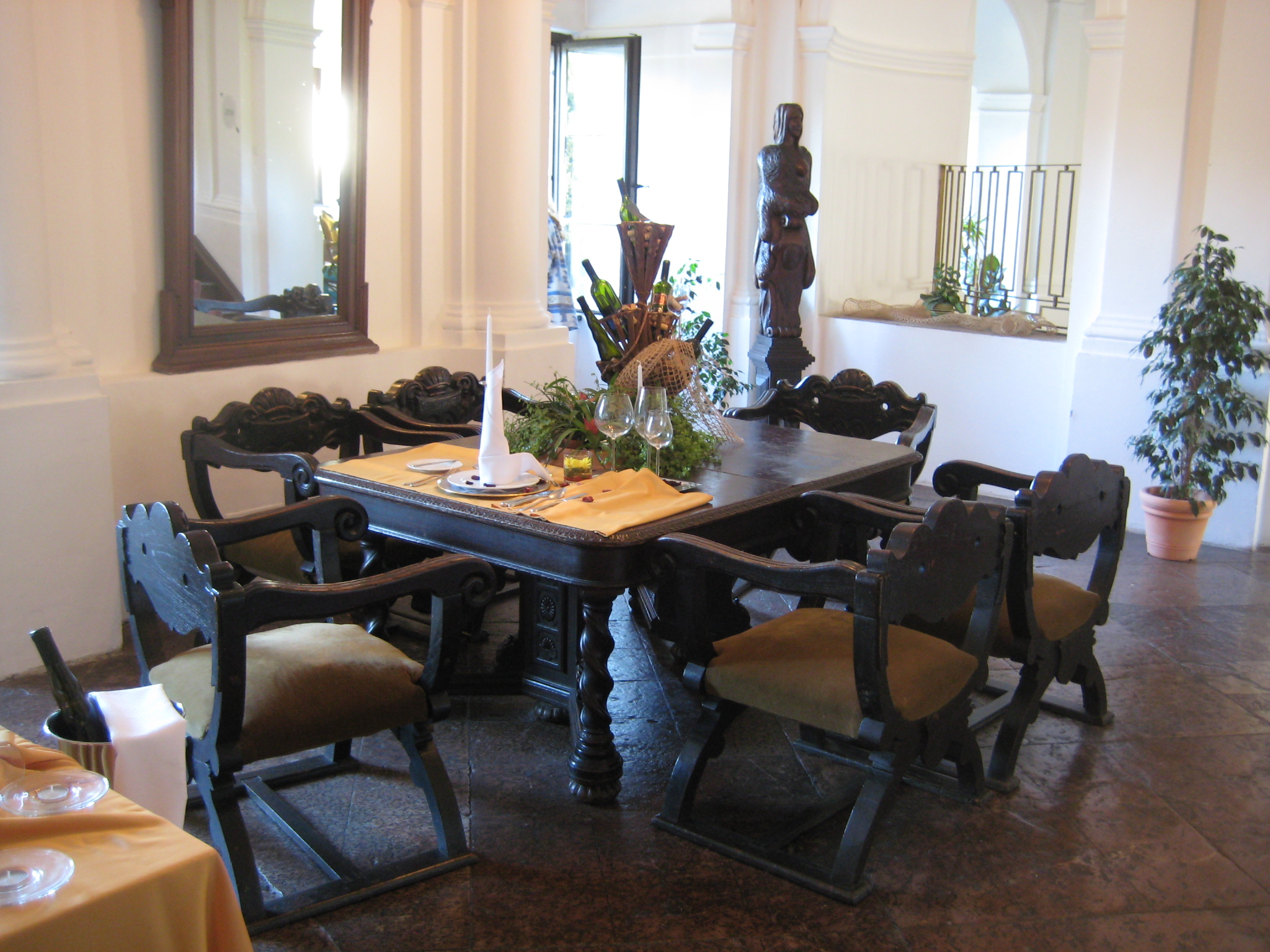
The interior.

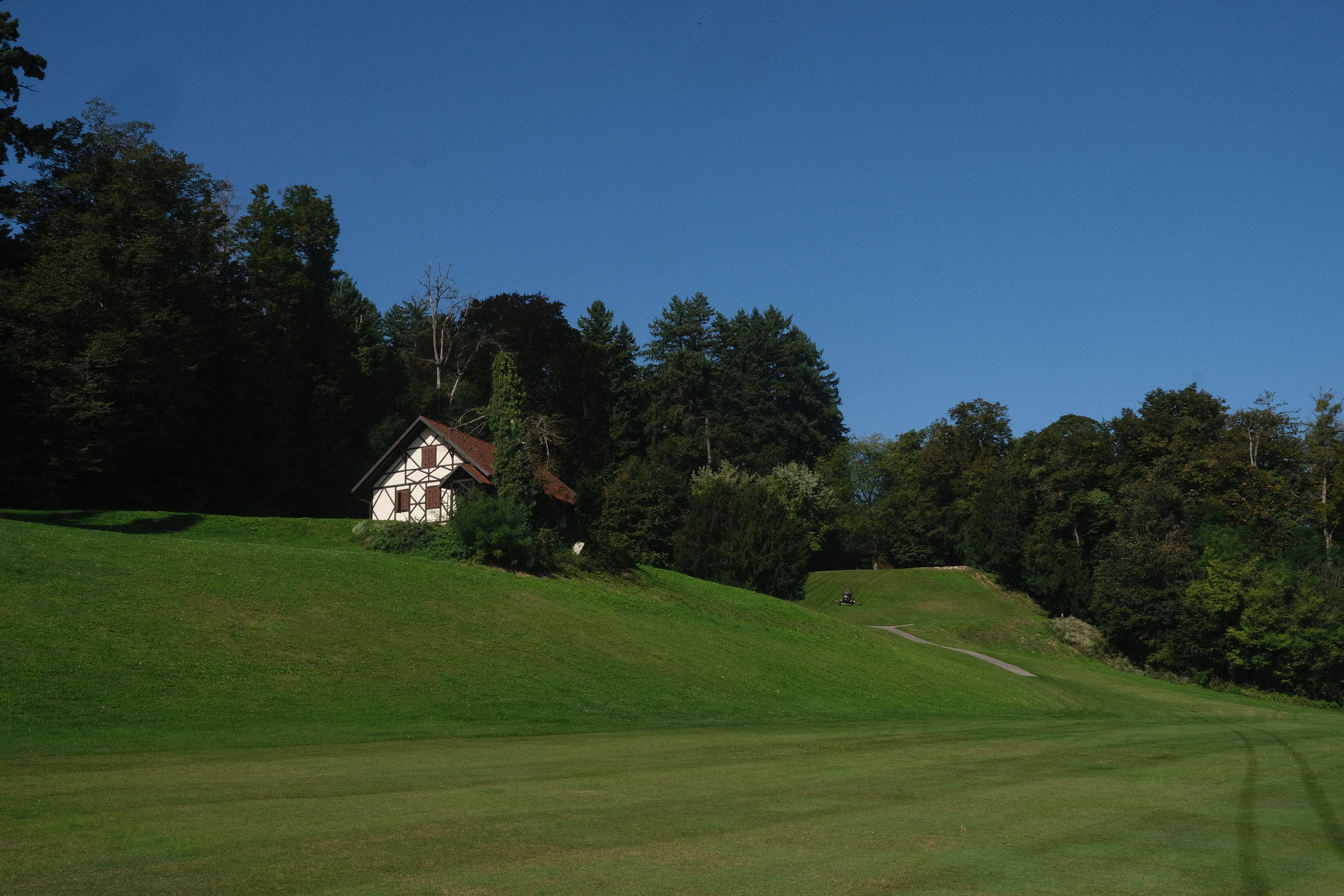
The golf course.
