= Archery =

Using a bow to shoot arrows

Archery competition in June 1983 at Mönchengladbach, West Germany

Archery is the sport, practice, or skill of using a bow to shoot arrows at a target. The word comes from the Latin arcus, meaning bow. Historically, archery has been used for hunting and combat. In modern times, it is mainly a competitive sport and recreational activity. A person who practices archery is typically called an archer, bowman, or toxophilite.

== History ==
=== Origins and ancient archery ===
The oldest known evidence of arrows (not found with surviving bows) comes from South African sites such as Sibudu Cave, where the remains of bone and stone arrowheads have been found dating approximately 72,000 to 60,000 years ago.

However, the earliest remains of complete bows and arrows are found in Northern Europe. These include the evidence found at Mannheim-Vogelstang, in modern-day Germany, dated 17,500 to 18,000 years ago, and also at Stellmoor dated 11,000 years ago.

Azilian points found in Grotte du Bichon, Switzerland, alongside the remains of both a bear and a hunter, with flint fragments found in the bear's third vertebra, suggest the use of arrows at 13,500 years ago.

Other signs of its use in Europe come from the Stellmoor in the Ahrensburg valley north of Hamburg, Germany and dates from the late Paleolithic, about 10,000–9000 BC. The arrows were made of pine and consisted of a main shaft and a 15–20 cm (5.9–7.9 in) fore shaft with a flint point. There are no definite earlier bows; previous pointed shafts are known, but may have been launched by spear-throwers rather than bows. The oldest bows known so far comes from the Holmegård swamp in Denmark. At the site of Nataruk in Turkana County, Kenya, obsidian bladelets found embedded in a skull and within the thoracic cavity of another skeleton, suggest the use of stone-tipped arrows as weapons about 10,000 years ago. Bows eventually replaced the spear-thrower as the predominant means for launching shafted projectiles, on every continent except Australasia, though spear-throwers persisted alongside the bow in parts of the Americas, including Mexico and among the Inuit.

Bows and arrows have been present in Egyptian and neighbouring Nubian culture since its respective predynastic and Pre-Kerma origins. In the Levant, artifacts that could be arrow-shaft straighteners are known from the Natufian culture, (c. 10,800–8,300 BC) onwards.

Classical civilizations, notably the Babylonians, Assyrians, Greeks, Armenians, Persians, Parthians, Romans, Indians, Koreans, Chinese, and Japanese fielded large numbers of archers in their armies. Akkadians were the first to use composite bows in war according to the victory stele of Naram-Sin of Akkad. Egyptians referred to Nubia as "Ta-Seti," or "The Land of the Bow," since the Nubians were known to be expert archers, and by the 16th century BC Egyptians were using the composite bow in warfare. The Bronze Age Aegean Cultures were able to deploy a number of state-owned specialized bow makers for warfare and hunting purposes already from the 15th century BC. The Welsh longbow proved its worth for the first time in Continental warfare at the Battle of Crécy. In the Americas archery was widespread at European contact.

Archery was highly developed in Asia. The composite bow was likely invented in central Asia, with the Scythians being the likely inventors of the first composite bows. The Sanskrit term for archery, dhanurvidya, came to refer to martial arts in general. In East Asia, Goguryeo, one of the Three Kingdoms of Korea was well known for its regiments of exceptionally skilled archers.

=== Medieval archery ===
The medieval shortbow was technically identical with the classical era bows, having a range of approximately 91 m (299 ft). It was the primary ranged weapon of the battlefield through the early medieval period. Around the tenth century the crossbow was introduced in Europe. Crossbows generally had a longer range, greater accuracy and more penetration than the shortbow, but suffered from a much slower rate of fire. Crossbows were used in the early Crusades, with models having a range of 274 m (899 ft) and being able to penetrate armour or kill a horse.

During the late medieval period the English army famously relied on massed archers armed with the longbow. The French army relied more on the crossbow. Like their predecessors archers were more likely to be peasants or yeomen than men-at-arms. The longbow had a range of up to 270 m (890 ft). However its lack of accuracy at long ranges made it a mass weapon rather than an individual one. Significant victories attributable to the longbow, such as the Battle of Crecy and Battle of Agincourt resulted in the English longbow becoming part of military lore.

=== Mounted archery ===
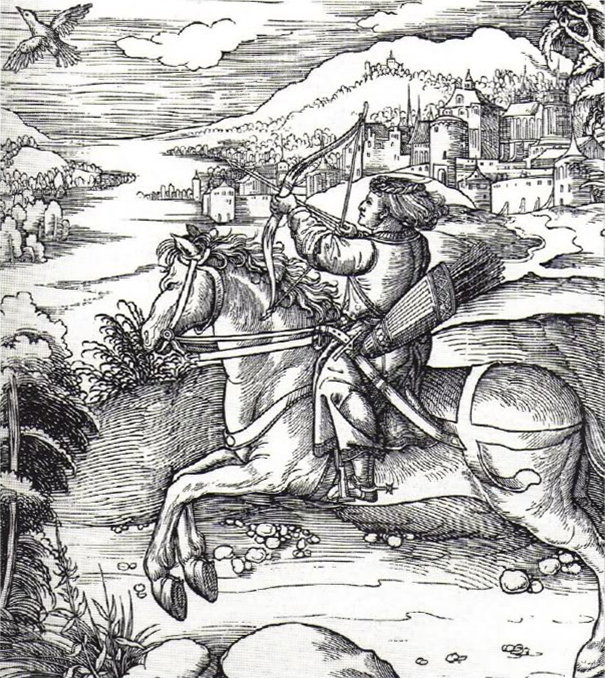
Hunting for flying birds from the back of a galloping horse was considered the top category of archery. The favourite hobby of Prince Maximilian, engraved by Dürer

The Scythians became extremely adept at archery on horseback, and may have invented the first true composite bow, which they spread across Europe and Asia. Lightly armoured, but highly mobile archers were excellently suited to warfare in the Central Asian steppes, and they formed a large part of armies that repeatedly conquered large areas of Eurasia. Shorter bows are more suited to use on horseback, and the composite bow enabled mounted archers to use powerful weapons. Seljuk Turks used mounted archers against the European First Crusade, especially at the Battle of Dorylaeum (1097). One of their tactics was to shoot at the enemy infantry, and use their superior mobility to prevent the enemy from closing with them. Empires throughout the Eurasian landmass often strongly associated their respective "barbarian" counterparts with the usage of the bow and arrow, to the point where powerful states like the Han dynasty referred to their neighbours, the Xiong-nu, as "Those Who Draw the Bow". For example, Xiong-nu mounted bowmen made them more than a match for the Han military. It is possible that "barbarian" peoples were responsible for introducing archery or certain types of bows to their "civilized" counterparts.

Native Americans developed a culture of horseback archery after the introduction of the horse by European explorers in the second millennium.

=== Decline of archery ===
The development of firearms rendered the bow and arrow obsolete in warfare, although efforts were sometimes made to preserve archery practice. In England and Wales, for example, the government tried to enforce practice with the longbow until the end of the 16th century. This was because it was recognized that the bow had been instrumental to military success during the Hundred Years' War. Despite the high social status, ongoing utility, and widespread pleasure of archery in Armenia, China, Egypt, England and Wales, the Americas, India, Japan, Korea, Turkey and elsewhere, almost every culture that gained access to even early firearms used them widely, to the neglect of archery. Early firearms were inferior in rate-of-fire, and were very sensitive to wet weather. However, they had longer effective range and were tactically superior in the common situation of soldiers shooting at each other from behind obstructions. They also required significantly less training to use properly, in particular penetrating steel armor without any need to develop special musculature. Armies equipped with guns could thus provide superior firepower, and highly trained archers became obsolete on the battlefield. However, the bow and arrow is still an effective weapon, and archers have seen military action in the 21st century. Traditional archery remains in use for sport, and for hunting in many areas.

=== English 18th-century revival as a sport ===
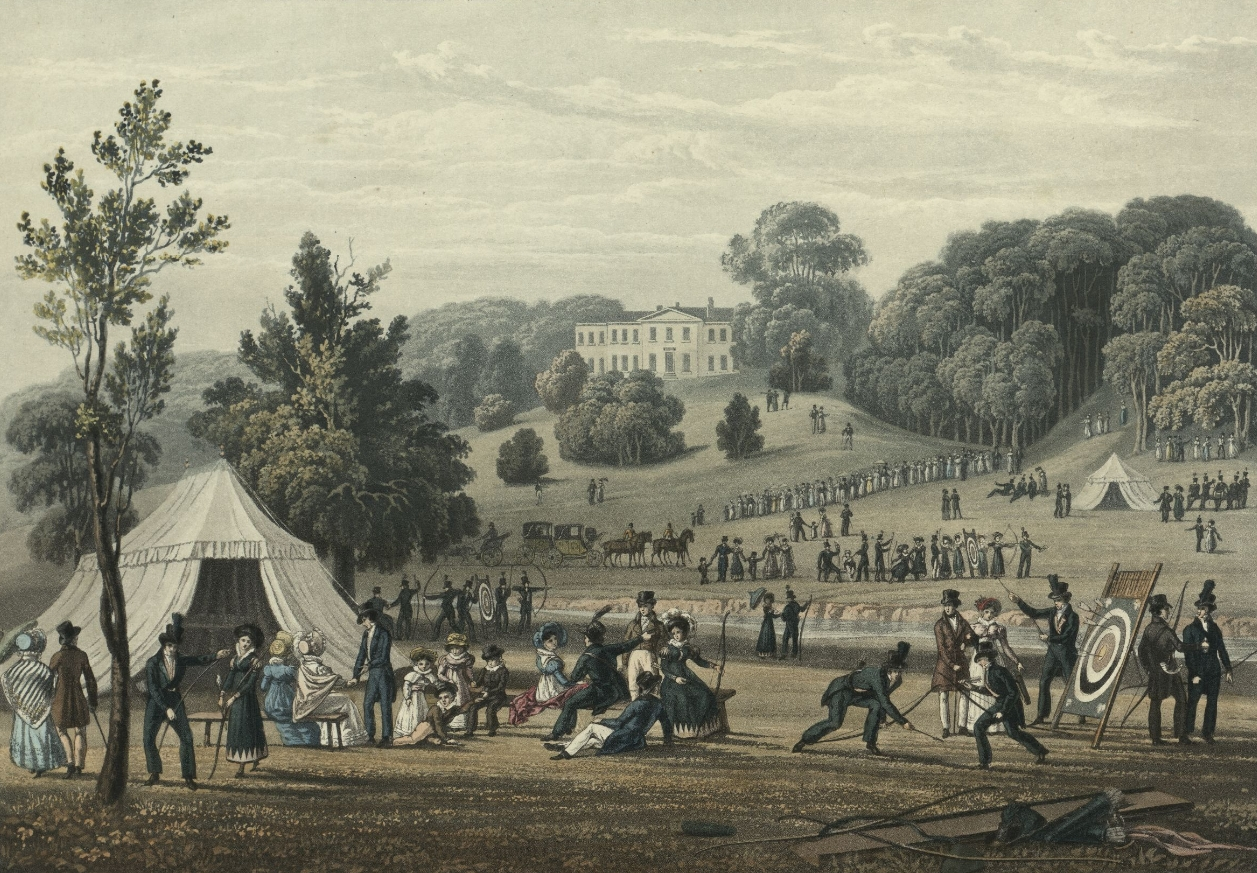
A print of the 1822 meeting of the "Royal British Bowmen" archery club.

Early recreational archery societies included the Finsbury Archers in England and the Ancient Society of Kilwinning Archers in Scotland. The latter's annual Papingo event was first recorded in 1483. (In this event, archers shoot vertically from the base of an abbey tower to dislodge a wood pigeon placed approximately 30 m (98 ft) above.) The Royal Company of Archers was formed in 1676 and is one of the oldest sporting bodies in the world. Archery remained a small and scattered pastime, however, until the late 18th century when it experienced a fashionable revival among the aristocracy. Sir Ashton Lever, an antiquarian and collector, formed the Toxophilite Society in London in 1781, with the patronage of George, the Prince of Wales.

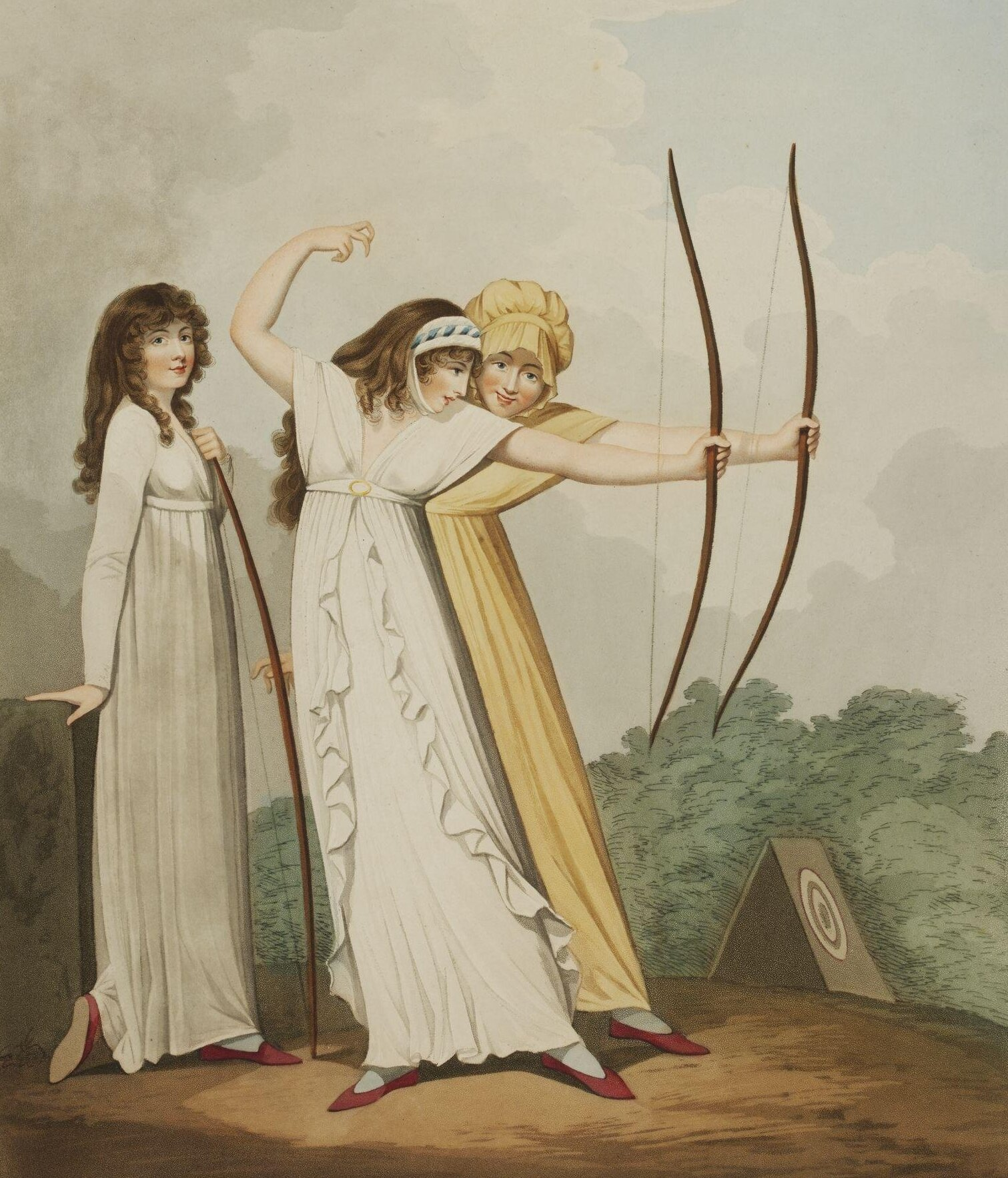
Fashionable female archers, 1799

Archery societies were set up across the country, each with its own strict entry criteria and outlandish costumes. Recreational archery soon became extravagant social and ceremonial events for the nobility, complete with flags, music and 21-gun salutes for the competitors. The clubs were "the drawing rooms of the great country houses placed outside" and thus came to play an important role in the social networks of the local upper class. As well as its emphasis on display and status, the sport was notable for its popularity with females. Young women could not only compete in the contests but retain and show off their sexuality while doing so. Thus, archery came to act as a forum for introductions, flirtation and romance. It was often consciously styled in the manner of a Medieval tournament with titles and laurel wreaths being presented as a reward to the victor. General meetings were held from 1789, in which local lodges convened together to standardise the rules and ceremonies. Archery was also co-opted as a distinctively British tradition, dating back to the lore of Robin Hood and it served as a patriotic form of entertainment at a time of political tension in Europe. The societies were also elitist, and the new middle class bourgeoisie were excluded from the clubs due to their lack of social status.

After the Napoleonic Wars, the sport became increasingly popular among all classes, and it was framed as a nostalgic reimagining of the preindustrial rural Britain. Particularly influential was Sir Walter Scott's 1819 novel, Ivanhoe that depicted the heroic character Lockseley winning an archery tournament.

An archery in the coat of arms of Lieksa, based on the 1669 seal of the old town of Brahea.

=== A modern sport ===
The 1840s saw the second attempts at turning the recreation into a modern sport. The first Grand National Archery Society meeting was held in York in 1844 and over the next decade the extravagant and festive practices of the past were gradually whittled away and the rules were standardized as the 'York Round' - a series of shoots at 55 m (180 ft), 73 m (240 ft), and 91 m (299 ft). Horace A. Ford helped to improve archery standards and pioneered new archery techniques. He won the Grand National 11 times in a row and published a highly influential guide to the sport in 1856.

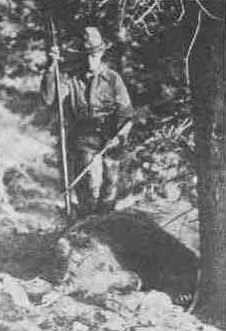
Picture of Saxton Pope taken while grizzly hunting at Yellowstone

Towards the end of the 19th century, the sport experienced declining participation as alternative sports such as croquet and tennis became more popular among the middle class. By 1889, just 50 archery clubs were left in Britain, but it was still included as a sport at the 1900 Paris Olympics.

The National Archery Association of the United States was organized in 1879, in part by Maurice Thompson (the author of the seminal text "The Witchery of Archery") and his brother Will Thompson. Maurice was president in its inaugural year and Will was president in 1882, 1903, and 1904. The 1910 President was Frank E Canfield. Today it is known as USA Archery and is recognized by United States Olympic & Paralympic Committee.

In the United States, primitive archery was revived in the early 20th century. The last of the Yahi Indian tribe, a native known as Ishi, came out of hiding in California in 1911. His doctor, Saxton Pope, learned many of Ishi's traditional archery skills, and popularized them. The Pope and Young Club, founded in 1961 and named in honor of Pope and his friend, Arthur Young, became one of North America's leading bowhunting and conservation organizations. Founded as a nonprofit scientific organization, the Club was patterned after the prestigious Boone and Crockett Club and advocated responsible bowhunting by promoting quality, fair chase hunting, and sound conservation practices.

Five women taking part in an archery contest in 1931

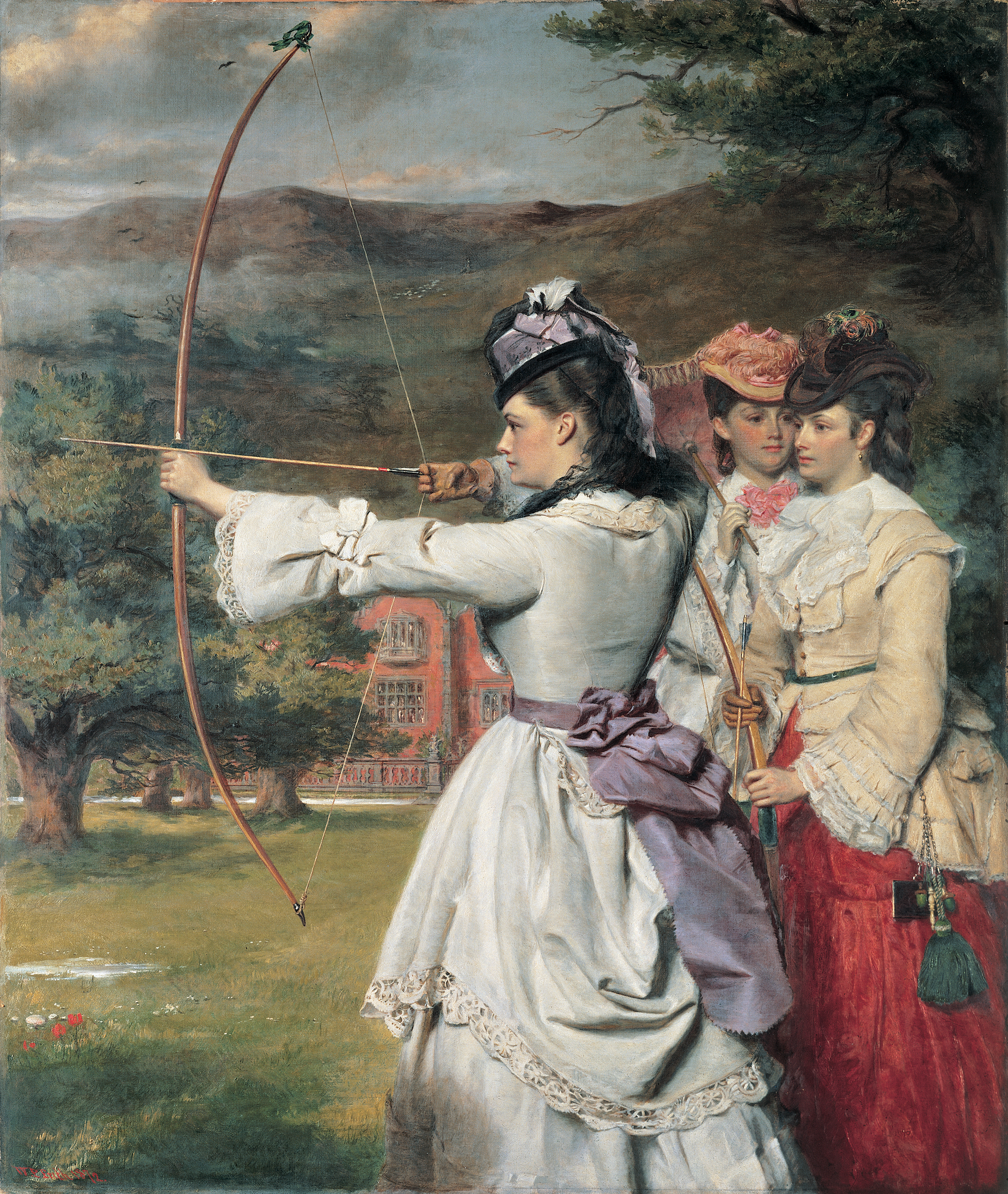
William Powell Frith, The Fair Toxophilites (1872)

From the 1920s, professional engineers took an interest in archery, previously the exclusive field of traditional craft experts. They led the commercial development of new forms of bow including the modern recurve and compound bow. These modern forms are now dominant in modern Western archery; traditional bows are in a minority. Archery returned to the Olympics in 1972. In the 1980s, the skills of traditional archery were revived by American enthusiasts, and combined with the new scientific understanding. Much of this expertise is available in the Traditional Bowyer's Bibles (see Further reading). Modern game archery owes much of its success to Fred Bear, an American bow hunter and bow manufacturer.

=== Mythology ===
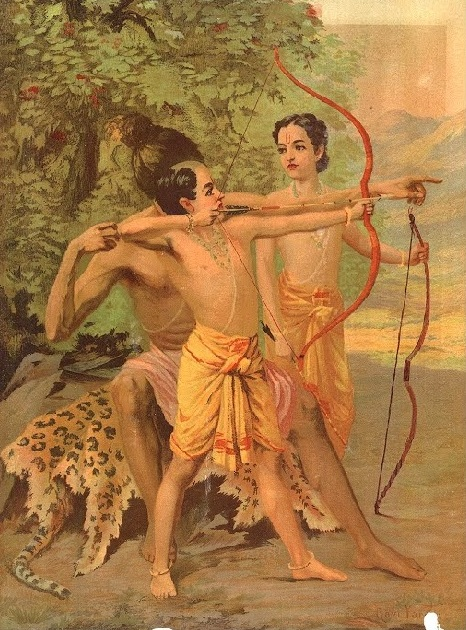
Vishwamitra archery training from Ramayana

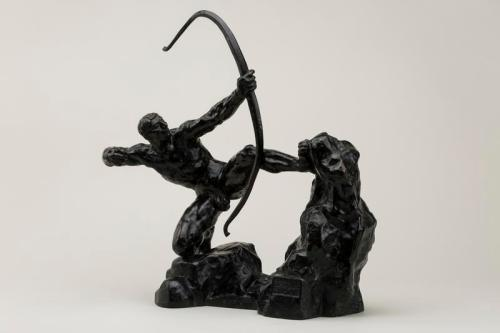
Herakles the Archer by Émile Antoine Bourdelle

Deities and heroes in several mythologies are described as archers, including the Greek Artemis and Apollo, the Roman Diana and Cupid, the Germanic Agilaz, continuing in legends like those of Wilhelm Tell, Palnetoke, or Robin Hood. Armenian Hayk and Babylonian Marduk, Indian Karna (also known as Radheya/son of Radha), Abhimanyu, Eklavya, Arjuna, Bhishma, Drona, Rama, and Shiva were known for their shooting skills. The famous archery competition of hitting the eye of a rotating fish while watching its reflection in the water bowl was one of the many archery skills depicted in the Mahabharata. Persian Arash was a famous archer. Earlier Greek representations of Heracles normally depict him as an archer. Archery, and the bow, play an important part in the epic poem the Odyssey, when Odysseus returns home in disguise and then bests the suitors in an archery competition after hinting at his identity by stringing and drawing his great bow that only he can draw, a similar motif is present in the Turkic Iranian heroic archeheroic poem Alpamysh.

Three of the Hyperborean Maidens were worshipped on the Greek island of Delos as attendants of Artemis, presiding over aspects of archery; Hekaerge (Ἑκαέργη), represented distancing, Loxo (Λοξώ), trajectory, and Oupis (Οὖπις), aim.

Yi the archer and his apprentice Feng Meng appear in several early Chinese myths, and the historical character of Zhou Tong features in many fictional forms. Jumong, the first Taewang of the Goguryeo kingdom of the Three Kingdoms of Korea, is claimed by legend to have been a near-godlike archer. Archery features in the story of Oguz Khagan. Similarly, archery and the bow feature heavily into historical Korean identity.

In West African Yoruba belief, Osoosi is one of several deities of the hunt who are identified with bow and arrow iconography and other insignia associated with archery.

== Equipment ==
=== Types of bows ===
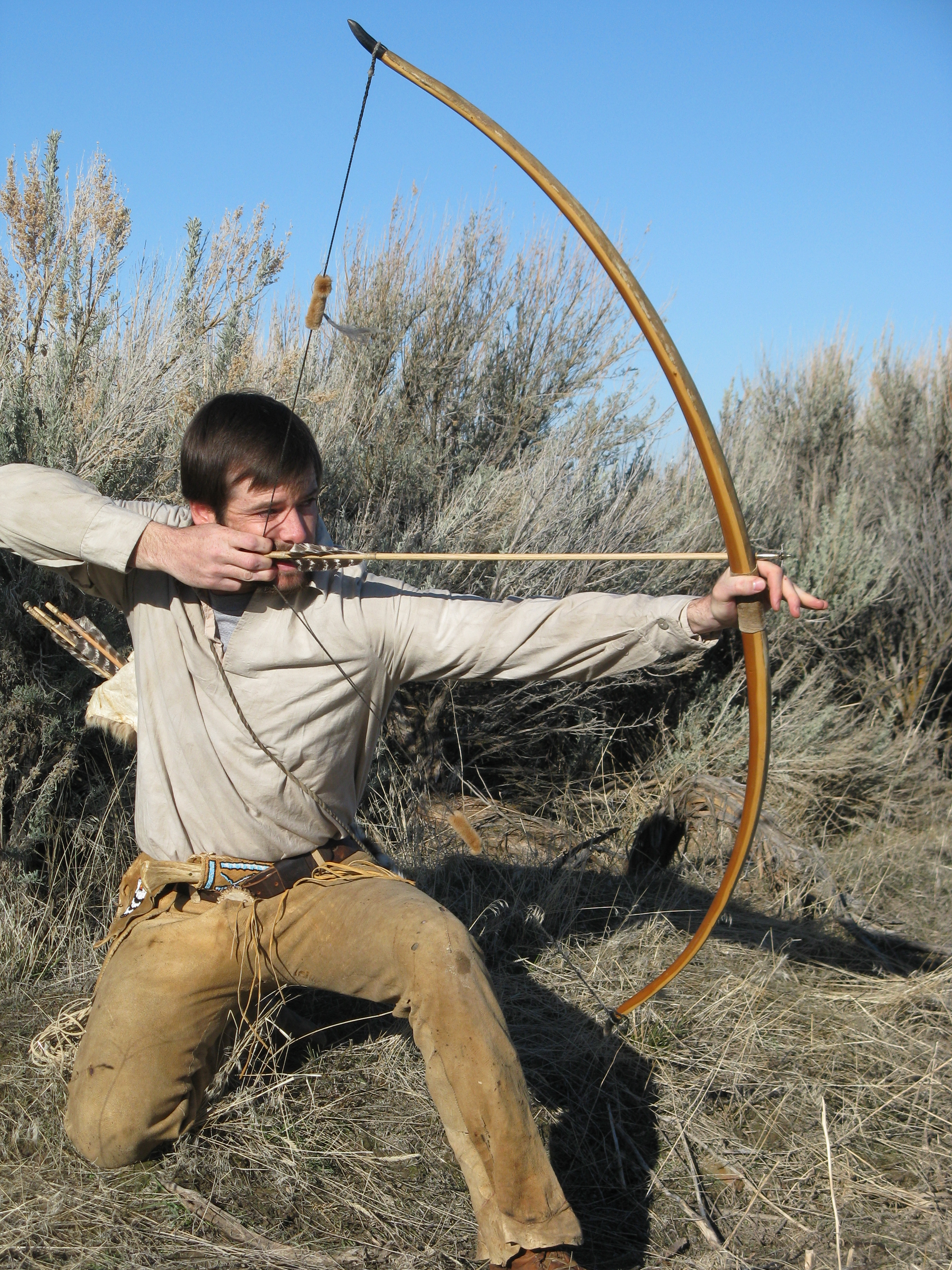
A Pacific yew selfbow drawn by the split finger method. Selfbows are made from a single piece of wood.

While there is great variety in the construction details of bows (both historical and modern), all bows consist of a string attached to elastic limbs that store mechanical energy imparted by the user drawing the string. Bows may be broadly split into two categories: those drawn by pulling the string directly and those that use a mechanism to pull the string.

Directly drawn bows may be further divided based upon differences in the method of limb construction, notable examples being self bows, laminated bows, and composite bows. Bows can also be classified by the bow shape of the limbs when unstrung; in contrast to traditional European straight bows, a recurve bow and some types of longbow have tips that curve away from the archer when the bow is unstrung. The cross-section of the limb also varies; the classic longbow is a tall bow with narrow limbs that are D-shaped in cross section, and the flatbow has flat wide limbs that are approximately rectangular in cross-section. Cable-backed bows use cords as the back of the bow; the draw weight of the bow can be adjusted by changing the tension of the cable. They were widespread among Inuit who lacked easy access to good bow wood. One variety of cable-backed bow is the Penobscot bow or Wabenaki bow, invented by Frank Loring (Chief Big Thunder) about 1900. It consists of a small bow attached by cables on the back of a larger main bow.

In different cultures, the arrows are released from either the left or right side of the bow, and this affects the hand grip and position of the bow. In Arab archery, Turkish archery, and Japanese archery, the arrows are released from the right hand side of the bow, and this affects construction of the bow. In western archery, the arrow is usually released from the left hand side of the bow for a right-handed archer.

Compound bows are designed to reduce the force required to hold the string at full draw, hence allowing the archer more time to aim with less muscular stress. Most compound designs use cams or elliptical wheels on the ends of the limbs to achieve this. A typical let-off is anywhere from 65% to 80%. For example, a 27 kg (60 lb) bow with 80% let-off only requires 53 N (12 lb_{f}) to hold at full draw. Up to 99% let-off is possible. The compound bow was invented by Holless Wilbur Allen in the 1960s (a US patent was filed in 1966 and granted in 1969) and it has become the most widely used type of bow for all forms of archery in North America.

Mechanically drawn bows typically have a stock or other mounting, such as the crossbow. Crossbows typically have shorter draw lengths compared to compound bows. Because of this, heavier draw weights are required to achieve the same energy transfer to the arrow. These mechanically drawn bows also have devices to hold the tension when the bow is fully drawn. They are not limited by the strength of a single archer and larger varieties have been used as siege engines.

=== Types of arrows and fletchings ===
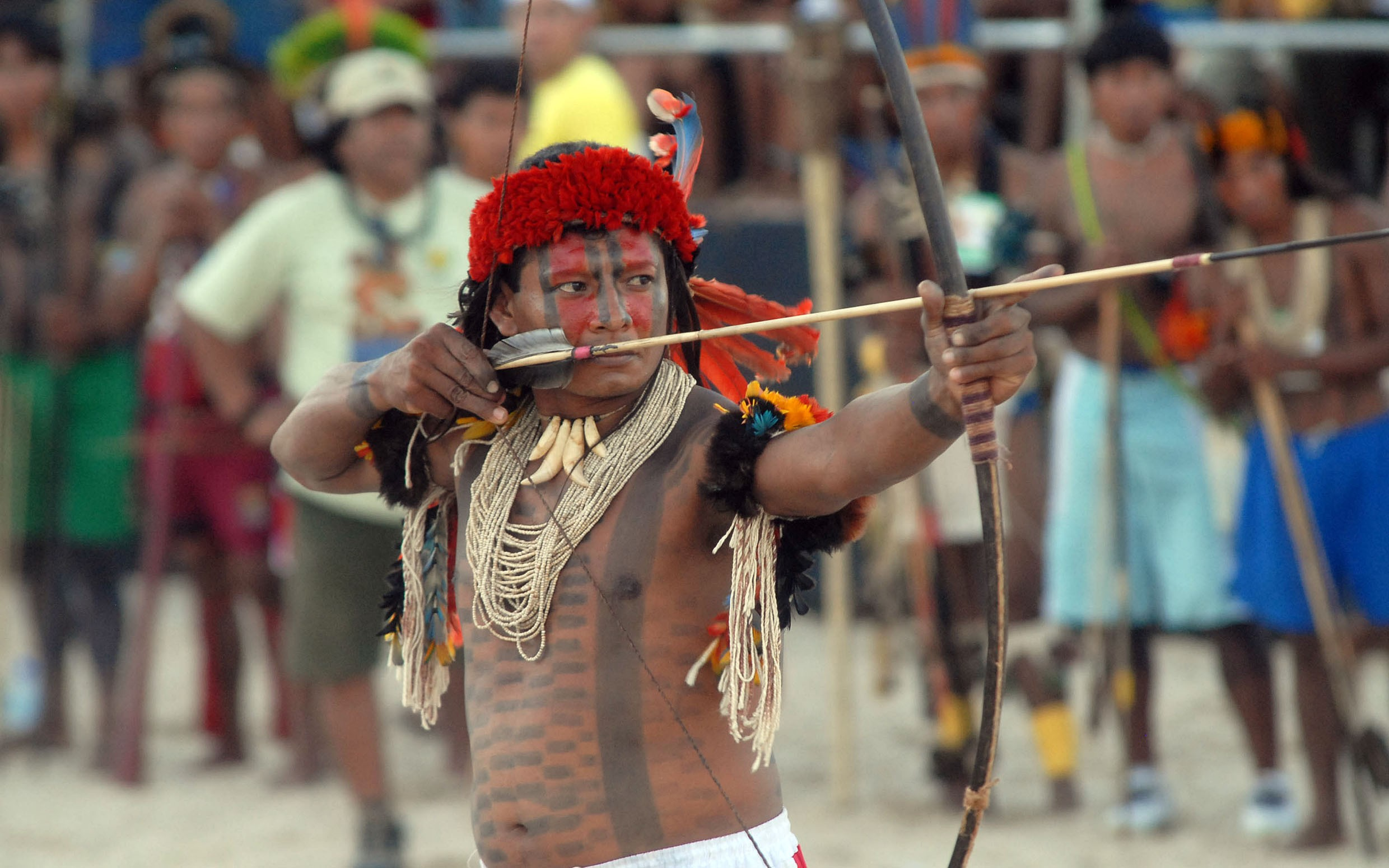
A Rikbaktsa archer competes at Brazil's Indigenous Games

The most common form of arrow consists of a shaft, with an arrowhead at the front end, and fletchings and a nock at the other end. Arrows across time and history have normally been carried in a container known as a quiver, which can take many different forms. Shafts of arrows are typically composed of solid wood, bamboo, fiberglass, aluminium alloy, carbon fiber, or composite materials. Wooden arrows are prone to warping. Fiberglass arrows are brittle, but can be produced to uniform specifications easily. Aluminium shafts were a very popular high-performance choice in the latter half of the 20th century, due to their straightness, lighter weight, and subsequently higher speed and flatter trajectories. Carbon fiber arrows became popular in the 1990s because they are very light, flying even faster and flatter than aluminium arrows. Today, the most popular arrows at tournaments and Olympic events are made of composite materials.

The arrowhead is the primary functional component of the arrow. Some arrows may simply use a sharpened tip of the solid shaft, but separate arrowheads are far more common, usually made from metal, stone, or other hard materials. The most commonly used forms are target points, field points, and broadheads, although there are also other types, such as bodkin, judo, and blunt heads.

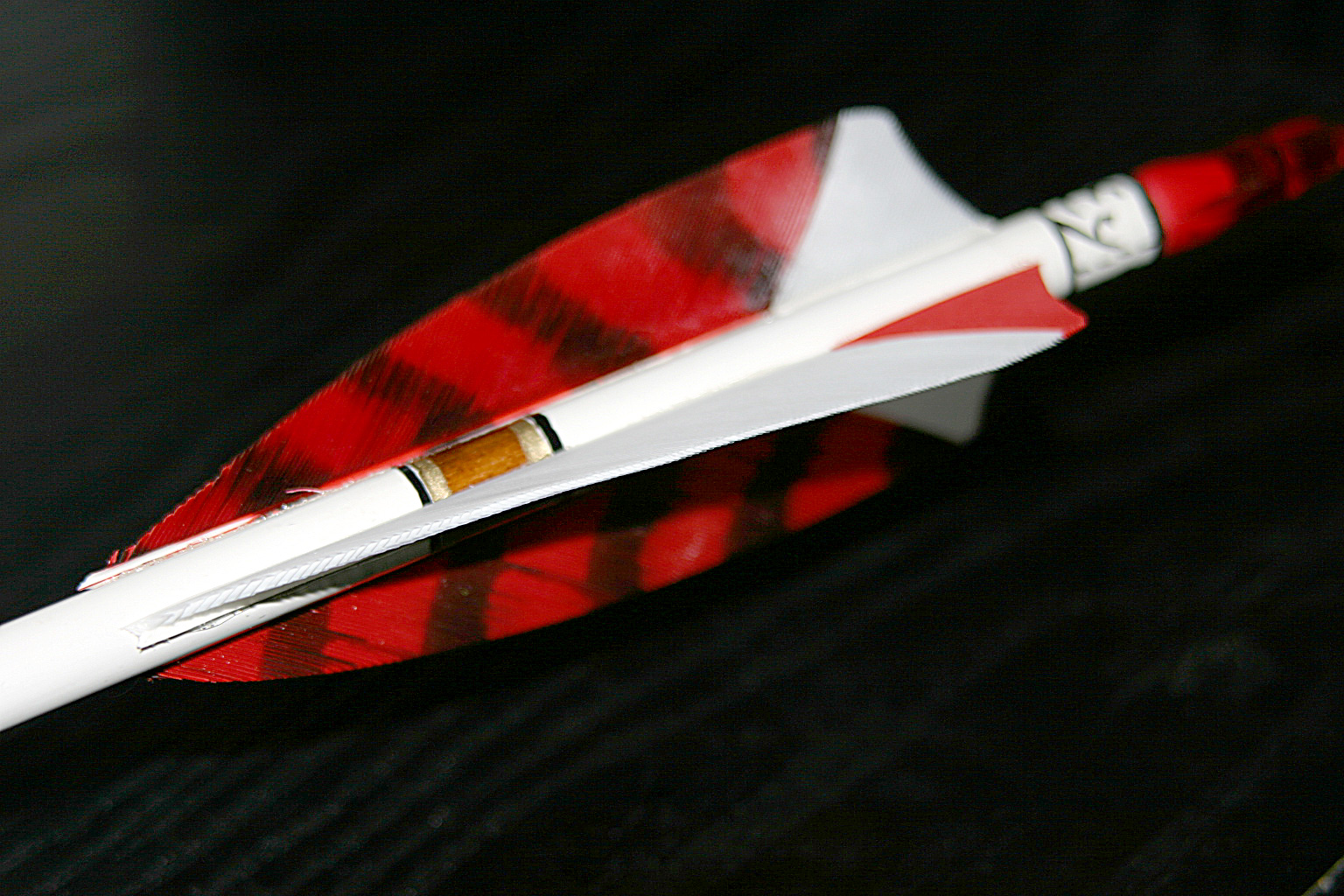
Shield cut straight fletching – here the hen feathers are barred red

Fletching is traditionally made from bird feathers, but solid plastic vanes and thin sheet-like spin vanes are used. They are attached near the nock (rear) end of the arrow with thin double sided tape, glue, or, traditionally, sinew. The most common configuration in all cultures is three fletches, though as many as six have been used. Two makes the arrow unstable in flight. When the arrow is three-fletched, the fletches are equally spaced around the shaft, with one placed such that it is perpendicular to the bow when nocked on the string, though variations are seen with modern equipment, especially when using the modern spin vanes. This fletch is called the "index fletch" or "cock feather" (also known as "the odd vane out" or "the nocking vane"), and the others are sometimes called the "hen feathers". Commonly, the cock feather is of a different color. However, if archers are using fletching made of feather or similar material, they may use same color vanes, as different dyes can give varying stiffness to vanes, resulting in less precision. When an arrow is four-fletched, two opposing fletches are often cock feathers, and occasionally the fletches are not evenly spaced.

The fletching may be either parabolic cut (short feathers in a smooth parabolic curve) or shield cut (generally shaped like half of a narrow shield), and is often attached at an angle, known as helical fletching, to introduce a stabilizing spin to the arrow while in flight. Whether helical or straight fletched, when natural fletching (bird feathers) is used it is critical that all feathers come from the same side of the bird. Oversized fletchings can be used to accentuate drag and thus limit the range of the arrow significantly; these arrows are called flu-flus. Misplacement of fletchings can change the arrow's flight path dramatically.

=== Bowstring ===
Dacron and other modern materials offer high strength for their weight and are used on most modern bows. Linen and other traditional materials are still used on traditional bows. Several modern methods of making a bowstring exist, such as the 'endless loop' and 'Flemish twist'. Almost any fiber can be made into a bowstring. The author of Arab Archery suggests the hide of a young, emaciated camel. Njál's saga describes the refusal of a wife, Hallgerður, to cut her hair to make an emergency bowstring for her husband, Gunnar Hámundarson, who is then killed.

=== Protective equipment ===
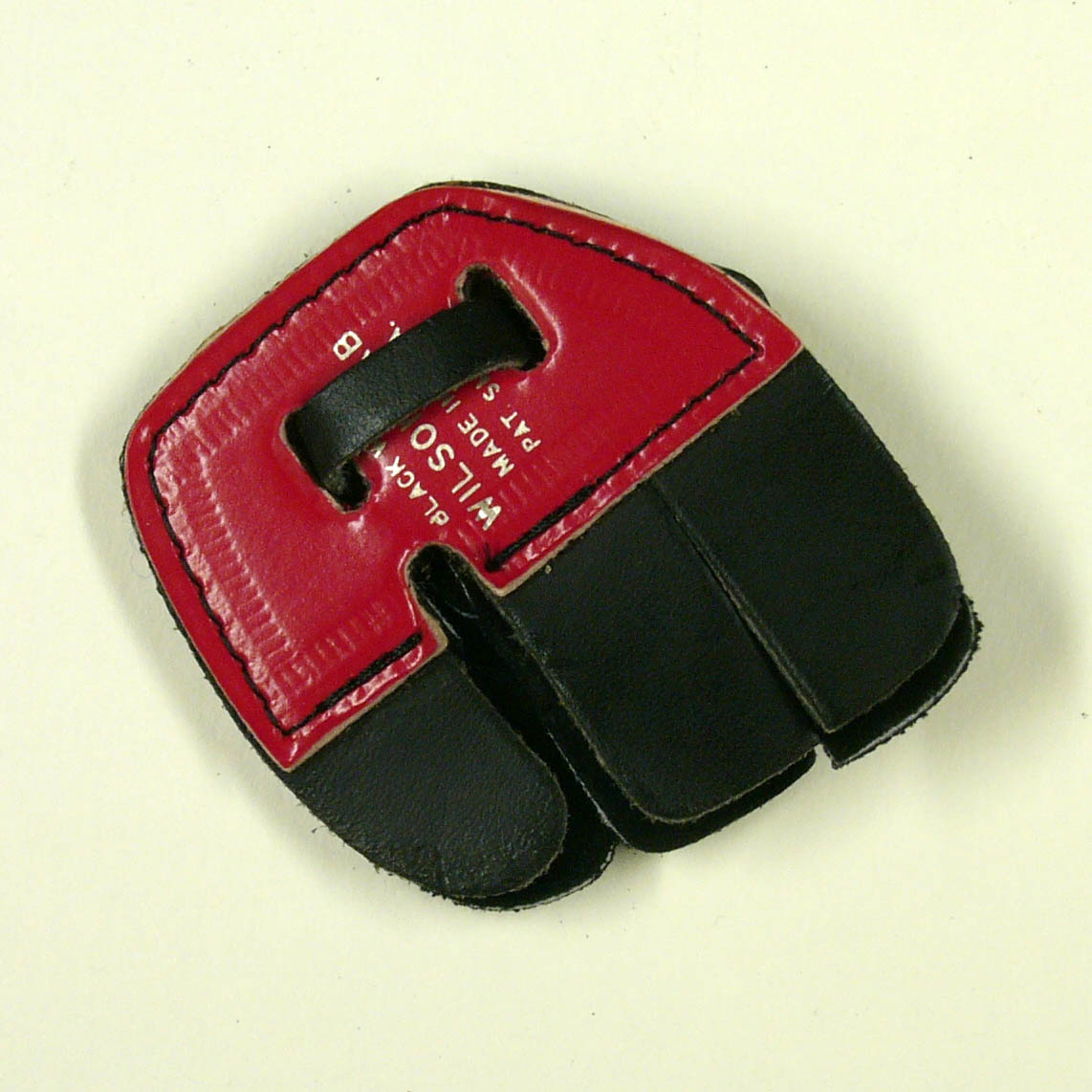
A right-hand finger tab to protect the hand while the string is drawn

Most modern archers wear a bracer (also known as an arm-guard) to protect the inside of the bow arm from being hit by the string and prevent clothing from catching the bowstring. The bracer does not brace the arm; the word comes from the armoury term "brassard", meaning an armoured sleeve or badge. The Navajo people have developed highly ornamented bracers as non-functional items of adornment. Some archers (nearly all female archers) wear protection on their chests, called chestguards or plastrons. The myth of the Amazons was that they had one breast removed to solve this problem. Roger Ascham mentions one archer, presumably with an unusual shooting style, who wore a leather guard for his face.

The drawing digits are normally protected by a leather tab, glove, or thumb ring. A simple tab of leather is commonly used, as is a skeleton glove. Medieval Europeans probably used a complete leather glove.

Eurasiatic archers who used the thumb or Mongolian draw protected their thumbs, usually with leather according to the author of Arab Archery, but also with special rings of various hard materials. Many surviving Turkish and Chinese examples are works of considerable art. Some are so highly ornamented that the users could not have used them to loose an arrow. Possibly these were items of personal adornment, and hence value, remaining extant whilst leather had virtually no intrinsic value and would also deteriorate with time. In traditional Japanese archery a special glove is used that has a ridge to assist in drawing the string.

=== Release aids ===
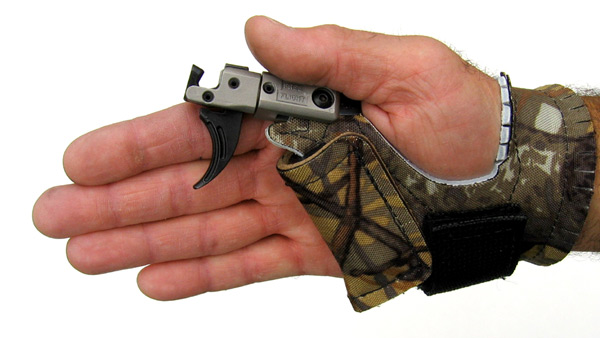
Release aid

A release aid is a mechanical device designed to give a crisp and precise loose of arrows from a compound bow. In the most commonly used, the string is released by a finger-operated trigger mechanism, held in the archer's hand or attached to their wrist. In another type, known as a back-tension release, the string is automatically released when drawn to a pre-determined tension.

=== Stabilizers ===
Stabilizers are mounted at various points on the bow. Common with competitive archery equipment are special brackets that allow multiple stabilizers to be mounted at various angles to fine tune the bow's balance.

Stabilizers aid in aiming by improving the balance of the bow. Sights, quivers, rests, and design of the riser (the central, non-bending part of the bow) make one side of the bow heavier. One purpose of stabilizers are to offset these forces. A reflex riser design will cause the top limb to lean towards the shooter. In this case a heavier front stabilizer is desired to offset this action. A deflex riser design has the opposite effect and a lighter front stabilizer may be used.

Stabilizers can reduce noise and vibration. These energies are absorbed by viscoelastic polymers, gels, powders, and other materials used to build stabilizers.

Stabilizers improve the forgiveness and accuracy by increasing the moment of inertia of the bow to resist movement during the shooting process. Lightweight carbon stabilizers with weighted ends are desirable because they improve the moment of inertia while minimizing the weight added.

== Shooting technique and form ==
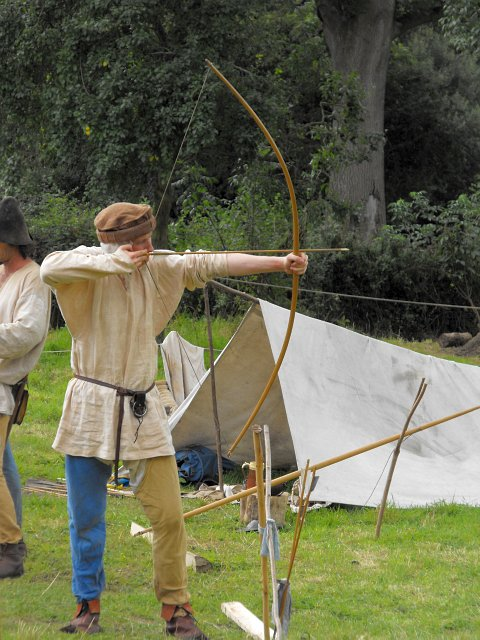
Historical reenactment of medieval archery

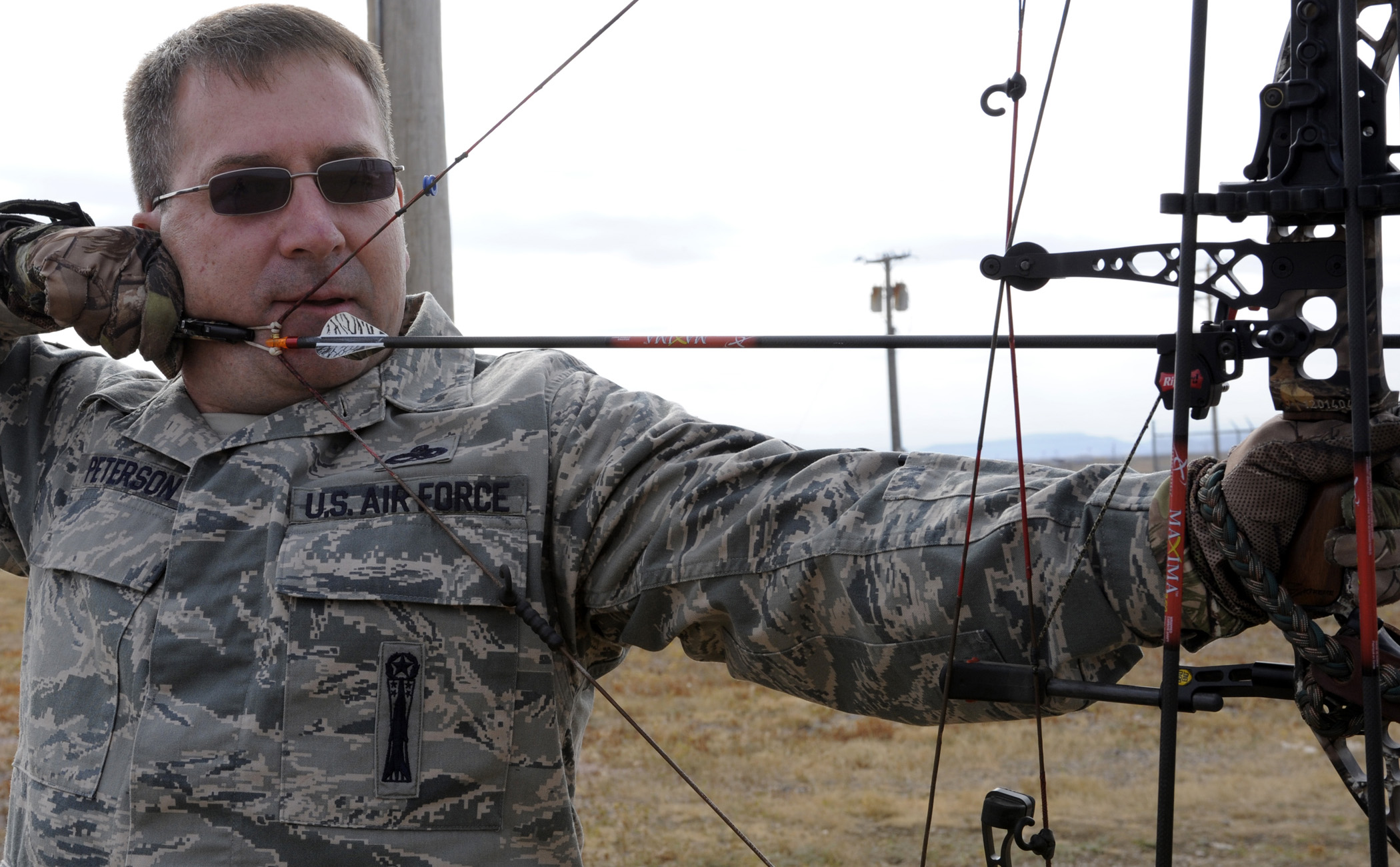
Chief Master Sgt. Kevin Peterson demonstrates safe archery techniques while aiming an arrow at a target on the 28th Force Support Squadron trap and skeet range at Ellsworth Air Force Base, S.D., 11 October 2012.

The standard convention on teaching archery is to hold the bow depending upon eye dominance. (One exception is in modern kyūdō where all archers are trained to hold the bow in the left hand.) Therefore, if one is right-eye dominant, they would hold the bow in the left hand and draw the string with the right hand. However, not everyone agrees with this line of thought. A smoother, and more fluid release of the string will produce the most consistently repeatable shots, and therefore may provide greater accuracy of the arrow flight. Some believe that the hand with the greatest dexterity should therefore be the hand that draws and releases the string. Either eye can be used for aiming, and the less dominant eye can be trained over time to become more effective for use. To assist with this, an eye patch can be temporarily worn over the dominant eye.

The hand that holds the bow is referred to as the bow hand and its arm the bow arm. The opposite hand is called the drawing hand or string hand. Terms such as bow shoulder or string elbow follow the same convention.

If shooting according to eye dominance, right-eye-dominant archers shooting conventionally hold the bow with their left hand. If shooting according to hand dexterity, the archer draws the string with the hand that possesses the greatest dexterity, regardless of eye dominance.

=== Modern form ===
In modern target archery, the standard shooting stance positions the archer's body at or nearly perpendicular to the target and the shooting line, with feet placed approximately shoulder-width apart. This is commonly referred to as a "neutral stance". More experienced archers may adopt variations such as an "open stance" (front foot angled toward the target) or "closed stance" (front foot angled away), depending on the individual preference and shooting style.

To load, the bow is pointed toward the ground, tipped slightly clockwise of vertical (for a right handed shooter) and the shaft of the arrow is placed on the arrow rest or shelf. The back of the arrow is attached to the bowstring with the nock (a small locking groove located at the proximal end of the arrow). This step is called "nocking the arrow". Typical arrows with three vanes should be oriented such that a single vane, the "cock feather", is pointing away from the bow, to improve the clearance of the arrow as it passes the arrow rest.

A compound bow is fitted with a special type of arrow rest, known as a launcher, and the arrow is usually loaded with the cock feather/vane pointed either up, or down, depending upon the type of launcher being used.

The bowstring and arrow are held with three fingers, or with a mechanical arrow release. Most commonly, for finger shooters, the index finger is placed above the arrow and the next two fingers below, although several other techniques have their adherents around the world, involving three fingers below the arrow, or an arrow pinching technique. Instinctive shooting is a technique eschewing sights and is often preferred by traditional archers (shooters of longbows and recurves). In either the split finger or three finger under case, the string is usually placed in the first or second joint, or else on the pads of the fingers. When using a mechanical release aid, the release is hooked directly onto the string, or onto the D-loop (a loop of string attached above and below the arrow's nocking point).

Another type of string hold, used on traditional bows, is the type favoured by the Mongol warriors, known as the "thumb release", style. This involves using the thumb to draw the string, with the fingers curling around the thumb to add some support. To release the string, the fingers are opened out and the thumb relaxes to allow the string to slide off the thumb. When using this type of release, the arrow should rest on the same side of the bow as the drawing hand i.e. Left hand draw = arrow on left side of bow.

The archer then raises the bow and draws the string, with varying alignments for vertical versus slightly canted bow positions. This is often one fluid motion for shooters of recurves and longbows, which tend to vary from archer to archer. Compound shooters often experience a slight jerk during the drawback, at around the last 4 cm (1.6 in), where the draw weight is at its maximum—before relaxing into a comfortable stable full draw position. The archer draws the string hand towards the face, where it should rest lightly at a fixed anchor point. This point is consistent from shot to shot, and is usually at the corner of the mouth, on the chin, to the cheek, or to the ear, depending on preferred shooting style. The archer holds the bow arm outwards, toward the target. The elbow of this arm should be rotated so that the inner elbow is perpendicular to the ground, though archers with hyper extendable elbows tend to angle the inner elbow toward the ground, as exemplified by the Korean archer Jang Yong-Ho. This keeps the forearm out of the way of the bowstring.

In modern form, the archer stands erect, forming a "T". The archer's lower trapezius muscles are used to pull the arrow to the anchor point. Some modern recurve bows are equipped with a mechanical device, called a clicker, which produces a clicking sound when the archer reaches the correct draw length. Traditional English Longbow shooters step "into the bow", exerting force with both the bow arm and the string hand arm simultaneously, especially when using bows having draw weights from 45 kg (99 lb) to over 80 kg (180 lb). Heavily stacked traditional bows (recurves, long bows, and the like) are released immediately upon reaching full draw at maximum weight, whereas compound bows reach their maximum weight around the last 4 cm (1.6 in), dropping holding weight significantly at full draw. Compound bows are often held at full draw for a short time to achieve maximum accuracy.

The arrow is typically released by relaxing the fingers of the drawing hand (see bow draw), or triggering the mechanical release aid. Usually the release aims to keep the drawing arm rigid, the bow hand relaxed, and the arrow is moved back using the back muscles, as opposed to using just arm motions. An archer should also pay attention to the recoil or follow through of his or her body, as it may indicate problems with form (technique) that affect accuracy.

Most modern day archers use an eleven step shooting process called the NTS (National Training System). These steps are; stance, knock, hook and grip, set, set-up, draw to load, anchor, aim, shot setup, release, follow through.

== Aiming methods ==
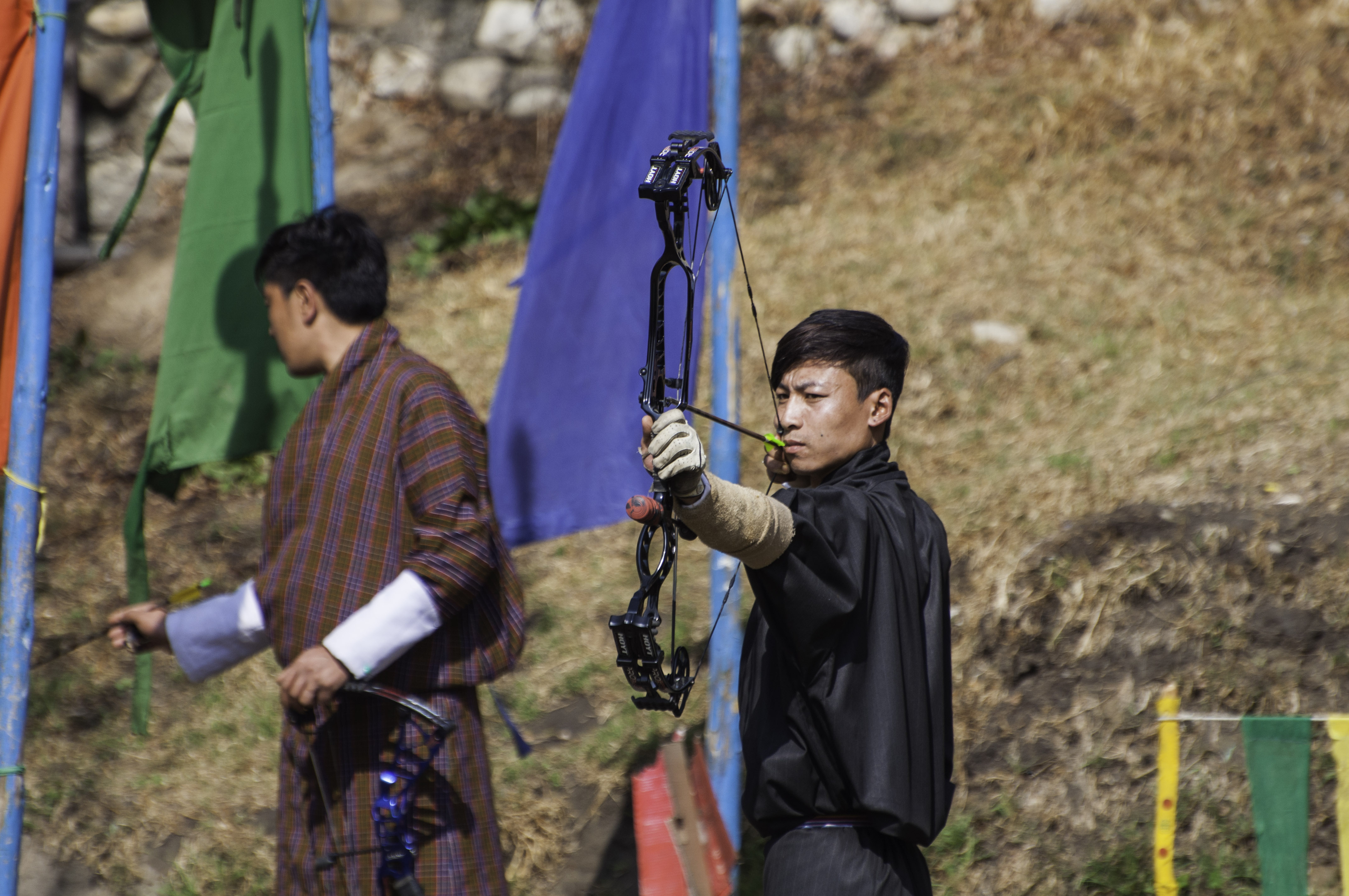
Archery in Bhutan

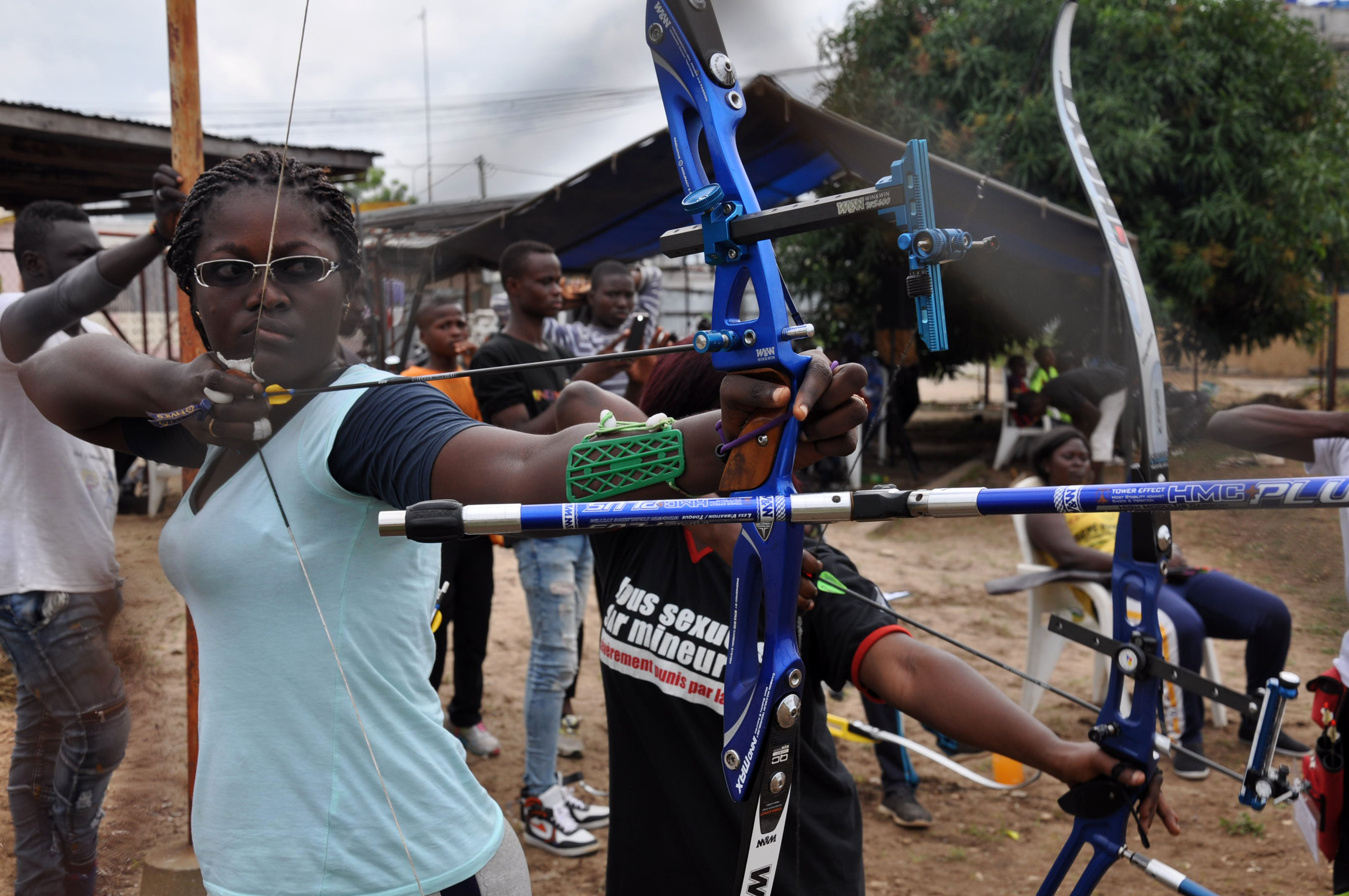
Archer in Benin

There are three main forms of aiming in archery: using a mechanical or fixed sight; instinctive aiming; and string walking.

Mechanical sights can be affixed to the bow to aid in aiming. They can be as simple as a pin, or may use optics with magnification. Modern compound bows usually also have a peep sight (rear sight) built into the string, which aids in a consistent anchor point, but this is not allowed for other bow types under World Archery. Modern compound bows automatically limit the draw length to give a consistent arrow velocity, while traditional bows allow great variation in draw length. Some bows use mechanical methods to make the draw length consistent. Barebow archers often use a sight picture, which includes the target, the bow, the hand, the arrow shaft and the arrow tip, as seen at the same time by the archer. With a fixed "anchor point" (where the string is brought to, or close to, the face), and a fully extended bow arm, successive shots taken with the sight picture in the same position fall on the same point. This lets the archer adjust aim with successive shots to achieve accuracy.

Modern archery equipment usually includes sights. Instinctive aiming is used by many archers who use traditional bows. The two most common forms of a non-mechanical release are split-finger and three-under. Split-finger aiming requires the archer to place the index finger above the nocked arrow, while the middle and ring fingers are both placed below. Three-under aiming places the index, middle, and ring fingers under the nocked arrow. This technique allows the archer to better look down the arrow since the back of the arrow is closer to the dominant eye, and is commonly called "gun barreling" (referring to common aiming techniques used with firearms). A technique called "string walking" varies the location of the fingers on the string, moving them a measured distance below the nock (based on the distance of the target), while keeping the draw hand at a fixed anchor point. In competitions with traditional classes, this is typically not permitted; those styles typically require the forefinger to be touching the arrow, either above or below it as described above.

When using short bows or shooting from horseback, it is difficult to use the sight picture. The archer may look at the target, but without including the weapon in the field of accurate view. Aiming then involves hand-eye coordination—which includes proprioception and motor-muscle memory, similar to that used when throwing a ball. With sufficient practice, such archers can normally achieve good practical accuracy for hunting or for war. Aiming without a sight picture may allow more rapid shooting, not however increasing accuracy.

=== Instinctive or intuitive shooting ===
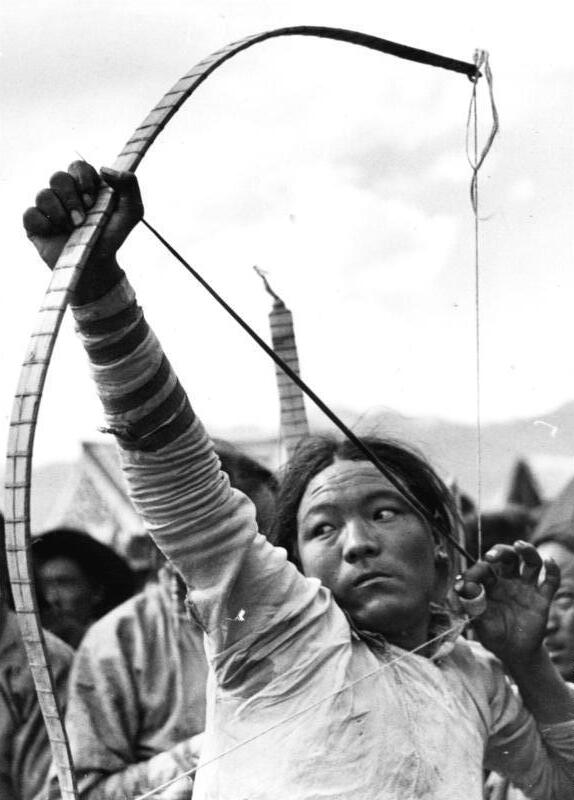
Tibetan archer, 1938

Instinctive shooting is a style of shooting that includes the barebow aiming method that relies heavily upon the subconscious mind, proprioception, and motor/muscle memory to make aiming adjustments; the term used to refer to a general category of archers who did not use a mechanical or fixed sight. In other words, it is shooting "by feel."

=== Gap shooting ===
Gap shooting is an aiming method used by instinctive shooters. It involves consciously focusing on the tip of the arrow while maintaining awareness of the target. The archer must adjust the arrow's trajectory by gauging the distance between the arrow tip and the target, ensuring accurate shots.

== Physics ==
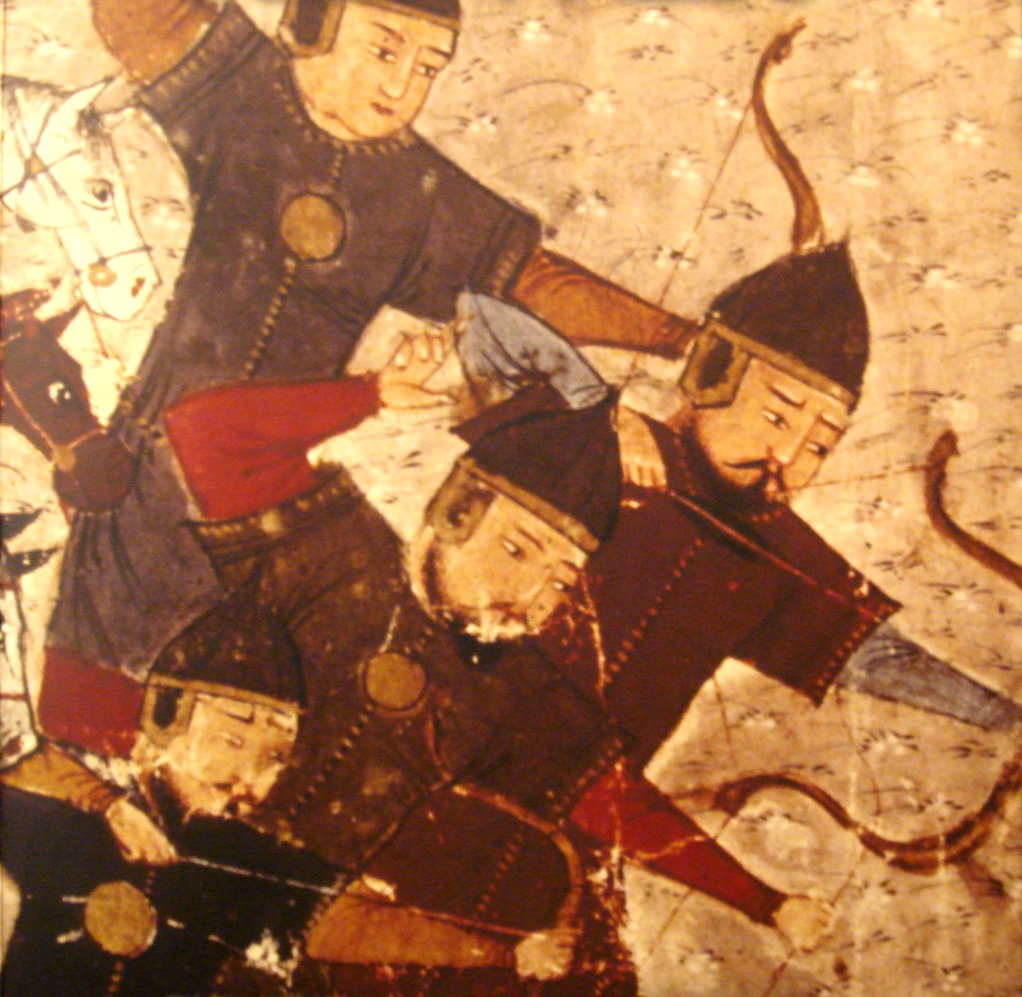
Mongol archers during the time of the Mongol conquests used a smaller bow suitable for horse archery. BnF. MS. Supplément Persan 1113. 1430–1434 AD.

When a projectile is thrown by hand, the speed of the projectile is determined by the kinetic energy imparted by the thrower's muscles performing work. However, the energy must be imparted over a limited distance (determined by arm length) and therefore (because the projectile is accelerating) over a limited time. As such, the limiting factor is not work but rather power, which determines how much energy can be added in the limited time available. Power generated by muscles, however, is limited by force–velocity relationship, and even at the optimal contraction speed for power production, total work by the muscle is less than half of what it would be if the muscle contracted over the same distance at slow speeds, resulting in less than 1/4 the projectile launch velocity possible without the limitations of the force–velocity relationship.

When a bow is used, the muscles are able to perform work much more slowly, resulting in greater force and greater work done. This work is stored in the bow as elastic potential energy, and when the bowstring is released, this stored energy is imparted to the arrow much more quickly than can be delivered by the muscles, resulting in much higher velocity and, hence, greater distance. This same process is employed by frogs, which use elastic tendons to increase jumping distance. In archery, some energy dissipates through elastic hysteresis, reducing the overall amount released when the bow is shot. Of the remaining energy, some is dampened both by the limbs of the bow and the bowstring. Depending on the arrow's elasticity, some of the energy is also absorbed by compressing the arrow, primarily because the release of the bowstring is rarely in line with the arrow shaft, causing it to flex out to one side. This is because the bowstring accelerates faster than the archer's fingers can open, and consequently some sideways motion is imparted to the string, and hence arrow nock, as the power and speed of the bow pulls the string off the opening fingers.

Even with a release aid mechanism some of this effect is usually experienced, since the string always accelerates faster than the retaining part of the mechanism. This makes the arrow oscillate in flight—its center flexing to one side and then the other repeatedly, gradually reducing as the arrow's flight proceeds. This is clearly visible in high-speed photography of arrows at discharge. A direct effect of these energy transfers can clearly be seen when dry firing. Dry firing refers to releasing the bowstring without a nocked arrow. Because there is no arrow to receive the stored potential energy, almost all the energy stays in the bow. Some have suggested that dry firing may cause physical damage to the bow, such as cracks and fractures—and because most bows are not specifically made to handle the high amounts of energy dry firing produces, should never be done.

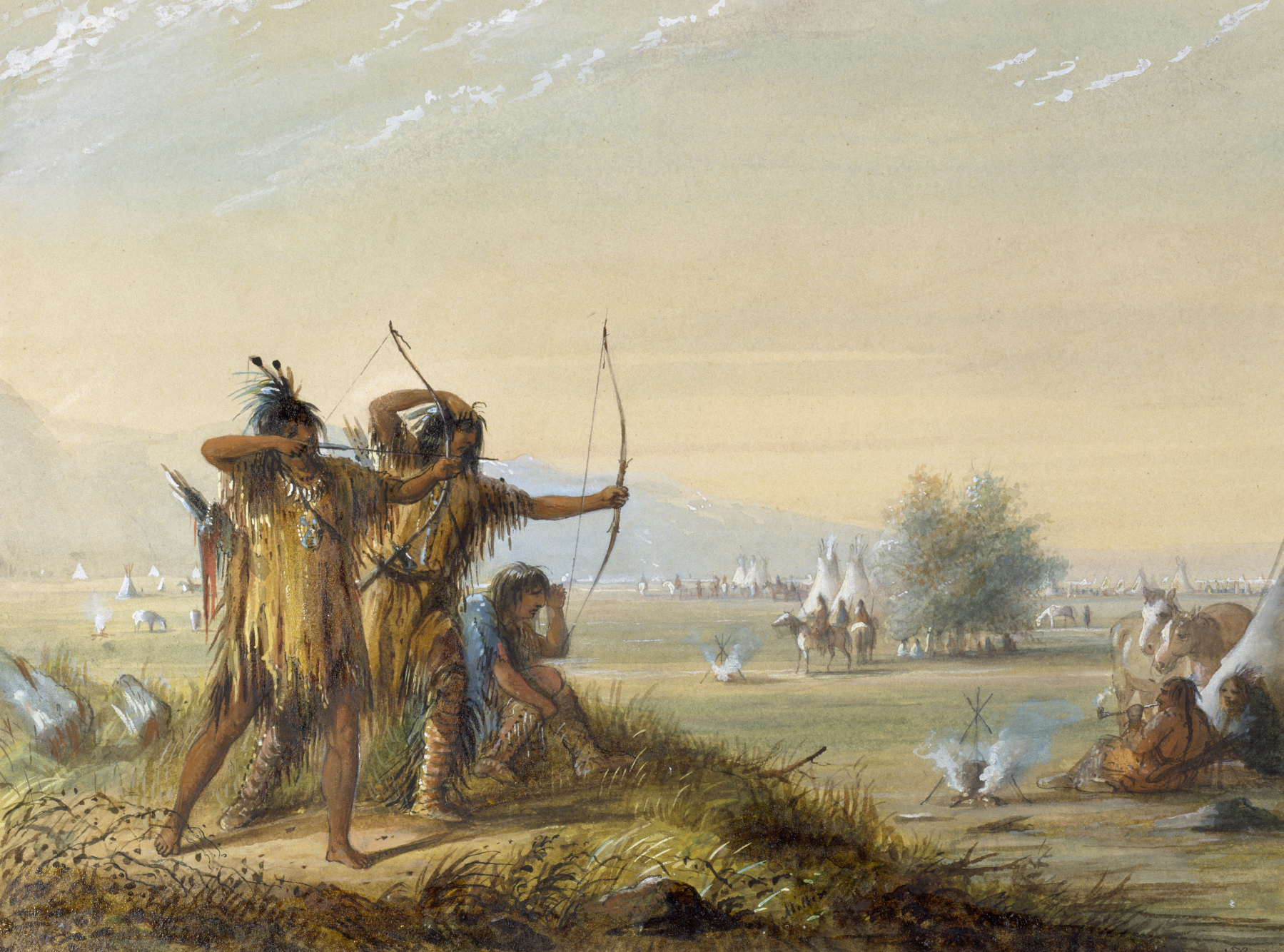
Snake Indians - testing bows, circa 1837 by Alfred Jacob Miller, the Walters Art Museum

Modern arrows are made to a specified 'spine', or stiffness rating, to maintain matched flexing and hence accuracy of aim. This flexing can be a desirable feature, since, when the spine of the shaft is matched to the acceleration of the bow(string), the arrow bends or flexes around the bow and any arrow-rest, and consequently the arrow, and fletchings, have an un-impeded flight. This feature is known as the archer's paradox. It maintains accuracy, for if part of the arrow struck a glancing blow on a part of the bow during discharge, some inconsistency would be present, and the excellent accuracy of modern equipment would not be achieved.

The accurate flight of an arrow depends on its fletchings. The arrow's manufacturer (a "fletcher") can arrange fletching to cause the arrow to rotate along its axis. This improves accuracy by evening pressure buildups that would otherwise cause the arrow to "plane" on the air in a random direction after shooting. Even with a carefully made arrow, the slightest imperfection or air movement causes some unbalanced turbulence in air flow. Consequently, rotation creates an equalization of such turbulence, which, overall, maintains the intended direction of flight i.e. accuracy. This rotation is not to be confused with the rapid gyroscopic rotation of a rifle bullet. Fletching that is not arranged to induce rotation still improves accuracy by causing a restoring drag any time the arrow tilts from its intended direction of travel.

The innovative aspect of the invention of the bow and arrow was the amount of power delivered to an extremely small area by the arrow. The huge ratio of length vs. cross sectional area, coupled with velocity, made the arrow more powerful than any other hand held weapon until firearms were invented. Arrows can spread or concentrate force, depending on the application. Practice arrows, for instance, have a blunt tip that spreads the force over a wider area to reduce the risk of injury or limit penetration. Arrows designed to pierce armor in the Middle Ages used a very narrow and sharp tip ("bodkinhead") to concentrate the force. Arrows used for hunting used a narrow tip ("broadhead") that widens further, to facilitate both penetration and a large wound.

== Hunting ==
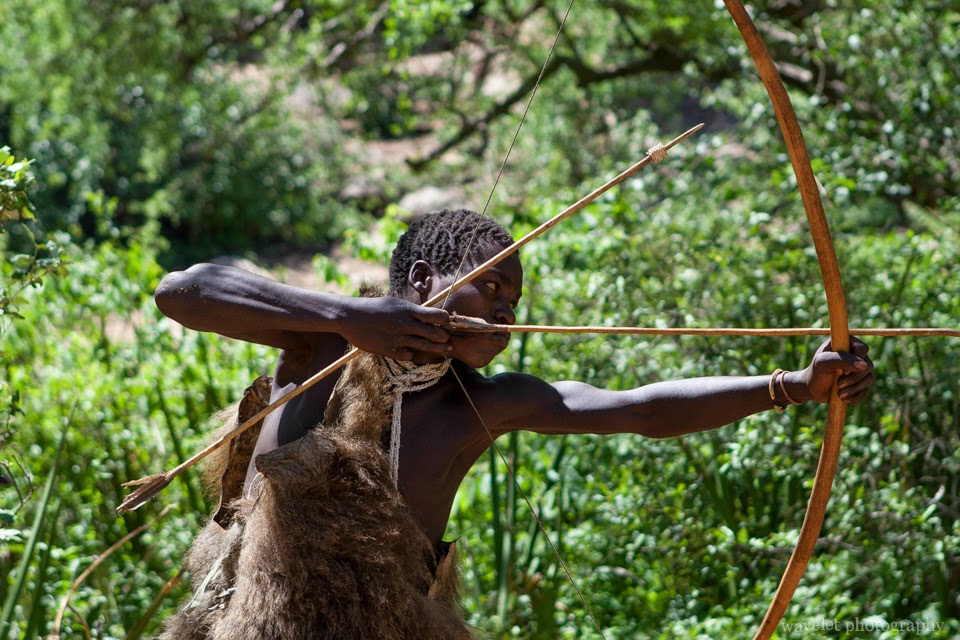
Hadza hunter-gatherer in Tanzania

Child aims bow in an after school archery program.

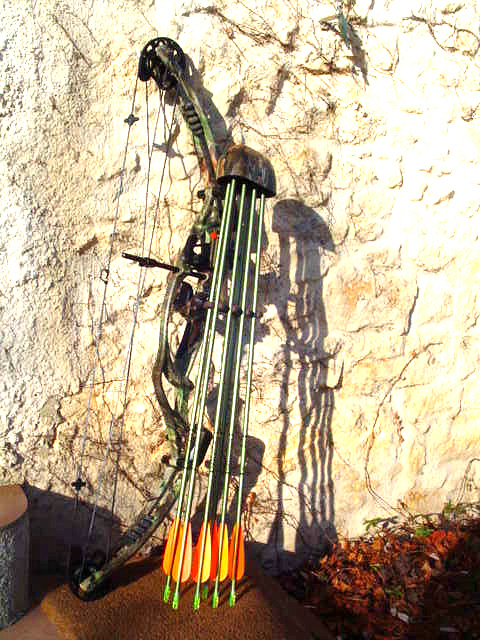
A modern compound hunting bow

Using archery to take game animals is known as "bow hunting". Bow hunting differs markedly from hunting with firearms, as distance between hunter and prey must be much shorter to ensure a humane kill. The skills and practices of bow hunting therefore emphasize very close approach to the prey, whether by still hunting, stalking, or waiting in a blind or tree stand. In many countries, including much of the United States, bow hunting for large and small game is legal. Bow hunters generally enjoy longer seasons than are allowed with other forms of hunting such as black powder, shotgun, or rifle. Usually, compound bows are used for large game hunting due to the relatively short time it takes to master them as opposed to the longbow or recurve bow. These compound bows may feature fiber optic sights, stabilizers, and other accessories designed to increase accuracy at longer distances. Using a bow and arrow to take fish is known as "bow fishing".

== Archery in schools ==
Archery is taught and run in many American schools by NASP (National Archery in the Schools Program). NASP teaches school children in America the basics of shooting, techniques, "The 11 Steps to Archery Success", bow care, and runs tournaments along with State and Nationals with eastern nationals being hosted in Louisville, Kentucky. Archery competitions usually use Morrell targetsvalues up to 10 points, but some competitions also feature 3D Archery, which involves shooting 3D animal targets.

== Modern competitive archery ==
Competitive archery involves shooting arrows at a target for accuracy from a set distance or distances. This is the most popular form of competitive archery worldwide and is called target archery. A form particularly popular in Europe and America is field archery or 3D Archery, shot at targets generally set at various distances in a wooded setting. Competitive archery in the United States is governed by USA Archery and National Field Archery Association (NFAA), which also certifies instructors.

Para archery is an adaptation of archery for athletes with a disability, governed by the World Archery (WA) and is one of the sports in the Summer Paralympic Games. There are also several other lesser-known and historical forms of archery, as well as archery novelty games and flight archery, where the aim is to shoot the greatest distance.

== See also ==
- Arash
- Arab archery
- Archery Association of India
- 3D Archery
- Bow and arrow
- Bow draw
- Bowfishing
- Hunting
- Bowhunting
- Game (hunting)
- Big–game hunting
- Big five game
- Mukkha
- Clout archery
- Field archery
- Gungdo
- Kyūdō
- Kyūjutsu
- Longbow
- Modern competitive archery
- Mounted archery
- Run archery
- Sagittarii
- Sagittarius
- Sport of Kings
- Target archery
- Turkish archery
- List of archery terms
- List of notable archers
- Crossbow
- List of extreme and adventure sports
