= Modern competitive archery =

Sport

Modern competitive archery involves shooting arrows at a target for accuracy and precision from a set distance or distances. This is the most popular form of competitive archery worldwide and is called target archery. A form particularly popular in Europe, North America, and South America is field archery, shot at targets generally set at various distances in a wooded setting. There are also several other lesser-known and historical forms, as well as archery novelty games.

The World Archery Federation (WA, also and formerly known as FITA from the French Fédération Internationale de Tir à l'Arc), composed of 156 national federations and other archery associations, is the governing body recognized by the International Olympic Committee. Various other large organizations exist with different rules.

== Target archery ==
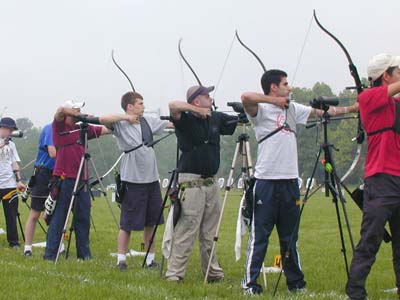
Outdoor target competition.

Modern competitive target archery is often governed by the World Archery Federation, abbreviated as WA (sometimes also referred to as FITA, from its former French name of Fédération Internationale de Tir à l'Arc). Olympic rules are derived from WA rules.

Target archery competitions may be held indoors or outdoors. Indoor distances are 18 m (20 yards). Outdoor distances range from 25 to 90 m (27 to 98 yards). Competition is divided into ends of 3 or 6 arrows. After each end, the competitors walk to the target to score and retrieve their arrows. Archers have a set time-limit in which to shoot their arrows. 3 arrows are shot in 2 minutes, and 6 in 4 minutes.

Targets are marked with 10 evenly spaced concentric rings, which have score values from 1 through 10 assigned to them. In addition, there is an inner 10 ring, sometimes called the X ring. This becomes the 10 ring at indoor compound competitions. Outdoors, it serves as a tiebreaker with the archer scoring the most X's winning. Archers score each end by summing the scores for their arrows. Line breakers, an arrow just touching a scoring boundary line, will be awarded the higher score.

In the past, most targets in competitive archery used some kind of stalks of grain or grass and might be constructed of marsh grass woven into a rope, then wrapped around into a target. However, in modern times, most archery targets are made of synthetic foam, or woven plastic bags stuffed with cloth.

Different rounds and distances use different size target faces. These range from 40 cm (16 in) (18 m [20 yd] WA Indoor) to 122 cm (48 in) (70 m [77 yd] and 90 m [98 yd] WA, used in Olympic competition).

== Field archery ==
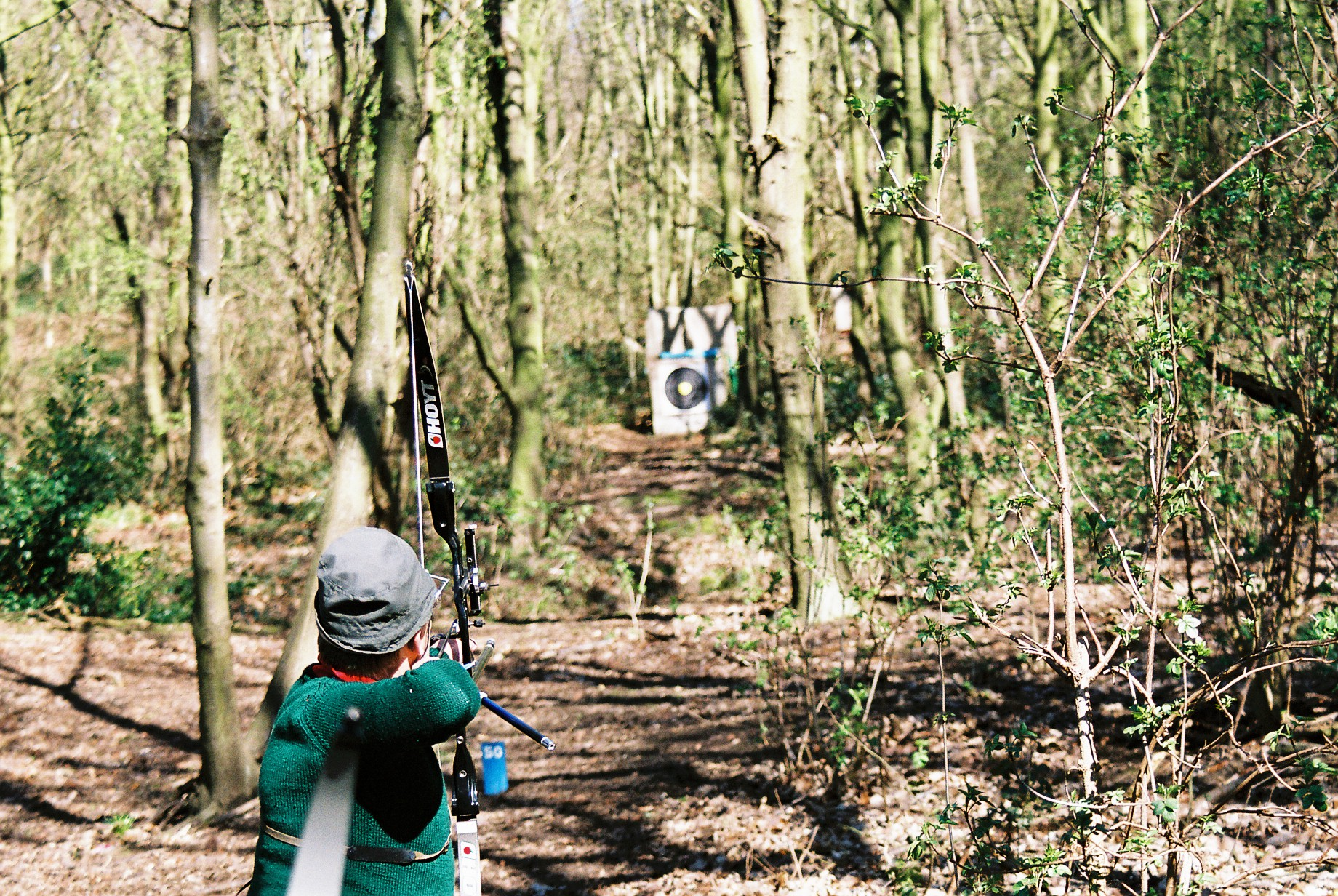
A field archer shooting freestyle recurve at 60 m (66 yards).

Field archery involves shooting at targets of varying (and sometimes unmarked) distance, often in rough terrain.

Three common types of rounds (in the NFAA) are the field, hunter, and animal. A round consists of 28 targets in two units of 14 (until the early 60's two rounds of 28 were shot for 56 targets). Field rounds are at 'even' distances up to 80 yards (73 m) (some of the shortest are measured in feet instead), using targets with a black bullseye (5 points), a white center (4) ring, and black outer (3) ring. Hunter rounds use 'uneven' distances up to 70 yards (64 m), and although scoring is identical to a field round, the target has an all-black face with a white bullseye. Children and youth positions for these two rounds are closer, no more than 30 and 50 yards (27 and 46 m), respectively. Animal rounds use life-size 2D animal targets with 'uneven' distances reminiscent of the hunter round. The rules and scoring are also significantly different. The archer begins at the first station of the target and shoot their first arrow. If it hits, they do not have to shoot again. If it misses, they advance to station two and shoots a second arrow, then to station three for a third if needed. Scoring areas are vital (20, 16, or 12) and nonvital (18, 14, or 10) with points awarded depending on which arrow scored first. Again, children and youth shoot from reduced range.

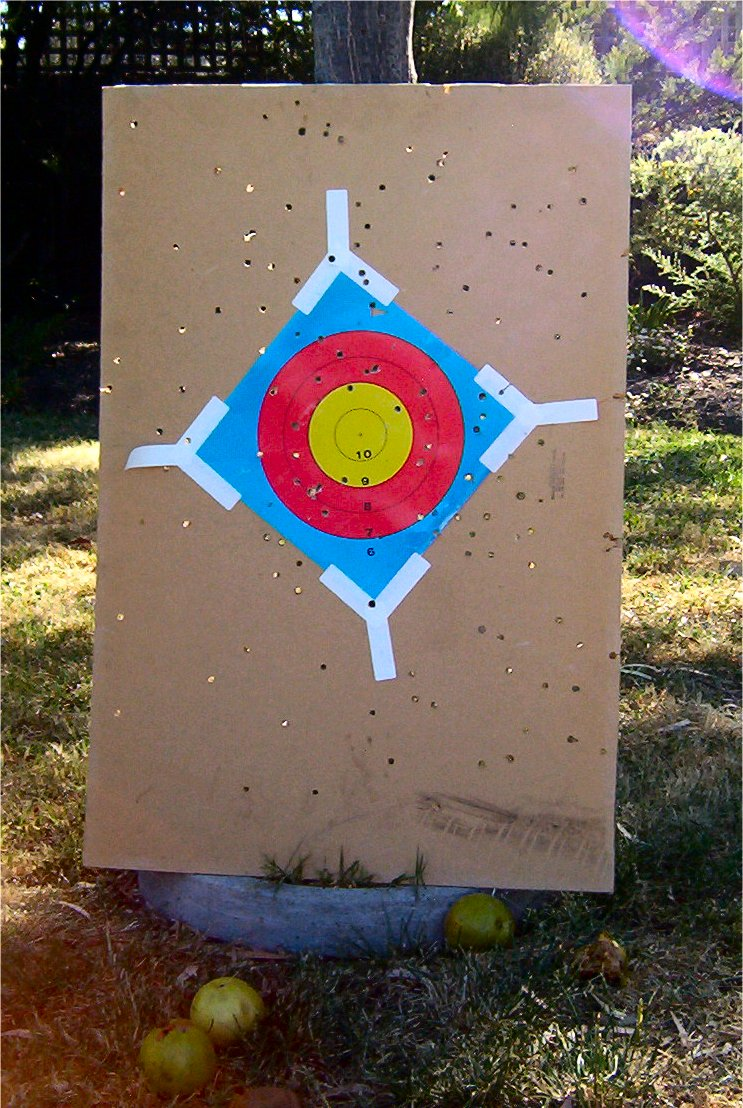
A home-made Archery target

One goal of field archery is to improve the technique required for bowhunting in a more realistic outdoor setting, but without introducing the complication and guesswork of unknown distances. As with golf, fatigue can be an issue as the athlete walks the distance between targets across sometimes rough terrain.

IFAA Field and International rounds are used in European Professional Archery competition.

== Other modern competitions ==
The following are listed on the World Archery website. These competitions are not as popular as the two listed above, but they are competed internationally.

=== 3D archery ===
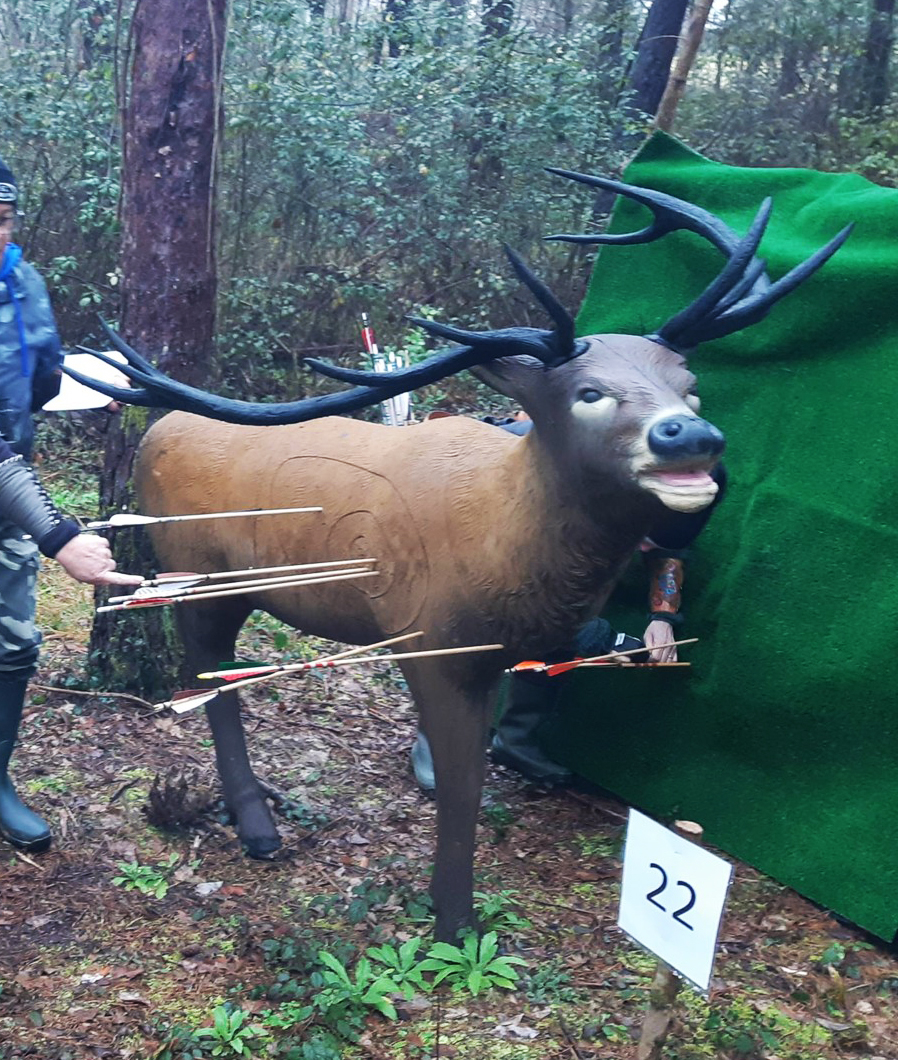
archery 3D rubber silhouette of a deer hit by arrows

3D archery is a subset of field archery focusing on shooting at life-size models of game. It requires walking along a path through vegetation with shooting ranges, it's also popular with those seeking a realistic and natural setting. Furthermore, the targets are made of rubber, making it an animal-friendly sport. Unlike field archery, distances are almost always unknown, and you need to hit the target in specific points that are much less visible than the concentric colored rings.

So although the original focus was on hunting, the discipline of offering shooting ranges surrounded by vegetation, with silhouettes that recreate a natural environment, is increasingly catering to non-hunters as well. Broadheads are not used to avoid excessive damage to the foam targets; instead, regular target or field broadheads of the same weight as the broadhead are used.

Over the past decade, 3D archery has become increasingly competitive. Competitions are held across many U.S. states, with scores from each state combined to determine an overall winner in each division. Some competitors travel thousands of miles (or kilometres) each year to compete for world titles. This style of competition has also expanded to many other countries and continues to gain popularity.

The major 3D archery groups are the IBO (International Bowhunting Organization) and the ASA (American Shooters Association) are primarily based in Eastern United States. They each have different rules and scoring methods. They host a number of competitive shoots across the Eastern United States. There are several classes in each organization that range from hunter all the way up to professional classes. Each class shoots at maximum yardages that vary by class. At a global level, World Archery coordinates around 160 national federations that organize continental 3D archery events and the World 3D Archery Championships takes place every two years.

=== Clout archery (G.N.A.S. rules in the United Kingdom) ===
Archers shooting clout.

Similar to target archery, except that the archer attempts to drop arrows at long range (180 yards or 160 metres for the men and 140 yards or 130 metres for women; there are shorter distances for juniors depending on age) into a group of concentric circular scoring zones on the ground surrounding a marker flag. Traditional clout archery, up to Elizabethan times, was shot at 'twelve score', 240 yards (220 m). The flag is 12 inches (30 cm) square and is fixed to a stick. The flag should be as near to the ground as is practicable. Archers shoot 'ends' of six arrows then, when given the signal to do so, archers proceed to the target area. A Clout round usually consists of 36 arrows. Clout tournaments are usually a 'Double Clout' round (36 arrows shot twice). They can be shot in one direction (one way) or both directions (two way). All bow types may compete (longbows, recurve, barebow and compound).

- Scoring. A 'rope' with a loop on the end is placed over the flag stick. This rope is divided into the scoring zones of the target: Gold (5 points), Red (4 points), Blue (3 points), Black (2 points) and White (1 point). The rope is 'walked' around the target area and arrows falling within a particular scoring zone are withdrawn and, on completion of the full circle, are laid out on the rope on the corresponding colours. The designated scorer would then call out the archers' names and the archers would (in turn) call out their scores as they pick up their arrows. The scores must be called in descending order as with target archery.

=== Crossbow archery (IAU rules internationally) ===
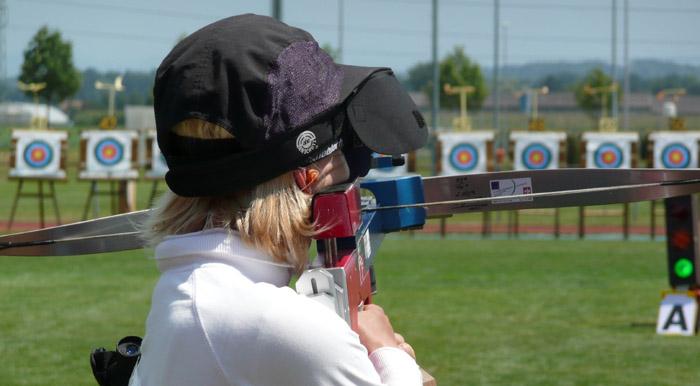
IAU 'Field' crossbow archery

The International Crossbow-shooting Union (Internationale Armbrustschutzen Union – IAU) was founded in Landshut, Germany, on June 24, 1956, as the world governing body for crossbow target shooting. The IAU supervises World, Continental and International crossbow shooting championships in 3 disciplines; 30 m (33 yd) Match-crossbow, 10 m (11 yd) Match-crossbow and Field-crossbow archery. IAU World Championships take place every two years with Continental Championships on intervening years. Other International and IAU-Cup events take place annually.

Field-crossbow archery was first adopted by the IAU during their General Assembly at Frütigen, Switzerland in 1977. Since then the sport has become the most popular, in terms of worldwide activity, of the IAU's three target crossbow disciplines. A feature of this sport is that many crossbow archers make their own equipment. By following the detailed guidelines issued by the IAU's Technical Committee it is possible to construct a field crossbow from locally available archery materials and target shooting accessories. The IAU's Field regulations call for the wearing of light-weight sports clothing, thereby eliminating the need for specialized (and costly) shooting clothing. Shooting takes place on open sports fields or in sports halls using portable archery target buttresses, once again avoiding the need for the expense of permanent shooting ranges (subject to IAU and local safety regulations being met).

Crossbow archers shoot from the standing position and they must draw the bow string by hand without mechanical assistance. At outdoor competitions Bolts (arrows) are shot in "ends" (series) of three at multi-coloured 10-zone archery target faces. A time limit of three minutes is allowed per three shots. After a sound signal from the official in charge of shooting, all competitors walk forward together to score and collect their bolts from the targets. This sequence is repeated until the completion of the competition 'round'.

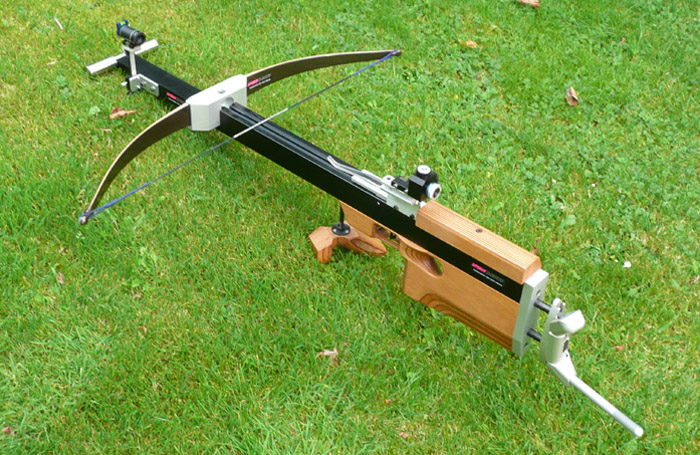
A typical Field-crossbow

Equipment – Field-crossbows are designed to specifications laid-down by the International Crossbow-shooting Union (IAU). These rules limit the power, weight and physical dimensions of equipment for use in archery-style competition. Other restrictions include the use of mechanical triggers and open sights only. The bowstring has to be drawn by hand without the use of mechanical assistance. The materials used in construction include laminated hardwoods, aluminium alloy and composites. The prod, or bow, is usually made from laminated carbon-fibre or glass-fibre which is fitted with a bowstring made from synthetic fibres. The maximum permitted draw weight is 43 kg (95 lb) at a maximum power stroke of 30 cm (12 in). Shooting a 20 grams (310 grains) bolt this set up will generate an initial velocity of around 67 m/s (240 km/h; 150 mph). Field crossbow bolts are made from tubular aluminium or carbon-fibre archery shaft materials.

The majority of the crossbows used in this sport are custom made in small quantities, often by the archers themselves.

IAU Championships Timeline – 1958 1st European Match-crossbow Championships Gent Belgium, 1979 1st World Match-crossbow Championships Linz Austria, 1982 1st World Field-crossbow Championships Mikkeli Finland, 1989 1st European Field-crossbow Championships Wolverhampton England, 1992 1st Asian Field-crossbow Championships Tainan Taiwan ROC.

=== Flight archery ===
Shooting a specialised compound flight bow.

In flight archery, the aim is to shoot the greatest distance; accuracy or penetrating power are not relevant. It requires a large flat area such as an aerodrome; the Ottoman Empire established an "arrow field" (Ok-Meidan) in Istanbul and there were others in several major cities. Turkish flight archery astonished early modern Europeans, whose wooden longbows and heavy arrows had much shorter maximum ranges; in 1795, Mahmoud Effendi, a secretary at the Turkish Embassy in London, made a shot of 482 yards (441 m) on Finsbury Fields, and reportedly apologised for an indifferent performance by Turkish standards.

Modern rules have flight archers shooting in various classes and weights. Generally they shoot six arrows at each "end" and then search for all of them. Only four ends are usual in one shoot (as per UK rules – in the US only one end is permitted). At the end of the shoot, archers stay by or mark their furthest arrows while judges and their assistants measure the distances achieved.

Flight archery relies on the finest in performance equipment, optimized for the single purpose of greater range, using various types of bows (some unusual such as foot bows). The search for better flight archery equipment has led to many developments in archery equipment in general, such as the development of carbon arrows. Flight archery arrows are highly specialized. They are very short (Mahmoud Effendi's was only 14 inches [36 cm]), so that the point of the arrow is inside the arc of the fully drawn bow, requiring a support projecting back from the bow towards the archer to keep the arrow in position, or the use of a 'siper' (Turkish) on the bow hand/wrist on which to rest the arrow. Also, the shafts are 'barrelled', tapering towards both ends from the middle, to reduce both weight and air resistance.

=== Ski archery ===
An event very similar to the sport of biathlon except a recurve bow is used in place of a gun. The athletes ski around a cross-country track and there are two stances in which the athlete must shoot the targets: kneeling and standing. During competition the skis may not be removed at any time. The athlete may unfasten the ski when shooting in the kneeling position but must keep the foot in contact with the ski. The shooting distance is 18 m (20 yards) and the targets 16 cm (6 inches) in diameter. In certain events, for every missed target, the athlete must ski one penalty loop. The loop is 150 m (160 yards) long. In summer or regions with little snow, the European run archery is a mentionable alternative.

=== Traditional competitions ===
The following are not listed on the WA website but are competitions that have a long tradition in their respective countries.

==== Korean archery ====
Korean traditional archery with modernized rule set from 1928. Archers shoot 5 arrow for each 'Soon' and each contest is usually consist of 9 Soon. The target is 2m wide, 2.667m high, 145m away from shooting line. The score is counted if the arrow hits any part of the target. A bow with modern material is allowed for lower level of archers however higher level of archers who have officially recorded more than 30 hit out of 45 arrow need to use a bow and arrow made with traditional material such as sinew, horn and bamboo. In official event, it is only allowed to use a bow that is approved by Korean national archery association which is governing body of the rule set and most traditional archery range. There is limited amount of target in the range due to the clearance issue between target and space limitation therefore archers in line shoot in turn from the left.

==== Beursault ====
A traditional northern French and Belgian archery contest. Archers teams shoot alternately at two targets facing each other, 50 m (55 yards) away. A perpendicular array of wooden walls secures a path parallel to the shooting range. After each round, the archers take their own arrow and shoot directly in the opposite direction (thus having opposite windage). One always shoots the same arrow, supposedly the best built, as it was difficult in medieval times to have constant arrow quality. The round black-and-white target mimics the size of a soldier: its diameter is shoulder-wide, the center is heart-sized.

==== Popinjay (or Papingo) ====
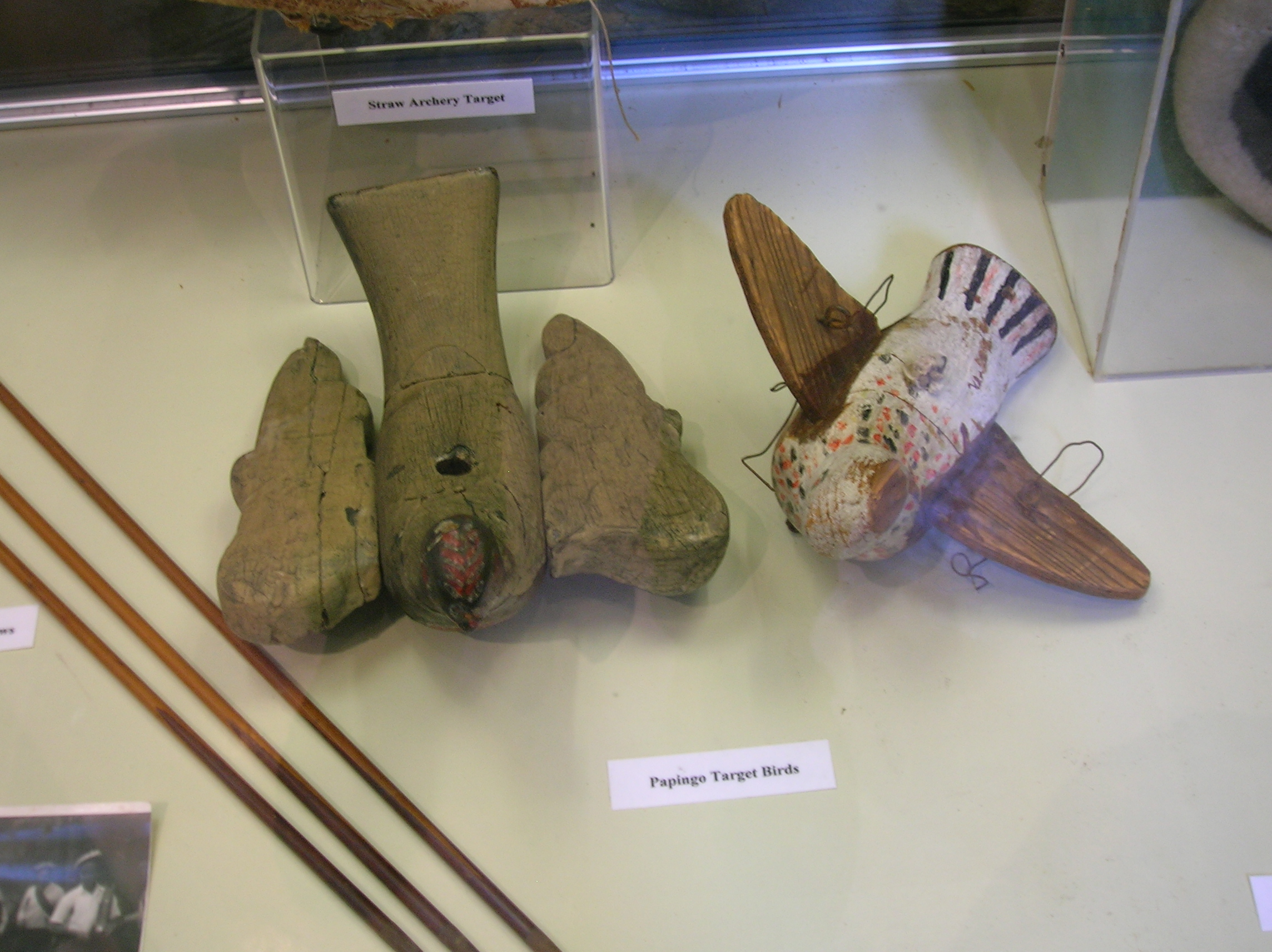
Two papingos in the Kilwinning Abbey tower museum, Scotland.

A form of archery originally derived from shooting birds on church steeples. Popinjay is popular in Belgium, and in Belgian Clubs internationally but little known elsewhere. Traditionally, archers stand within 12 feet (3.7 m) of the bottom of a 90 feet (27 m) mast and shoot almost vertically upwards with 'blunts' (arrows with rubber caps on the front instead of a point), and 'flu-flu' fletchings (very large, wound round the shaft to quickly reduce speed and distance of flight) the object being to dislodge any one of a number of wooden 'birds'. These birds must be one Cock, four Hens, and a minimum of twenty-four Chicks. A Cock scores 5 points when hit and knocked off its perch; a Hen, 3; and a Chick, 1 point. A horizontal variation with Flemish origins also exists and is also practiced in Canada and the United States

A Papingo is also hosted during the summer in Scotland by the Ancient Society of Kilwinning Archers. The archers shoot at a wooden bird suspended from the steeple of Kilwinning Abbey. Here only one bird is the target, and the archers take it in turn to shoot with a longbow until the "bird" is shot down.

==== Roving marks ====
Roving marks is the oldest form of competitive archery, as practiced by Henry VIII. The archers will shoot to a "mark" then shoot from that mark to another mark. A mark is a post or flag to be aimed at. As with clout a rope or ribbon is used to score the arrows. In the Finsbury Mark the scoring system is 20 for hitting the mark, 12 for within ~3 ft (0.91 m), 7 points for within the next ~6 ft (1.8 m) and 3 points for within the next ~9 ft (2.7 m). "Hoyles" are marks that are chosen at the time from the variety of debris, conspicuous weeds, and so on found in most outdoor areas. As the distances have to be estimated this is good practice for bowhunting, and it requires minimal equipment.

==== Wand shoot ====
A traditional English archery contest. Archers take turns shooting at a vertical strip of wood, the wand, usually about six feet (1.8 m) high and three to six inches (7.6 to 15.2 cm) wide. Points are awarded for hitting the strip. As the target is a long vertical strip this competition allows for more errors in elevation, however since no points are awarded for near misses the archer's windage accuracy becomes more important. The wand shoot is, in some respects, similar to the traditional Cherokee game of cornstalk shooting.

=== Other competitions ===
Archers often enjoy adding variety to their sport by shooting under unusual conditions or by imposing other special restrictions or rules on the event. These competitions are often less formalized and are more or less considered as games. Some forms include the broadhead round, bionic and running bucks, darts, archery golf, night shooting, and turkey tester.

=== Historical reenactment ===
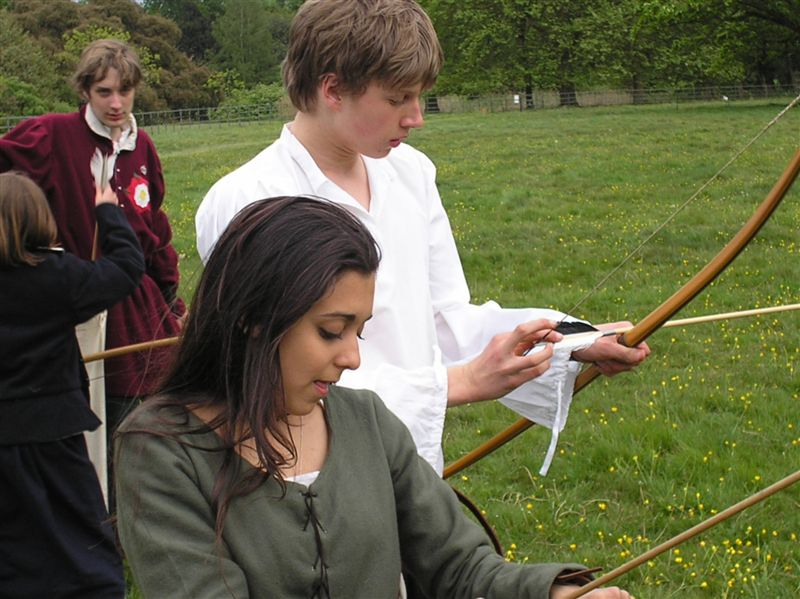
Four reenactors practice Tudor-style 'Skirmish' archery

Archery is popularly used in historical reenactment events. This sort of event usually combines education of the audience about aspects of archery (such as the bow, arrows, and practice drill), combined with a demonstration or competition of archery in the style most favored by the period on display, generally in period costume.

=== Archery education ===
A relatively new program has developed in U.S. schools called the National Archery in the Schools Program (NASP). In this students use Genesis bows (a compound-style bow without a let-off, made by a subsidiary of major bow manufacturer Mathews Archery). Students or teams who want to can also go to state and national tournaments to compete against other schools. NASP was formed in 2001 as the Kentucky Archery in the Schools Program, with the state's Departments of Education and Fish and Wildlife Resources teaming with Mathews Archery. The program was formally launched in 2002 in 21 middle schools, with a stated goal of enrolling 120 schools within 3 years. This goal was reached within the program's first year, and interest from other states led to the state's name being replaced by "National". As of 2023, NASP lists program coordinators in the following jurisdictions:

- All U.S. states except Delaware, Vermont, and Wyoming. The program also operates in Washington, D.C.
- All Canadian provinces except New Brunswick and Québec.
- Australia, the British Virgin Islands, Mongolia, and New Zealand. In addition, while no coordinator is listed for South Africa, NASP states that the country's existing hunter education program, which has long been involved with schools, uses the NASP program.

Many sportsman's clubs and similar establishments throughout the US and other countries offer archery education programs for those 20 and younger. These programs are commonly referred to as Junior Olympic Archery Development Programs, or simply JOAD. There are over 250 JOAD Clubs recognized by USA Archery. 4-H is also offering archery as an activity for those under 18. Usually members have to have certain requirements for the bows they shoot (ex. use a Genesis Bow, no sights, no mechanical release aids, etc.). Members of archery 4-H clubs and those who use archery as their project can compete in target archery and field archery competitions.

== Archery with humans as targets, or very near the target ==
Demonstrations of archery skill are sometimes featured as entertainment in circuses or Wild West shows. Sometimes these acts feature a performer acting as a human "target" (strictly speaking they are not the target as the objective of the archer is to narrowly miss them, however they are frequently referred to as human targets). Archery in this context is sometimes known as one of the "impalement arts", a category which also includes knife throwing and sharpshooting demonstrations. Apache boys were trained to protect themselves by giving them a shield and having several warriors shoot at them with blunt arrows, which can still do severe damage.

In some recreational groups, a form of archery known as combat archery is practiced, where several archers divided into "lights" and "heavies", namely those wearing armour or not, shoot at each other with cushion-tipped arrows from low-powered longbows, with a maximum draw-weight of 30 lb (14 kg). The rules of combat archery dictate that no archer may shoot at a light, however all may shoot at a heavy. Combat archery can be an interesting challenge for participants, as it involves shooting at moving targets, and can be used to re-create battles. In Australia, it is more common for 'lights' to wear enough protection that they can shoot at each other as well.

There is a strict separation between archery practised as a competitive sport and archery as an impalement art. For example, organising bodies for competitive archery prohibit activity that involves deliberate shooting in the general direction of a human being. The separation between the worlds of competition archery and the impalement arts is more marked than that between, for example, knife throwing as a sport and as an entertainment. While some competition knife throwers have also performed circus acts and there are official organisations that embrace both worlds, there is little or no evidence of such crossover in archery, with perhaps the sole exception of reenactment groups (e.g. Society for Creative Anachronism), where archers can both compete in a tournament (target archery) and participate in combat archery, shooting with light bows and special safety arrows at well armoured warriors (often knights).

However archery involving a person in the vicinity of the target is a particularly dangerous practice and, even with very experienced performers, there have been cases of very serious injury.

Another situation where archery features as an entertainment is in its portrayal in movies. Howard Hill used his extraordinary accuracy for the archery in the movie The Adventures of Robin Hood (1938) starring Errol Flynn. He used a heavy hunting bow to hit small reinforced target areas on the chests of actors in motion. Hill also performed stunts such as shooting an apple held by a volunteer and shooting a stone as it was thrown in the air. Some of his stunts can be seen in the short film Cavalcade of Archery (1946).

== International games which include archery ==
- Summer Olympic Games
- Summer Paralympic Games
- World Games
- Asian Games
- Commonwealth Games

== See also ==
- Archery at the Summer Olympics
- Archery at the Summer Paralympics
- Archery at the World Games
- Crossbow
- Field Archery
- World Archery World Cup
- Grand National Archery Society
- Shooting Sports
- Target Archery
- Target Archery World Championships
- 2009 World Indoor Archery Championships
- World Archery (WA)
- U.S. Intercollegiate Archery Champions
