= Instinctive shooting =

Instinctive shooting may refer to:

- Point shooting, is a practical shooting method where the shooter points a ranged weapon (typically a repeating firearm)
- Instinctive shooting (archery), also known as intuitive shooting, is a method used in archery to shoot an arrow by exploiting the brain's ability to analyze, without our realizing it, the three-dimensional space between us and the target
