= Turkish archery =

Tradition of archery which became highly developed in the Ottoman Empire

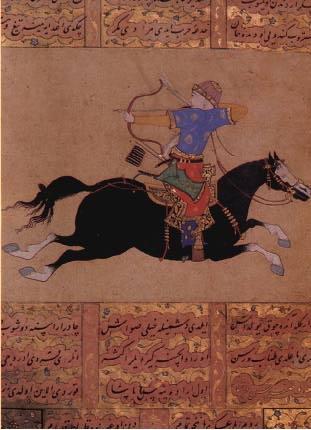
Turkish horse archer.

Turkish archery (Turkish: Türk okçuluğu) is a traditional form of archery which became highly developed in the Ottoman Empire, although its origins date back to the Eurasian Steppe in the second millennium BC.

Traditional Turkish archery has been inscribed on the Representative list of the Intangible Cultural Heritage of Humanity by the Intergovernmental Committee for the Safeguarding of Intangible Cultural Heritage of UNESCO in 2019.

== History ==
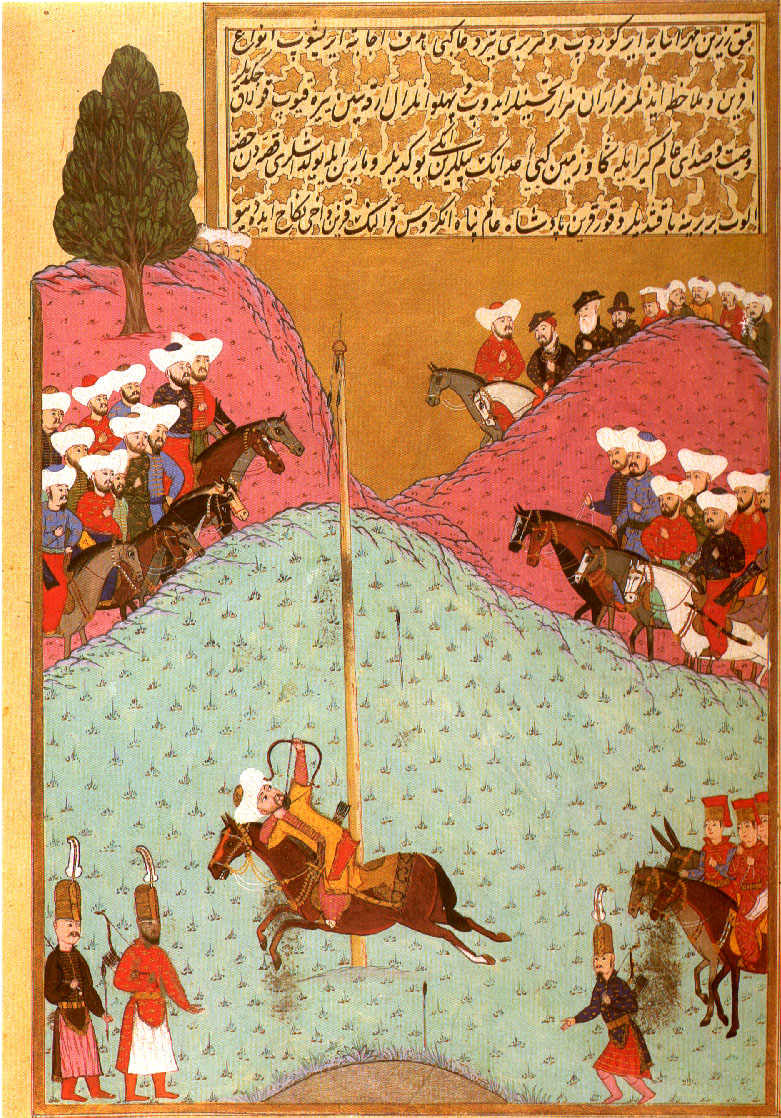
Sultan Murad II at archery practice.

From the decline of military archery after the Battle of Lepanto, mainly flight archery was practiced, and Turkish bowyers specialized in weapons which were particularly good for imparting high velocity to very light arrows. The sport of archery declined gradually until the reign of Mahmud II who made great efforts to revive it. He also ordered his archery student, Mustafa Kani, to write a book about the history, construction, and use of these bows, from which comes most of what is now known of Turkish bowyery. In 1794, in a field outside London, the Turkish ambassador's secretary used a Turkish bow and arrow to shoot 415 yards, partially against the wind, and 482 yards with the wind. He said on a plain near Constantinople pillars were located that commemorate distances of 800 yards achieved with Turkish bows and arrows in ancient times. After the death of Mahmud II in 1839, archery resumed its decline. The living art of Turkish bowyery was lost in the 1930s with the death of the last bowyer and famous calligrapher, Neçmeddin Okyay; it has since been revived.

For many years the excellence of Turkish bows could be seen from historical records. In 1910 an archery contest was held on the beach at Le Touquet, France, where Ingo Simon was able to shoot an arrow 434 m using an old Turkish composite bow requiring a force of 440N or 99 lb.

== Equipment ==
=== Turkish bow ===
The Turkish bow is a recurved composite bow used in the Ottoman Empire. The construction is similar to that of other classic Asiatic composite bows, with a wooden core (maple was most desirable), animal horn on the belly (the side facing the archer), and sinew on the front, with the layers secured together with animal glue. However, several features of the Turkish bow are distinct. The curvature tends to be more extreme when the bow is unstrung, with the limbs curling forward into the shape of the letter "C". With some bows, the rigid tips of the limbs ("kasan") even touch. The grip area is not recessed like other Asianic bows and is fairly flat on the belly, while the front of the grip bulges outwards.

The dramatic curvature of the bows makes stringing them very different from straighter bows found in Europe. There is an old saying in Turkey that there are "120 ways to string a bow," though the most common methods involve sitting on ground with one's feet pressed against the grip. Heavier bows usually require the use of a long, looped strap to pull the limbs back and hold them while the string is seated.

In the modern world, the Turkish bow is now predominantly used for sporting purposes. Authentic horn and sinew bows are still made but are both extremely costly and difficult to store outside certain environments and climates. For this reason, the majority of historically styled bows of this type are made with some combination of fiberglass, hardwood (for the kasan) and resin, and with some being entirely resin.

=== Zihgir ===
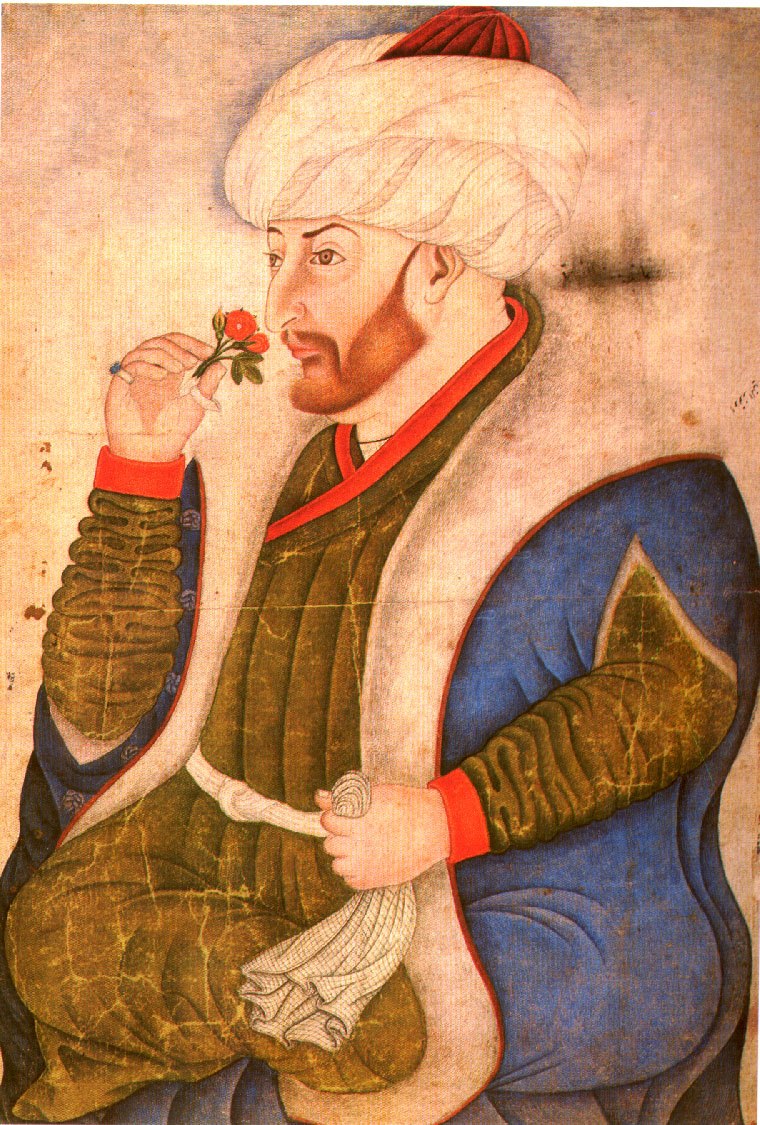
Mehmed the Conqueror with a zihgir on his right hand.

Zihgir is the Turkish word for the thumb ring used to draw the bow in the Ottoman Empire. Turkish thumb rings were made of wood, metal, ivory, bone, horn or leather. These rings signified that the person wearing them was a warrior. In time they became a symbol of prestige in Ottoman society, and some later examples have so much ornamentation on the surface from which the bowstring slides that they could not be used to shoot with. Surviving examples are often made of precious metals and richly decorated. Some are carved from precious stones.

=== Siper and Majra ===
The siper and majra are devices used to draw arrows past the bow's front limb where the arrow would normally rest. The siper is a type of shelf strapped to the archer's bow hand, which allows the archer to use arrows several inches shorter (and therefore lighter) in order to get the maximum amount of force behind the arrow. They are most commonly used for Flight Archery, to achieve the greatest distance. The Majra is a thin piece of wood with a channel cut in it and small loop for the archer's draw hand. The device allows the archer to pull back arrows that are much shorter than were intended for the bow. There is some debate among historians if this device was designed to shoot arrows that were too short for the enemy to pick up and shoot back, or if it was a way to reuse bolts fired by Chinese crossbowmen. In modern times they are primarily used in Flight Archery to shoot shorter arrows to cut down on weight.

== Technique ==
Like many other Eastern archery styles, Turkish archery uses a "thumb draw", employing a type of grip called "mandal". This grip prevents the arrow from moving if the archer is on a horse and/or firing at an unusual angle. The draw itself is relatively short, usually under the chin or by the cheek, compared to archery styles in China or Japan where the nock is pulled past the head. When the arrow is released, the draw arm is kept relatively steady rather than allowing the arm to swing backwards.

Turkish archers developed several unique techniques to aid in combat. One was the practice of holding several arrows in between the fingers of the draw hand, allowing fast repeat shots. Another technique involved drawing the bow with the draw arm going behind the head to fire at a steep downward angle. This was used to fire from atop walls down at enemy troops.

== See also ==
- Composite bow
- Mongol bow
- Gakgung
- Mounted archery
- Arab archery
- Chinese archery
- English longbow
