= Arab archery =

Style of archery

Arab archery is the traditional style of archery practiced by the Arab people of West Asia and North Africa.

== Release style ==
Arab archery described in surviving texts is similar to that used by Mongol and Turkish archers, with the use of a thumb draw and a thumb ring to protect the right thumb. Medieval Muslim writers have noted differences between Arab archery and Turkish and Iranian styles, claiming that the bow used by Hejazi Arabs was superior. From the 7th century onward, Arab archers used composite bows while shooting from foot, horseback, and camelback. They also utilized a variety of arrows, arrowheads, and shafts.

== Camel archers ==
Camels were sometimes used in combat because they were taller and more resilient in desert warfare than horses. However, this was often more for transport rather than as a platform for shooting. Camel archery is also documented among non-Arab peoples. A biblical story describes how the religious figure Joshua fought the Amalekites at Rephidim, who used camels for their archers.

== Arab archery today ==
Today, several Arab archery clubs and societies exist. The main organization is FATA, or the "Fédération Arabe de Tir à L'Arc" of Lebanon, which is a member of the World Archery Federation. Archery competitions are also a feature of the Pan Arab Games, including the 12th Arab Games held in Qatar in 2011, where 60 archers from nine Arab countries competed.

== List of Arabic works on archery ==
- al-Sarakhsi al-Harawi, Kitab fada'il al-ramy fi sabil Allah, a collection of 38 hadiths on archery
- Mardi ibn Ali al-Tarsusi, Tabsirat arbab al-albab fi kayfiyyat al-najat fi al-hurub, a general treatise on arms and armour that gives pride of place to the bow (c. 1174)
- Ahmad ibn 'Abd Allah Muhibb al-Din al-Tabari, Kirab al-wadih fi ma'rifat 'ilm al-ramy (bef. 1295)
- al-Yunini, Kitab fi ma'rifat 'ilm ramy al-siham (c. 1317–1324)
- Taybugha al-Baklamishi, Ghunyat al-tullab fi ma'rifat al-ramy bi-l-nushshab (1368/9)
- Ibn Qayyim al-Jawziyya, a treatise on Arab archery (14th century)
- Anonymous, A Book on the Excellence of the Bow and Arrow, from Morocco (c. 1350–1400)

== See also ==
- Chinese archery
- Kyūdō
- Turkish archery
- English longbow

== Bibliography ==
- Boit, Bernard A. 1991. THE FRUITS OF ADVERSITY: TECHNICAL REFINEMENTS, OF THE TURKISH COMPOSITE BOW DURING THE CRUSADING ERA. (PDF) A Thesis Presented in Partial Fulfillment of the Requirements for the degree Master of Arts in the Graduate School of the Ohio State University by Lt. Bernard A. Boit, USAF.
- Faris, Nabih Amin, and Robert Potter Elmer. Arab Archery: An Arabic Manuscript of About A.D. 1500, "A Book on the Excellence of the Bow & Arrow" and the Description Thereof. Princeton, N.J.: Princeton University Press, 1986. 182 pages. Translation of "Kitāb fī bayān fadl al-qaws w-al-sahm wa-awsāfihima," no. 793 in Descriptive catalog of the Garrett collection of Arabic manuscripts in the Princeton University library.
- Jallon, Adnan Darwish (1980). Kitāb fī maʿrifat ʿilm ramy al-sihām: A Treatise on Archery by Ḥusayn b. ʿAbd al-Raḥmān b. Muḥammad b. ʿAbdallāh al-Yūnīnī [AH 647 (?) – 724 / AD 1249–50 (?) – 1324]. A Critical Edition of the Arabic Text together with a Study of the Work in English (PhD diss.). Victoria University of Manchester.
- Latham, J. D., W. F. Paterson, and Ṭaybughā. Saracen Archery: An English Version and Exposition of a Mameluke Work on Archery (Ca. A.D. 1368). (PDF) London: Holland P., 1970.
- McLeod, Wallace E. 1962. "Egyptian Composite Bows in New York." American Journal of Archaeology. Vol. 66, No. 1 (Jan., 1962), pp. 13–19
- Paterson, W. F. 1966. "The Archers of Islam." Journal of the Economic and Social History of the Orient. Vol. 9, No. 1/2 (Nov., 1966), pp. 69–87.
- Sukenik, Yigael. 1947. "The Composite Bow of the Canaanite Goddess Anath." Bulletin of the American Schools of Oriental Research. No. 107 (Oct., 1947), pp. 11–15.
