= Run archery =

Sport combining bow shooting and running

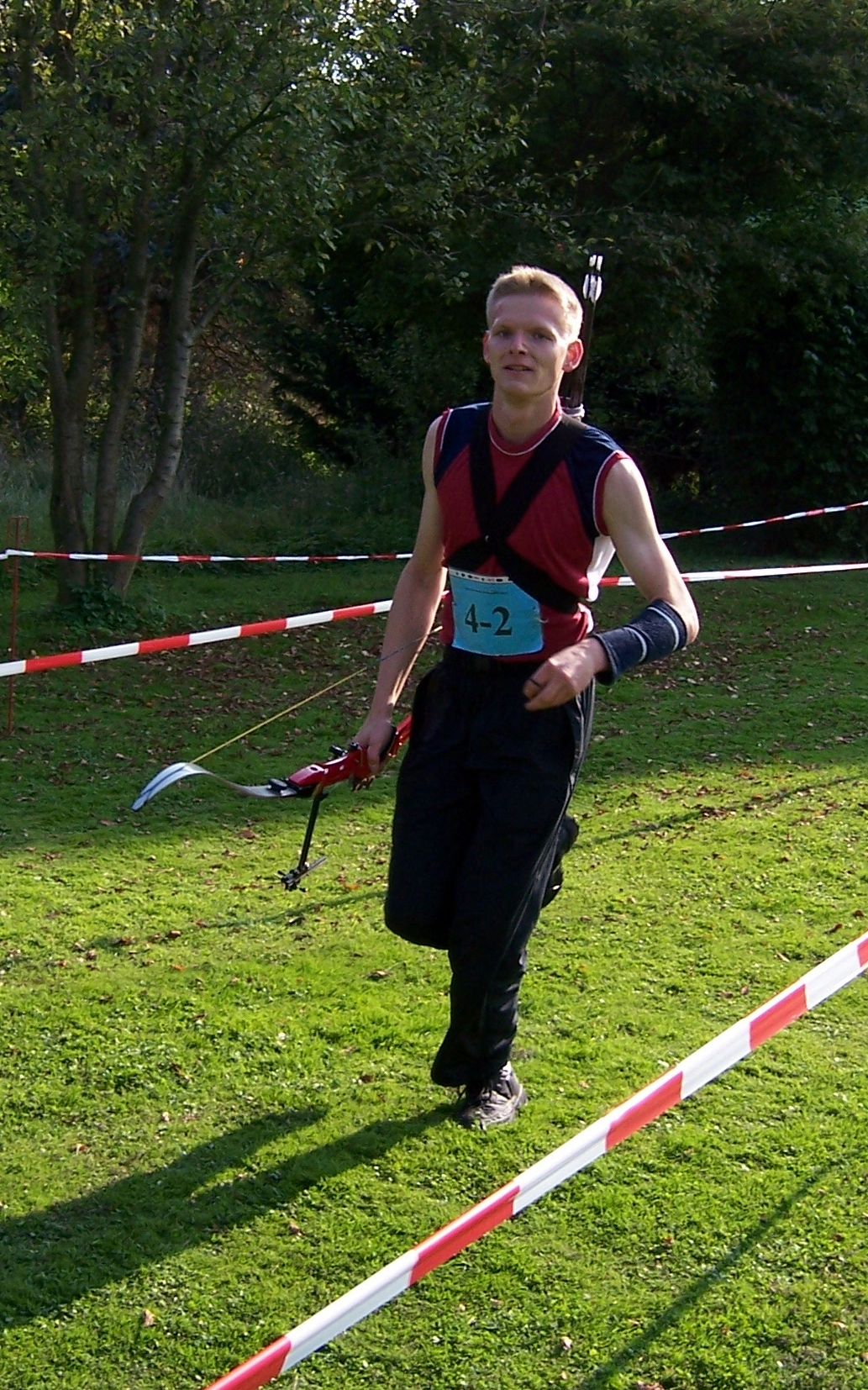
Run archer with recurve bow and back quiver during a competition

Run archery is a shooting discipline connecting archery with running. It is similar to the sport of biathlon.

== History ==
Run archery was developed during the 1990s by European archery associations. Since 2000, some countries in other areas like Russia, Hungary, the Netherlands and Germany have begun organizing annual national championships. Run archery was officially admitted as a discipline of the World Archery Federation in 2003.

== Rules ==
Like in the sport of biathlon, participants start with running, and alternate between running and shooting series of three arrows at a 16-centimetre-wide (6.3 in) target from 18 m (20 yards) away. For scoring, it does not matter whether the target is hit in the center or at the edge. For each missed target the athlete must run a penalty loop. The number of laps depend on the sport event. At the end, the fastest athlete wins. The bow must be held in hand during running; arrows can be left at the shooting range or may be carried in a back quiver.

== Sprint - 3x400m ==
Between each lap of 400 metres (440 yd), there are two shooting on 16-centimetre-wide (6.3 in) target from 18 m (20 yards), 6 arrows available to hit 4 targets per shooting.

Each missed target results in penalty loop of 60 metres (66 yd).

After the first lap of 400 metres (440 yd), there's a first shooting, the archer is up, he has 6 arrows to hit the 4 targets; then there's a second lap of 400m, a second shooting, this time the archer is kneeling, he has 6 arrows to hit the 4 targets; finishing the race with the last lap of 400m.

== 4K Individual - 4x1000m ==
Between each lap of 1,000 metres (1,100 yd), there are three shooting on 16-centimetre-wide (6.3 in) target from 18 m (20 yards), 4 arrows available to hit 4 targets per shooting.

Each missed target results in penalty loop of 150 metres (160 yd).

After the first lap of 1,000 metres (1,100 yd), there's a first shooting, the archer is up, he has 4 arrows to hit the 4 targets; then there's a second lap of 1,000m, a second shooting, this time the archer is kneeling, he has 4 arrows to hit the 4 targets; then again a third lap of 1,000m, a third shooting, the archer is back up, he has 4 arrows to hit the 4 targets; finishing the race with the last lap of 1,000m.

== Run Archery European Cup ==
Since organized by the World Archery Europe

Year	Host country	Location	Winning Nation	Men - Winner	Men - Runner-up	Men - 3rd	Women - Winner	Women - Runner-up	Women - 3rd
2019	Czech Republic	Nove Mesto Nad Metuji	Russia	Oskar Shaimuratov (RUS)	Vladislav Kiriutin (RUS)	Marco Kreische (GER)	Olga Ukolova (RUS)	Viktoria Pindurina (RUS)	Kristina Korovina (RUS)
2021	Czech Republic	Nove Mesto Nad Metuji	France	Nicolas Rifaut (FRA) Guillaume Escotte (FRA)	Tie 1st	Marco Kreische (GER)	Karolina Rezacova (CZE)	Sandra Szulc (GER)	Klara Styblova (CZE)
2022	Czech Republic	Nove Mesto Nad Metuji	Germany	Olivier Joubert (FRA)	Marco Kreische (GER)	Oran Mor (ISR)	Sandra Szulc (GER)	Klara Styblova (CZE)	Marketa Andrlova (CZE)
2023	Czech Republic	Nove Mesto Nad Metuji	France	Marco Kreische (GER)	Bryan Piscou (FRA) Olivier Joubert (FRA)	Tie 2nd	Karolina Sekmilerova (CZE)	Sandra Szulc (GER)	Karolina Rezacova (CZE)
2024	United Kingdom	Sherwood		KREISCHE Marco (GER)	CAQUERET Florian (FRA)	MATTEI Thomas (FRA)	WERNER Anica (GER)	MICHELET Gwendoline (FRA)	SZULC Sandra (GER)
2025	France	Paris		REBOUL Nathanael (FRA)	JOUBERT Olivier (FRA)	Grzegorz Chwastek (GER)	BABUSHKINA Elizaveta (AIN - Individual Neutral Athlete)	WERNER Anica (GER)	DAVIS Emma Louise (IRL)
2026	Poland								
