= Instinctive shooting (archery) =

Archery method

Instinctive shooting, also known as intuitive shooting, is a method used in archery to shoot an arrow by exploiting the brain's ability to analyze, without our realizing it, the three-dimensional space between us and the target, focusing solely on the target without using aiming devices (sights) or collimation between the target and the bow. This method is among the oldest and is used in competitions in the longbow, historical bow, and Traditional bow categories.

== Description ==
=== Instinct and shooting philosophy ===
Instinct is a behavior established by heredity, it is an organism's intrinsic tendency to perform or implement a particular behavior. In archery, it is acquired through practice, we train our body and mind to perform a movement, so the term instinctive is slightly inappropriate, while intuitive shooting might be more appropriate. The most common belief is that the only time you can make a truly instinctive shot is the very first time you shoot an arrow, subsequent arrows are an unconscious reworking of the previous arrows. However, the essentiality of the bow without gadgets, using the whole body and channeling physical and mental energy to focus on the target and perform a fluid gesture brings us back to something primitive. The more animal you are, the more you "animalize" the gesture, the more natural it comes out and the more effective it is. The best way to make the creative hemisphere of the brain function well is to forget reason and one's own ego. Archers from different places who "feel" the method can speak the same language, understand the same alchemies, and understand each other with a simple look. The common spirit or philosophy pulls even where there is no written word.

=== Preparation ===
To properly perform instinctive archery, you need to learn the basics of archery, which have been defined by years of research. This includes studying the bow grip, foot placement, torso posture, the movement required to draw the string, the position of the shoulders and arms, the point where the drawing hand lands on the face, breathing, the release of the arrow, and the reworking of the movement. This entire sequence of movements must be practiced and rehearsed until it becomes fluid and consistent. Only after mastering the movement should you focus on where the arrow is being shot, and at this point another factor comes into play: the belief that you will hit the target. The mental aspect plays a fundamental role; self-control, a positive attitude, and the inner certainty that you will hit the target are essential. Once you've mastered the basics and acquired a certain level of shooting ability, you can begin to customize your style: exhaling or inhaling using your diaphragm while shooting, tilting the bow for a better view or holding it straight, how much to bend your knees, standing straight or leaning forward, or how to position your feet are all subjective factors. The important thing is to achieve a comfortable and relaxed posture that allows you to focus all your attention on the target.

=== The instinctive shooting ===
When you want to hit a target, you need to find a precise point where you want the arrow to strike. This is a crucial step that makes all the difference: you must observe the target, identify a detail, a nuance, or even a tiny point, and concentrate on it throughout the entire movement. Nothing should distract you, and you must observe nothing else, because after much practice, the brain is able to "imagine" the parabola and calculate the correct angle of the bow based on the distance. So, once you've reached the position that instinctively or subconsciously feels optimal, you release the arrow. When the entire movement, starting from the initial observation, is performed correctly and fluidly, the archer is one with the bow. To simplify, we could compare the archer's movement to a basketball player who observes the basket and throws the ball. The first few times, it will feel like you're looking at a vast panorama with the target in the background, making sure you're performing all the steps correctly. Over time, your field of vision will narrow as your movements become automatic, until you can only see the target. At the point of maximum concentration, you'll feel like you're looking at the target in full focus through a tunnel. Once the arrow is released, the movement doesn't end, nor does the mental part. A state of will and surrender is entered, with one half of the archer continuing to push the bow while the other half relaxes the hand that was drawing the string. One observes the arrow fly, making impact, and the action ends only after reflecting on the entire gesture.

== Similar methods ==
=== Split vision ===
"Split vision" means separate vision and involves using peripheral vision to be aware of the arrowhead while keeping your gaze fixed on the target. Essentially, we see the arrow out of focus in the field of vision that keeps the target in focus. American Howard Hill used this method, which is sometimes mistaken for instinctive shooting because it's very similar.

=== Gap shooting ===
From "Gap," meaning "gap," the archer must mentally calculate the distance to the target, focus the bow window and the arrowhead, aim a point on the bow at the target, and use the arrowhead to direct the trajectory. In this case, the shot is more thoughtful and less "instinctive," but it can be useful when our "0" point coincides with the target.

=== Point of aim ===
"Point of aim" or "false aim," very similar to the previous one, requires the archer to mentally calculate the distance to the target, focus the arrowhead, and position it on a reference point on the ground. This method is also more thoughtful but often used in repeated shooting, such as indoors.
