= Ottaviano (name) =

- Pronunciation: Italian: [ottaˈvjaːno]
- Gender: masculine
- Language: Italian
- Name day: 20 November

Other gender
- Feminine: Ottaviana

Origin
- Language: Latin
- Derivation: Octavius (from octavus 'eighth [child]') + -anus
- Meaning: 'descendant of Octavius'

Ottaviano is a masculine Italian given name derived from the Latin Octavianus, and a patronymic surname.

== People with the given name ==
- Alessandro Ottaviano de' Medici (1535–1605), Italian pope with the name Leo XI
- Ottaviano Andriani (born 1974), Italian marathon runner
- Ottaviano Canevari (1565–1639) was an Italian nobleman
- Ottaviano Capece (died 1616), Italian Roman Catholic prelate
- Ottaviano Carafa (died 1666), Italian Roman Catholic prelate
- Ottaviano da Faenza (fl. 14th century), Italian painter
- Ottaviano Dandini (died 1750), Italian painter
- Ottaviano degli Ubaldini (1214–1273), Italian Roman Catholic prelate
- Ottaviano dei Conti di Segni (died 1234), Italian Roman Catholic prelate
- Ottaviano dei Crescenzi Ottaviani di Monticelli (1095–1164), Italian antipope with the name Victor IV
- Ottaviano della Rovere (1615–1677), Italian Roman Catholic prelate
- Ottaviano Del Turco (born 1944), Italian politician
- Ottaviano de' Medici (1484–1546), Italian politician
- Ottaviano de' Medici, 1st Prince of Ottajano (1604–1629), Italian nobleman
- Ottaviano de' Medici (born 1957), Italian nobleman
- Ottaviano di Paoli (died 1206), Italian Roman Catholic prelate
- Ottaviano-Fabrizio Mossotti (1791–1863), Italian physicist
- Ottaviano Fregoso (1470–1524), Italian nobleman and Doge of Genoa
- Ottaviano Garzadori (1570–1653), Italian Roman Catholic prelate
- Ottaviano Guasco (1712–1781), Italian writer and translator
- Ottaviano Jannella (1635–1661), Italian sculptor (1791–1863), Italian physicist
- Ottaviano Maria Sforza (1475–1545), Italian Roman Catholic
- Ottaviano Menni (fl. 17th–18th centuries), Italian mathematician
- Ottaviano Nelli (1375–1444), Italian painter
- Ottaviano Nonni (1536–1606), Italian architect, sculptor and painter
- Ottaviano Petrucci (1466–1539), Italian printer
- Ottaviano Preconio (died 1568), Italian Roman Catholic prelate
- Ottaviano Preconio (bishop of Cefalù) (died 1587), Italian Roman Catholic prelate
- Ottaviano Querini (fl. 1181–1211), Italian politician
- Ottaviano Raggi (1592–1643), Italian Roman Catholic prelate
- Ottaviano Raverta (died 1561), Italian Roman Catholic prelate
- Ottaviano Riario (1479–1523), Italian condottiero
- Ottaviano Tenerani (born 1969), Italian keyboard player, conductor and musicologist

== People with the last name ==
- Chiara Ottaviano (born 1955), Italian historian and film director
- Gianmarco Ottaviano (born 1967), Italian economist
- Roberto Ottaviano (born 1957), Italian saxophonist
- Susan and Ted Ottaviano, members of the American band Book of Love
- Thomas Vitale Ottaviano (born 1936), American producer, director and screenwriter, known as Matt Cimber

== See also ==
- Ottaviani
- Ottaviano (disambiguation)
- Octavian (disambiguation)
