= Paolo Bucci (archer) =

Italian archer (born 1959)

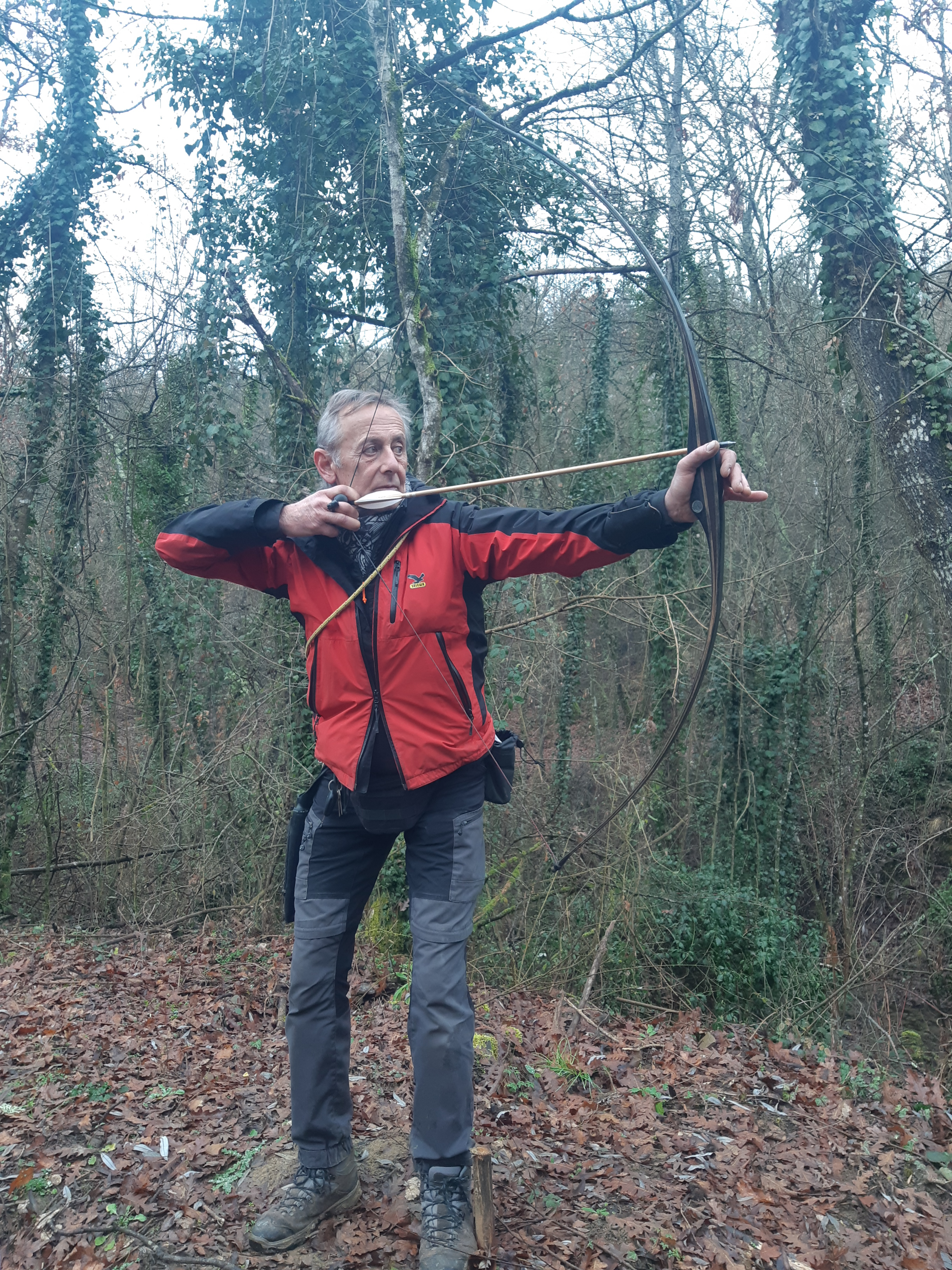
- Bucci training in Bibbiena

Personal information
- Born: 28 September 1959 (age 66) Florence, Italy

Sport
- Country: Italy
- Sport: Archery
- Event: Ricurve bow Longbow
- Club: A.S.D. Arcieri di Palagio Fiorentino - Italian National Team
Medal record
Men's Archery
Representing Italy
- Updated on 19 January 2026

Paolo Bucci (born 28 September 1959) is an Italian archer who competes in longbow archery.

He began archery in 1988 with the longbow, for a short period he used the compound bow but above all he used the recurve with which, in addition to various Italian Fiarc and European titles, he won the IFAA (International Field Archery Association) World Bowhunter Championship in 2003 in Castione della Presolana (BG). He later returns to the longbow and begins competing in competitions World Archery Federation through Fitarco (Italian Archery Federation) and in 2010 at the European 3D Championships he won two gold medals, in the individual and in the team with Antonio Pompeo and Giuseppe Seimandi, while the following year at the World 3D Championships in Donnersbach he won a gold medal in the individual and a bronze in the team.

== Internazional Palmarés World Archery ==
Longbow
World Archery 3D Championships
Edition	Place	Medal	Event
2009	Latina (Italia)	3rd place, bronze medalist(s)	Team
2011	Donnersbach (Austria)	1st place, gold medalist(s)	Individual
2011	Donnersbach (Austria)	3rd place, bronze medalist(s)	Team
European Archery 3D Championships
Edition	Place	Medal	Event
2010	Sassari (Italia)	1st place, gold medalist(s)	Individual
2010	Sassari (Italia)	1st place, gold medalist(s)	Team
2012	Trakošćan (Croazia)	3rd place, bronze medalist(s)	Team
