= Zuglio =

Zuglio Zui (Friulian)
- Comune
- Comune di Zuglio
- Coat of arms

- Location within Italy Location within Friuli-Venezia Giulia
- Coordinates: 46°27′44″N 13°1′30″E
- Country: Italy
- Region: Friuli-Venezia Giulia
- Province: Udine (UD)
- Frazioni: Fielis, Formeaso, Sezza

Government
  - Mayor: Stelio Dorissa

Area
  - Total: 8.3 km^{2} (3.2 sq mi)
- Elevation: 425 m (1,394 ft)

Population (2006)
  - Total: 633
  - Density: 76/km^{2} (200/sq mi)
- Time zone: UTC+1 (CET)
  - Summer (DST): UTC+2 (CEST)
- Postal code: 33020
- Dialing code: 0433
- Website: Official website

Zuglio (Friulian: Zui) is a comune (municipality), former bishopric and Latin Catholic titular see in the Regional decentralization entity of Udine in the northeastern Italian autonomous region of Friuli-Venezia Giulia, located about 110 kilometres (68 mi) northwest of Trieste and about 45 kilometres (28 mi) northwest of Udine, in the Val Bût.

Its territory includes the pieve (parish church) of San Pietro in Carnia, one of the oldest churches in Friuli. Zuglio is also home to an archaeological museum including remains from the old Roman town (Iulium Carnicum) and the whole Carnia.

== Ecclesiastical history ==
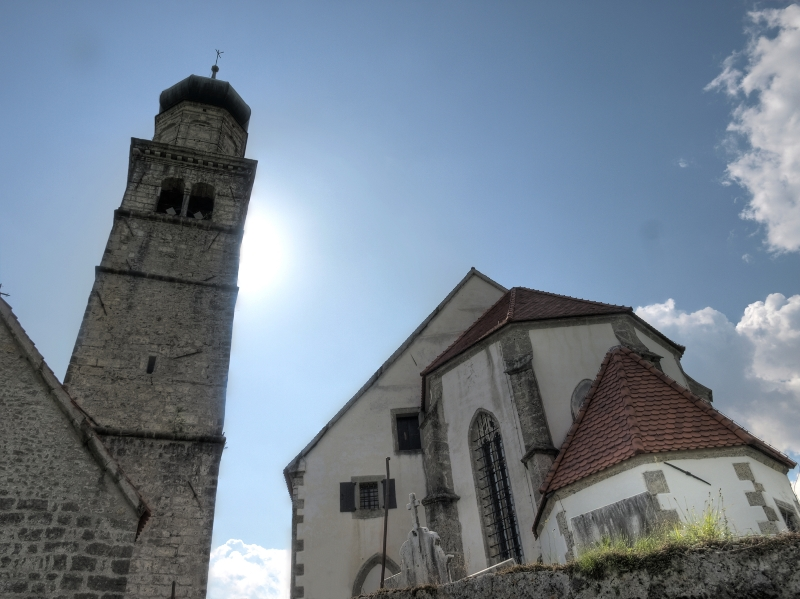
The Church S. Pietro in Carnia

- The Diocese of Zuglio (Italian) or Iulium Carnicum (in Latin) was established in 380 AD (or later according to the source) on territory -originally Cadore and Carnia - split off from the then Diocese of Aquileia and became its suffragan at its elevation to (metropolitan) Patriarchate of Aquileia in 560. The strategic position on the Iulia Augusta (connecting Aquileia, by Monte Croce Carnico, to Aguntum in Noricum) brought wealth and extended jurisdiction
- The barbaric invasions made the inhabitants flee the city, first probably translating their basilica and episcopal see up to San Pietro mount but abandoning Zuglio in 705 after a terrible raid by the Avars. The Longobard historian Paulus Diaconus notes that bishop Fidentius transferred his see to Cividale but his successor, Amatore, was chased there to in 737 by Patriarch Callixtus of Aquileia, who made Cividale his patriarchal see.
- It was suppressed in 740 at bishop Amatore's death, its territory being merged into the Patriarchate of Aquileia, but retained the right to a cathedral chapter until the Napoleonic era. Its former Cathedral, S. Pietro in Carnia, in Zuglio, was not granted co-cathedral status. Carnia ended up in the Archdiocese of Udine, Cadore went in 1846 to the Diocese of Belluno.

=== Residential Ordinaries ===
Suffragan Bishops of Zuglio

(Roman Rite) (incomplete)

- Amantius = Amanzio(393 – death 413)
- ...
- Januarius = Ianuario (480 – death 490)
- ...
- Maxentius = Massensio (571? – 591?)
- ...
- Fidenzio = Fidentius (705? – ?)
- Amator(e) (737? – death ?740).

=== Titular see ===
In 1967 the diocese was nominally restored as Latin Catholic Titular bishopric of Zuglio (Italian) alias Iulium Carnicum.

It has had the following incumbents, of the fitting episcopal (lowest) rank or the higher archiepiscopal (intermediary) rank:

- Titular Bishop Aldo Gobbi (1967.04.22 – death 1973.11.29) as Auxiliary Bishop of Diocese of Imola (Italy) (1967.04.22 – 1973.11.29)
- Titular Bishop Emilio Pizzoni (1974.03.21 – resigned 1985.08.01) as Auxiliary Bishop of Archdiocese of Udine (Italy) (1966.09.06 – retired 1985.08.01), died 1994; previously Bishop of Terracina (Italy) (1951.03.27 – 1966.09.06), Bishop of Priverno (Italy) (1951.03.27 – 1966.09.06), Bishop of Sezze (Italy) (1951.03.27 – 1966.09.06), Titular Bishop of Gunugus (1966.09.06 – 1974.03.21)
- Titular Bishop Pietro Brollo (1985.10.21 – 1996.01.02) as Auxiliary Bishop of Archdiocese of Udine (Italy) (1985.10.21 – 1996.01.02); later Bishop of Belluno–Feltre (Italy) (1996.01.02 – 2000.10.28), Metropolitan Archbishop of above Udine (Italy) (2000.10.28 – death 2009.08.20)
- Titular Bishop Alfred Kipkoech Arap Rotich (1996.03.09 – 1997.08.29) as Auxiliary Bishop of Archdiocese of Nairobi (Kenya) (1996.03.09 – 1997.08.29); next Military Ordinary of Kenya (Kenya) (1997.08.29 – retired 2016.12.30)
- Titular Archbishop Cardinal Mario Zenari (1999.07.12 – 2016.11.19), as papal diplomat: Apostolic Nuncio (ambassador) to Burkina Faso (1999.07.24 – 2004.05.10), Apostolic Nuncio to Sri Lanka (2004.05.10 – 2008.12.30), Apostolic Nuncio to Syria (2008.12.30 – ...); next created Cardinal-Deacon of S. Maria delle Grazie alle Fornaci fuori Porta Cavalleggeri (2016.11.19 [2017.03.25] – ...)
- Titular Bishop Pedro Sergio de Jesús Mena Díaz (2017.05.27 – ...), Bishop-elect as Auxiliary Bishop of Archdiocese of Yucatán (Mexico) (2017.05.27 – ...).

== Twin towns ==
- Rosegg, Austria

== See also ==
- List of Catholic dioceses in Italy

== Bibliography ==
- Francesco Lanzoni, Le diocesi d'Italia dalle origini al principio del secolo VII (an. 604), vol. II, Faenza 1927, pp. 895–896
