= Erbonia gens =

Ancient Roman family

The gens Erbonia was an obscure plebeian family of ancient Rome. No members of this gens are mentioned by Roman writers, but a number are known from inscriptions. The majority of the Erbonii appearing in epigraphy lived in Venetia and Histria and are found in inscriptions from Julium Carnicum and Aquileia in that province. A few are from neighboring provinces, including Dalmatia, Noricum, and Pannonia Superior.

== Praenomina ==
Most of the Erbonii bore the praenomen Sextus, and many of these were freedmen or the descendants of freedmen, probably indicating their descent from slaves manumitted by a Sextus Erbonius who settled at Julium Carnicum or Aquileia. A few Erbonii bore other common praenomina, including Gaius and Publius.

== Members ==
This list includes abbreviated praenomina. For an explanation of this practice, see filiation.

- Sextus Erbonius, named in a fragmentary inscription from Julium Carnicum in Venetia and Histria, dating from the latter half of the first century BC, along with persons named Porcius and Egnatius.
- Sextus Erbonius, named in an inscription from Julium Carnicum, dating from the last quarter of the first century BC, along with persons named Rotenius, Cornelius, and Quinctilius.
- Erbonia Sex. l. Jucunda, buried together with Gaius Varienus Jucundus at Julia Concordia in Venetia and Histria, in a tomb built by Marcus Varienus Dotus, dating from the late first century BC, or the early first century AD.
- Sextus Erbonius Sex. l. Diphilus, a freedman, and one of the magistrates of Julium Carnicum, together with the freedman Marcus Quinctilius Donatus. They dedicated an inscription, dating from the last quarter of the first century BC, naming the masters of the temple of Hercules, a group of freedmen including Sextus Erbonius Fronto and Sextus Erbonius Philogenes.
- Sextus Erbonius Sex. Sex. l. Fronto, a freedman, who along with Sextus Erbonius Philogenes and several other freedmen, were masters of the temple of Hercules at Julium Carnicum, commemorated in an inscription dedicated by Sextus Erbonius Diphilus and Marcus Quinctilius Donatus, magistrates of the town, dating from the last quarter of the first century BC.
- Erbonia Inven(tae?), buried at Julium Carnicum, in a tomb dating from the last quarter of the first century BC.
- Sextus Erbonius Sex. l. Philogenes, along with Sextus Erbonius Fronto and several other freedmen, masters of the temple of Hercules at Julium Carnicum, commemorated in an inscription dedicated by Sextus Erbonius Diphilus and Marcus Quinctilius Donatus, magistrates of the town, and dating from the last quarter of the first century BC.
- Publius Erbonius P. l. Princeps, a freedman and one of the magistrates of Julium Carnicum, along with the freedman Sextus Votticius Argentillus, rebuilt the temple of Belenus with their own money, and donated five gilded clupea, or round shields, and two signa, or sculptures, for the pediment, commemorated in an inscription dating from the last quarter of the first century BC.
- Sextus Erbonius Sex. l. Adjutor, one of several freedmen named in an inscription from Aquileia, including Sextus Erbonius Princeps, Sextus Erbonius Gallus, and others, and in another inscription from Julium Carnicum, dating between the last quarter of the first century BC and the first quarter of the first century AD, listing some of the same persons.
- Sextus Erbonius Sex. l. Gallio, one of several freedmen named in an inscription from Aquileia, along with Sextus Erbonius Adjutor, Sextus Erbonius Pinceps, and others, and in another inscription from Julium Carnicum, dating between the last quarter of the first century BC and the first quarter of the first century AD, listing some of the same persons.
- Sextus Erbonius Sex. l. Princeps, one of several freedmen named in an inscription from Aquileia, including Sextus Erbonius Adjutor, Sextus Erbonius Gallus, and others, and in another inscription from Julium Carnicum, dating between the last quarter of the first century BC and the first quarter of the first century AD, listing some of the same persons.
- Sextus Erbonius Sex. l. Tertius, one of a number of freedmen named in an inscription from Julium Carnicum, dating between the last quarter of the first century BC, and the first quarter of the first century AD, along with Sextus Erbonius Adjutor, Sextus Erbonius Princeps, and Sextus Erbonius Gallio.
- Erbonia Sex. l. Cirrata, a freedwoman buried at Aquileia in Venetia and Histria, along with the freedman Sextus Erbonius Surus and the freedwoman Erbonia Tertia, in a tomb dating from the early part of the first century.
- Sextus Erbonius Sex. l. Surus, a freedman buried at Aquileia, along with the freedwomen Erbonia Cirrata and Erbonia Tertia, in a tomb dating from the early part of the first century.
- Erbonia Ɔ. l. Tertia, a freedwoman buried at Aquileia, along with the freedman Sextus Erbonius Surus and the freedwoman Erbonia Cirrata, in a tomb dating from the early part of the first century.
- Erbonia Sex. f. Grata, buried at Aquileia, along with her husband, Tiberius Julius Viator, who had served as subprefect of the third cohort of Lusitanian auxiliaries, prefect of the Ubian cavalry cohort, and one of the municipal quattuorvirs, in a tomb built by Viator's father, Gaius Julius Linus, a freedman of the emperor Augustus, for his son and daughter-in-law, dating from the second quarter of the first century.
- Sextus Erbonius Sex. l., a freedman named in an inscription from Aquileia, dating from the first half of the first century, along with Cestronius Deuter and Sextus Erbonius Tabanus.
- Sextus Erbonius Hippia, the former master of the freedman Sextus Erbonius Tabanus, and perhaps another Sextus Erbonius named in the same inscription from Aquileia, dating from the first half of the first century.
- Sextus Erbonius Sex. l. Tabanus, the freedman of Sextus Erbonius Hippia, named along with two other freedmen, Cestronius Deuter and another Sextus Erbonius, in an inscription from Aquileia, dating from the first half of the first century.
- Erbonius, one of the seviri Augustales, buried at Aquileia in a tomb dating between the beginning and the third quarter of the first century, built by the freedman Erbonius Agathopus.
- Erbonius Agathopus, a freedman, built a tomb at Aquileia, dating between the beginning and the third quarter of the first century, for another Erbonius, one of the seviri Augustales.
- Sextus Erbonius, built a first-century tomb at Scarbantia in Pannonia Superior for his son, Sextus Erbonius Melantio.
- Sextus Erbonius Sex. f. Melantio, buried at Scarbantia, aged thirteen, in a first-century tomb built by his father, Sextus Erbonius.
- Sextus Erbonius Ingenuus, together with his wife and mother, made an offering to Spes at Salona in Dalmatia, at some point between the beginning of the first century, and the first half of the second.
- Erbonia Optata, dedicated a tomb at the site of modern Vöcklamarkt, formerly part of Noricum, dating between the latter half of the first century and the end of the second, for her husband, Lucius Terentius Restitutus, and son, Terentius Quietus.
- Erbonia, together with Flavius Ven[...], built a second-century tomb for themselves at Tergeste in Venetia and Histria.
- Gaius Erbonius C. l. Rutundus, a freedman and one of the seviri Augustales, made a second-century offering—possibly to Mercury—at Industria in Liguria.
- Sextus Erbonius, named in an inscription from Julium Carnicum, dating from the latter half of the second century, dedicated to Titus Julius Perseus, conductor of the public gate and collector of tolls.

=== Undated Erbonii ===
- Erbonia C. f., buried at Spoletium in Umbria, in a tomb dedicated by at least one of her parents, along with her brother and grandmother, whose names have not been preserved.
- Sextus Erbonius, a potter whose maker's mark has been found at the site of modern Flaibano, formerly part of Venetia and Histria.
- Sextus Erbonius, built a tomb at the site of modern Uttendorf, formerly part of Noricum, for himself, his wife, Atestia, and Erbonia Optata.
- Sextus Erbonius Anthus, buried at Rome.
- Erbonia Optata, buried at the site of modern Uttendorf, in a tomb built by Sextus Erbonius for himself, his wife, Atestia, and Optata.

== See also ==
- List of Roman gentes

== Bibliography ==
- Giovanni Battista Brusin, Inscriptiones Aquileiae (Inscriptions of Aquileia), Udine (1991–1993).
- René Cagnat et alii, L'Année épigraphique (The Year in Epigraphy, abbreviated AE), Presses Universitaires de France (1888–present).
- Theodor Mommsen et alii, Corpus Inscriptionum Latinarum (The Body of Latin Inscriptions, abbreviated CIL), Berlin-Brandenburgische Akademie der Wissenschaften (1853–present).
- Anna and Jaroslav Šašel, Inscriptiones Latinae quae in Iugoslavia inter annos MCMXL et MCMLX repertae et editae sunt (Inscriptions from Yugoslavia Found and Published between 1940 and 1960), Ljubljana (1963–1986).
