= 2011 World Archery 3D Championships =

Archery championship

- Location: Donnersbach-Planneralm, Austria
- Start date: 31 August
- End date: 03 September
- Competitors: 245 from 26 nations

The 2011 World Archery 3D Championships took place in Donnersbach-Planneralm (Austria), from August 31 to September 3, 2011. Austria, playing at home, was the nation that won the most medals.

== Medal summary ==
=== Elite events ===
Games	Gold	Silver	Bronze
Men's Events
Barebow Men's individual	Bobby Larsson; Sweden	Sebastian Juanola Codina; Spain	David Garcia Fernandez; Spain
Compound Men's individual	Herwig Haunschmid; Austria	Tim Watts; Canada	Christofer Herfindal; Sweden
Longbow Men's individual	Paolo Bucci; Italy	Enzo Lazzaroni; Italy	Julio Amat; Spain
Traditional Men's individual	Peter Garrett; Canada	Alexander Parschisek; Austria	Peter Nahoczki; Hungary
Men's team	France; Christel Puig; Serge Corvino; Corentin Doat	Sweden; Jari Hjerpe; Jan Johansson; Bobby Larsson	Italy; Antonio Pompeo; Paolo Bucci; Giuseppe Seimandi
Women's Events
Barebow Women's individual	Andrea Raigel; Austria	Lina Bjorklund; Sweden	Chantal Porte; France
Compound Women's individual	Lucy Holderness; United Kingdom	Petra Goebel; Austria	Irene Franchini; Italy
Longbow Women's individual	Encarna Garrido Lázaro; Spain	Petra Kraus; Austria	Katrin Virula; Estonia
Traditional Women's individual	Christa Ocenasek; Austria	Francesca Capretta; Italy	Petra Andrea Waltenspiel; Austria
Women's team	France; Rachel Terrasse; Sophie Cluze; Chantal Porte	Spain; Encarna Garrido Lázaro; Shenaida Merida Moreno; Anna Muntadas Abanco	Austria; Petra Goebel; Ines Fritz; Andrea Raigel

== Medal table ==
Host country Austria

Pos.	Country	Gold	Silver	Bronze	Tot.
1	Austria	3	3	2	8
2	France	2	0	1	3
3	Italy	1	2	2	5
3	Spain	1	2	2	5
4	Sweden	1	2	1	4
5	Canada	1	0	1	2
6	United Kingdom	1	0	0	1
7	Estonia	0	0	1	1
7	Hungary	0	0	1	1
