= Alessandro Argoli =

Alessandro Argoli may refer to:

- Alessandro Argoli (bishop of Terracina) (died 1540), Italian Roman Catholic bishop
- Alessandro Argoli (bishop of Veroli) (1594–1654), Italian Roman Catholic bishop
