= Juan Gálvez =

Juan Gálvez may refer to:

- Juan Gálvez (racing driver) (1916–1963), Argentine racing driver
- Juan Gálvez (painter) (1774–1846), Spanish artist
- Juan Gálvez (bishop) (died 1507), Spanish Roman Catholic prelate
- Juan Manuel Gálvez (1887–1972), president of Honduras

== See also ==
- Juan Manuel Gálvez International Airport, Honduras
