= Ottaviani =

Ottaviani is an Italian surname. Notable people with the surname include:

- Achille Ottaviani (1950–2023), Italian journalist and politician
- Alfonso Ottaviani (1937–2008), Italian modern pentathlete
- Alfredo Ottaviani (1890–1979), Italian Roman Catholic cardinal
- Angel Ottaviani (born 1940), Italian racing cyclist
- Ezio Ottaviani (1919–1986), Italian politician and teacher
- Flavia Ottaviani (born 1981), Italian ice dancer
- Giuseppe Ottaviani (athlete) (1916–2020), Italian centenarian and masters athlete
- Giuseppe Ottaviani (born 1978), Italian trance musician
- Jim Ottaviani, American writer
- Luciana Ottaviani (born 1967), real name of Italian actress Jessica Moore
- Nicola Ottaviani (born 1968), Italian politician and lawyer

== See also ==
- Ottaviani Intervention or Short Critical Study on the New Order of Mass
- Ottaviano (name)
