= Cesare Ventimiglia =

Italian Roman Catholic prelate (1573–1645)

Most Reverend Cesare Ventimiglia
- Church: Catholic Church
- Diocese: Diocese of Terracina, Priverno e Sezze
- In office: 1615–1645
- Predecessor: Pomponio de Magistris
- Successor: Alessandro Tassi

Orders
- Ordination: 31 December 1614
- Consecration: 25 March 1615 by Bonifazio Caetani

Personal details
- Born: 1573 Benevento, Italy
- Died: 23 December 1645 (age 72)

Cesare Ventimiglia or Caesar Vintirailius (1573 – 23 December 1645) was a Roman Catholic prelate who served as Bishop of Terracina, Priverno e Sezze (1615–1645).

== Biography ==
Cesare Ventimiglia was born in Benevento, Italy in 1573 and ordained a priest on 31 December 1614. On 12 January 1615, he was appointed during the papacy of Pope Paul V as Bishop of Terracina, Priverno e Sezze. On 25 March 1615, he was consecrated bishop by Bonifazio Caetani, Archbishop of Taranto, with Ascanio Gesualdo, Archbishop of Bari, and Pietro Francesco Montorio, Bishop of Nicastro, serving as co-consecrators. He served as Bishop of Terracina, Priverno e Sezze until his death on 23 December 1645.

== Episcopal succession ==
While bishop, he was the principal co-consecrator of:

- García Gil Manrique, Auxiliary Bishop of Cuenca (1618);
- Benedetto Baaz, Bishop of Umbriatico (1622);
- Cesare Gherardi, Bishop of Camerino (1622);
- Sebastiano De Paoli, Coadjutor Bishop of Nepi e Sutri (1622); and
- Alvaro Mendoza, Bishop of L'Aquila (1622).

== External links and additional sources ==
- Cheney, David M. "Diocese of Latina-Terracina-Sezze-Priverno". Catholic-Hierarchy.org. (for Chronology of Bishops) ^{[self-published]}
- Chow, Gabriel. "Diocese of Latina–Terracina–Sezze–Priverno (Italy)". GCatholic.org. (for Chronology of Bishops) ^{[self-published]}

Catholic Church titles
Preceded by Pomponio de Magistris	Bishop of Terracina, Priverno e Sezze; 1615–1645	Succeeded by Alessandro Tassi
