= Latina Cathedral =

Cathedral in Latina, Lazio, Italy

Coordinates: 41.4645°N 12.9029°E

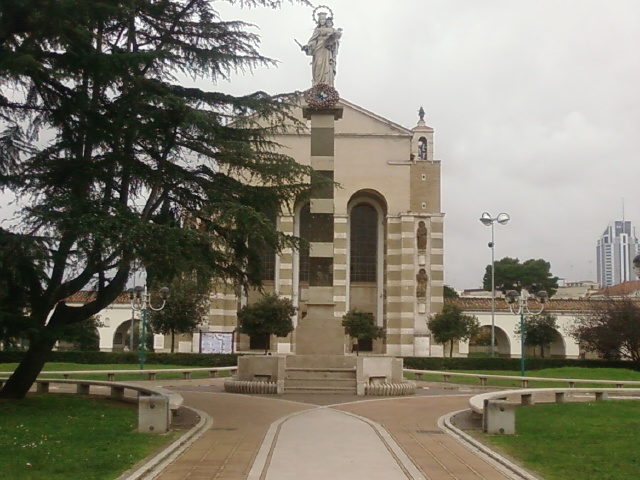
West front

Latina Cathedral (Italian: Cattedrale di San Marco, Duomo di Latina) is a Roman Catholic cathedral, dedicated to Saint Mark, situated in the centre of the city of Latina, Lazio, Italy. It is the seat of the bishops of Latina-Terracina-Sezze-Priverno.

== History ==
On 30 June 1932 the first stone was laid of the city of Littoria, subsequently renamed Latina, intended as an additional comune between the existing ones of Cisterna and Terracina. The project of the new town was entrusted to the architect Oriolo Frezzotti, who among the other buildings planned a church in the town centre.

Construction began in 1932 and finished the following year; the church was inaugurated and consecrated on 18 December 1933.

The parish was instituted on 23 November 1933 by Cardinal Enrico Gasparri, bishop of Velletri; the Salesians of Don Bosco were invited by Pope Pius XI to be responsible for San Marco on the insistence of the population and of Benito Mussolini. From 1967 the city became part of the diocese of Terracina-Latina, Priverno and Sezze: but keeping the ancient episcopal seats of the dioceses and cathedrals of Terracina, Sezze and Priverno, the bishops decided to place a single central residence in Latina, where the offices of the bishops' curia were also opened.

On 30 September 1986, with the decree Instantibus votis of the Congregation for Bishops and the union of the seats with the formula plena unione, the church of San Marco in Latina became the cathedral of the "new" diocese of Latina-Terracina-Sezze-Priverno.

== Description ==
=== Exterior ===
The lower parts of the exterior walls contain alternating bands of tuff and travertine. The gabled west front has a portico with three high round-arched openings in front standing on square pilasters, and corresponding to each arch a doorway behind opens into the body of the church, each one surmounted by a single window filled with stained glass. In the pediment are the sculptured arms of Pope Pius XI, while on the pilasters in the angles are statues of the Four Evangelists.

To the south of the church, in an isolated position, stands the tall campanile, built on a square groundplan, also with alternating bands of tuff and travertine. The bell chamber at the top contains three bells and on each side has a window with a single opening. Above the bell chamber stands a marble replica of the Madonnina on top of Milan Cathedral.

=== Interior ===
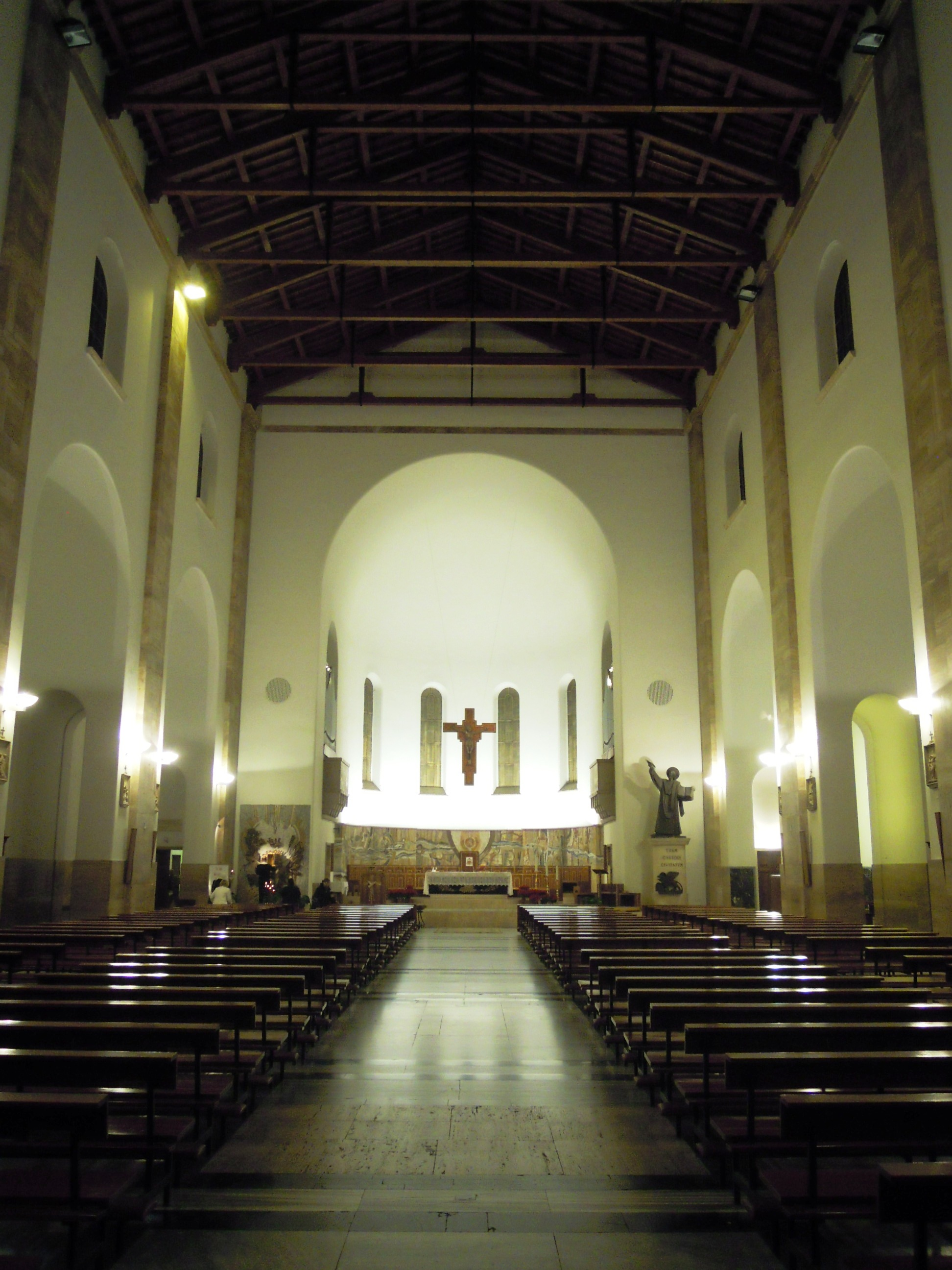
Interior looking east

The cathedral interior consists of a single-aisled nave with four chapels to each side. The nave is covered by an open wooden A-framed roof divided into four bays by lesene of yellow marble. The chapels are roofed by barrel vaulting and lit by high single windows; they are connected by high round arches. The fourth chapel on the south side, which is deeper than the others, has on its back wall a marble altar dedicated to the Virgin Mary surmounted by a wooden polychrome statue of the Madonna and Child.

The nave terminates in a long apse between the tabernacle on the north side and a statue of Saint Mark by F. Magni on the south side. The apse contains the presbytery which is raised on several steps above the body of the church. At its centre is the high altar over which hangs a crucifix, and the bishop's throne (cathedra). The back wall is decorated by a band of modern mosaics by V. Cinti.

== Bibliography ==
- Pier Giacomo Sottoriva, Latina, in Lazio. Una Regione da scoprire, Biblioteca Regionale Illustrata, Volume 7, Editalia, Roma 2006.
- Diocesi di Latina-Terracina-Sezze-Priverno Annuario diocesano 1997, Latina 1997.
- AA.VV., Guida rapida d'Italia. Lazio, Abruzzo, Molise, Sardegna, Touring Club Italiano, Milano 1995
