= Donnersbachwald =

- Former municipality
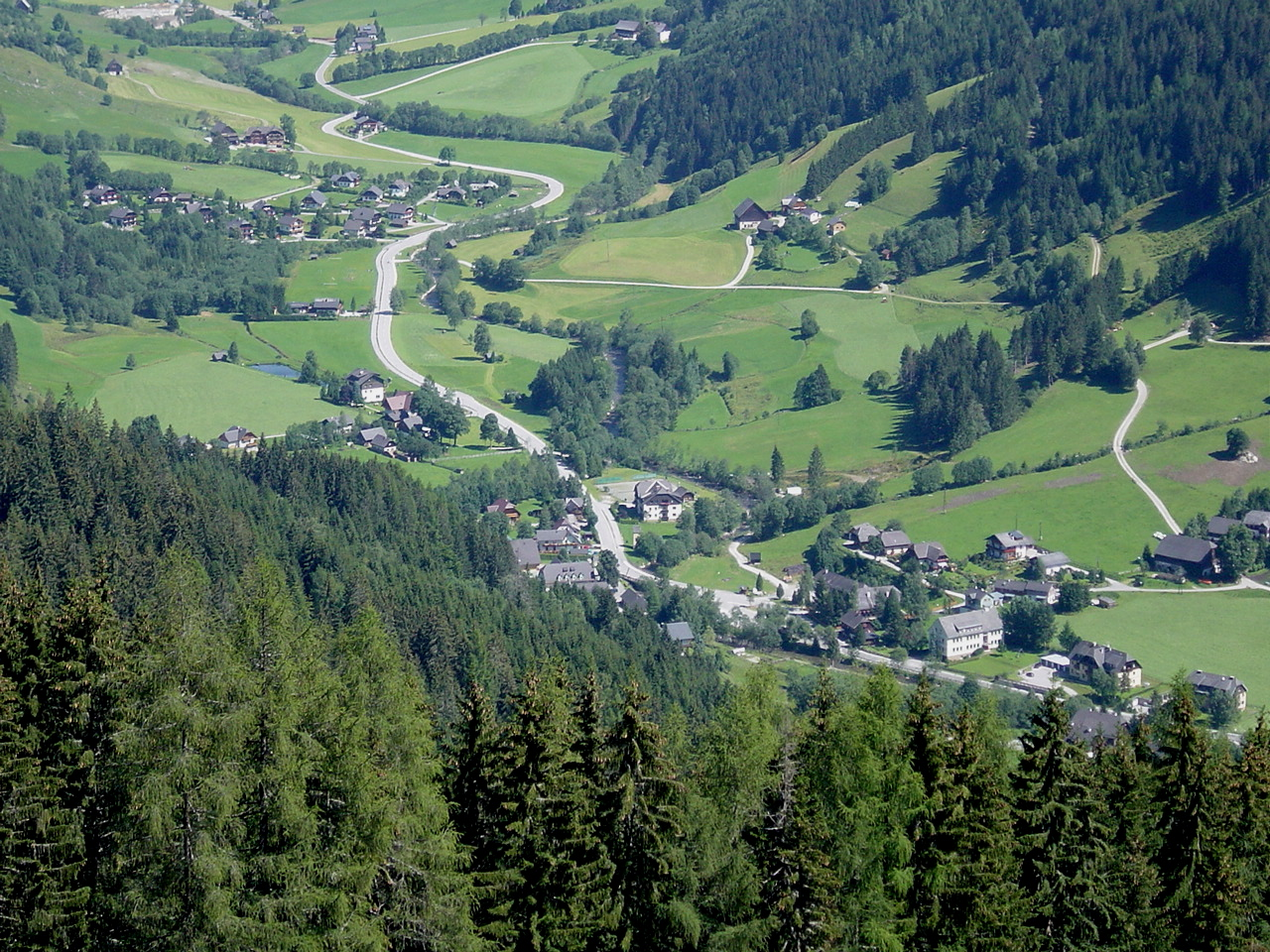

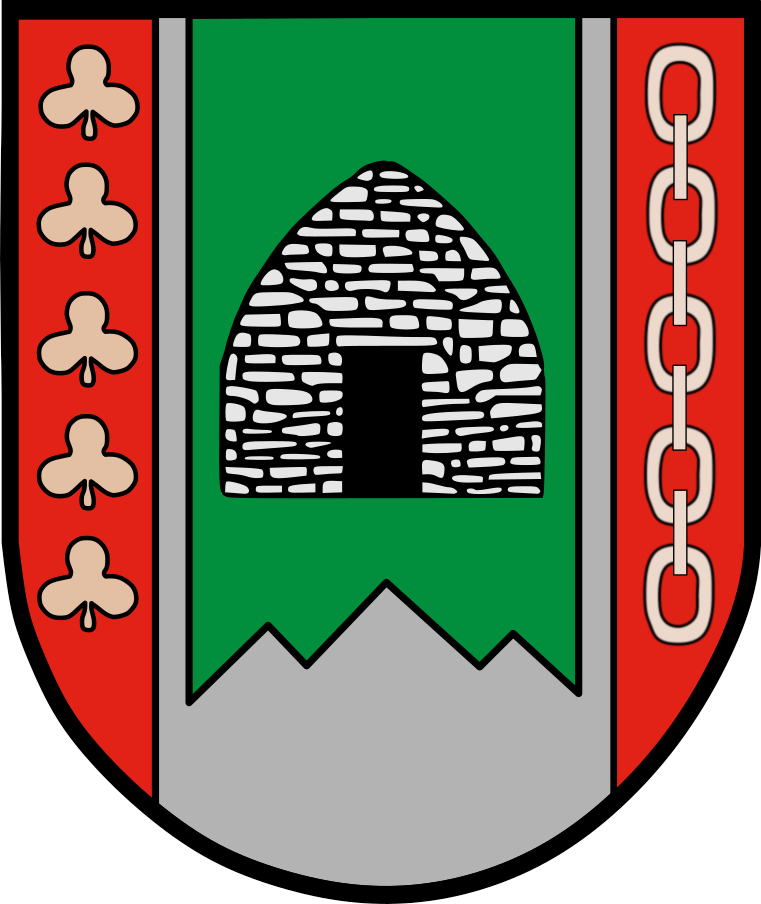
- Coat of arms

- Location within Austria
- Coordinates: 47°23′03″N 14°06′57″E
- Country: Austria
- State: Styria
- District: Liezen

Area
  - Total: 114.29 km^{2} (44.13 sq mi)
- Elevation: 1,000 m (3,300 ft)

Population (1 January 2016)
  - Total: 314
  - Density: 2.75/km^{2} (7.12/sq mi)
- Time zone: UTC+1 (CET)
  - Summer (DST): UTC+2 (CEST)
- Postal code: 8953
- Area code: 03680
- Vehicle registration: LI
- Website: www.donnersbachwald.at

Donnersbachwald is a former municipality in the district of Liezen in Styria, Austria. Since the 2015 Styria municipal structural reform, it is part of the municipality Irdning-Donnersbachtal.
