= Giovanni de Copis =

Italian Roman Catholic prelate

Most Reverend Giovanni de Copis
- Bishop of Terracina, Priverno e Sezze
- Church: Catholic Church
- Diocese: Diocese of Terracina, Priverno e Sezze
- In office: 1522–1527
- Predecessor: Andrea Cibo
- Successor: Antonio Bonsius

Personal details
- Died: 15 August 1527

Giovanni de Copis (died 1527) was a Roman Catholic prelate who served as Bishop of Terracina, Priverno e Sezze (1522–1527).

== Biography ==
On 29 October 1522, Giovanni de Copis was appointed during the papacy of Pope Adrian VI as Bishop of Terracina, Priverno e Sezze. He served as Bishop of Terracina, Priverno e Sezze until his death on 15 August 1527.

== External links and additional sources ==
- Cheney, David M. "Diocese of Latina-Terracina-Sezze-Priverno". Catholic-Hierarchy.org. (for Chronology of Bishops) ^{[self-published]}
- Chow, Gabriel. "Diocese of Latina–Terracina–Sezze–Priverno (Italy)". GCatholic.org. (for Chronology of Bishops) ^{[self-published]}

Catholic Church titles
Preceded by Andrea Cibo	Bishop of Terracina, Priverno e Sezze; 1522–1527	Succeeded by Antonio Bonsius
