= Francesco Beltramini =

1xth-century Catholic bishop

Most Reverend Francesco Beltramini
- Bishop of Terracina, Priverno e Sezze
- Church: Catholic Church
- Diocese: Diocese of Terracina, Priverno e Sezze
- In office: 1564–1575
- Predecessor: Ottaviano della Raverta
- Successor: Beltramino Beltramini
- Previous post: Apostolic Nuncio to France (1565–1566)

Orders
- Consecration: 29 Jul 1565 by Jean Suau

Personal details
- Born: 1522 Colle Val d'Elsa, Italy
- Died: 1575 (age 53) Terracina, Italy

Francesco Beltramini (1522–1575) was a Roman Catholic prelate who served as Bishop of Terracina, Priverno e Sezze (1564–1575) and Apostolic Nuncio to France (1565–1566).

== Biography ==
Francesco Beltramini was born in Colle Val d'Elsa, Italy in 1522. On 21 Jun 1564, he was appointed during the papacy of Pope Julius III as Bishop of Terracina, Priverno e Sezze. On 29 Jul 1565, he was consecrated bishop by Jean Suau, Cardinal-Priest of Santa Prisca, with Ascanio Albertini, Bishop of Avellino e Frigento, serving as co-consecrators. In Oct 1565, he was appointed during the papacy of Pope Paul IV as Apostolic Nuncio to France; he resigned from this position on 25 Mar 1566. He served as Bishop of Terracina, Priverno e Sezze until his death in 1575 in Terracina, Italy.

== External links and additional sources ==
- Cheney, David M. "Diocese of Latina-Terracina-Sezze-Priverno". Catholic-Hierarchy.org. (for Chronology of Bishops) ^{[self-published]}
- Chow, Gabriel. "Diocese of Latina–Terracina–Sezze–Priverno (Italy)". GCatholic.org. (for Chronology of Bishops) ^{[self-published]}
- Cheney, David M. "Nunciature to France". Catholic-Hierarchy.org. (for Chronology of Bishops) ^{[self-published]}
- Chow, Gabriel. "Apostolic Nunciature France". GCatholic.org. (for Chronology of Bishops) ^{[self-published]}

Catholic Church titles
| Preceded by Ottaviano della Raverta | Bishop of Terracina, Priverno e Sezze; 1564–1575 | Succeeded by Beltramino Beltramini |
| Preceded by Prospero Publicola Santacroce | Apostolic Nuncio to France; 1565–1566 | Succeeded by Fabio Mirto Frangipani |

|}
