= Diocese of Latina-Terracina-Sezze-Priverno =

Latin Catholic ecclesiastical jurisdiction in Italy

Coordinates: 41.4667°N 12.9000°E

Diocese of Latina-Terracina-Sezze-Priverno Dioecesis Latinensis-Terracinensis-Setina-Privernensis

Catholic
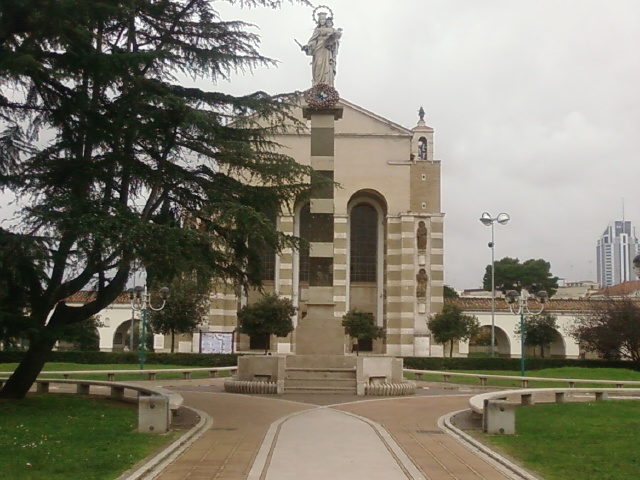
- Latina Cathedral

Location
- Country: Italy
- Ecclesiastical province: Immediately exempt to the Holy See

Statistics
- Area: 1,371 km^{2} (529 sq mi)
- Population: Total; Catholics: (as of 2016); 336,474; 323,214 (96.1%)
- Parishes: 87

Information
- Denomination: Catholic Church
- Sui iuris church: Latin Church
- Rite: Roman Rite
- Established: By 1217; Reorganized 1986
- Cathedral: Cattedrale di S. Marco (Latina)
- Co-cathedral: Concattedrale di S. Cesareo (Terracina); Concattedrale di S. Maria (Sezze); Concattedrale di S. Maria Annunziata (Priverno)
- Secular priests: 75 (diocesan); 53 (Religious Orders); 21 Permanent Deacons

Current leadership
- Pope: Leo XIV
- Bishop: Mariano Crociata

Website
- diocesi.latina.it (in Italian)

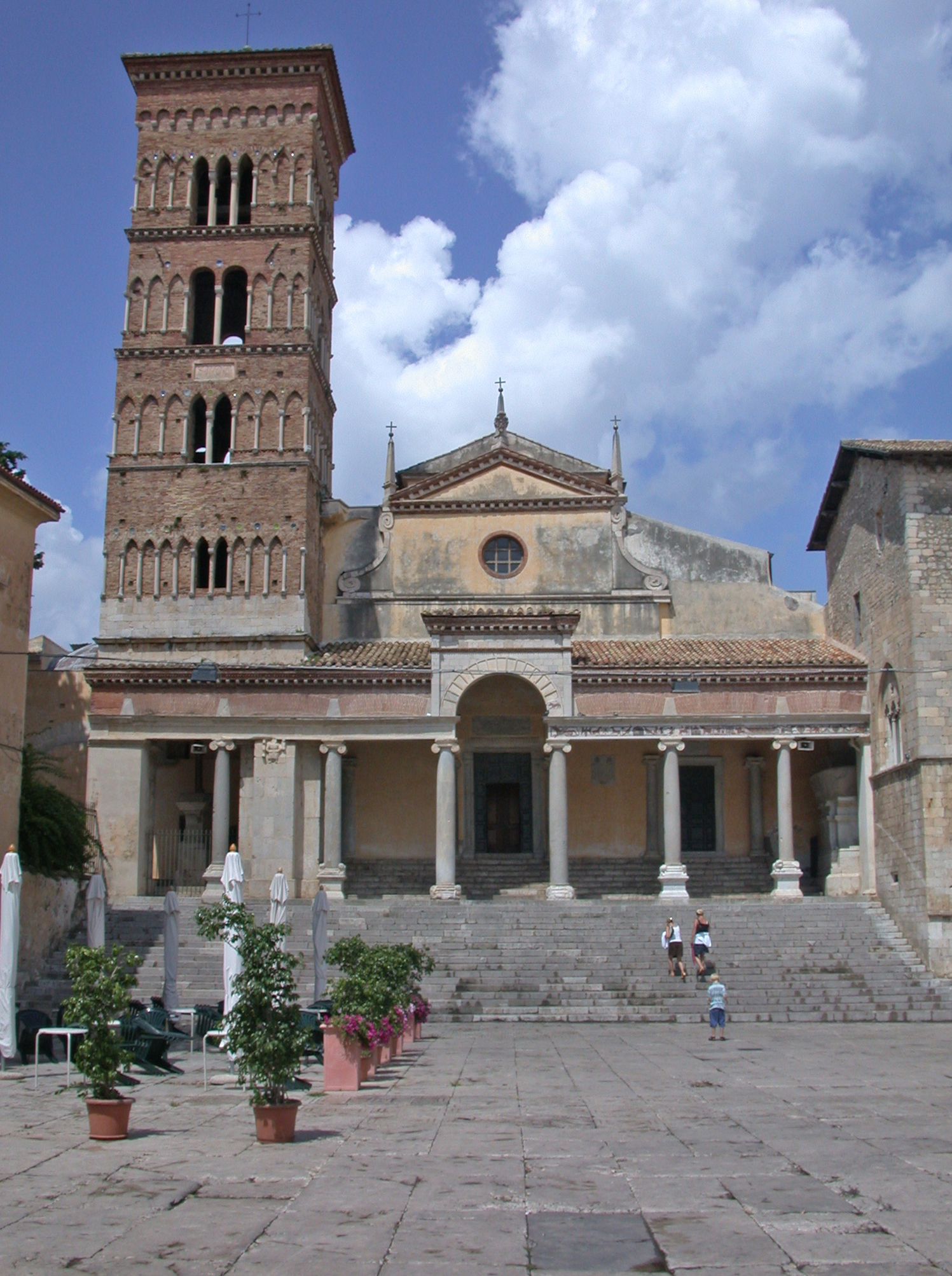
Terracina Cathedral

The Diocese of Latina-Terracina-Sezze-Priverno (Latin: Dioecesis Latinensis-Terracinensis-Setina-Privernensis) is a Latin Church ecclesiastical territory or diocese of the Catholic Church in Lazio, Italy. It was established under this name in 1986. It is the continuation of the Diocese of Terracina, Priverno e Sezze, whose existence was confirmed by Pope Honorius III in 1217, as a joining of the Diocese of Terracina with the Diocese of Priverno and the Diocese of Sezze under a single bishop. It is immediately exempt to the Holy See.

== History ==
According to a local tradition, the first bishop of Terracina was St. Epaphroditus, who is claimed to have been one of Jesus' original seventy-two disciples, mentioned by Paul of Tarsus in one of his epistles. The most ancient Christian record of the city is that of the martyrdom of St. Julianus, priest, and St. Cæsareus, deacon, who were cast into the sea under the emperor Trajan. The early date is rejected by Francesco Lanzoni, along with many hagiographical details. In the third century, a Quartus is recorded by the "Passion of S. Caesareo" as a sacerdos, and martyr along with Caesareo; he is also mentioned as a martyr along with Quintus of Capua. There is no reason to think that Quartus was a bishop.

The first bishop whose date is known with certainty is Sabinus. He was present at the Lateran synod of Pope Miltiades in November 313.

It is claimed that an African priest, Silvianus, a fugitive during the Vandal persecution was bishop of Terracina about 443. The catalogue of Hieronymianus notes under 10 February: "iuxta Terracina in Campania natale Silvani episcopi et confessoris." The story of his African origins first appears in an anonymous local historian of Terracina belonging to the 17th and 18th centuries. It is rejected by Francesco Lanzoni as being without foundation. He also rejects the date of 444, preferring to place Silvianus in the 4th century.

Agnellus, Bishop of Fondi, whose city had been destroyed, was appointed cardinalis sacerdos of the diocese of Terracina by Pope Gregory I.

The sees of Piperno (Privernum) and Sezze (Setia), situated on the side of the Lepinian hills, were united to Terracina, perhaps by Pope Alexander III, or even earlier. The union of the three dioceses was confirmed by Pope Honorius III on 18 January 1217, during the episcopate of Simeone.

On 16 July 1725, with the Bull "Regis Pacifici", Pope Benedict XIII restored the See of Piperno and Sezze, declaring them united aeque principaliter to the diocese of Terracina.

Bishop Francesco Antonio Mondelli (1805) was exiled in 1809, for refusing to take the oath of loyalty to Napoleon, following the arrest, deposition and deportation of Pope Pius VII. He was deported first to the fortress of Chambéry in Savoy, and then to Trevoux in France.

The Cistercian Abbey of Fossa Nuova is within the territory of this see. The diocese is immediately subject to the Holy See (Papacy).

=== Chapters and cathedrals ===
The cathedral of Terracina, dedicated to S. Cesareo, was built in the 11th and 12th centuries, on foundations of an ancient Roman temple, dedicated to Apollo, or to the Goddess Roma and Augustus. It was served and administered by a corporation, the Chapter, composed of twelve Canons, presided over by the Archpriest. Since the cathedral served as a parish church, the Archdeacon had the "cure of souls" (responsibility for the spiritual welfare of the parishioners).

The cathedral of Latina, dedicated to S. Marco, was begun in 1932 as a parish church, at the same time that Latina was established as a city and the capital of its prefecture. The former Pontine Marshes, which had finally been drained after more than fifty years of work, were opened to agriculture, and the state sponsored a large-scale immigration from the Veneto, whose principal patron saint was Mark the Evangelist of Venice. The new parish church was dedicated on 23 November 1933, by Cardinal Enrico Gasparri, suburbicarian Bishop of Velletri. It was elevated to the status of a cathedral on 30 September 1986.

The original church at Sezze was dedicated to S. Luke, the mythological founder of the Christian community at Setina. There was a Romanesque church, which was seriously damaged in a fire in 1150. The latest known bishop of Sezze was Bishop Landus in 1178. The Romanesque church was replaced, and a new church dedicated on 18 August 1364, by the Franciscan Bishop Giovanni of Terracina, Priverno e Sezze. It was dedicated to the Virgin Mary. Pope Benedict XIII granted the old cathedral the title of "minor basilica". By the papal bull of 29 April 1725, the church of S. Maria was reestablished as a cathedral and united aeque principaliter with the diocese of Terracina. The cathedral was staffed and administered by a Chapter, consisting of three dignities and twelve Canons.

The cathedral of Piperno was dedicated to the Virgin Mary. The old cathedral was destroyed in a fire in 1159, and Pope Lucius III dedicated a new cathedral in the summer of 1183. The cathedral was staffed and administered by a Chapter, consisting of an Archpriest and twelve Canons.

=== Diocesan reorganization ===
Pope Leo XIII had determined that all of the dioceses of Lazio should belong to one and the same ecclesiastical province. His successor Pope Pius X, however, decided to split the province into two, Upper Lazio and Lower Lazio (to which Terracina belonged), while the suburbicarian bishops would belong to a separate conference under the direction of the Vicar of the city of Rome. The city of Latina, however, which was the largest in Lazio except for Rome itself, belonged to the diocese of Velletri, one of the suburbicarian bishoprics.

The Second Vatican Council, in order to ensure that all Catholics received proper spiritual attention, decreed the reorganization of the diocesan structure of Italy and the consolidation of small and struggling dioceses, in particular those with financial and personnel problems. It also decreed that the natural population units of people, together with the civil jurisdictions and social institutions that compose their organic structure, should be preserved as far as possible as units. It was their wish that all of Lazio was to belong to one ecclesiastical province. Latina was recognized as an anomaly in terms of ecclesiastical organization. Therefore, on 12 September 1967, with the approval of Pope Paul VI, the Consistorial Congregation ordered that the part of the territory of Lazio that belonged to the district of which Latina was the capital was to be transferred from the diocese of Velletri to the diocese of Terracina, bringing a substantial increase in territory and population to the diocese of Terracina. On the same day, in a separate decree, the name of the diocese was changed to "Terracinensis-Latiniensis, Privernensis et Setinus".

On 18 February 1984, the Vatican and the Italian State signed a new and revised concordat. Based on the revisions, a set of Normae was issued on 15 November 1984, which was accompanied in the next year, on 3 June 1985, by enabling legislation. According to the agreement, the practice of having one bishop govern two separate dioceses at the same time, aeque personaliter, was abolished. This applied to the dioceses of Terracina-Latina and Priverno e Sezza. The Vatican therefore continued consultations which had begun under Pope John XXIII for the merging of dioceses. On 30 September 1986, Pope John Paul II ordered that the dioceses of Terracina-Latina and Priverno e Sezza be merged into one diocese with one bishop, with the Latin title Dioecesis Latinensis-Terracinensis-Setina-Privernensis. The seat of the diocese was to be in Latina, the largest city and capital of the province, and the cathedral of Latina, San Marco, was to serve as the cathedral of the merged dioceses. The cathedrals in Terracina, Sezze, and Priverno were to become co-cathedrals, and the cathedral Chapters were each to be a Capitulum Concathedralis. There was to be only one diocesan Tribunal, in Latina, and likewise one seminary, one College of Consultors, and one Priests' Council. The territory of the new diocese was to include the territory of the former dioceses of Latina, Terracina, Sezze, and Priverno.

=== Diocesan synods ===
A diocesan synod was an irregularly held, but important, meeting of the bishop of a diocese and his clergy. Its purpose was (1) to proclaim generally the various decrees already issued by the bishop; (2) to discuss and ratify measures on which the bishop chose to consult with his clergy; (3) to publish statutes and decrees of the diocesan synod, of the provincial synod, and of the Holy See.

In 1640, Bishop Cesare Ventimiglia (1615–1645) presided over a diocesan synod. In 1764. Bishop Francesco Odoardi (1758–1775) held a diocesan synod at Priverno. In 1784, from 30 May to 1 June, Bishop Benedetto Pucilli (1775–1786) held a diocesan synod in the cathedral of Terracina, the decrees of which were published in Rome in 1885 by the Salamonian press.

A diocesan synod of the diocese of Terracina Priverno e Sezze was held by Bishop Salvatore Baccarini (1922–1930) in 1929.

Bishop Giuseppe Petrocchi (1998–2013) presided over the first diocesan synod of the reorganized and renamed diocese of Latina-Terracina-Sezze-Priverno from 2005 to 2012. An extensive report of the consultations, Perché la nostra Chiesa sia "Più-Una", was published.

== Bishops ==
=== Diocese of Terracina ===
...

- Sabinus (attested 313)

...

- John (died 443)
- Silvanus (attested 443–?)

...

- Martyrius (attested 496–502)

...

- Petrus (attested 591–592)
- Agnellus (attested 592–598)

...

- Sabbatinus (attested 963–964)
- Benedictus (attested 969)

...

- Joannes (attested 986–994))

...

- Adeodatus (attested 1015)
- Joannes
- Theodaldus (attested 1042)
- Joannes

...

- Ambrosius, O.S.B. (attested 1064–1071)

...

- Petrus (attested 1092–1095)
- Benedictus (attested 1098–1105)
- Gregorius, O.S.B. (attested 1112–1126)

...

- Hugo (attested 1168–1179)

...

- Filegarius (attested 1196–1199)
- Simeon (attested 1203–1217–1224)

=== Diocese of Terracina, Priverno e Sezze ===
United: 17 January 1217 with the Diocese of Priverno and the Diocese of Sezze

==== 1217 to 1500 ====
- Simeon (continued)
- Gregorius (attested 1227–1238)
- Docibilis (attested 1248)
- Petrus (attested 1257–1259)
- Franciscus Canis (attested 1263–1273)
- Franciscus, O.Min. (1273–1295)
- Theobaldus, O.Min. (1295–1296)
- Albertus (1296–1300)
- Joannes (1300–1318)
- Andreas (1319–1326)
- Sergius Peronti (1326–1348)
- Petrus (1348–1352)
- Jacobus de Perusio, O.E.S.A. (1352–1362)
- Giovanni Ferreri, O.Min. (1362–1369)
- Stefano Armandi (1369–1381?)
- Rogerius ( ? –1390) Roman Obedience
- Nicolaus (1390–1402) Roman Obedience
- Marinus de Santa Agatha (1402–1404) Roman Obedience
- Antonius (de Rossi) (1404–1411)
- Antonius da Zagarolo, O.F.M. (1411–1422)
- Andrea Gacci (1422–1425)
- Giovanni de Normannis (1425–1427)
- Nicola de Aspra (1430–1448)
- Alessandro Trani (1448)
- Alexander de Gaetano (1449–1455)
- Franciscus de Benedictus de Licata (15 Dec 1455 – 1458 Died)
- Corrado Marcellini (1458–1490)
- Francesco Rosa (1490–1500)

==== 1500 to 1800 ====
- Juan Gálvez (1500–1507)
- Oliviero Carafa (1507–1510 Resigned) Administrator
- Zaccaria de Moris (1510–1517)
- Andrea Cibo (Cybo) (1517–1522)
- Giovanni de Copis (1522–1527)
- Antonio Bonsi (1528–1533)
- Cinzio Filonardi (1533–1534)

Cipriano de Caris (1534 Died)

- Alessandro Argoli (1534–1540)
- Ottaviano Maria Sforza (1540–1545)
- Ottaviano Raverta (1545–1562)
- Francesco Beltramini (1564–1575)
- Beltramino Beltramini (1575–1582)
- Luca Cardino (1582–1594)
- Fabrizio Perugini (1595–1608)
- Pomponio de Magistris (28 Jan 1608 – 1614)
- Cesare Ventimiglia (1615–1645)
- Alessandro Tassi (25 Jun 1646 – 21 Nov 1647)
- Francesco Maria Ghislieri (1 Feb 1649 –1664)
- Pompeo Angelotti (15 Dec 1664 – 2 Mar 1667)
- Ercole Domenico Monanni (1667–1710)
- Bernardo Maria Conti, O.S.B. (1 Dec 1710 – 3 Jun 1720 Resigned)
- Giovanni Battista Conventati, C.O. (3 Jul 1720 – 27 Nov 1726 Resigned)
- Gioacchino Maria Oldi, O. Carm. (1726–1749)
- Callisto Maria (Vincenzo Antonio) Palombella, O.S.M. (1 Dec 1749 – 3 May 1758)
- Francesco Alessandro Odoardi (11 Sep 1758 – 18 Jan 1775)
- Benedetto Pucilli (29 May 1775 – 7 Apr 1786)
- Angelo Antonio Anselmi (18 Dec 1786 –1792)

==== 1800 to 1966 ====
- Michele Argelati, O.S.M. (1800–1805)
- Francesco Antonio Mondelli (23 Sep 1805 – 26 Sep 1814 Appointed Bishop of Città di Castello)
- Francesco Saverio (François-Xavier) Pereira (15 Mar 1815 – 2 Oct 1818 Appointed Bishop of Rieti)
- Francesco Albertini (29 Mar 1819 – 24 Nov 1819 Died)
- Carlo Cavalieri Manassi (21 Feb 1820 – 19 Aug 1826 Died)
- Luigi Frezza (2 Oct 1826 – 15 Dec 1828 Appointed Titular Archbishop of Chalcedon)
- Bernardino Panzacchi (20 Jan 1834 – 24 Dec 1834 Died)
- Guglielmo Aretini-Sillani (6 Apr 1835 – 4 Dec 1853 Resigned)
- Nicola Bedini (19 Dec 1853 – 29 Sep 1862 Resigned)
- Bernardino Trionfetti, O.F.M. (25 Sep 1862 – 23 Feb 1880 Resigned)
- Flaviano Simoneschi (27 Feb 1880 – 2 Jul 1883 Resigned)
- Tommaso Mesmer (9 Aug 1883 – 12 Dec 1892 Died)
- Paolo Emio Bergamaschi (12 Jun 1893 – 19 Jun 1899 Appointed Bishop of Troia)
- Domenico Ambrosi (18 Sep 1899 – 17 Aug 1921 Died)
- Salvatore Baccarini, C. R. (7 Mar 1922 – 30 Jun 1930 Appointed Archbishop of Capua)
- Pio Leonardo Navarra, O.F.M. Conv. (29 Jan 1932 – 2 Feb 1951 Resigned)
- Emilio Pizzoni (27 Mar 1951 – 6 Sep 1966 Resigned)

=== Diocese of Terracina-Latina, Priverno e Sezze ===
- Arrigo Pintonello (12 Sep 1967 – 25 Jun 1971 Resigned)
- Enrico Romolo Compagnone, O.C.D. (9 Mar 1972 – 22 Dec 1983 Retired)
- Domenico Pecile (22 Dec 1983 – 27 Jun 1998 Retired)

=== Diocese of Latina-Terracina-Sezze-Priverno ===
Name Changed: 30 September 1986

- Giuseppe Petrocchi (27 Jun 1998 – 8 Jun 2013 Appointed Archbishop of L'Aquila)
- Mariano Crociata (19 Nov 2013 – )

== Books ==
- Gams, Pius Bonifatius (1873). Series episcoporum Ecclesiae catholicae: quotquot innotuerunt a beato Petro apostolo (in Latin). Ratisbon: Typis et Sumptibus Georgii Josephi Manz. pp. 731–733.
- Eubel, Conradus, ed. (1913). Hierarchia catholica (in Latin). Vol. Tomus 1 (second ed.). Münster: Libreria Regensbergiana.
- Eubel, Conradus, ed. (1914). Hierarchia catholica (in Latin). Vol. Tomus 2 (second ed.). Münster: Libreria Regensbergiana.
- Gulik, Guilelmus (1923). Eubel, Conradus (ed.). Hierarchia catholica (in Latin). Vol. Tomus 3 (second ed.). Münster: Libreria Regensbergiana.
- Gauchat, Patritius (Patrice) (1935). Hierarchia catholica (in Latin). Vol. Tomus IV (1592-1667). Münster: Libraria Regensbergiana.
- Ritzler, Remigius; Sefrin, Pirminus (1952). Hierarchia catholica medii et recentis aevi V (1667-1730) (in Latin). Patavii: Messagero di S. Antonio.
- Ritzler, Remigius; Sefrin, Pirminus (1958). Hierarchia catholica medii et recentis aevi (in Latin). Vol. Tomus VI (1730-1799). Patavii: Messagero di S. Antonio.
- Ritzler, Remigius; Sefrin, Pirminus (1968). Hierarchia Catholica medii et recentioris aevi sive summorum pontificum, S. R. E. cardinalium, ecclesiarum antistitum series... A pontificatu Pii PP. VII (1800) usque ad pontificatum Gregorii PP. XVI (1846) (in Latin). Vol. VII. Monasterii: Libr. Regensburgiana.
- Remigius Ritzler; Pirminus Sefrin (1978). Hierarchia catholica Medii et recentioris aevi... A Pontificatu PII PP. IX (1846) usque ad Pontificatum Leonis PP. XIII (1903) (in Latin). Vol. VIII. Il Messaggero di S. Antonio.
- Pięta, Zenon (2002). Hierarchia catholica medii et recentioris aevi... A pontificatu Pii PP. X (1903) usque ad pontificatum Benedictii PP. XV (1922) (in Latin). Vol. IX. Padua: Messagero di San Antonio. ISBN 978-88-250-1000-8.

=== Studies ===
- de La Blanchère, M.-R. (1884). René-Marie du Coudray de La Blanchère (ed.). Terracine: essai d'histoire locale (in French). Paris: E. Thorin.
- Cappelletti, Giuseppe (1846). Le chiese d'Italia della loro origine sino ai nostri giorni (in Italian). Vol. sesto. Venezia: G. Antonelli. pp. 515–613.
- Kehr, Paul Fridolin (1907). Italia pontificia. vol. II: Latium. Berlin 1909. pp. 113–130. (in Latin)
- Lanzoni, Francesco (1927), Le diocesi d'Italia dalle origini al principio del secolo VII (an. 604), Faenza 1927, pp. 516–517; 545–547. (in Italian)
- Schwartz, Gerhard (1913), Die Besetzung der Bistümer Reichsitaliens unter den sächsischen und salischen Kaisern : mit den Listen der Bischöfe, 951-1122, Leipzig-Berlin 1913, pp. 272–273. (in German)
- Ughelli, Ferdinando; Coleti, Niccolò (1717). Italia sacra sive De Episcopis Italiae, et insularum adjacentium (in Latin). Vol. Tomus primus (1) (editio secunda, aucta et emendata ed.). Venice: apud Sebastianum Coleti. pp. 1278–1301.
