= Francesco Rosa (bishop) =

Italian Roman Catholic prelate

Most Reverend Francesco Rosa
- Bishop of Terracina, Priverno e Sezze
- Church: Catholic Church
- Diocese: Diocese of Terracina, Priverno e Sezze
- In office: 1490–1500
- Predecessor: Corrado Marcellini
- Successor: Juan Gálvez (bishop)

Personal details
- Died: 1500

Francesco Rosa (died 1500) was a Roman Catholic prelate who served as Bishop of Terracina, Priverno e Sezze (1490–1500).

== Biography ==
Francesco was a native of Terracina, and held the degree of Doctor of Law. On 20 November 1486, Pope Innocent VIII named him Bishop of Foligno.

On 3 March 1490, Francesco Rosa was appointed Bishop of Terracina, Priverno e Sezze by Innocent VIII. He served as Bishop of Terracina, Priverno e Sezze until his death in 1500.

== External links and additional sources ==
- Cheney, David M. "Diocese of Latina-Terracina-Sezze-Priverno". Catholic-Hierarchy.org. (for Chronology of Bishops) ^{[self-published]}
- Chow, Gabriel. "Diocese of Latina–Terracina–Sezze–Priverno (Italy)". GCatholic.org. (for Chronology of Bishops) ^{[self-published]}

Catholic Church titles
Preceded by Corrado Marcellini	Bishop of Terracina, Priverno e Sezze; 1490–1500	Succeeded by Juan Gálvez (bishop)
