= Irdning-Donnersbachtal =

- Municipality
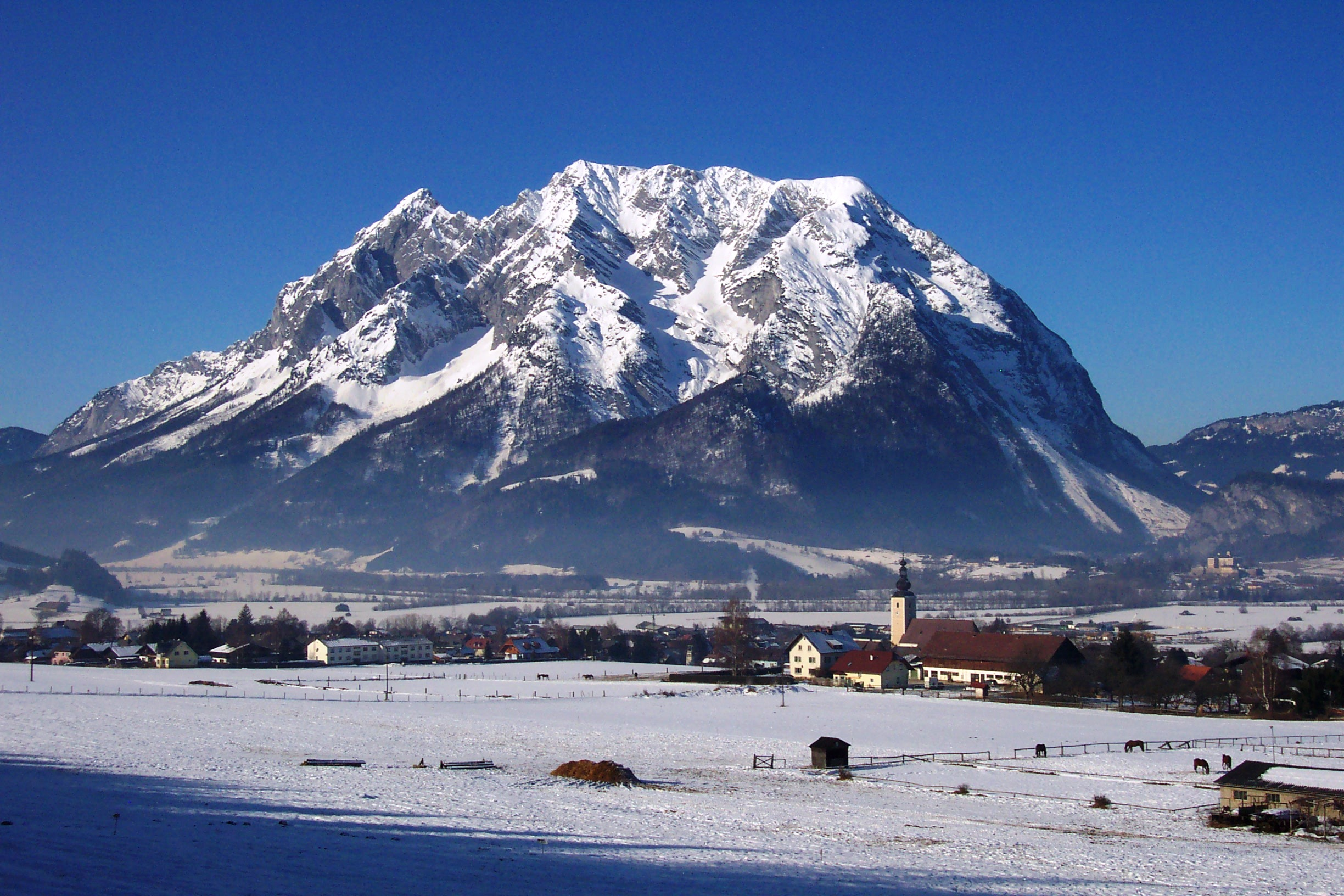
- View of Irdning (in the background with the Grimming mountain)

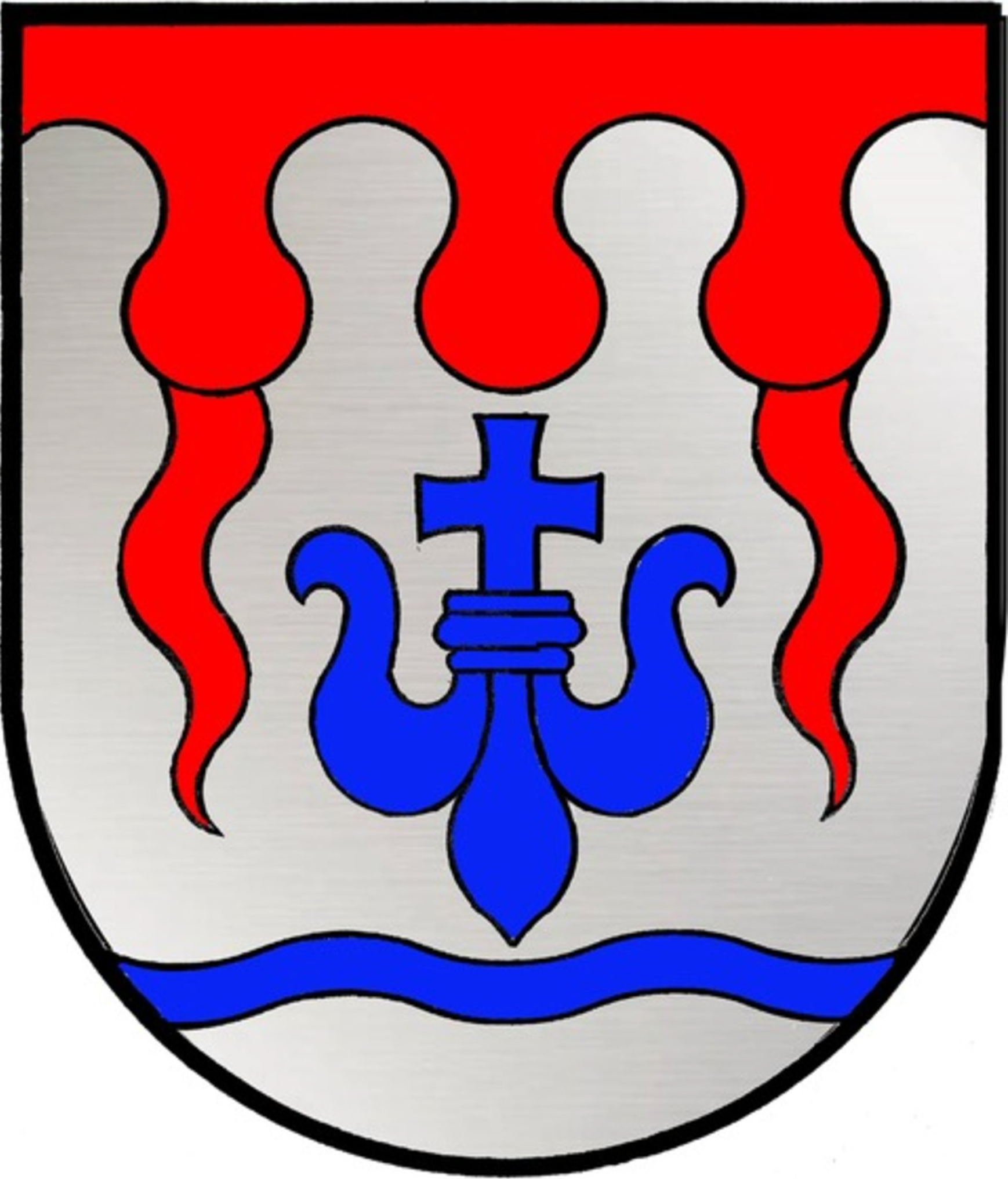
- Coat of arms

- Location within Austria
- Coordinates: 47°30′19.61″N 14°06′14.42″E
- Country: Austria
- State: Styria
- District: Liezen

Government
  - Mayor: Herbert Gugganig (ÖVP)

Area
  - Total: 199.61 km^{2} (77.07 sq mi)

Population (2019-01-01)
  - Total: 4,137
  - Density: 20.73/km^{2} (53.68/sq mi)
- Time zone: UTC+1 (CET)
  - Summer (DST): UTC+2 (CEST)
- Postal code: 8952, 8953
- Area code: +43 3682, 3683
- Vehicle registration: LI
- Website: irdning-donnersbachtal.at

Irdning-Donnersbachtal (German: [ˈɪʁdniŋ ˈdɔnɐsbaxˌtaːl]) is a new municipality since January 2015 with 4,137 residents (as of 1 January 2019) in the Liezen District of Styria, Austria.

The municipality was founded as part of the Styria municipal structural reform, on 31 December 2014, from the dissolved independent municipalities Irdning, Donnersbach und Donnersbachwald.

== Geography ==
=== Municipality arrangement ===
The municipal territory includes the following 15 sections (populations as of 1 January 2015):

- Altirdning (484)
- Bleiberg (112)
- Donnersbach (284)
- Donnersbachwald (311)
- Erlsberg (346)
- Falkenburg (1028)
- Fuchsberg (20)
- Furrach (53)
- Ilgenberg (129)
- Irdning (793)
- Kienach (100)
- Planneralm (23)
- Raumberg (262)
- Ritzenberg (41)
- Winklern (144)

The municipality consists of six Katastralgemeinden: Altirdning, Donnersbach, Donnersbachwald, Erlsberg, Irdning, Raumberg.

=== Tourism ===
The municipality formed, together with Aigen im Ennstal and Wörschach, the tourism agency "Grimming-Donnersbachtal". The base is the town Irdning-Donnersbachtal.
