= Andrea Cibo =

Italian Roman Catholic prelate

Most Reverend Andrea Cibo
- Bishop of Terracina, Priverno e Sezze
- Church: Catholic Church
- Diocese: Diocese of Terracina, Priverno e Sezze
- In office: 1517–1522
- Predecessor: Zaccaria de Moris
- Successor: Giovanni de Copis

Personal details
- Died: 1522

Andrea Cibo or Andrea Cybo (died 1522) was a Roman Catholic prelate who served as Bishop of Terracina, Priverno e Sezze (1517–1522).

== Biography ==
On 20 April 1517, Andrea Cibo was appointed during the papacy of Pope Leo X as Bishop of Terracina, Priverno e Sezze. He served as Bishop of Terracina, Priverno e Sezze until his death in 1522.

== External links and additional sources ==
- Cheney, David M. "Diocese of Latina-Terracina-Sezze-Priverno". Catholic-Hierarchy.org. (for Chronology of Bishops) ^{[self-published]}
- Chow, Gabriel. "Diocese of Latina–Terracina–Sezze–Priverno (Italy)". GCatholic.org. (for Chronology of Bishops) ^{[self-published]}

Catholic Church titles
Preceded by Zaccaria de Moris	Bishop of Terracina, Priverno e Sezze; 1517–1522	Succeeded by Giovanni de Copis
