= Petra Göbel =

Austrian archer (born 1971)

Medal record

Women's archery

Representing Austria

World Field Championships
Bronze medal – third place	2012 Val d'Isere	Individual

World Games
Gold medal – first place	2009 Kaohsiung	Individual

World 3D Championships
Silver medal – second place	2011 Donnersbach	Individual
Bronze medal – third place	2011 Donnersbach	Team

European 3D Championships
Bronze medal – third place	2010 Sassari	Individual
Bronze medal – third place	2010 Sassari	Team

Petra Göbel (born 24 March 1971), is an Austrian athlete who competes in compound archery. She started archery in 1992 and first represented the national senior team in 1996. Her achievements include a silver medal at the 2002 European Grand Prix, a bronze medal at the 2012 World Archery Field Championships and becoming the world number one ranked archer in July 2003.
