= Guglielmo Aretini-Sillani =

Italian Roman Catholic bishop

- Bishop of Terracina, Priverno e Sezze
- Church: Roman Catholic Church
- Diocese: Terracina, Priverno e Sezze
- Installed: 6 April 1835
- Term ended: 4 December 1853
- Predecessor: Bernardino Panzacchi
- Successor: Nicola Bedini

Orders
- Ordination: 12 June 1813
- Consecration: 26 April 1835 by Pietro Francesco Galleffi

Personal details
- Born: 18 August 1786; Sigillo, Papal States

Guglielmo Aretini-Sillani (18 August 1786 – 12 August 1875) was an Italian Roman Catholic bishop.

Ordained to the priesthood on 12 June 1813, Aretini-Sillani was named bishop of the Roman Catholic Diocese of Terracina, Priverno e Sezze, Italy in April 1835 and resigned on 4 December 1853.

== See also ==
- Catholic Church in Italy
