= 2010 European Archery 3D Championships =

Archery competition

- Venue: Parco di Baddimanna
- Location: Sassari, Italy
- Start date: 04 October
- End date: 09 October

The 2010 European Archery 3D Championships took place in Sassari, Italy from 04 to 09 October 2010. These are part of the European Archery Championships organized by World Archery Europe (WAE). The event received a lot of attention thanks to the live broadcast on the national television network RAI, although only the final between Fabio Pittaluga and Enzo Lazzaroni was visible online.

== Medal table ==
* Host nation (Italy)

Rank	Nation	Gold	Silver	Bronze	Total
1	Italy	6	3	1	10
2	France	1	4	1	6
3	Spain	1	1	2	4
3	Sweden	1	1	2	4
5	Austria	1	0	3	4
6	Slovenia	0	1	0	1
7	Belgium	0	0	1	1
Totals (7 entries)		10	10	10	30

== Medal summary ==
=== Elite events ===
Event	Gold	Silver	Bronze
Men's Events
Compound Men's individual	Ilario Munari; Italy	Christofer Herfindal; Sweden	Jari Hjerpe; Sweden
Barebow Men's individual	Giuseppe Seimandi; Italy	Thomas Gutfried; France	August Kerschbacher; Austria
Longbow Men's individual	Paolo Bucci; Italy	Serge Corvino; France	Serge Verrier; Belgium
Instinctive bow Men's individual	Fabio Pittaluga; Italy	Enzo Lazzaroni; Italy	Antonio Hernando Sanchez; Spain
Men's team	Italy; Antonio Pompeo; Paolo Bucci; Giuseppe Seimandi	France; Benoit Girard; Serge Corvino; Corentin Doat	Sweden; Christofer Herfindal; Jan Johansson; Martin Ottosson
Women's Events
Compound Women's individual	Sonia Bianchi; Italy	Dragica Tofaj-Gutman; Slovenia	Petra Goebel; Austria
Barebow Women's individual	Lina Bjorklund; Sweden	Christine Gauthe; France	Chantal Porte; France
Longbow Women's individual	Encarna Garrido Lázaro; Spain	Giulia Barbaro; Italy	Gloria Sangenis Vaque; Spain
Instinctive bow Women's individual	Christa Ocenasek; Austria	Concetta Lementini; Italy	Francesca Capretta; Italy
Women's team	France; Violette Saubion; Daniele Ramos; Chantal Porte	Spain; Shenaida Merida Moreno; Gloria Sangenis Vaque; Anna Muntadas Abanco	Austria; Petra Goebel; Ines Fritz; Andrea Raigel
