= Pomponio de Magistris =

17th-century Roman Catholic bishop

Most Reverend Pomponio de Magistris
- Bishop of Terracina, Priverno e Sezze
- Church: Catholic Church
- Diocese: Diocese of Terracina, Priverno e Sezze
- In office: 1608–1614
- Predecessor: Fabrizio Perugini
- Successor: Cesare Ventimiglia

Orders
- Consecration: 10 Feb 1608 by Mariano Pierbenedetti

Personal details
- Born: Sonnino, Italy
- Died: 1614

Pomponio de Magistris (died 1614) was a Roman Catholic prelate who served as Bishop of Terracina, Priverno e Sezze (1608–1614).

== Biography ==
Pomponio de Magistris was born in Sonnino, Italy. On 28 January 1608, he was appointed during the papacy of Pope Paul V as Bishop of Terracina, Priverno e Sezze. On 10 February 1608, he was consecrated bishop by Mariano Pierbenedetti, Cardinal-Priest of Santa Maria in Trastevere, with Marco Cornaro, Bishop of Padua, and Metello Bichi, Bishop Emeritus of Sovana, serving as co-consecrators. He served as Bishop of Terracina, Priverno e Sezze until his death in 1614.

== External links and additional sources ==
- Cheney, David M. "Diocese of Latina-Terracina-Sezze-Priverno". Catholic-Hierarchy.org. (for Chronology of Bishops) ^{[self-published]}
- Chow, Gabriel. "Diocese of Latina–Terracina–Sezze–Priverno (Italy)". GCatholic.org. (for Chronology of Bishops) ^{[self-published]}

Catholic Church titles
Preceded by Fabrizio Perugini	Bishop of Terracina, Priverno e Sezze; 1608–1614	Succeeded by Cesare Ventimiglia
