= Zaccaria de Moris =

Italian Roman Catholic prelate

Most Reverend Zaccaria de Moris
- Bishop of Terracina, Priverno e Sezze
- Church: Catholic Church
- Diocese: Diocese of Terracina, Priverno e Sezze
- In office: 1510–1517?
- Predecessor: Oliviero Carafa
- Successor: Andrea Cibo

Personal details
- Died: 1517?

Zaccaria de Moris (died 1517) was a Roman Catholic prelate who served as Bishop of Terracina, Priverno e Sezze (1510–1517).

== Biography ==
On 13 May 1510, Zaccaria de Moris was appointed by Pope Julius II as Bishop of Terracina, Priverno e Sezze. He served as Bishop of Terracina, Priverno e Sezze until his death, perhaps in 1517.

== External links and additional sources ==
- Cheney, David M. "Diocese of Latina-Terracina-Sezze-Priverno". Catholic-Hierarchy.org. (for Chronology of Bishops) ^{[self-published]}
- Chow, Gabriel. "Diocese of Latina–Terracina–Sezze–Priverno (Italy)". GCatholic.org. (for Chronology of Bishops) ^{[self-published]}

Catholic Church titles
Preceded by Oliviero Carafa	Bishop of Terracina, Priverno e Sezze; 1510–1517	Succeeded by Andrea Cibo
