= Borgo San Michele =

Coordinates: 41.4383°N 12.9735°E

Borgo San Michele is one of the frazioni of Latina, Lazio situated over eight kilometres from the provincial capital Latina. Its population was 1971 in 2013.

== History ==
Borgo San Michele was founded as a "Workers' Village in Capograssa" in 1928 by the Piscinara land reclamation consortium in the Scopeti area and the Picarello marshes.
