= Cinzio Filonardi =

Roman Catholic prelate

Most Reverend Cinzio Filonardi
- Bishop of Terracina, Priverno e Sezze
- Church: Catholic Church
- Diocese: Diocese of Terracina, Priverno e Sezze
- In office: 1533–1534
- Predecessor: Antonio Bonsius
- Successor: Cipriano de Caris

Personal details
- Died: November 1534

Cinzio Filonardi (died 1534) was a Roman Catholic prelate who served as Bishop of Terracina, Priverno e Sezze (1533–1534).

== Biography ==
On 7 November 1533, Cinzio Filonardi was appointed during the papacy of Pope Clement VII as Bishop of Terracina, Priverno e Sezze. He served as Bishop of Terracina, Priverno e Sezze until his death in November 1534.

== External links and additional sources ==
- Cheney, David M. "Diocese of Latina-Terracina-Sezze-Priverno". Catholic-Hierarchy.org. (for Chronology of Bishops) ^{[self-published]}
- Chow, Gabriel. "Diocese of Latina–Terracina–Sezze–Priverno (Italy)". GCatholic.org. (for Chronology of Bishops) ^{[self-published]}

Catholic Church titles
Preceded by Antonio Bonsius	Bishop of Terracina, Priverno e Sezze; 1533–1534	Succeeded by Cipriano de Caris
