= Cipriano de Caris =

Roman Catholic prelate

Most Reverend Cinzio Filonardi
- Bishop of Terracina, Priverno e Sezze
- Church: Catholic Church
- Diocese: Diocese of Terracina, Priverno e Sezze
- In office: 1534
- Predecessor: Cinzio Filonardi
- Successor: Alessandro Argoli

Personal details
- Died: 1534

Cinzio Filonardi (died 1534) was a Roman Catholic prelate who served as Bishop of Terracina, Priverno e Sezze (1534).

== Biography ==
In 1534, Cinzio Filonardi was appointed during the papacy of Pope Clement VII as Bishop of Terracina, Priverno e Sezze. He served as Bishop of Terracina, Priverno e Sezze until his death in the same year.

De Caris served for only forty days, according to Orlandi, p. 60. Eubel, Hierarchia catholica III, p. 310, states that Filonardi died in November 1534, and that his successor Argoli was appointed on 13 November 1534; this leaves no room for De Caris. An addition to Ferdinando Ughelli, Italia sacra (Venice 1717) I, p. 1300, states that De Caris was appointed on 13 November and that Argoli was appointed on 23 November, likewise leaving no room for Orlandi's forty-day reign.

== External links and additional sources ==
- Cheney, David M. "Diocese of Latina-Terracina-Sezze-Priverno". Catholic-Hierarchy.org. (for Chronology of Bishops) ^{[self-published]}
- Chow, Gabriel. "Diocese of Latina–Terracina–Sezze–Priverno (Italy)". GCatholic.org. (for Chronology of Bishops) ^{[self-published]}

Catholic Church titles
Preceded by Cinzio Filonardi	Bishop of Terracina, Priverno e Sezze; 1534	Succeeded by Alessandro Argoli
