= Ottaviano (disambiguation) =

Ottaviano is a municipality in the Metropolitan City of Naples, Italy. Ottaviano may also refer to:

== People ==
- Ottaviano (name), an Italian given name and surname, includes a list of people with that name

== Places ==
- Ottaviano – San Pietro – Musei Vaticani, a metro station in Rome

== Other ==
- Christy Ottaviano Books, a book imprint
- Cinsaut, a grape variety also known as Ottaviano
- Italian cruiser Ottaviano Augusto
