= Antonio Bonsius =

Italian Roman Catholic prelate

Most Reverend Antonio Bonsius
- Bishop of Terracina, Priverno e Sezze
- Church: Catholic Church
- Diocese: Diocese of Terracina, Priverno e Sezze
- In office: 1528–1533
- Predecessor: Giovanni de Copis
- Successor: Cinzio Filonardi

Personal details
- Died: 1533

Antonio Bonsius (died 1533) was a Roman Catholic prelate who served as Bishop of Terracina, Priverno e Sezze (1528–1533).

== Biography ==
On 3 January 1528, Antonio Bonsius was appointed during the papacy of Pope Clement VII as Bishop of Terracina, Priverno e Sezze. He served as Bishop of Terracina, Priverno e Sezze until his death in 1533.

== External links and additional sources ==
- Cheney, David M. "Diocese of Latina-Terracina-Sezze-Priverno". Catholic-Hierarchy.org. (for Chronology of Bishops) ^{[self-published]}
- Chow, Gabriel. "Diocese of Latina–Terracina–Sezze–Priverno (Italy)". GCatholic.org. (for Chronology of Bishops) ^{[self-published]}

Catholic Church titles
Preceded by Giovanni de Copis	Bishop of Terracina, Priverno e Sezze; 1528–1533	Succeeded by Cinzio Filonardi
