= Irdning =

- Former municipality
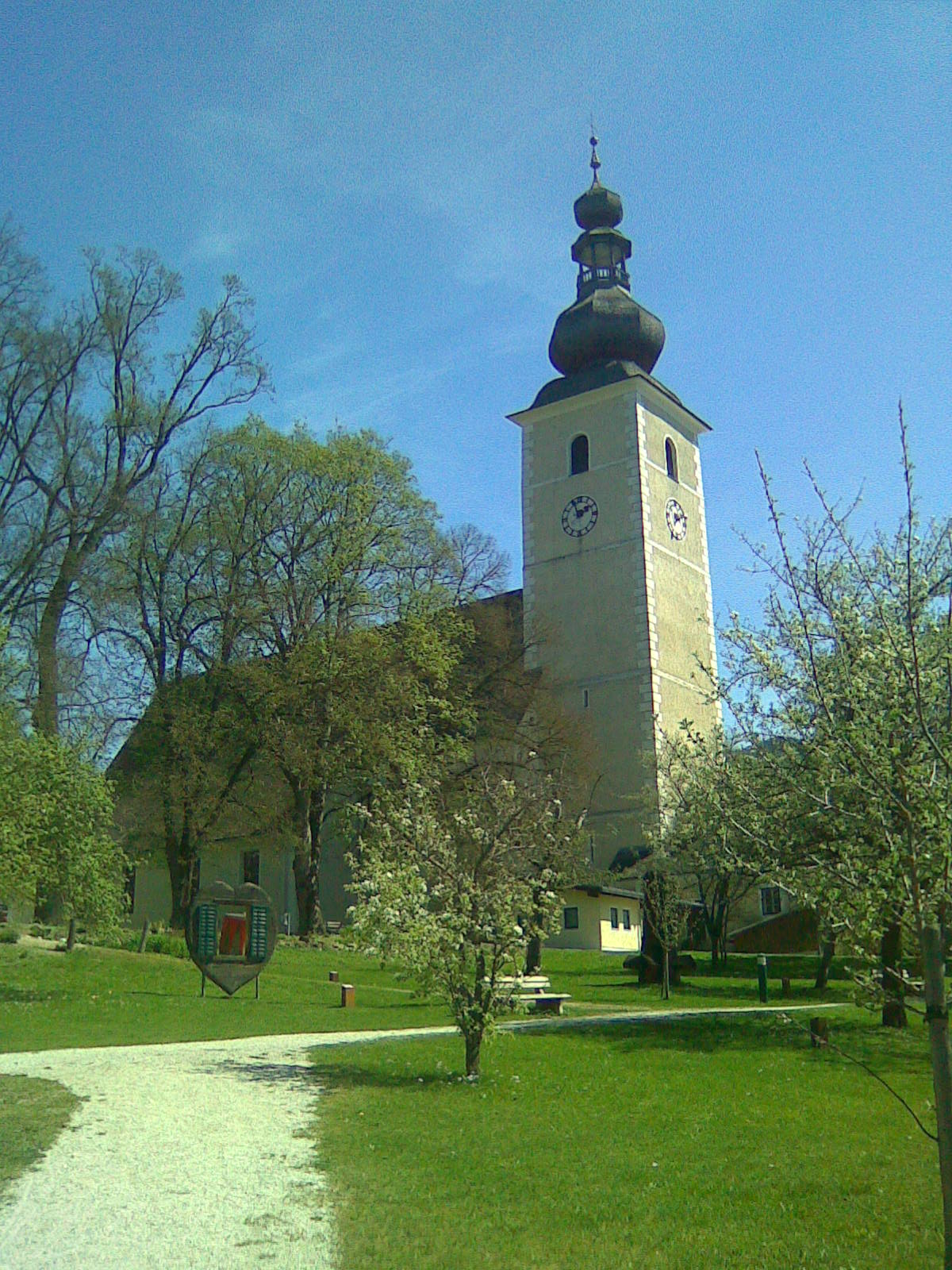

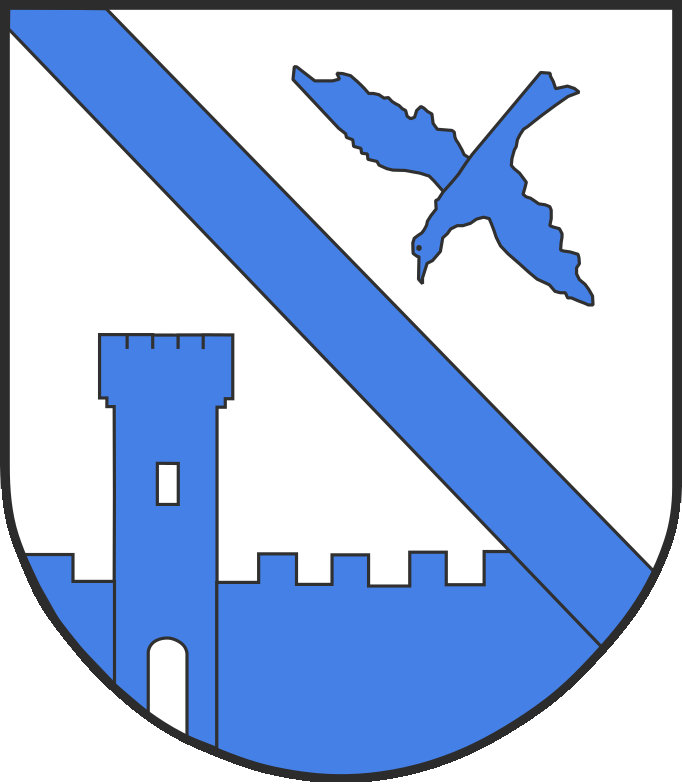
- Coat of arms

- Location within Austria
- Coordinates: 47°30′00″N 14°06′00″E
- Country: Austria
- State: Styria
- District: Liezen

Area
  - Total: 21.95 km^{2} (8.47 sq mi)
- Elevation: 673 m (2,208 ft)

Population (1 January 2016)
  - Total: 2,749
  - Density: 125.2/km^{2} (324.4/sq mi)
- Time zone: UTC+1 (CET)
  - Summer (DST): UTC+2 (CEST)
- Postal code: 8952
- Area code: 03682
- Vehicle registration: LI
- Website: www.irdning.at

Irdning is a former municipality in the district of Liezen in the Austrian state of Styria. Since the 2015 Styria municipal structural reform, it is part of the municipality Irdning-Donnersbachtal.

== Geography ==
Irdning is located about 12 miles (19 km) southwest of Liezen in Ennstal, at an altitude of 645 metres (2,116 ft) to 1,450 metres (4,760 ft) above sea level, with the main village located at an altitude of 673 metres (2,208 ft).

== History ==
The origins of the market town is unknown, due to a lack of documents. It is thought that the first settlers were subjected to a tax from a local Prince, and that it refers to the interest rate payable. These farms were handed down through the generations, locally referred to locally as yards, with locals later referred to as the Lords of Irdning.

The name Irdning (Idenich, Ydnich) is first mentioned in 1140, and the parish church was then mentioned as such in 1145. The market started in 1564 at the request of the ruler Selva Ferdinand Hoffman. Since 1689 it has been the seat of the provincial court Selva Irdning.

On 1 January 1960 the municipality of Irdning was united at the decree of Governor Josef Krainer. The municipality has been twinned with Ahorn, Bavaria in Germany since 1975.

== Population ==
Historical population
Year	Pop.	±%
1961	2,048	—
1971	2,306	+12.6%
1981	2,299	−0.3%
1991	2,490	+8.3%
2001	2,632	+5.7%
2011	2,721	+3.4%

== Religion ==
The pastor of Irdning from 1455 to 1458 was Silvio Piccolomini, from Siena. On August 27, 1458, he was elected Pope Pius II.

== Local attractions ==
- Castle Falkenburg: built 1615 as a hunting lodge by Hans Praunfalk, instead of a farm. Since 1711 the tower is a Capuchin monastery
- Castle Gumpenstein: built 1616 by builder of Stainach Moritz, also in lieu of a farm
- Parish Church of Irdning: first mentioned in 1145, the mainly Gothic parish church, is dedicated to St. Peter and Paul. The central importance of the two patron saints is reflected in the high altarpiece, a typical example of Baroque religious art of Carl Philipp leaf-sweeper from Graz in 1752. It represents the kiss of peace between the two rounds, the bye before their martyrdom in Rome from each other. Outside the church there is a war memorial for the 105 Irdning victims of World War I, and of the 167 victims of the Second World War. The victims of the Aigen im Ennstal are also listed
- Sculpture Park Irdning: wood and stone sculptures of national and international artists

== Sport ==
Due to its altitude and remote but easy to access location, Irdning has been regularly used by football teams for training camp purposes. These have included Real Madrid (2008), Fulham F.C., Red Bull Salzburg, Stoke City, AS Roma, Everton F.C. and VfB Stuttgart. The England national football team trained here before the 2010 World Cup. Thousands of spectators come each time in order to request autographs from the players and watch the training.

In 2018, Everton trained in Irdning and played a friendly match against local side ATV Irdning. The Toffees won 22–0.

In close proximity to Irdning there are several ski resorts, including the Planneralm (the highest ski resort in Styria), the Riesneralm and Tauplitzalm. Other winter sports include cross-country skiing and curling. In the summer, the golf course of the hotel Schloss Pichlarn can be used. Swimming facilities are also available in the villages man-made pond, and the Putterersee in neighboring Aigen im Ennstal .

Irdning has a year-round beach volleyball court, a tennis complex, two horse riding academies, an inline skate track, an athletics track, and asphalt curling.

== People from Irdning ==
- Alois Pachernegg (1892–1964): Austrian conductor and composer
- Hubert Friedrich Hirscher (1951–): Austrian author, freelance journalist
- Bruno Jaschke (1958–): Austrian writer and journalist
