= Roman Catholic Diocese of Sezze =

The Diocese of Sezze was a Latin Catholic bishopric with see in Sezze, in the Province of Latina, central Italy, about 65 kilometres (40 mi) south of Rome and 10 kilometres (6 mi) from the Mediterranean coast.

== History ==
The Diocese of Sezze was established in 790 AD.

Its cathedral was built on the ruins of a Roman pagan temple.

From 17 January 1217 it was in personal union (aeque principaliter) with the Diocese of Terracina, until both sees saw their titles and territories merged on 1986.09.30 into the Diocese of Latina–Terracina–Sezze–Priverno.

== Episcopal ordinaries ==
(all Roman Rite)

Suffragan Bishops of Sezze

- Stefano (1036 – ?)
- Pollidio (1046 – ?)
- Drusino (1118 – ?)
- Alessandro (1122 – ?)
- Landone (1179 – 1180)
- Ugone (1180 – 1195), already Bishop of Terracina (Italy) (1168 – 1195), also Bishop of Priverno (Italy) (1180 – 1195)
- Tedelgario (1195 – 1203), also Bishop of Terracina (Italy) (1195 – 1203) and Bishop of Priverno (Italy) (1195 – 1203)
- Simeone (1203 – 1224), Bishop of Terracina (Italy) (1203 – 1224) and Bishop of Priverno (Italy) (1203 – 1224)

For further incumbents from 1217, see Diocese of Terracina, being identical due to personal union of their sees.
