= Ottaviano da Faenza =

Italian painter (14th-century)

Ottaviano da Faenza was an Italian painter of the 14th century who was instructed by Giotto. He spent the greater part of his life at Faenza, where he died. Several paintings attributed to him can be found in Faenza and Bologna.
