= Ottaviano Menni =

Italian mathematician

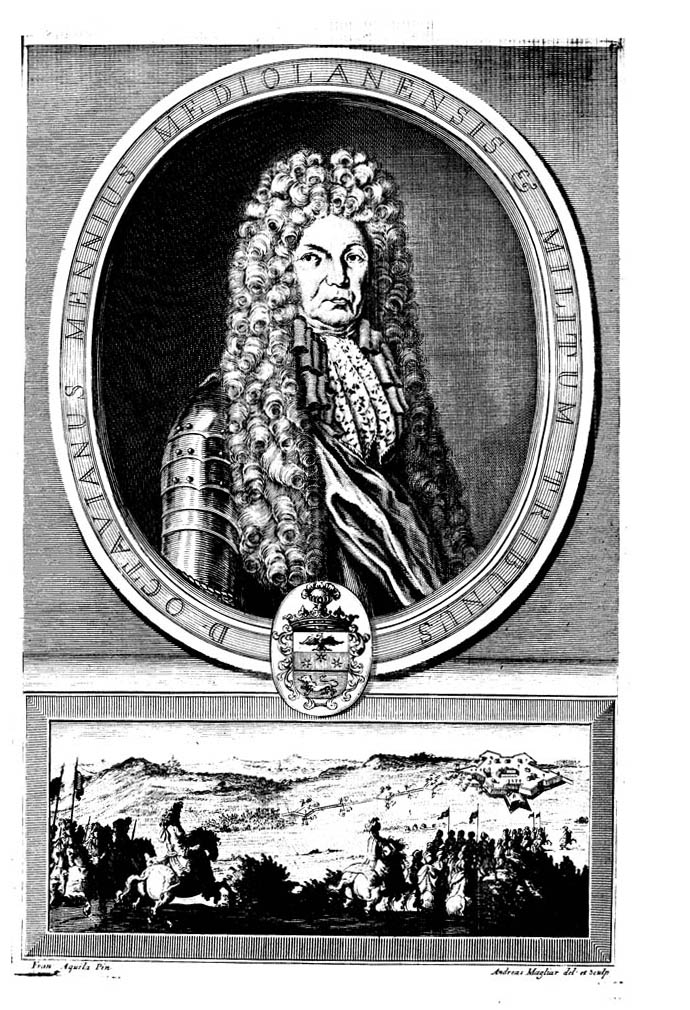
Ottaviano Menni

Ottaviano Menni was an Italian mathematician and mestre de camp who lived between the 17th and 18th centuries.

== Works ==
- Amussis munitoria (in Latin). Naples: Giovanni Roselli. 1702.
