= Octavien de Guasco =

Octavien de Guasco (22 February 1712 – 10 March 1781), Count of Clavières, was an Italian writer and translator.

== Life ==
He was born Giovanni Battista Ottaviano Guasco in Bricherasio (Vapereau has Pignerol) (either way then within the limits of the domain of the Savoyard state, to Francesco Bartolomeo de Guasco (1675–1742) and Maria Anna Margherita Turinetti (1685–1733). His father belonged to a cadet branch of an ancient family of Alessandria (see Genealogy of the Guasco family), and was jurisconsult and intendant to Victor Amadeus II of Savoy. His mother was of the family of the marquises of Priero and Pancalieri. He was the fourth of sixth children — three boys and three girls — his elder brother being Francesco Guasco (1708–1763) and his younger brother being Pier Alessandro Guasco (1714–1780).

He entered holy orders and in 1751 was granted a rich canonicate at Tournai.

He lived some years in Paris, where he was linked with the Lumières and with the salon of Madame de Tencin; he was on close terms with Montesquieu, and highly esteemed by Lord Chesterfield and by Claude Adrien Helvétius. In 1750 he was elected to the Académie des Inscriptions et Belles-Lettres (as an associé libre); he was also a member of the Royal Society of London, the Etruscan Academy of Cortona, and the National Academy of Bordeaux.

In his Lettres familières du président de Montesquieu (1767), Guasco published a selection of his personal correspondence; this embroiled him with Madame Geoffrin and her social circle.

One of his relatives, the marquis Francesco-Eugenio de Guasco (born 1720 in Alessandria), was also known in Italy for some literary works.

Octavien de Guasco died at Verona in 1781.

== Works ==
- Dissertations historiques, politiques et littéraires (2 volumes, published 1756 in Tournai)
- Lettres familières du président de Montesquieu à divers amis d'Italie (published 1767 in Florence)
- De l'usage des statues chez les Anciens (published 1768 in Brussels)
- Italian translations (from the French) of Montesquieu's The Spirit of Laws, Cantemir's History of the Ottomans, etc.
