= Ottaviano Maria Sforza =

Roman Catholic Church Bishop

Most Reverend Ottaviano Maria Sforza
- Bishop of Terracina, Priverno e Sezze; Titular Patriarch of Alexandria
- Church: Catholic Church
- Diocese: Diocese of Terracina, Priverno e Sezze
- In office: 1541–1545
- Predecessor: Alessandro Argoli
- Successor: Ottaviano della Raverta
- Previous posts: Bishop of Lodi (1497–1499, 1512–1519 and 1527–1530); Bishop of Arezzo (1519–1525)

Personal details
- Born: 1475 Milan, Italy
- Died: 1545 (age 70)

Ottaviano Maria Sforza (1475–1545) was a Roman Catholic prelate who served as Bishop of Arezzo (1519–1525), Bishop of Lodi (1497–1499, 1512–1519 and 1527–1530), and Titular Patriarch of Alexandria (1541–1545) and Bishop of Terracina, Priverno e Sezze (1541–1545).

== Biography ==
Ottaviano Maria Sforza was born in Milan, Italy in 1475, the son of Duke Galeazzo Maria Sforza and his mistress Lucia Marliani.

On 27 October 1497, he was appointed during the papacy of Pope Alexander VI as Bishop of Lodi. His title was more than pastoral and he used his position to secure funding and troops for the expeditions of his uncle Ludovico il Moro.

In 1499, he was forced to resign as Bishop of Lodi after the French conquest of Milan by Louis XII. The Frenchman Claude de Seyssel (Claudio Sassatelli) was appointed as administrator in his place in 1501. In 1512, he was again reappointed as Bishop of Lodi by Pope Julius II after the expulsion of the French from Italy.

He was once again forced from the bishopric in 1515 after the Duke of Milan Massimiliano Sforza and the Bishop of Sion, Matthäus Schiner, suspected him of collaborating with the French; others contend that it was jealousy on the part of Duke Massimiliano Sforza. Fleeing to Germany, he returned to Italy in 1519. On 19 November 1519, he was appointed Bishop of Arezzo by Pope Leo X(switching places with Gerolamo Sansoni), where he served until his resignation in 1525.

In 1527, he returned to Lodi, this time as the head of a band of mercenary troops where he helped to secure Milanese control of the city from the Venetians (who had seized it from the Holy Roman Emperor, Charles V in 1526). He also regained the bishopric of Lodi, serving until his resignation in 1530 (some sources state he served from 1525-1531). His successor was again Gerolamo Sansoni.

He retired to Milan where after the death of the Duke of Milan, he unsuccessfully sought the ducal throne. Thereafter he moved to Murano.

On 20 May 1541, he was appointed Bishop of Terracina, Priverno e Sezze and Titular Patriarch of Alexandria by Pope Paul III. He served as Bishop of Terracina, Priverno e Sezze until his death in 1545 (some sources say 1540 or 1541).

== External links and additional sources ==
- Cheney, David M. "Diocese of Lodi". Catholic-Hierarchy.org. (for Chronology of Bishops) ^{[self-published]}
- Chow, Gabriel. "Diocese of Lodi (Italy)". GCatholic.org. (for Chronology of Bishops) ^{[self-published]}
- Cheney, David M. "Diocese of Latina-Terracina-Sezze-Priverno". Catholic-Hierarchy.org. (for Chronology of Bishops) ^{[self-published]}
- Chow, Gabriel. "Diocese of Latina–Terracina–Sezze–Priverno (Italy)". GCatholic.org. (for Chronology of Bishops) ^{[self-published]}
- Cheney, David M. "Alexandria {Alessandria} (Titular See)". Catholic-Hierarchy.org. (for Chronology of Bishops) ^{[self-published]}
- Chow, Gabriel. "Titular Patriarchal See of Alexandria (Egypt)". GCatholic.org. (for Chronology of Bishops) ^{[self-published]}

Catholic Church titles
Preceded by Carlo Pallavicino (bishop)	Bishop of Lodi; 1497–1499 (1st time)	Succeeded by Claude de Seyssel
Preceded by Claude de Seyssel	Bishop of Lodi; 1512–1519 (2nd time)	Succeeded by Gerolamo Sansoni
Preceded by Gerolamo Sansoni	Bishop of Arezzo; 1519–1525	Succeeded by Francesco Minerbetti
Preceded by Gerolamo Sansoni	Bishop of Lodi; 1527–1530 (3rd time)	Succeeded by Gerolamo Sansoni
Preceded by Alessandro Argoli	Bishop of Terracina, Priverno e Sezze; 1541–1545	Succeeded by Ottaviano della Raverta
Preceded by Alessandro di Sangro	Titular Patriarch of Alexandria; 1541–1545	Succeeded by Federico Borromeo
