= Juan Gálvez (bishop) =

Roman Catholic bishop

Most Reverend Juan Galvez
- Bishop of Terracina, Priverno e Sezze
- Church: Catholic Church
- Diocese: Diocese of Terracina, Priverno e Sezze
- In office: 1500–1507
- Predecessor: Francesco Rosa (bishop)
- Successor: Oliviero Carafa

Personal details
- Born: Seville, Spain
- Died: 8 August 1507

Juan Gálvez (died 1507) was a Roman Catholic prelate who served as Bishop of Terracina, Priverno e Sezze (1500–1507).

== Biography ==
Juan Galvez was a native of Seville, Spain. He was born in 1439, in October, probably on the 20th. He was a Doctor in utroque iure, and a protege of Cardinal Oliviero Carafa. He was appointed President of the Apostolic Camera. He was a writer of papal bulls (scriptor apostolicarum bullarum), for whose services substantial fees were due from the intended recipients; he rose to be Master of the Registry of papal bulls.

On 18 December 1500, he was appointed by Pope Alexander VI as Bishop of Terracina, Priverno e Sezze. The right to appoint the bishop of Terracina was reserved to the pope by John XXII and all of his successors. Terracina, moreover, was hierarchically directly dependent upon the Holy See (Papacy). Galvez served as Bishop of Terracina, Priverno e Sezze until his death on (according to David Cheney) 8 August 1507.

According to his tombstone, he died on "viii Id. Aug. MDVII", that is, 6 August 1507.

== Sources and external links ==
- Eubel, Conradus, ed. (1914). Hierarchia catholica (in Latin). Vol. Tomus 2 (second ed.). Münster: Libreria Regensbergiana. p. 248.
- Ughelli, Ferdinando; Coleti, Niccolò (1717). Italia sacra sive De Episcopis Italiae, et insularum adjacentium (in Latin). Vol. Tomus primus (1) (editio secunda, aucta et emendata ed.). Venice: apud Sebastianum Coleti. pp. 1298=1299.
- Cheney, David M. "Diocese of Latina-Terracina-Sezze-Priverno". Catholic-Hierarchy.org. (for Chronology of Bishops) ^{[self-published]}
- Chow, Gabriel. "Diocese of Latina–Terracina–Sezze–Priverno (Italy)". GCatholic.org. (for Chronology of Bishops) ^{[self-published]}

Catholic Church titles
Preceded by Francesco Rosa (bishop)	Bishop of Terracina, Priverno e Sezze; 1500–1507	Succeeded by Oliviero Carafa
