= Ottaviano Raverta =

Italian Roman Catholic prelate

Most Reverend Ottaviano della Raverta
- Bishop of Terracina, Priverno e Sezze
- Church: Catholic Church
- Diocese: Diocese of Terracina, Priverno e Sezze
- In office: 1545–1561
- Predecessor: Ottaviano Maria Sforza
- Successor: Francesco Beltramini
- Previous posts: Apostolic Nuncio to Switzerland (1560 and 1561); Apostolic Nuncio to Spain (1553-1560)

Personal details
- Died: October 1561

Ottaviano della Raverta or Ottaviano della Rovere (died 1561) was a Roman Catholic prelate who served as Bishop of Terracina, Priverno e Sezze (1545–1561), twice the Apostolic Nuncio to Spain (1560 and 1561), and Apostolic Nuncio to Switzerland (1553–1560).

== Biography ==
On 27 November 1545, Ottaviano della Raverta was appointed during the papacy of Pope Paul III as Bishop of Terracina, Priverno e Sezze. In 1553, he was appointed during the papacy of Pope Julius III as Apostolic Nuncio to Switzerland; he resigned on 28 November 1560. In Jun 1561, he was appointed Apostolic Nuncio to Spain and resigned soon after in Oct 1561. On 10 March 1560, he was once again appointed during the papacy of Pope Pius IV as Apostolic Nuncio to Spain; he resigned in October 1561. He served as Bishop of Terracina, Priverno e Sezze until his death in October 1561.

== External links and additional sources ==
- Cheney, David M. "Nunciature to Switzerland". Catholic-Hierarchy.org. (for Chronology of Bishops) ^{[self-published]}
- Chow, Gabriel. "Apostolic Nunciature Switzerland". GCatholic.org. Archived from the original on October 21, 2015. (for Chronology of Bishops) ^{[self-published]}
- Cheney, David M. "Nunciature to Spain". Catholic-Hierarchy.org. (for Chronology of Bishops) ^{[self-published]}
- Chow, Gabriel. "Apostolic Nunciature Spain". GCatholic.org. (for Chronology of Bishops) ^{[self-published]}
- Cheney, David M. "Diocese of Latina-Terracina-Sezze-Priverno". Catholic-Hierarchy.org. (for Chronology of Bishops) ^{[self-published]}
- Chow, Gabriel. "Diocese of Latina–Terracina–Sezze–Priverno (Italy)". GCatholic.org. (for Chronology of Bishops) ^{[self-published]}

Catholic Church titles
Preceded by Paolo Odescalchi	Apostolic Nuncio to Switzerland; 1553–1560	Succeeded by Giovanni Antonio Volpi
Preceded by Salvatore Pacini	Apostolic Nuncio to Spain; 1560 (1st time)	Succeeded by Giovanni Campeggi
Preceded by Giovanni Campeggi	Apostolic Nuncio to Spain; 1561 (2nd time)	Succeeded by Giovanni Battista Castagna
Preceded by Ottaviano Maria Sforza	Bishop of Terracina, Priverno e Sezze; 1545–1561	Succeeded by Francesco Beltramini
