= Alessandro Argoli (bishop of Terracina) =

Italian Roman Catholic prelate

Most Reverend Alessandro Argoli
- Bishop of Terracina, Priverno e Sezze
- Church: Catholic Church
- Diocese: Diocese of Terracina, Priverno e Sezze
- In office: 1534–1540
- Predecessor: Cipriano de Caris
- Successor: Ottaviano Maria Sforza

Personal details
- Died: 1540

Alessandro Argoli (died 1540) was a Roman Catholic prelate who served as Bishop of Terracina, Priverno e Sezze (1534–1540).

== Biography ==
On 13 November 1534, Alessandro Argoli was appointed during the papacy of Pope Paul III as Bishop of Terracina, Priverno e Sezze. He served as Bishop of Terracina, Priverno e Sezze until his death in 1540.

== External links and additional sources ==
- Cheney, David M. "Diocese of Latina-Terracina-Sezze-Priverno". Catholic-Hierarchy.org. (for Chronology of Bishops) ^{[self-published]}
- Chow, Gabriel. "Diocese of Latina–Terracina–Sezze–Priverno (Italy)". GCatholic.org. (for Chronology of Bishops) ^{[self-published]}

Catholic Church titles
Preceded by Cipriano de Caris	Bishop of Terracina, Priverno e Sezze; 1534–1540	Succeeded by Ottaviano Maria Sforza
