= Donnersbach =

- Former municipality
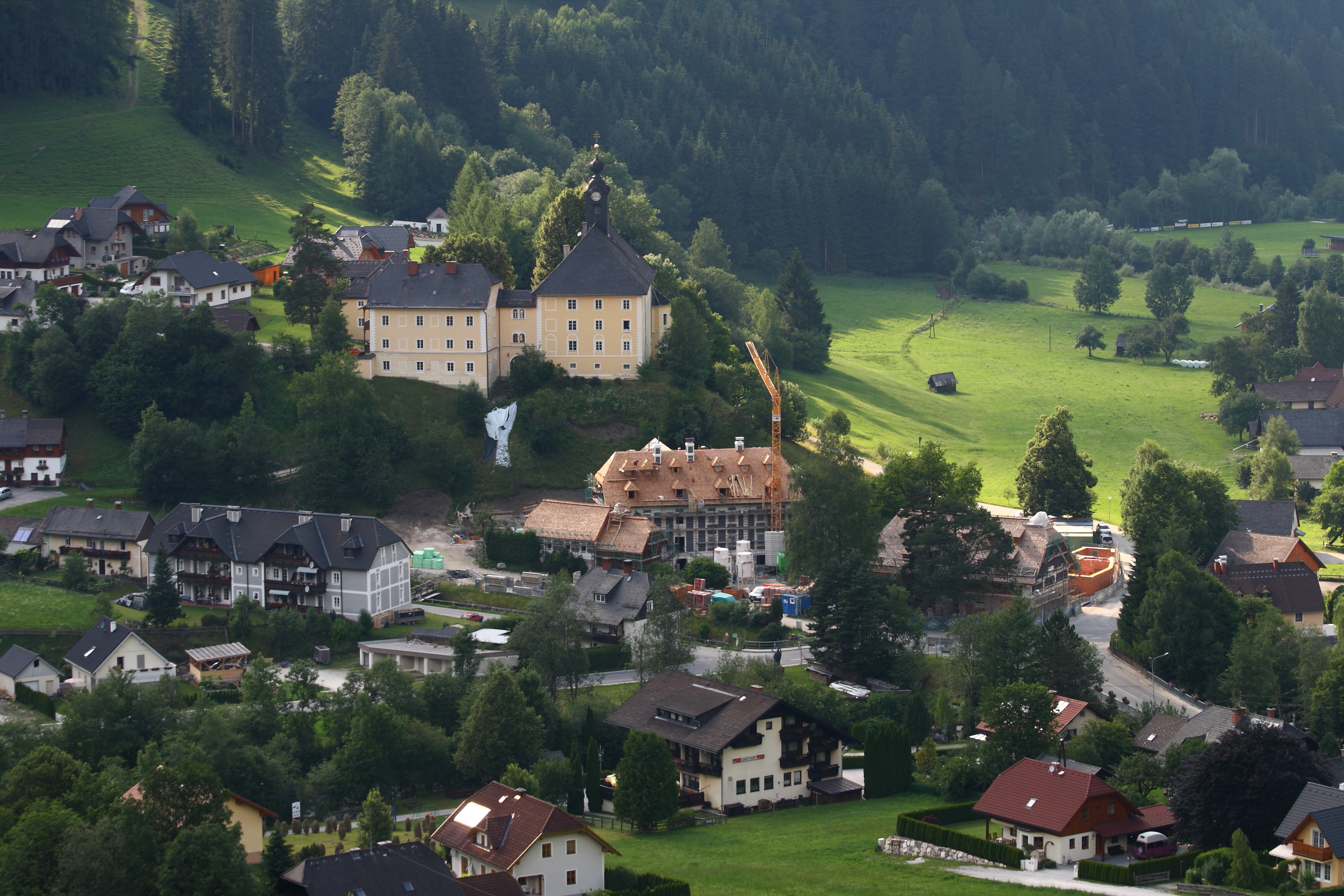
- View of Donnersbach

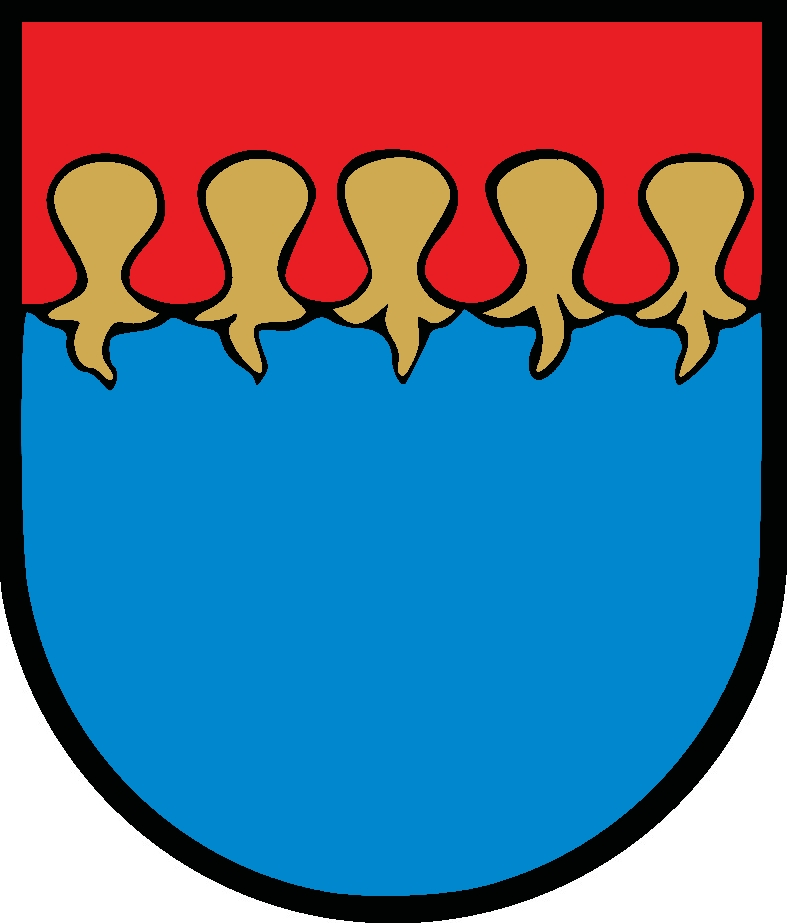
- Coat of arms

- Location within Austria
- Coordinates: 47°27′53″N 14°07′34″E
- Country: Austria
- State: Styria
- District: Liezen

Area
  - Total: 63.35 km^{2} (24.46 sq mi)
- Elevation: 713 m (2,339 ft)

Population (1 January 2016)
  - Total: 1,085
  - Density: 17.13/km^{2} (44.36/sq mi)
- Time zone: UTC+1 (CET)
  - Summer (DST): UTC+2 (CEST)
- Postal code: 8953
- Area code: 03683
- Vehicle registration: LI
- Website: www.donnersbach.at

Donnersbach is a former municipality in the district of Liezen in the Austrian state of Styria. Since the 2015 Styria municipal structural reform, it is part of the municipality Irdning-Donnersbachtal.

== Geography ==
Donnersbach lies in a southern tributary valley of the Enns in the Niederen Tauern.
