= Latina, Lazio =

Latina
- Comune
- Comune di Latina
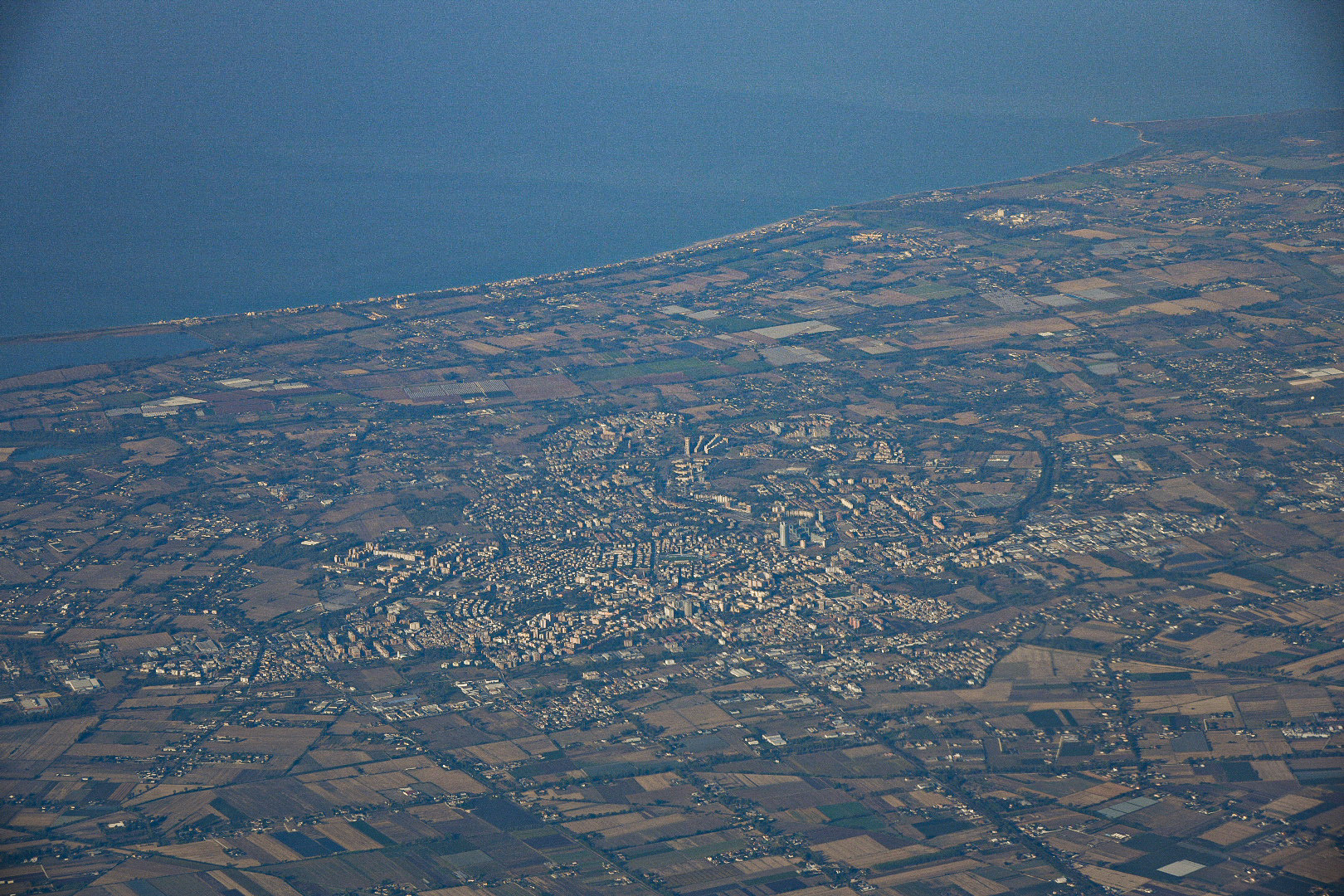
- Aerial view of Latina

- Flag Coat of arms

- Location within Italy Location within Lazio
- Coordinates: 41°28′02″N 12°54′13″E
- Country: Italy
- Region: Lazio
- Province: Latina (LT)
- Frazioni: See list

Government
  - Mayor: Matilde Celentano (Fdl)

Area
  - Total: 277.62 km^{2} (107.19 sq mi)
- Elevation: 21 m (69 ft)

Population (2026)
  - Total: 127,450
  - Density: 459.08/km^{2} (1,189.0/sq mi)
- Demonym: Latinensi
- Time zone: UTC+1 (CET)
  - Summer (DST): UTC+2 (CEST)
- Postal code: 04100, 04010, 04013
- Dialing code: 0773
- ISTAT code: 059011
- Patron saint: Saint Maria Goretti and St. Mark
- Saint day: April 25, July 6
- Website: Official website

Latina (Italian: [laˈtiːna]) is the capital of the province of Latina, in the region of Lazio in Italy. As of 2024, with a population of 127,450, it is the 30th-largest city in Italy, as well as the 2nd-largest city in the region, after the national capital Rome.

It is one of the youngest cities in Italy, being founded as Littoria in 1932 under the fascist administration, when the area surrounding it which had been a swamp since antiquity was drained.

== History ==
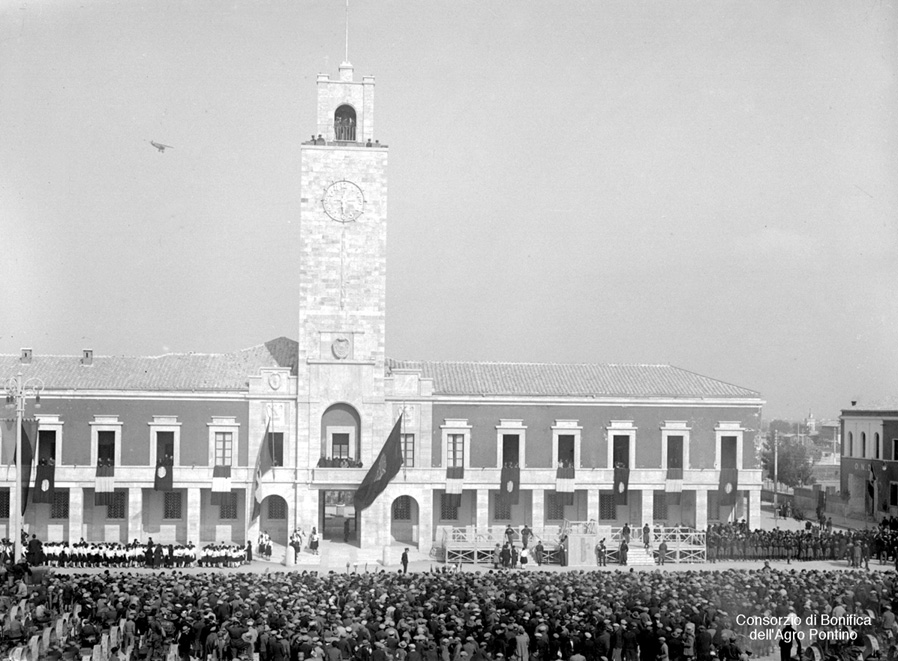
The inauguration of Littoria in 1932

Although the area was first settled by the Latins, the modern city was founded by Benito Mussolini on 30 June 1932 as Littoria, named for the fascio littorio. The city was inaugurated on 18 December of the same year, 171 days only to build up. Littoria was populated with settlers coming mainly from Friuli and Veneto, who formed the so-called Venetian-Pontine community (today surviving only in some peripheral boroughs). The edifices and the monuments, mainly in rationalist style, were designed by famous architects and artists such as Marcello Piacentini, Angiolo Mazzoni and Duilio Cambellotti.

In 1934 it became a provincial capital and, after World War II, renamed Latina in 1946. With the arrival of other people mostly from Lazio itself, the original Venetian-like dialect was increasingly substituted by a form of Romanesco dialect.

The city coat of arms is a blue shield with a stylized drawing of the City Hall Clock Tower in the middle, standing on a field of green, and flanked by two stalks of wheat tied at the base with a red ribbon engraved with the motto LATINA OLIM PALUS ("Latina, once a swamp") in Latin. The shield is surmounted by a mural crown.

== Geography ==
Latina is located in the province of Latina, part of the southern section of the region of Lazio. The city is about 62 km (39 mi) south of Rome The municipality borders on Aprilia, Cisterna di Latina, Nettuno, Pontinia, Sabaudia, Sermoneta and Sezze.

=== Climate ===
Latina has a Mediterranean climate (Köppen climate classification Csa) like most of southern Italy.

Climate data for Latina
Month	Jan	Feb	Mar	Apr	May	Jun	Jul	Aug	Sep	Oct	Nov	Dec	Year
Mean daily maximum °C (°F)	14.2 (57.6)	15.1 (59.2)	18.1 (64.6)	22.0 (71.6)	24.9 (76.8)	29.7 (85.5)	32.1 (89.8)	31.6 (88.9)	28.8 (83.8)	24.3 (75.7)	18.7 (65.7)	15.3 (59.5)	22.9 (73.2)
Mean daily minimum °C (°F)	4.1 (39.4)	4.6 (40.3)	7.3 (45.1)	11.2 (52.2)	14.3 (57.7)	18.2 (64.8)	20.7 (69.3)	21.5 (70.7)	18.1 (64.6)	12.9 (55.2)	8.6 (47.5)	5.0 (41.0)	12.2 (54.0)
Average precipitation mm (inches)	81.3 (3.20)	68.6 (2.70)	73.7 (2.90)	66.0 (2.60)	38.5 (1.52)	9.3 (0.37)	2.8 (0.11)	6.4 (0.25)	35.7 (1.41)	93.8 (3.69)	111.5 (4.39)	99.1 (3.90)	686.7 (27.04)
Mean monthly sunshine hours	165.9	179.5	213.1	230.1	278.5	325.8	367.6	343.2	280.9	225.6	161.3	154.9	2,926.4
Source: Weatherbase

== Demographics ==
Historical population
Year	Pop.	±%
1871	407	—
1881	509	+25.1%
1901	916	+80.0%
1911	990	+8.1%
1921	1,227	+23.9%
1931	1,812	+47.7%
1936	19,654	+984.7%
1951	35,187	+79.0%
1961	49,331	+40.2%
1971	78,210	+58.5%
1981	93,738	+19.9%
1991	106,203	+13.3%
2001	107,898	+1.6%
2011	117,892	+9.3%
2021	127,861	+8.5%
Source: ISTAT

As of 2026, the population is 127,450, of which 49.2% are males, and 50.8% are females. Minors make up 14.8% of the population, and seniors make up 23.4%.

=== Immigration ===
As of 2025, immigrants make up 11.5% of the population. The 5 largest foreign countries of birth are Romania, India, Ukraine, Bangladesh, and Tunisia.

== Frazioni ==
The frazioni of Latina are: Latina Lido, Latina Scalo, Borgo Bainsizza, Borgo Carso, Borgo Faiti, Borgo Grappa, Borgo Isonzo, Borgo Montello, Borgo Piave, Borgo Podgora, Borgo Sabotino, Borgo Santa Maria, Borgo San Michele, Chiesuola, and Tor Tre Ponti.

== Economy ==
The city has some pharmaceutical, chemical industry and a strong service sector. Latina is also an important centre for agriculture (vegetables, flowers, sugar, fruit, cheese and derivates).

The former Latina nuclear power plant has been shut down and is currently undergoing decommissioning.

== Transport ==
There is no airport in the city. The nearest airport is Rome Fiumicino Airport, located 77 km (48 mi) north west of Latina.

== In popular culture ==
The Italian film My Brother Is an Only Child is set in Latina.

The Amazon Prime Video original series Prisma follows the coming-of-age of a group of teenagers from Latina.

== Notable people ==
- Manuela Arcuri, actress
- Calcutta, stage name of Edoardo d'Erme, musician and composer
- Fabrizio del Monte, racing driver
- Tiziano Ferro, pop singer
- Antonio Pennacchi, writer
- Mattia Perin, football goalkeeper
- Karin Proia, actress
- Ilaria Spada, actress
- Elena Santarelli, actress, model and television presenter

== International relations ==
=== Twin towns – sister cities ===
Latina is twinned with:

- Palos de la Frontera, Huelva, Andalusia, Spain
- Farroupilha, Rio Grande do Sul, Brazil
- Birkenhead, Wirral, Merseyside, England

== Gallery ==
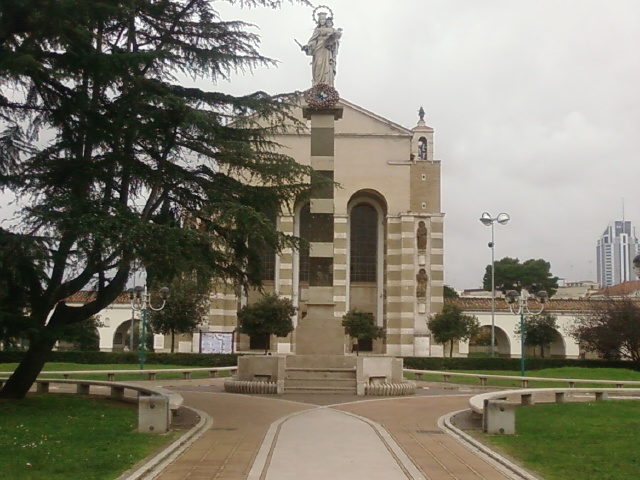
St. Mark's Cathedral

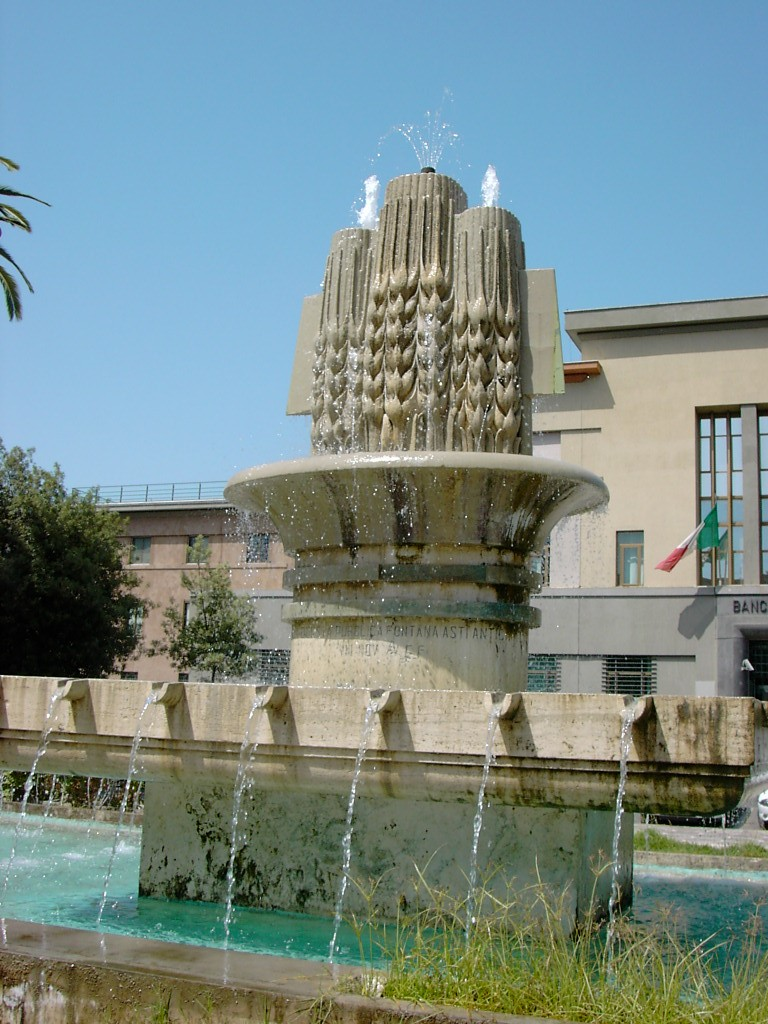
The fountain in Piazza Libertà

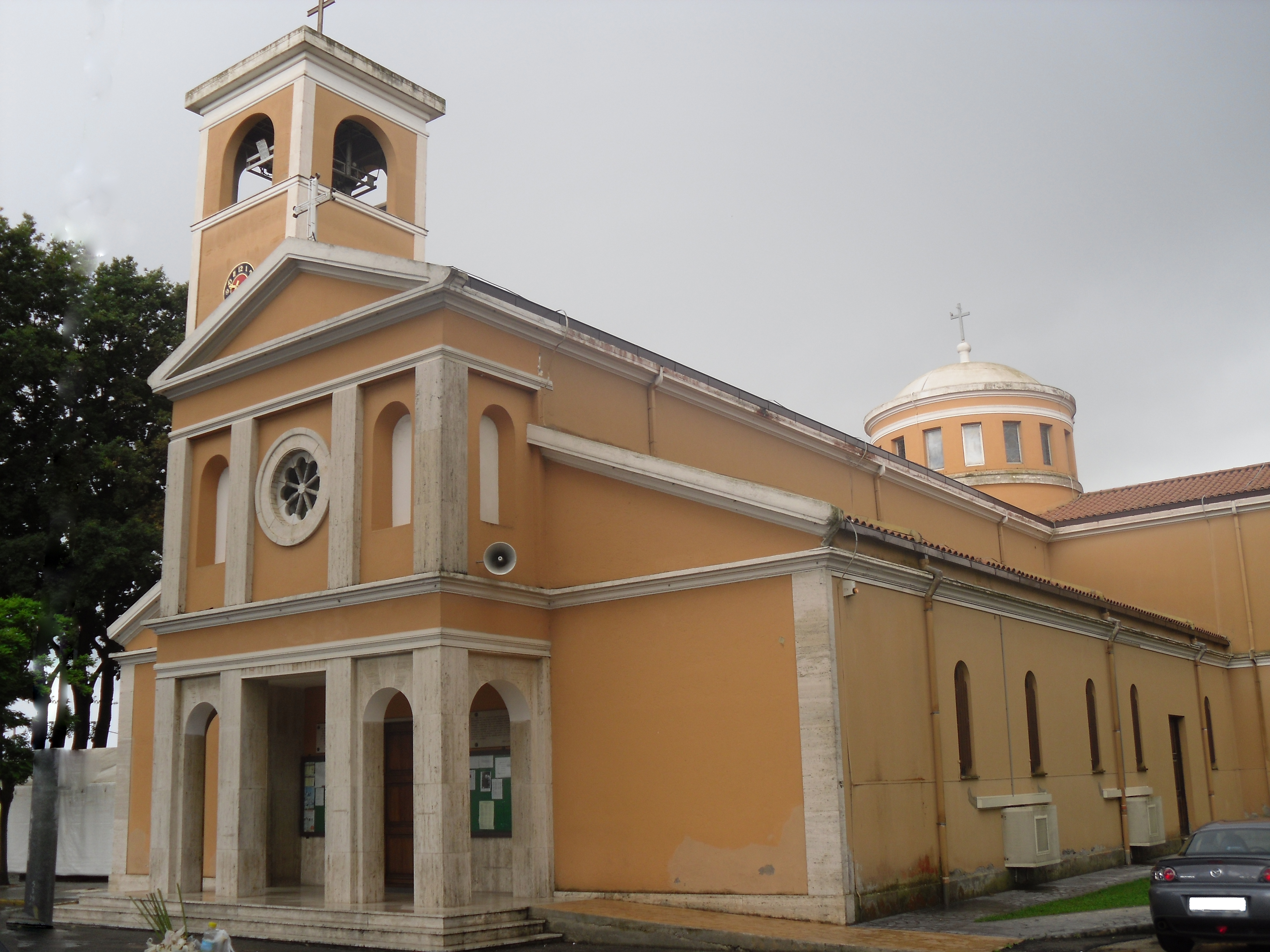
The church of Borgo Sabotino

Torre Pontina, the tallest building in the city and the 11th tallest in Italy

== See also ==
- Latina railway station
- Latina Calcio 1932 – a football club
