= Allison Wright =

English archer (born 1965)

- Wright in 2017

Personal information
- Born: 11 December 1965 Prudhoe, England
- Died: 10 February 2024

Sport
- Country: United Kingdom
- Sport: Archery
- Event: Barebow Traditional bow American Flatbow
- Club: Prudhoe Pathfinders Archery Club - England national team
Medal record
Women's Archery
Representing United Kingdom
Great Britain National Championships NFAS
Gold medal – first place	American Flatbow 2021	individual
- Updated on 04 February 2026

Allison Wright (née Kelly; 11 December 1965 – 10 February 2024) was a British archer who competed in Field and 3D Archery. She held National Field Archery Society (NFAS) titles in the American Flatbow (AFB) and Barebow categories.

== Career ==
At the 2019 World Archery 3D Championships in Lac La Biche, Canada, Wright represented Great Britain and finished 10th in the Women's Instinctive Bow category.

== Personal life ==
Wright was diagnosed with mesothelioma in 2020. She continued to compete while undergoing treatment and won the National Field Archery Society (NFAS) National Championship in 2021.

She died on 10 February 2024, aged 58.
