= 3D archery =

Competitive archery under field hunting conditions

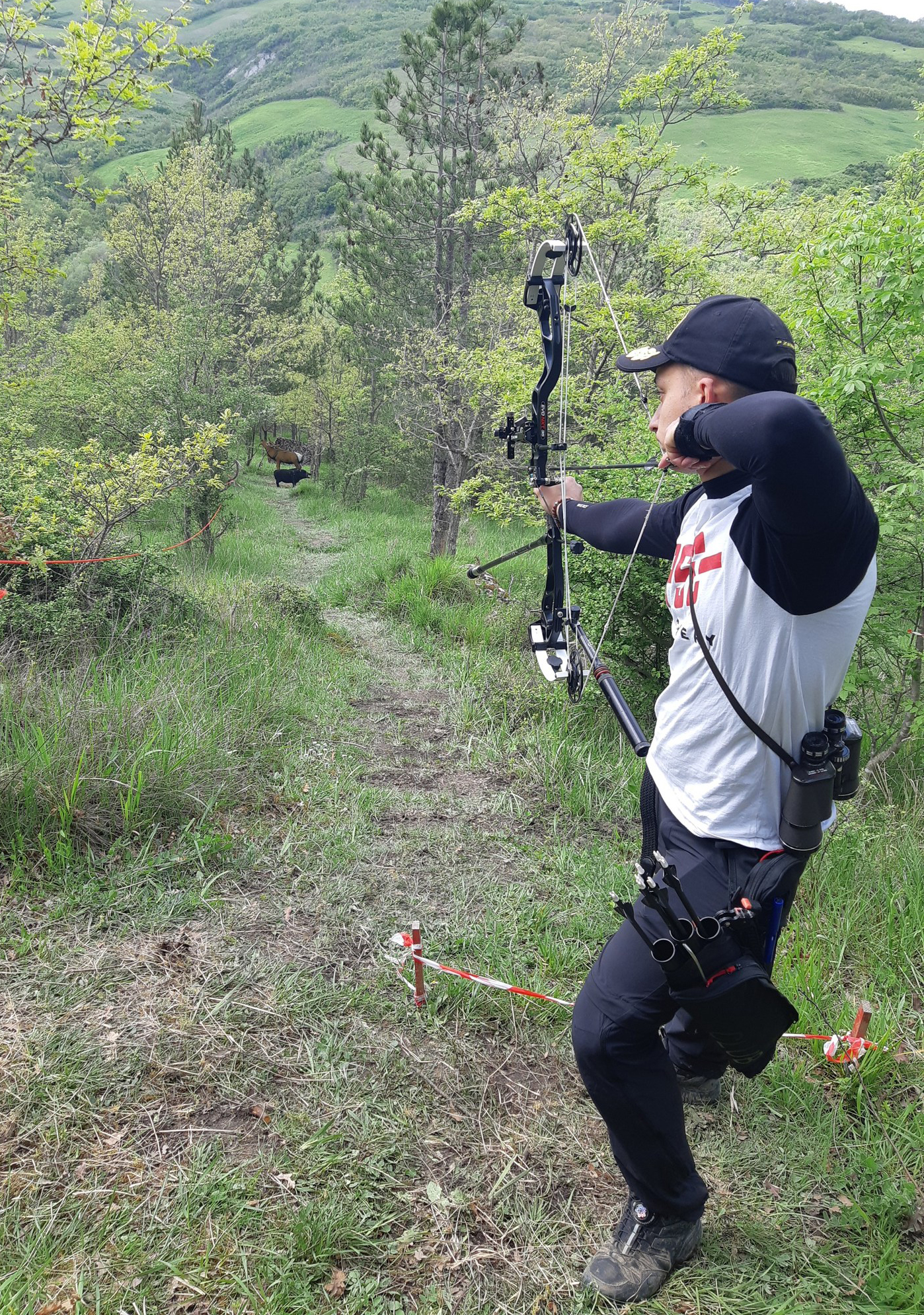
- Compound bow archer on 3D course shooting black rubber boar in Italy in 2025
- Highest governing body: WA, IFAA
- First developed: prehistory

Characteristics
- Contact: No
- Mixed-sex: Yes
- Type: Target sport
- Equipment: Bows, arrows, targets

Presence
- Country or region: Worldwide
- Olympic: No

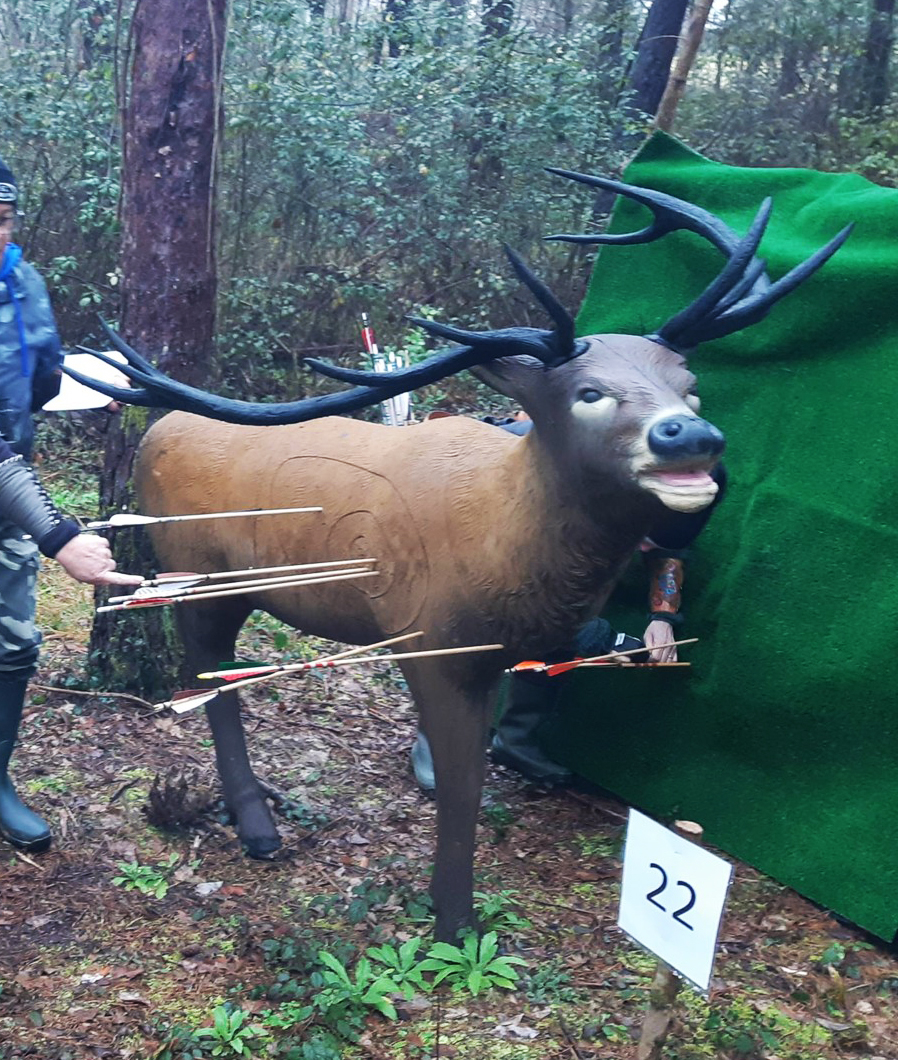
Rubber deer hit by arrows in the vital areas clearly recognizable by the circles.

3D archery is a competitive archery discipline using three-dimensional, foam-rubber animal silhouettes as targets. In common with the related sport of field archery, 3D archery takes place on outdoor trails, and typically in wooded and rugged terrain, where terrain, weather, and lighting conditions pose additional challenges for archers. 3D archery is part of modern competitive archery.

Major international 3D archery events are conducted under the rules of the World Archery Federation (WA), or the International Field Archery Association (IFAA). Other events can be under the rules of national organisations such as the UK National Field Archery Society (NFAS) and Archery GB (AGB) in the UK, or the US National Field Archery Association (NFAA) and Archery Shooters Association (ASA) in the US. Unlike other archery disciplines, 3D archery is a dynamic sport requiring a level of physical ability to move through the woods along the designated paths where the shooting ranges are located.

The paths, like the shooting ranges, can be flat, uphill, or downhill, and the distances between the shooting range and the targets are unknown. The pinnacle of this discipline worldwide occurs during the World Archery 3D Championships. The first edition took place in 2003, and the 2024 edition in Mokrice Castle, Slovenia had more than 305 archers from 31 nations who participated in six days of competition.

== Divisions ==
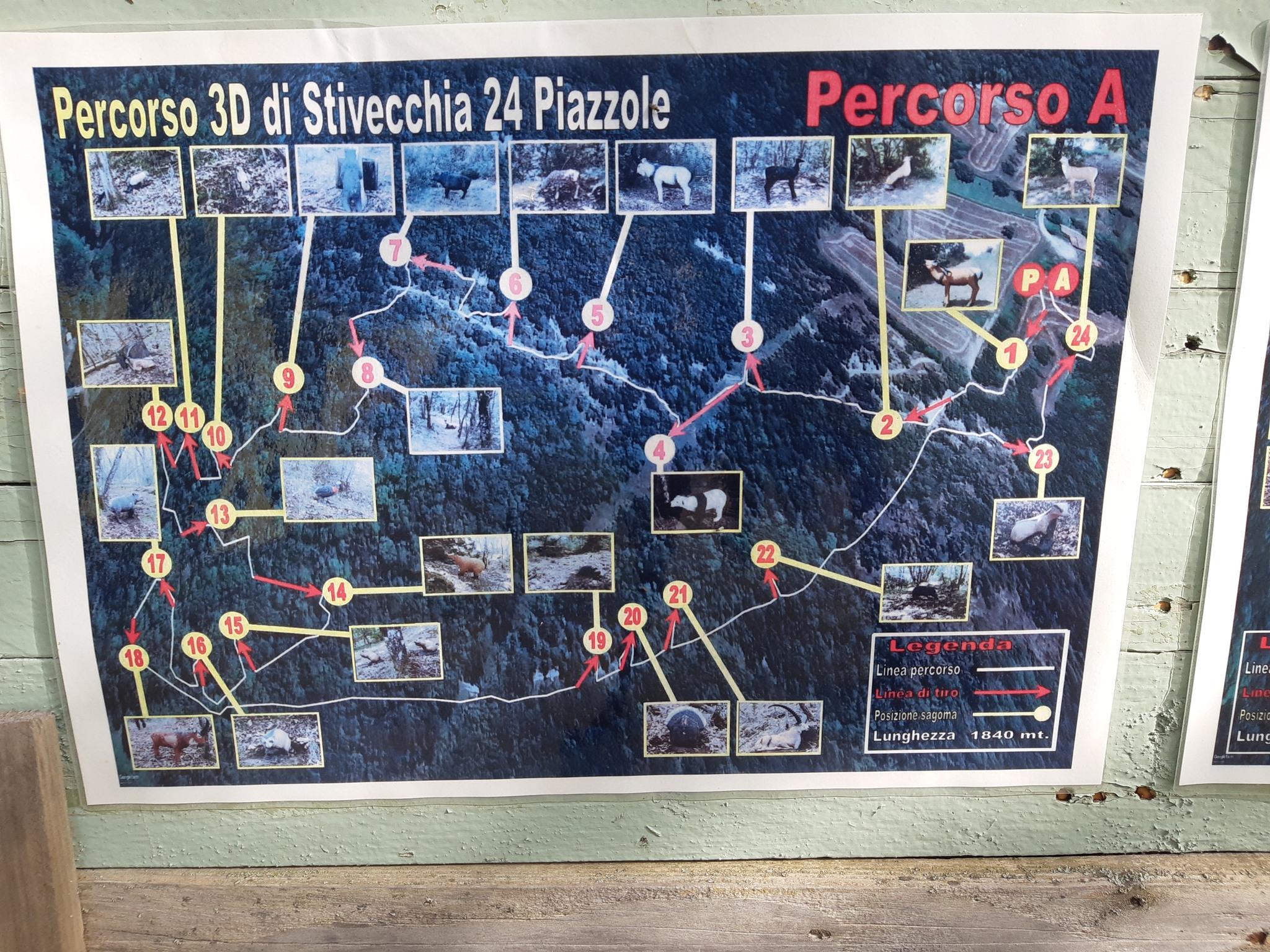
3D training course, 1840m long with 24 tees in Stia, Tuscany, convertible into a WA competition course with the appropriate templates

In World Archery Federation competition regulations, there are four divisions authorized for 3D shooting:

- Traditional bow
- Longbow
- Barebow
- Compound bow

In the Traditional Bow and Longbow Divisions, the string may be held in the "Mediterranean" style with the index finger above the arrow and two fingers below, or with three fingers below, but this must be declared and maintained throughout the competition. In addition to instinctive shooting, aiming techniques (false aim or other systems) may be used, but mechanical aiming devices such as sights or markings are not permitted, although they are permitted, under certain conditions, in the Compound Bow and Barebow Divisions. For all four bow divisions, the maximum diameter of the arrow shaft must not exceed 9.3 mm, and the arrow point must have a maximum diameter of 9.4 mm. All arrows of each athlete must be marked on the shaft with their name or initials and must be identical in type and color. The use of any electrical or electronic devices attached to the athletes' equipment is prohibited.

=== Longbow ===
The longbow must have the typical D-shape (or American flatbow) and, once cocked, the string may only touch the two end slots. Take-down models are permitted, but the structure must comply with the minimum length of 150 cm. The bow window must be free of any markings, laminations, or protrusions that could facilitate subconscious or conscious aiming.

The use of silencers on the string is permitted, but only if positioned at least 30 cm from the nocking point so as not to interfere with the athlete's field of vision. Stabilizers, external weights, or attached vibration dampeners are prohibited; only weights inside the riser are permitted, provided they are inserted during manufacturing and made completely invisible and integrated into the wood or laminate. The bow rest may be protected by thin materials (maximum 3 mm thick) and must not have vertical protrusions greater than 1 cm beyond the resting arrow.

Only wooden arrows with natural feather fletching and a nock attached or directly from the shaft are permitted. String walking and face walking are prohibited: the archer must maintain a fixed anchor point on the face.

Regarding protective and assistive devices, the athlete may use gloves, pads, or thimbles, but without any rigid anchoring plate to help stabilize the position of the hand on the face. Accessories such as arm guards, chest guards, slings, and quivers (back, side, or floor-mounted, but never attached to the bow) are permitted, as well as binoculars for checking shots, provided they do not have graduated scales.

=== Traditional bow ===
A traditional bow can be either monolithic or take-down (disassembled). The riser must be made of wood or laminate and may house internal technological components such as metal bushings for attaching the limbs, which can be adjusted to vary draw weight and tiller. Any weights must be inserted during manufacturing and be invisible, while the bow window must not have any marks or defects that could serve as a reference for aiming.

The arrow rest cannot be adjustable. Simple self-adhesive plastic rests, feather supports, or shooting directly at the arrow window (which may be protected by thin materials no thicker than 3 mm) are permitted. The string may be fitted with silencers (at least 30 cm from the nocking point), but the use of any lip or nosepiece is prohibited, and the central protective wrap must disappear from the archer's field of vision once full draw is reached, to prevent it from becoming a rudimentary sight.

Face walking (changing the anchor point on the face) is permitted, but string walking (moving the fingers on the string) is prohibited. The archer must keep his fingers in contact with the nock (maximum 2 mm distance) and may not use tabs with markings, graduated stitching, or anchor plates. This requires shooting based on sensitivity and muscle memory rather than precise ballistic calculations.

Arrows may be made of any material (wood, carbon, or aluminum), and illuminated nocks are prohibited. Permitted accessories include binoculars (without scales), unmarked corrective glasses, slings, and protective gear such as armguards and chest guards. Quivers may be of any type but may not be attached to the bow.

=== Barebow ===
The barebow regulations outline an instrument that, while technologically advanced in terms of materials, must be free of any artificial aids for aiming and stabilization. The bow must not use through-holes, and, complete with accessories but without the string, it must be able to pass through a 12.2 cm diameter hole. This structural limitation precludes the use of protruding stabilizers, allowing only the installation of weights and vibration dampeners directly on the riser, preferably at the bottom, to balance the instrument without turning it into a complex aiming or stabilization system.

String and draw management are what clearly separates barebow from other divisions. The string must be free of sight holes, lip or nose marks, and any markings that could serve as sights. However, the rules explicitly allow face-walking and string-walking techniques, i.e., the ability to vary the anchor point on the face or the position of the hand on the string to adjust the trajectory of the shot. To support these techniques, the finger guard (tab) may feature stitching or uniform markings, helping the archer count the millimeters of movement on the string, but may not include additional reminders or mechanical release devices.

The bow window area must be free of any markings, laminations, or defects that could aid the athlete in aiming at the target. Technical accessories such as the arrow rest and the shock absorber button must also retain the manufacturer's original color to prevent them from becoming visual cues. The use of draw length indicators (clickers) and illuminated nocks is also prohibited.

Archers may use binoculars or telescopes to determine the impact of arrows, but they must not have graduated scales or markings for distance assessment. Ergonomic accessories such as arm guards, chest guards, dragons, and small shoe covers are permitted, as well as corrective glasses that do not have micro-perforated lenses. Covering the non-dominant eye with a patch or blackout film is also permitted, allowing the athlete to focus exclusively on the natural line of sight.

=== Compound ===
The compound bow can use mechanical pulley or eccentric systems to assist the draw, with a draw weight limit of 60 pounds. The bow's structure allows for the use of cable separators, guards, and adjustable push-pull stops, provided they do not extend more than 6 cm from the grip recess. The string is highly customizable: it can accommodate stop points such as the "visette," draw loops (D-loops), silencers, and weights, guaranteeing the archer maximum stability and precision throughout the shot cycle.

The sighting system represents the pinnacle of technology in the category, allowing for both horizontal and vertical micrometric adjustments. The use of magnifying lenses, prisms, spirit levels, and fiber optic or chemically luminescent aiming points is permitted. For courses with unknown distances, any modification or marking on the sight that might help the athlete estimate the distance to the target is prohibited. Mechanical release devices (push, twist, or thumb releases) are permitted, ensuring perfectly consistent string release. Luminous nocks are prohibited.

Permitted equipment includes various accessories such as arm guards, chest protectors, slings, quivers, and non-electronic wind indicators. Corrective glasses and small shoe lifts are also permitted, provided they do not have aiming marks or are excessively bulky compared to the sole of the foot.

== 3D race ==
As per the regulations (WA), along a well-trodden and marked course within the woodland vegetation, there are 24 shooting positions with pegs indicating the shooting point at two or four identical targets arranged on a slope at unknown distances. Depending on the number of participants, archers shoot in groups of 3 to 6. Before the competition, they position themselves at the designated shooting position and begin shooting simultaneously at the start signal. Two archers shoot at each shooting position; each archer may shoot two arrows. When using two targets, the competitors on the left will shoot the target on the left and those on the right will shoot the one on the right. When using 4 targets the archer on the left will shoot at target 1 (starting from the left) while the archer on the right will shoot at 3, the next pair will shoot at targets 2 and 4. After completing the qualification round with 48 arrows shot, the top 16 in each division will compete in the elimination rounds, which consist of head-to-head matches on six shooting positions. The next four top archers from each division will advance to the semifinals and finals on a four-target course. In addition to the individual event, there is a team competition (the team is made up of four archers, one representing each division) and a mixed team competition, where a man and a woman from the same division compete.

=== Clothing ===
For these shooting disciplines and for all Classes and Divisions, the uniform may consist of special clothing such as tracksuits, waterproof suits, sweaters, etc., provided they clearly and clearly display the Club's name and/or emblem. Trousers, including denim, may be worn. Boots and walking shoes are permitted, but camouflage clothing is not permitted.

=== Distances ===
Red pegs:

- Compound Bow Men and Women

Maximum distance: 45 meters, minimum distance: 5 meters

Blue pegs:

- Barebow Men and Women
- Longbow Men and Women
- Traditional Bow Men and Women

Maximum distance: 30 meters, minimum distance: 5 meters

=== Animal photographs ===
Approximately 5–10 meters from the shooting peg, a peg will be placed with a photograph of the animal at that peg, including the lines and location of the respective scoring zones.

=== Shooting station ===
In individual competitions, each shooting station must have a peg or marker that allows at least two competitors to shoot two arrows per target, either standing or kneeling. The team will shoot a total of four (4) arrows, one (1) arrow for each team member. In mixed team competitions, archers will shoot two (2) arrows each. Both teams will shoot simultaneously; only one athlete will be allowed at the shooting station at a time.

=== Scores ===
3D target scoring zone.

Each silhouette has three concentric circles corresponding to the animal's vital points, the smallest of which is called "Perfect." Scores vary depending on the point hit: the more accurate the shot, the higher the score.

Body	5 points
Spot	8 points
Super Spot	10 points
Perfect	11 points

An arrow that touches the line dividing two scoring zones or the outer line of the scoring area will be scored as the higher score. An arrow that hits the horns, hooves, or any other non-scoring part of the target, without touching the colored area of the body, that deviates from, or misses the target, will be scored as a miss (M). The points of the two arrows are added together for each target.

=== Awards ===
At the end of the competition we will have the following categories awarded:

Longbow women; Longbow men; Traditional women; Traditional men; Barebow women; Barebow men; Compound women; Compound men; Women's Team; Men's Team; Longbow, Mixed Team; Traditional Bow, Mixed Team; Barebow, Mixed Team; Compound, Mixed Team

== World Archery International Competitions ==
The World Archery 3D Championships are held every two years, in even-numbered years, alternating with the European 3D Championships, which are held in odd-numbered years. The Italian national team has been one of the most medal-winning teams in recent years.
