= Reinhard Leixner =

Austrian archer (born 1978)

Personal information
- Born: 1977 (age 48–49)

Sport
- Country: Austria
- Sport: Archery
- Event: Traditional bow
- Club: TBS Vöcklabruck - Austrian National Team
Medal record
Man's Archery
Representing Austria
- Updated on 15 January 2026

Reinhard Leixner (born 1977) is an Austrian archer.

== Biography ==
Reinhard Leixner is a physiotherapist by profession and began practicing archery in the fall of 2020. He claims that his professional ability to break down and analyze movements, combined with various books and videos, has allowed him to learn and practice archery technique independently. He has been a member of the national team since 2023 and in 2024 he won gold at the World Archery 3D Championships in the mixed team alongside Claudia Weinberger.

== Medal table ==
Traditional bow
World Archery 3D Championships
Edition	Place	Medal	Event
2024	Mokrice (Slovenia)	1st place, gold medalist(s)	Mixed Team
European Archery 3D Championships
Edition	Place	Medal	Event
2025	Divčibare (Slovenia)	2nd place, silver medalist(s)	Mixed Team
