= IFAA =

IFAA may refer to:

- International Field Archery Association
- International Federation of Associations of Anatomists, a professional organization for human anatomists
