= Welsh Field Archery Association =

Governing body of field archery in Wales

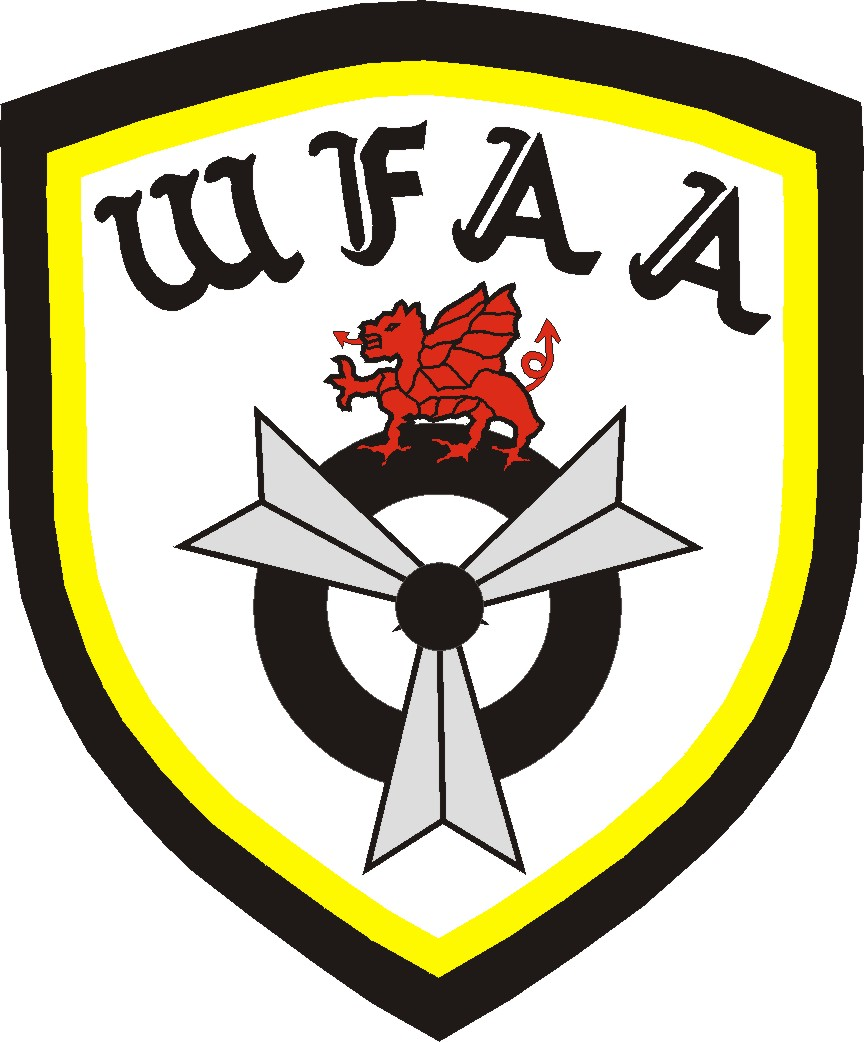
Logo of the WFAA

The Welsh Field Archery Association (WFAA) is Wales's governing body of field archery. It is affiliated with the world governing body, the International Field Archery Association (IFAA), a member of the leading World Sport for all association TAFISA. The WFAA manages all aspects of the sport in Wales, including governance, national teams, and the organisation and administration of national and international tournaments.

== History ==
The WFAA was founded in 1970 (55 years ago) after the British Field Archery Association merged with the English Field Archery Association to form the EFAA. The merger of the BFAA and EFAA was designed to bring the sport under a single governing body, but this did not suit most members. In 1967, the Scottish members broke away and formed the Scottish Field Archery Association. This development precipitated a meeting of the Welsh Company of Archers, which was held at Glyncornel Centre, Rhondda, in December 1969, where it was decided to form the Welsh Field Archery Association (WFAA) as the governing body of the sport of field archery in Wales. This development spelt the birth of today's WFAA and the now well-known format in the UK, where each Home Nation has its own governing body. This format also means that Great Britain is not represented in the IFAA code of field archery at the international level.

== Structure and Management of the WFAA ==
The WFAA is headed by its president, who chairs the WFAA General Committee. This Committee is responsible for running the Association and consists of administrators who manage record keeping, communication, finances, tournament management, coaching activities, and team selection. Each member club has a representative on the General Committee. The Committee also has an IFAA Delegate who represents Wales' interests with the IFAA and who attends the bi-annual IFAA World Council Meeting.

In addition, there are two subcommittees: the Welsh Squad and Team Selection Panel (tasked with team and squad selection) and the Coaching Committee, which is headed by the National Coach (responsible for managing the training and development of coaches).

The day-to-day running of archery activities is managed by the WFAA's network of clubs, which also manages training for archers from beginner level upwards, classification shoots, and regional-level tournaments.

National and international tournaments are usually hosted by member clubs but managed directly by the WFAA General Committee.

== Development of Field Archery in Wales ==
Since 2004, the WFAA has seen a significant increase in development activities in Wales to promote the sport and its profile in the Principality. During this period, the WFAA expanded its network of clubs, promoted membership growth, and grew its network of field archery courses across Wales. In 2009, the WFAA signed up to the newly conceived IFAA International Instructors Program. Subsequently, all coaches and instructors in Wales underwent re-training and re-qualification to the new system. This has resulted in more structured training of archers at all levels in Wales.

2009 also saw the appointment of a new National Coach post. This position was charged not only with developing coaches in Wales but also with developing elite archers. This development saw a re-structuring of the Welsh National Squad program to make it more effective and structured.

== Hosting of Major Tournaments ==
The WFAA holds annual National Championships for field archery, 3D Bowhunting, and Indoor target archery. Archers from Wales also compete in the UK & Ireland Field Archery Championships, which are held annually and consist of archers from Wales, England, Scotland, Northern Ireland, and the Republic of Ireland. The hosting of this tournament rotates around each member nation, and the WFAA hosts once every five years.

The WFAA has hosted the European Field Archery Championships twice in its history. The first was in 1980 when the tournament was held on the Dunraven Estate at Merthyr Mawr, near Bridgend in South Wales. The second time was in 2009 when the tournament was held at Tal y Coed, near Monmouth.

== International Tournament Success ==
The WFAA has enjoyed international tournament success, particularly from the 1980s and 2004 onwards. Wales has had 4 world champions in its history: Fabien Spalvieri (2003), Mathew Symmonds (2008, 2010, 2014), Gary Hart (2013) and Sandra Anderson (2015). There have also been several Welsh archers who have won the European Field Archery Championships, European Bowhunter Championships, and the UK & Ireland Field Archery Championships.
