= NFAA =

NFAA may refer to:

- National Field Archery Association
- National Foundation for Advancement in the Arts
- No Fun at All, a Swedish skate punk rock music band
