= Takedown bow =

Bow assembled out of a riser and two limbs

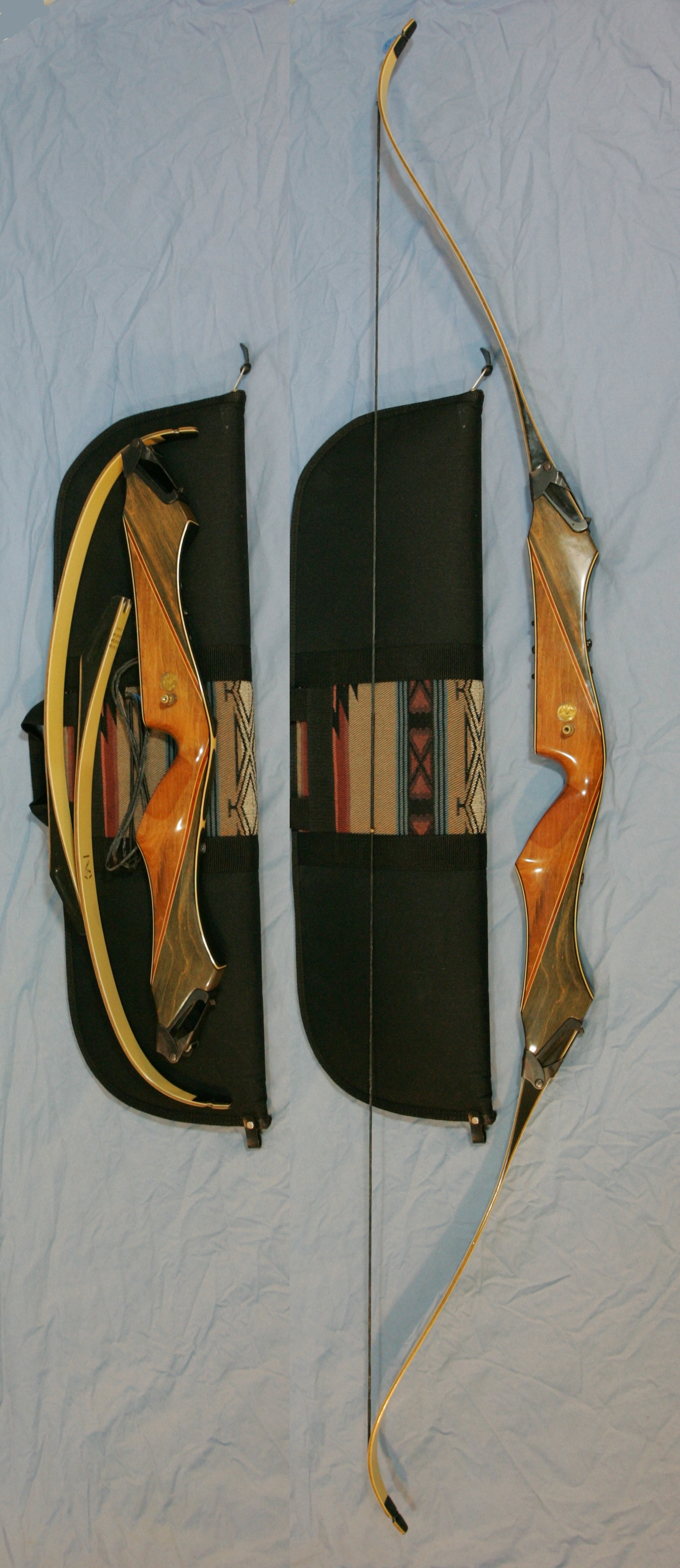
The same takedown bow is shown disassembled on a travel case, and assembled for use.

A takedown bow is a bow assembled out of a riser and two limbs to make a working bow when strung.

The primary advantage of the takedown design is that it can be transported in a much shorter case when disassembled. The secondary advantage is that an archer can change bow configuration by changing limbs.

The riser is the center where the archer holds the bow. The limbs attach to the riser.

The limbs are the parts of a bow that bend when the string is drawn. The string attaches at each end of the limbs and gives propelling force to the arrow.

An archer can update their takedown bow with new limbs to take advantage of advancements in materials or design.

Stronger limbs give a greater draw weight, which will impart more force to the arrow. But stronger limbs require the archer to do more work to pull the string back, and more effort to hold steady while aiming.

Longer or shorter limbs can be used to change the length of the bow for convenience or to match the preference of the archer for smoothness in the draw cycle, and stability.

In the version without balance bars, sights and various accessories, with a wooden or laminated wood riser, the take-down bow is used in the Traditional bow division, while with a riser of other materials (aluminium, carbon, mixed) and a minimum of balance bars it is used in the Barebow division. Complete with stabilizers, balancers, sight and various accessories, it is used in the Recurve bow division.

Almost all bows used for Olympic Archery are takedown recurve bows.
