= Ian Edwards =

Ian Edwards may refer to:

- Ian Edwards (comedian) (born 1972), stand-up comedian
- Ian Edwards (footballer, born 1955), Welsh football player
- Ian Edwards (archer) (born 1974), British archer, artist and sculptor
- Ian Edwards (defendant) in R v Brooks, Coulson and six others
