= Maljen =

Mountain in Serbia

- Location within Serbia

Highest point
- Elevation: 1,104 m (3,622 ft)
- Coordinates: 44°07′09″N 20°01′22″E

Geography
- Location: Western Serbia
- Parent range: Dinaric Alps

Maljen (Serbian: Маљен) (pronounced [mâʎɛn]) is a mountain in western Serbia, to the south of the city of Valjevo. The highest peak is Kraljev Sto, at 1,104 m (3,622 ft) above sea level, followed by Crni Vrh at 1,096 m (3,596 ft). On Maljen is situated resort Divčibare with 3 hotels, 24 holiday camps, two mountain lodges and two ski trails. During summer the slopes of the mountain are covered with flower meadows with white daffodils.

After the successful program of brown bears protection on the Tara mountain, some 100 km (62 mi) to the southwest, by the 2020s bears re-appeared on the Maljen, too.

== Crna Reka Canyon ==
The canyon of the Crna Reka river is located just below the Divčibare resort, to the north. A 12.5 km (7.8 mi) long path into the canyon, which includes hiking, descending or walking through water, was adapted for tourists. It starts at the Ljuti Krš peak, under which the river springs. The sides are very steep, at some sections almost vertical and are carved in the black magmatic rocks. There is a small waterfall at the entrance into the canyon and, though small, the river creates shallows, falls and ponds. The total descent is 500 m (1,600 ft). The canyon, which is some 120 km (75 mi) southwest from Belgrade, is protected by the state as the natural reserve.

== Gallery ==
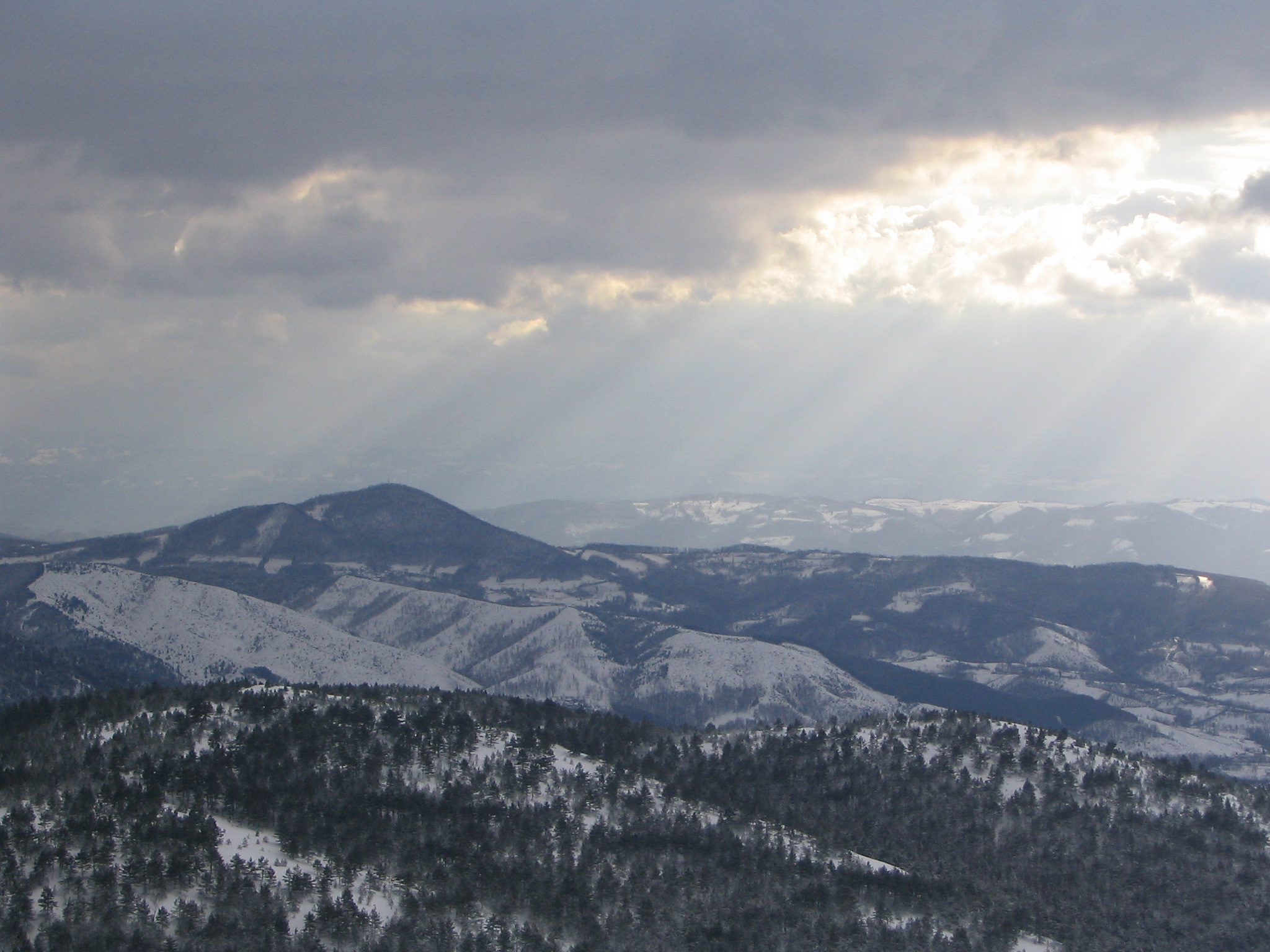

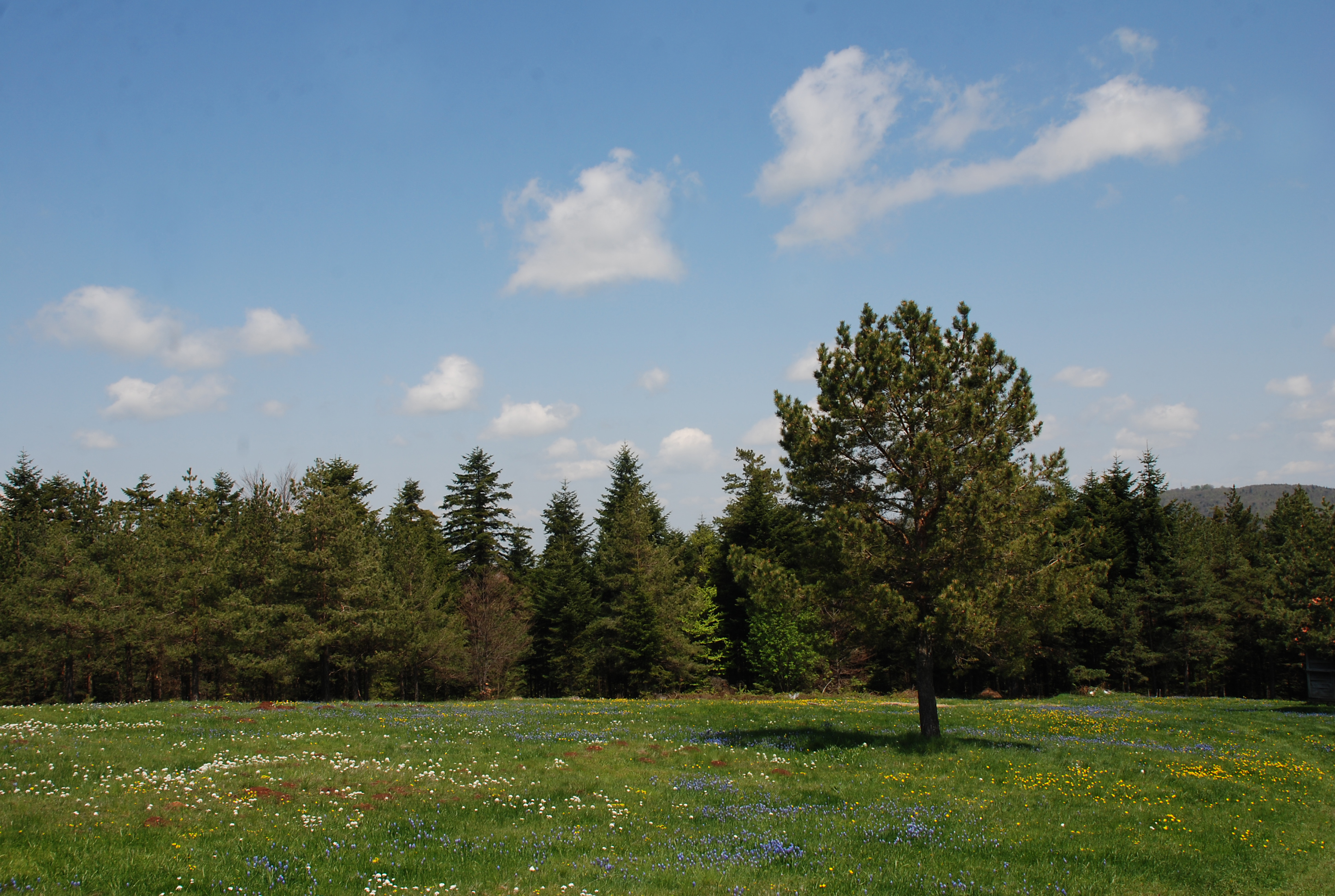

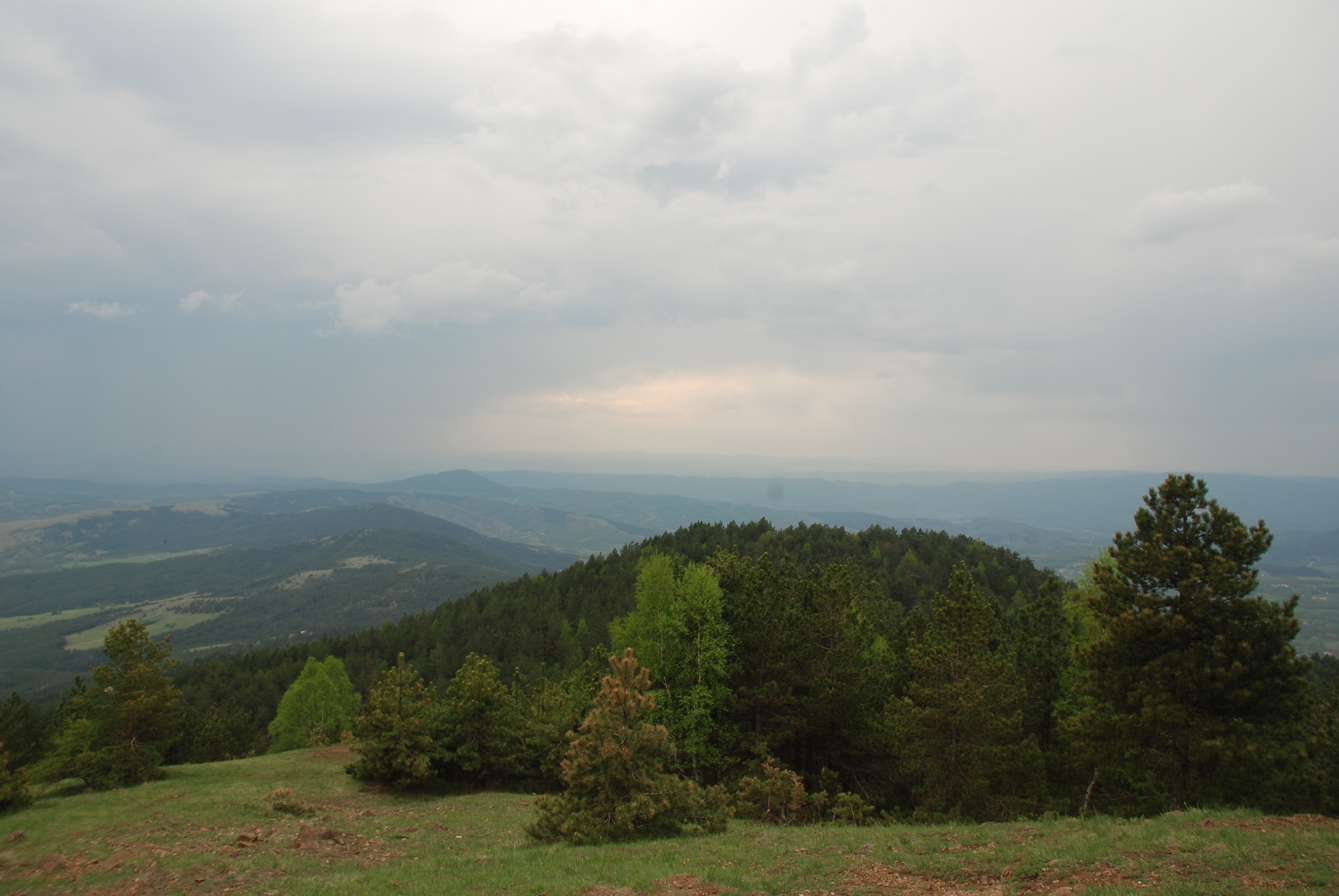
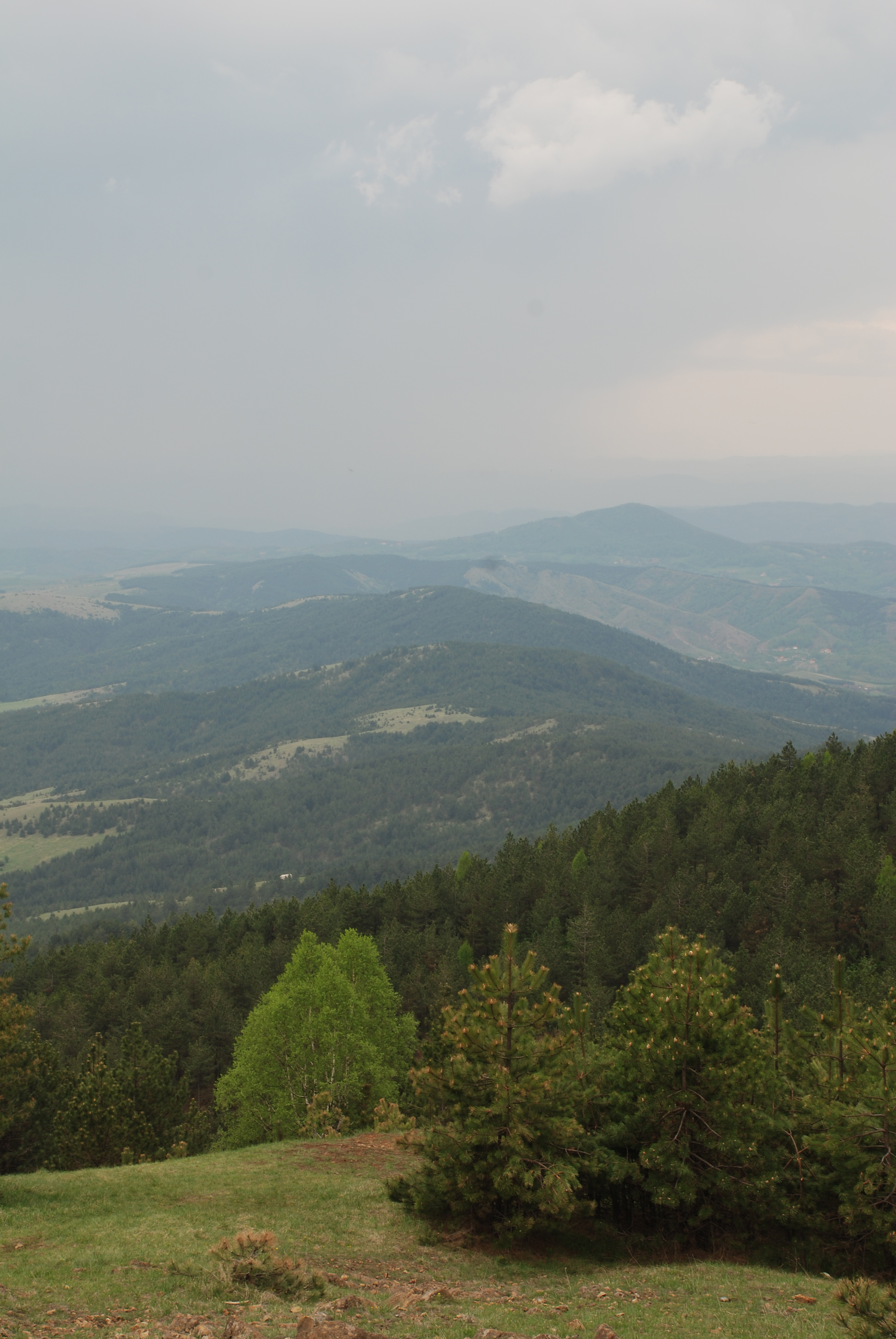

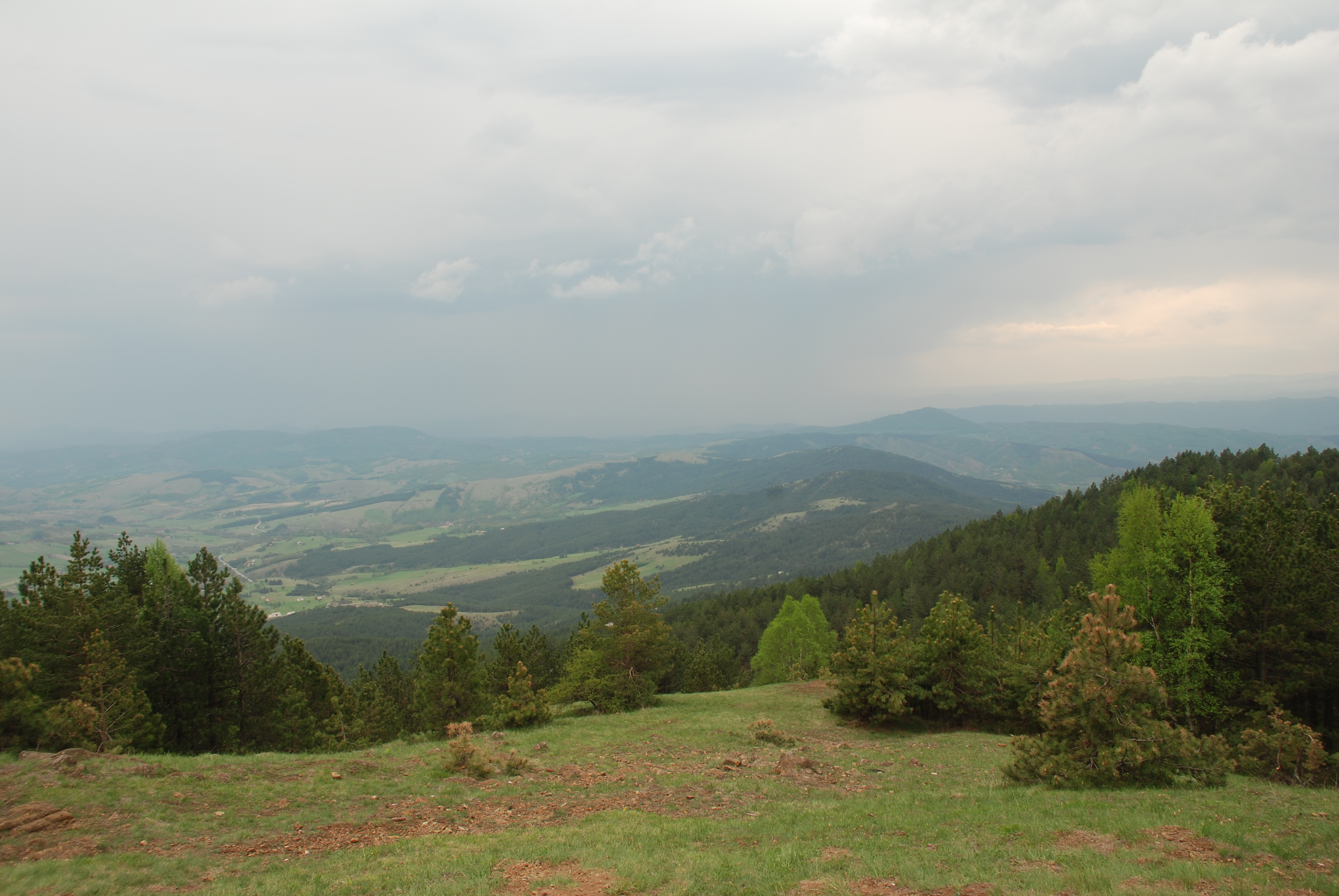

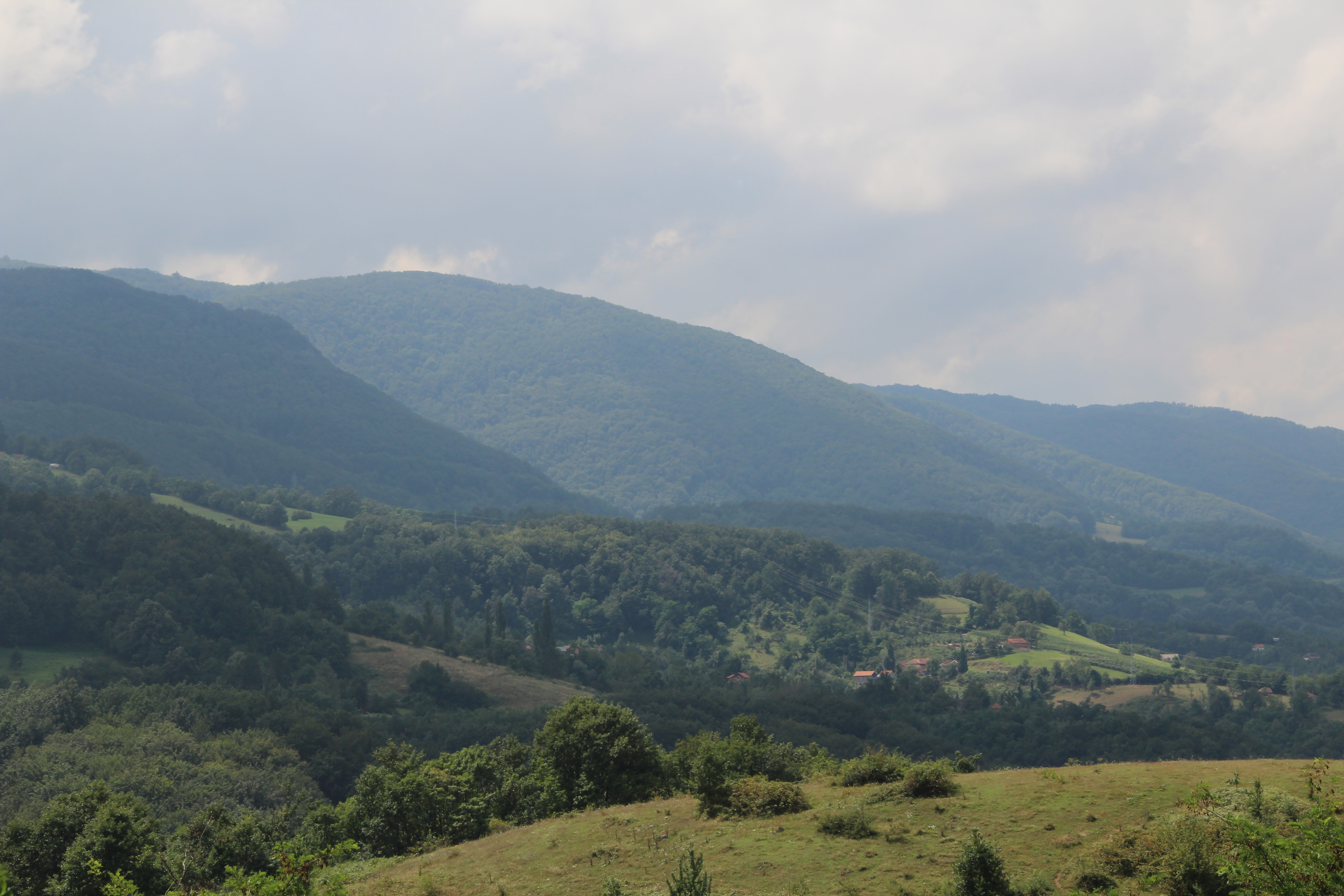
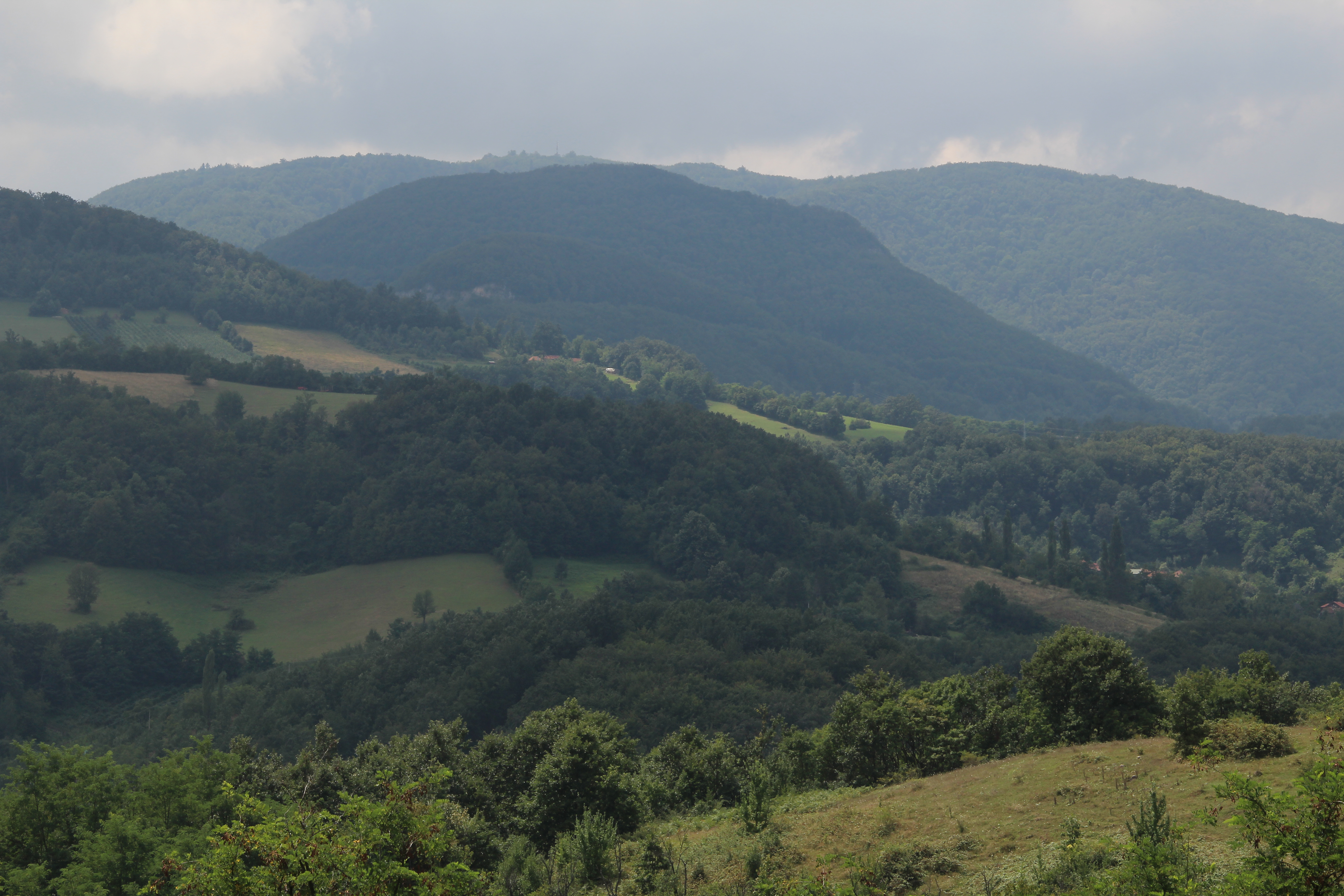

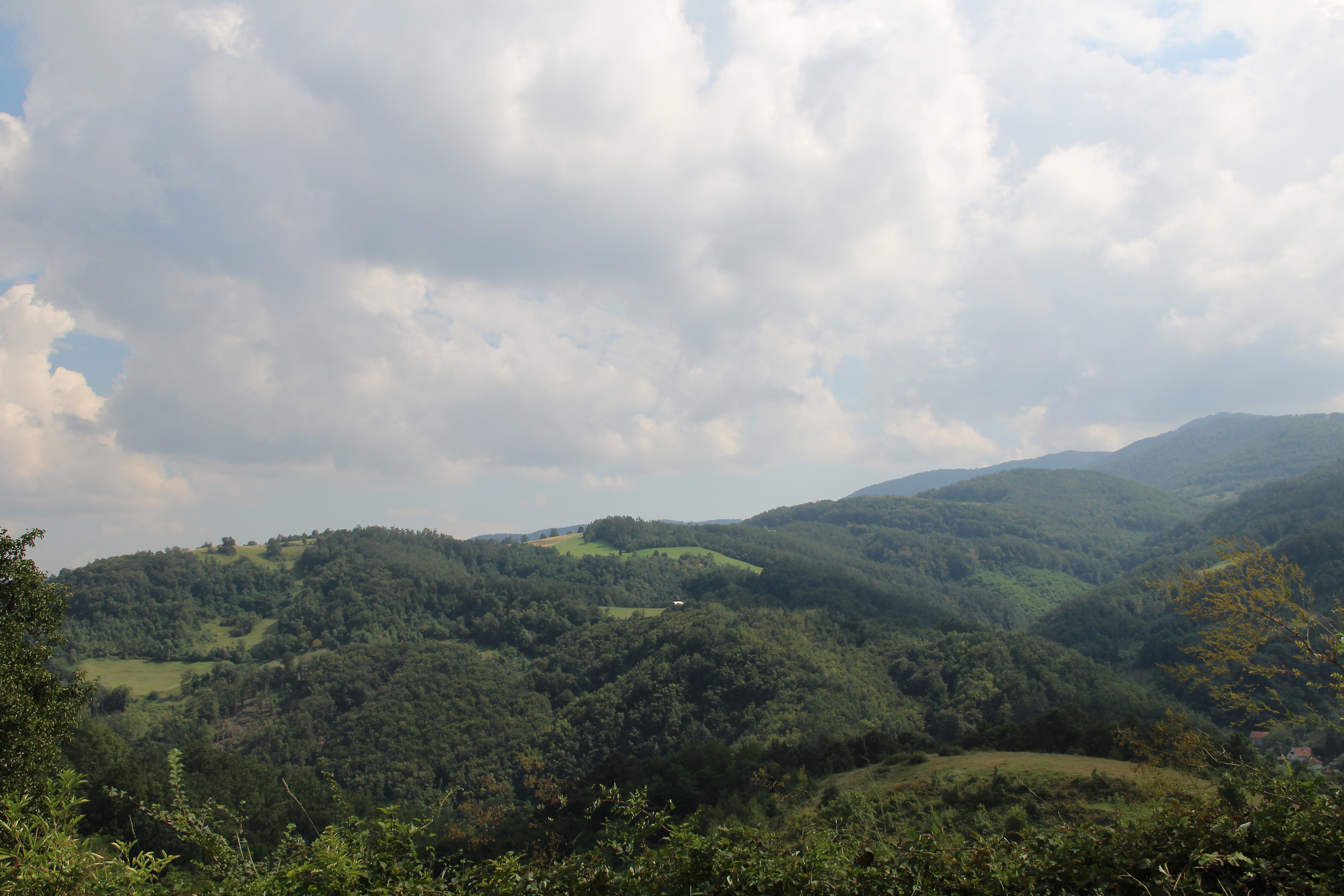

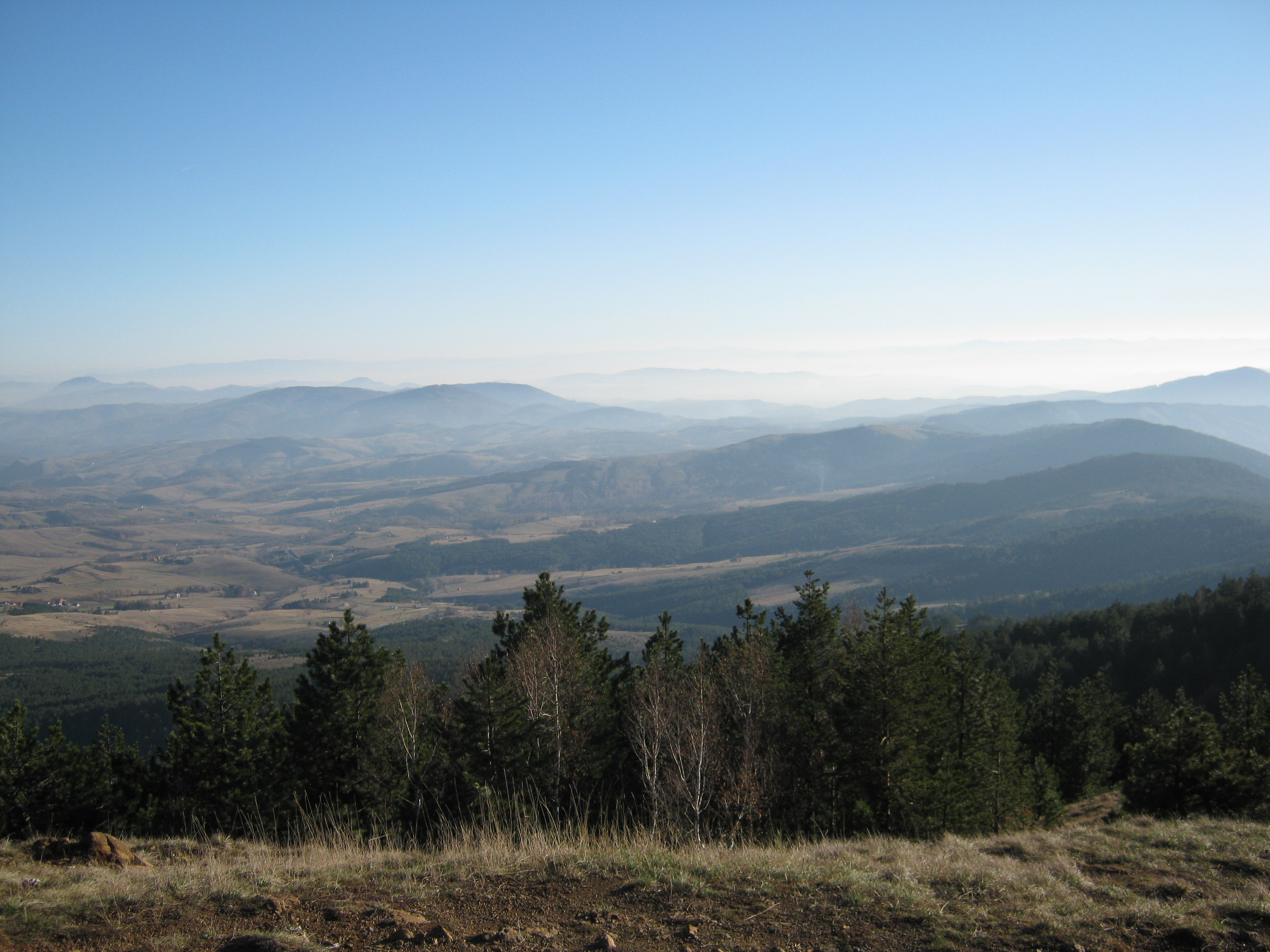

== See also ==
- List of mountains in Serbia

== Sources ==
- 39 Maljen–Suvobor
- Divčibare - pet šafrančića za jod u vazduhu! EkoSfera 2008-07-07
