= Traditional bow =

Competitive archery division

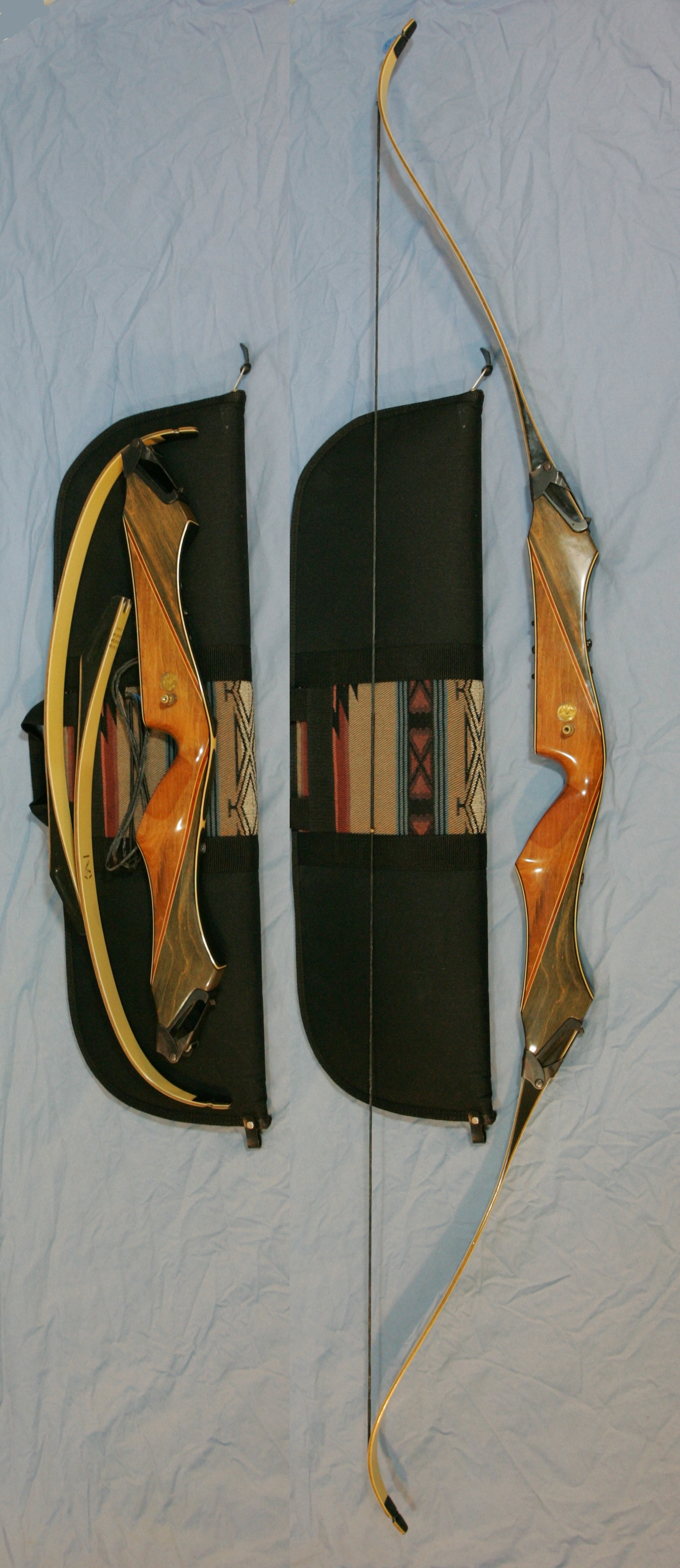
Take-down bow disassembled and assembled, the image allows you to see the two limbs separated from the wooden riser.

The traditional bow is a division that includes some types of bow defined by the international regulation of the World Archery, the world governing body of archery, relating to 3D and sometimes Field archery competitions (they differ mainly in the type of targets: in 3D Archery there are rubber silhouettes depicting animals, in Field Archery there are plates with concentric circles).

== Description ==
This division (category) replaces the previous one called instinctive bow, where the riser (the central part) could be made of various materials, even non-wood (carbon, aluminum, mixed). With the new one, the riser must be made of laminate or a single piece of wood, while the bow can be monolithic (all one piece) or take-down (with limbs that can be detached from the riser; these can be made of various materials, even non-wood). The category's name change is the final step in a process that began in 2012, with some specifications on the riser requiring the use of wood or laminated wood, as the increasingly varied construction techniques were beginning to make the judges' job difficult. The change ended on September 1, 2022, with the entry into force of the current regulation. The change in category designation from "instinctive" to "traditional" bow therefore primarily responds to the need to clearly distinguish equipment based on historical materials and shapes (wood, no rest) from modern bows (recurve bow, compound bow, barebow), focusing more on bow technology than on the individual archer's shooting technique. Indeed, the technique remains unchanged: the archer cannot use reference points on the bow for aiming, and the arrow rest must be free of devices such as clickers or Berger buttons. String walking, which is permitted in barebow archery, is prohibited, while sights and balances are permitted in compound and recurve archery.

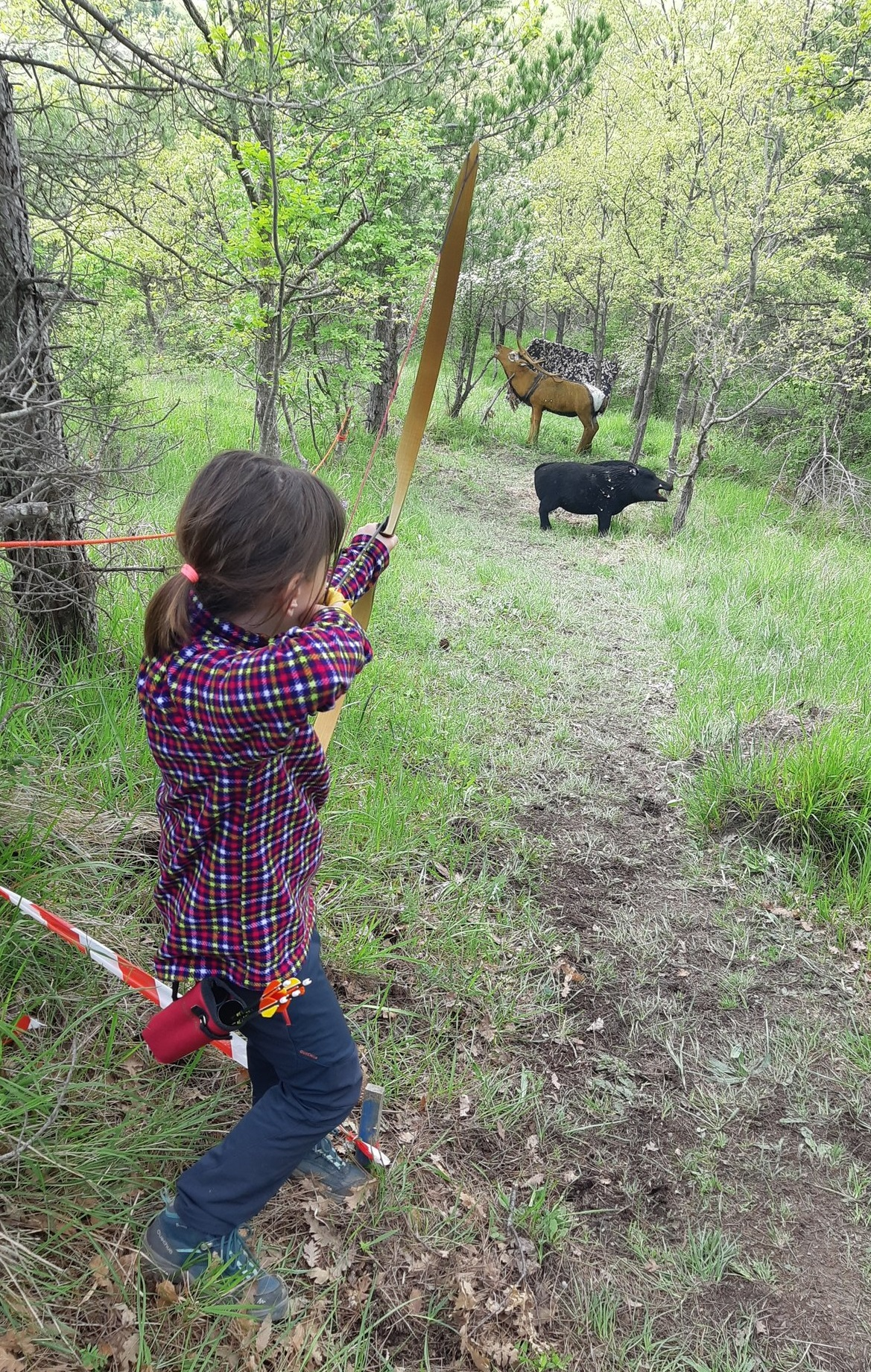
Young female archer with a monolithic bow on a 3D course in the woods, with the hard rubber silhouettes of a wild boar and a deer in the background

The category closest to the traditional one is the Longbow, in which the bow is still unattached but is longer, the limbs are straight, and the arrows are made entirely of wood. They also share the ability to use instinctive shooting, the oldest method of archery that doesn't rely on sights or collimation between the target and the bow, but instead uses the brain's ability to calculate trajectory by focusing solely on the target. Since more and more archers are using methods similar to instinctive shooting but different from them, which betray its "philosophy," the name change has resolved the issue.

== Technical specifications ==
=== Bow and riser ===
The bow can be monolithic (one piece) or disassembled (take-down), consisting of a grip, a central section (riser), and two flexible half-bows (limbs), each ending in a tip with a notch for holding the string. The riser (central section) must be made of wood or laminated wood. Factory-made metal accessories are permitted inside it, only for attaching the limbs or bushings for stabilizers. Any weights must be inserted by the manufacturer and be completely invisible (covered by the wood). The arrow rest must be simple and non-adjustable; a plastic clip rest, a feather rest, or a mat of any material applied directly to the bow window may be used, provided it is no higher than 3 mm. The limbs may be adjustable to adjust the tiller and vary the draw weight of the bow.

=== String ===
The bowstring can be of any material and color. Silencers are permitted (at least 30 cm from the nocking point), but kissers and peep-sights are prohibited.

=== Arrows ===
Any type of arrow (carbon, aluminum, or wood) may be used, but they must all be identical in type, fletching color, and nocks. The maximum shaft diameter is 9.3 mm, and each arrow must bear the athlete's name or initials.

=== Appearance and protections ===
It is absolutely forbidden to have sights, marks, defects, or laminations in the area of the window that could aid aiming. String walking (moving your fingers on the string) is prohibited, while face walking (changing the point of contact on the face) is permitted. You may shoot with your fingers separated or with "three fingers under" the nock (maximum 3 mm distance from it). Gloves, tabs, or thimbles are permitted, provided they are not attached to attachment devices or anchor plates, armguards, chest guards, slings, limb dampeners, and belt, ground, or back quivers. Quivers may not be attached to the bow.
