= National Field Archery Association =

American archery organization

The National Field Archery Association is a field archery organization in the United States. Founded in 1939, it is a non-profit organization. It consists of 49 chartered state organizations and nearly 1,000 affiliated clubs. It is also a member of the International Field Archery Association and an allied organization of USA Archery. Members receive its quarterly magazine, Archery.

The NFAA supports a variety of archery styles: Barebow, Freestyle, Freestyle Limited, Freestyle Bowhunter, Traditional, Freestyle Limited Recurve and Crossbow.

In conjunction with the Easton Development Foundation (ESDF), the NFAA awards scholarships to student archers participating in competitive archery programs. Grants are also available to Olympic, PanAmerica and World Team members, who have graduated from college.

In 2007 the NFAA, the Easton Sports Development Foundation and the City of Yankton teamed to create a Regional Archery Center of Excellence in Yankton, South Dakota. In 2011 they expanded and the NFAA Easton Yankton Archery Center now provides three outdoor field ranges, a 3D range, two FITA ranges, a 90m indoor range, classroom and fitness areas, an art studio and the NFAA Foundation Archery Museum.

There are state chapters within the NFAA that hold state level tournaments, such as the Ohio Archers Association (OAA).
