= National Field Archery Society =

British archery organisation

The National Field Archery Society (NFAS) is a British organisation that exists to foster and promote field archery as a sport.

Information in this article is taken from items in newsletters of the NFAS.

== History ==
Field archery was introduced to the United Kingdom by US armed forces personnel stationed in the UK during World War II and the subsequent Cold War period.

Archers wanting to practice field archery formed clubs such as the Severn Valley Field Archers and the Dunkery Field Bowmen.

In 1959 the British Field Archery Association (BFAA) was formed at Dunster in Somerset. The association held annual championships, and defined various rounds shot at unmarked distances in woodland. The BFAA did not require clear lanes between the shooting position and the target - the preference was for the course to be as natural as possible.

In 1970 the BFAA merged with the more recently formed English Field Archery Association (EFAA). The EFAA drew its membership largely from areas around US military bases in the UK, and followed the US practice of shooting at marked distances through cleared lanes.

The merged organisation followed the EFAA's preferences for marked distances and cleared lanes.

Many archers who had been members of the BFAA were dissatisfied with the changes to the character of field archery. In 1972 a group of archers drafted a constitution and a set of rules that enshrined their preferred style of shooting unmarked distances in natural conditions. This led to the formation of the National Field Archery Society, whose first Annual General Meeting took place on 10 March 1973 at Clayton Community Centre, Norwood Lane, Clayton, Newcastle, Staffordshire.

== Current status ==
The NFAS has grown to become the largest field archery organisation in the UK. The NFAS is not affiliated to any international organisation.

The NFAS recognises 12 styles of bow:

- American Flatbow (AFB)
- Barebow (BB)
- Bowhunter (BH)
- Compound Limited (CL)
- Crossbow (XB)
- Freestyle (FS)
- Hunting Tackle (HT)
- Longbow (LB)
- Primitive (PV)
- Traditional Bowhunter (TB)
- Thumb Draw (TD)
- Unlimited (UL)

The general rules are determined by a committee and ratified or rejected by the membership. Specific rules applying to each bow style are determined by votes cast only by archers who shoot that bow style.

Rounds are shot at unmarked distances, predominantly using 2D and 3D animal targets.

Two championship events are held every year:

- 3D Championships - Bank Holiday weekend, end of May
- National Championships - 3rd weekend in September
