= Field archery =

Competitive archery under field hunting conditions

- Field Archery, 2014
- Highest governing body: WA, IFAA
- First developed: prehistory

Characteristics
- Contact: No
- Mixed-sex: No
- Type: Target sport
- Equipment: Bows, arrows, targets

Presence
- Country or region: Worldwide
- Olympic: No
- World Games: 1985–2017

Field archery is any archery discipline that involves shooting at outdoor targets of varying and often unmarked distance, typically in woodland and rough terrain.

Being a traditional field sport as well as a widely recognized competitive sport in its own right, field archery can be used to improve the techniques and fitness required for bowhunting in a realistic wilderness setting. Archers sometimes refer to the additional skills required to deal with challenging terrain, lighting and weather conditions as "fieldcraft".

Field archery events are usually conducted according to the rules of either the International Field Archery Association (IFAA) or the World Archery Federation (WA). Others may be held under the rules of national organisations such as the UK National Field Archery Society (NFAS) and the US National Field Archery Association (NFAA) and Archery Shooters Association (ASA).

== IFAA/NFAA ==
International Field Archery Association (IFAA) and US National Field Archery Association (NFAA) competitions include three rounds: field, hunter, and animal. A round consists of 28 targets in two units of 14.

Field rounds are at 'even' distances up to 80 yards (75 m) (although some of the shortest are measured in feet), using targets with a black inner ring, two white middle rings and two black outer rings. Four face sizes are used for the various distances. A score of five points is awarded for shots which hit the centre spot, four for the white inner ring, and three for the outer black ring.

Hunter rounds use 'uneven' distances up to 70 yards (65 m). Scoring is similar to a field round, the target has an all-black face with a white bullseye. Child and youth positions for these two rounds are closer, no more than 30 and 50 yards (25 and 45 m), respectively.

Animal rounds use life-size 2D animal targets with 'uneven' distances reminiscent of the hunter round. The rules and scoring are also significantly different. The archer begins at the first station of the target and shoots his first arrow. If it hits, he does not have to shoot again. If it misses, he advances to station two and shoots a second arrow, then to station three for a third if needed. Scoring areas are vital (20, 16, or 12) and nonvital (18, 14, or 10) with points awarded depending on which arrow scored first. Again, children and youth shoot from reduced range.

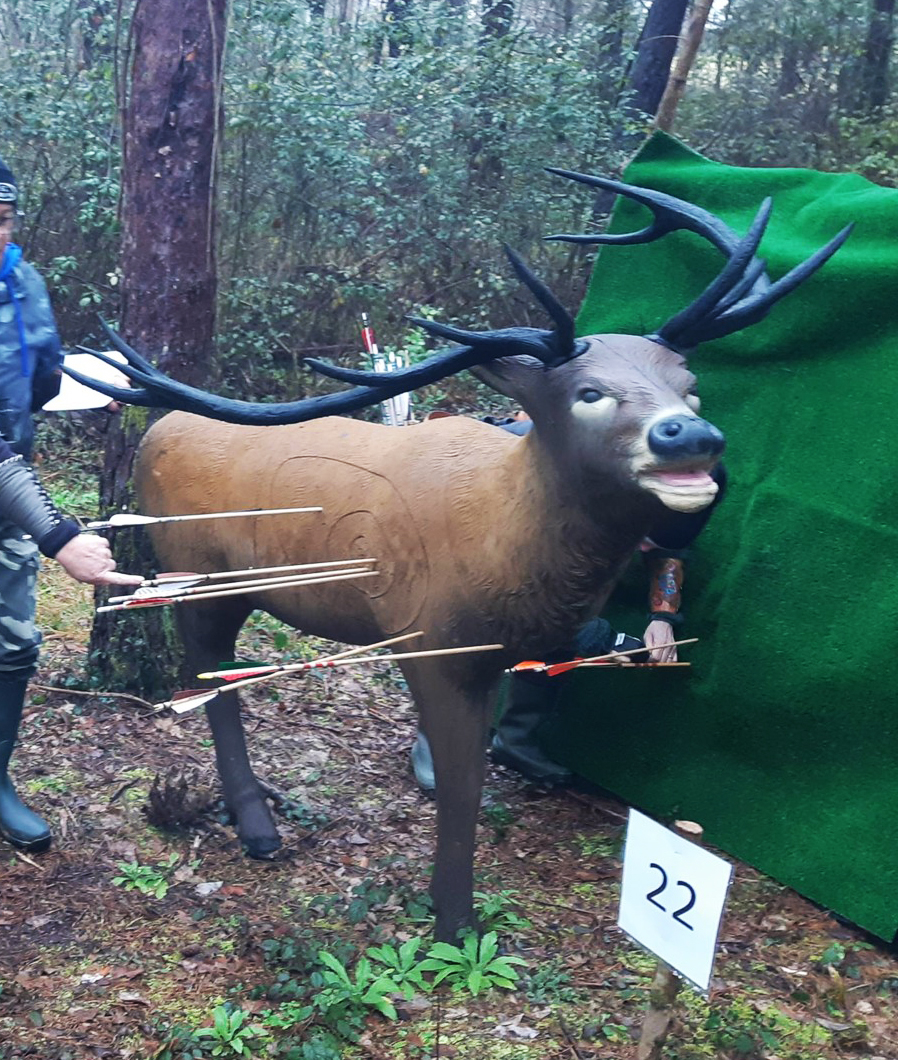
3D archery, rubber deer hit by arrows in vital areas clearly recognizable by circles

3D rounds use life-size models of game animals such as deer. It is most common to see unmarked distances in 3D archery, as the goal is to accurately recreate a hunting environment for competition, albeit a more loosely organized form of competition than other types of field archery. Though the goal is hunting practice, hunting tips (broadheads) are not used, as they would tear up the foam targets too much. Normal target or field tips, of the same weight as the intended broadhead, are used instead.

== WA Field ==
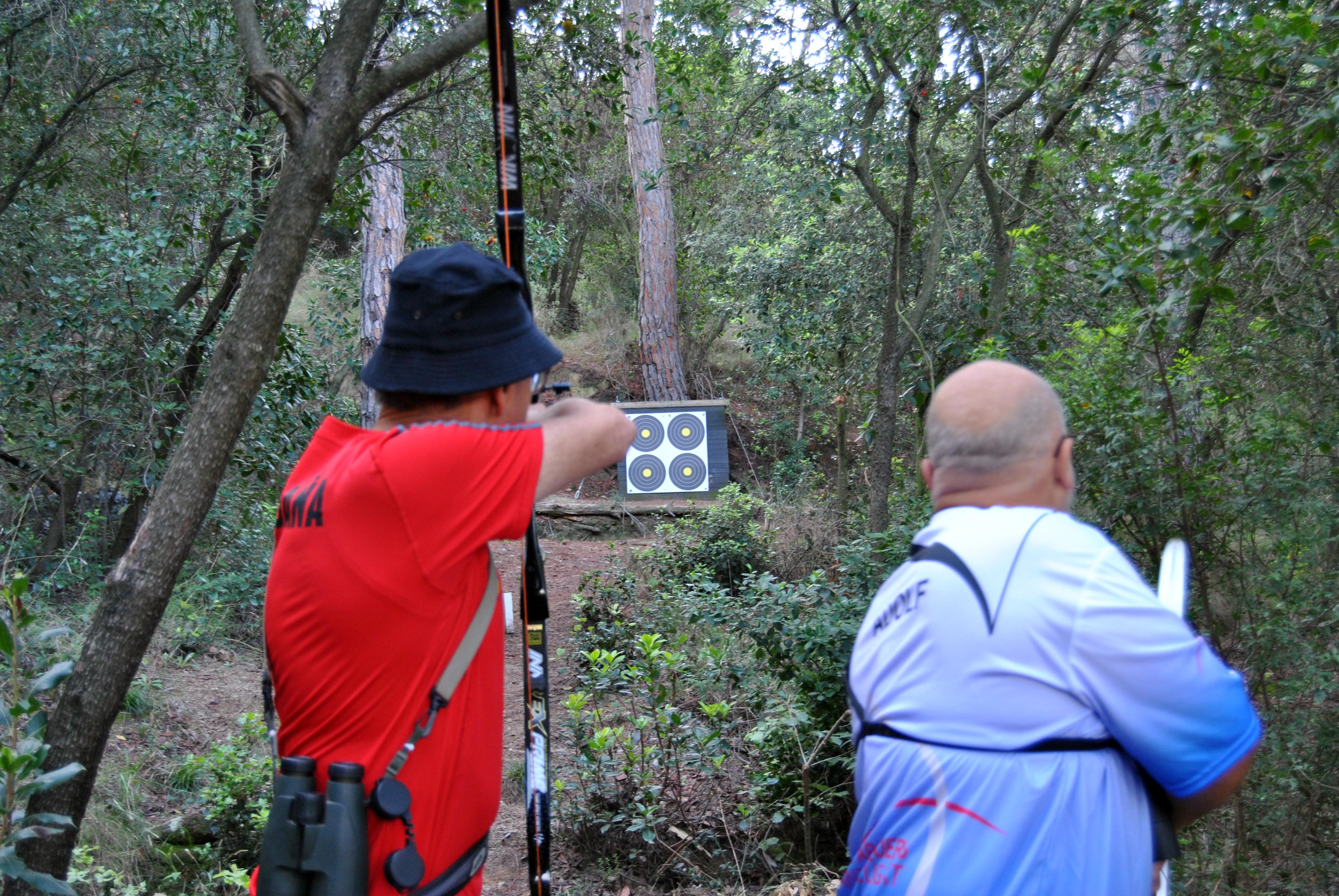
Field archers shooting at a World Archery target, Catalonia

World Archery divides outdoor archery into Field (with concentric circle targets) and 3D Archery with rubber animal silhouette targets.The information in this section is taken from Book 4 of the WA Constitution & Rules.

The World Archery Federation, commonly known as WA and formerly as FITA (Fédération Internationale de Tir à l'Arc), defines a suite of rounds based on a 24-target course.

Four target face sizes are specified: 80 cm (30 inches); 60 cm (25 inches); 40 cm (15 inches) and 20 cm (8 inches). Six target faces of each size are used on the course. For each target face size there are upper and lower distance limits for the various divisions of archer. Target faces have four black outer rings and a yellow spot, each with an equal width. The yellow spot is subdivided into two rings. The black rings score 1 point for the outermost to 4 points for the innermost. A hit in the outer yellow scores 5 points. A hit in the inner yellow scores 6 points. Before April 2008, the innermost yellow ring counted as an X (the number of Xs was used for tie-breaks) but only scored 5 points.

Shooting positions are marked by coloured pegs set at a distance from each target. Generally the red peg is set the furthest from the target, the blue peg is set nearer, and the yellow peg (or white peg in the UK) is set the nearest. The course layer may choose to vary this, though. Each peg is associated with one or more divisions of archer:

Pegs for archer divisions
Peg colour	Division
Red	Recurve and compound
Blue	Bare bow, cadet recurve and cadet compound
Yellow	Cadet bare bow

The UK operates some variations on this for junior archers. When shooting marked distances, the distance to the target is shown on each peg. On unmarked distances, the distance is not shown.

A WA 24 Marked round is shot on a single day using 24 targets at marked distances only. A WA 24 Unmarked round is shot on a single day using 24 targets at unmarked distances only. A WA 24 Mixed round is shot on a single day using 12 targets at marked distances and 12 targets at unmarked distances. A WA Combined Field round consists of a WA 24 Unmarked round shot on one day and a WA 24 Marked round shot on the same course the following day with the distances having been increased.

WA rules state that the lanes between the shooting positions and the targets must not be obstructed by branches or tree trunks.

Archers follow the course in groups of between two and four. The pegs are arranged so that two people can shoot from one peg at the same time. Each archer shoots three arrows at each target, making a round of 72 arrows.

== National Field Archery Society (UK) ==
In the United Kingdom, the National Field Archery Society (NFAS) sets the rules for many shoots, including Big Game and 3D shoots. Most of these consist of 36 or 40 targets or 2×20 targets. The NFAS is not affiliated to any international organisation. According to the NFAS Rules of Shooting:

The most common NFAS rounds have a "walk-up" format, where the archer starts at the furthest peg from the target; if the archer fails to score, they proceed to the next closest peg. For an adult of 16 and over these pegs are coloured red, white, and blue. The archer is allowed a maximum of three shots per target.

14 and 15 year olds shoot their first arrow from the white peg. If additional arrows are required, both of these are shot from the blue peg. Archers aged 12 years of age and under 14 shoot their first arrow from the blue peg. If additional arrows are required, both of these are shot from the yellow peg. Archers 9 years of age and under 12 years of age shoot their first arrow from the yellow peg. If additional arrows are required, these are also shot from the yellow peg. Archers aged under 9 years of age ('Cubs under 9') shoot their first arrow from the orange peg. If additional arrows are required, these are also shot from the orange peg. The points scored for the under 16 pegs follow the same format as the adult 1st, 2nd and 3rd pegs.

Scoring for a typical Big Game round
Peg colour	Points		
Peg colour	Inner kill zone	Kill zone	Wound zone
Red	24	20	16
White	–	14	10
Blue	–	8	4

The inner kill zone is only used on some targets, and only for the first arrow shot from the furthest peg. The wound zone is marked by wound lines on 2D targets, or by any target hit outside the kill zone excluding the antlers, hooves and target base.

There are multiple classes including American flatbow, barebow, bowhunter, compound limited, freestyle, hunting tackle, longbow, primitive, traditional bowhunter, unlimited, and crossbow.

All archers attending these shoots must carry a valid NFAS card in order to shoot. The NFAS holds annual championships open to all members. Generally, two championships are held per year: the 3D Championships (in May) and the National Championships (in September). Participants for these events must have competed in three open shoots in the bow style that they wish to shoot, or have participated in a previous Championship.

== Archery Shooters Association (US) ==
Unlike the other governing bodies listed here, the ASA governs competitions solely in 3D archery. At national "pro-am" events, the ASA features numerous classes for adult men, women, seniors (age 50 and over), "super seniors" (60 and over), and "senior masters" (69 and over). The ASA also has four age-based classes for youth—"young adult" (age 15–17), "youth" (12–14), "eagle" (9–11), and "junior eagle" (6–8). Classes are also distinguished by whether the distances to the targets are known by the shooters, or unknown; the "known" classes also vary in distance. Shooters in "open" classes may use any compound or recurve bow, with associated equipment, unless specifically prohibited by other rules. Classes also exist for Olympic recurves, barebow recurves (in which bows must conform to WA barebow standards), and crossbows. ASA-affiliated clubs also conduct their own competitions with most if not all of the same classes, and ASA state federations have their own championship events. As with IFAA/NFAA events, broadheads are prohibited.

The scoring area is a large ring that surrounds a depiction of the animal's vital area. Several higher-value scoring rings are contained within this larger ring. In all cases, an arrow that touches the edge of a scoring ring receives the higher score. The rings are organized and scored as follows:

- Large ring surrounding body: 5 points
- First inner ring, resembling the animal's vital area: 8 points
- Small ring in upper right corner of vital area (if target faces left; reverse if target faces right): 14 points (used only in certain "special shooting events")
- Second inner ring within vital area, designated by a wider boundary: 8 points
- Third inner ring within vital area: 10 points
- Three small rings, organized diagonally, within third inner ring:
  - Top ring: 10 points, unless the shooter "called" it as a 12-point ring before the shot
  - Middle ring: 10 points
  - Bottom ring: 12 points, unless the shooter "called" the top ring, in which case hitting this ring is 10 points

== See also ==
- Target archery
- Clout archery
- History of archery
- Arrow
- Bow
- Field archery at the 2009 World Games
