= International Field Archery Association =

International association for the sport of field archery

The International Field Archery Association (IFAA), is an amateur sports association that represents 50,000 field archers in 40 member countries. It was founded in 1970.

IFAA promotes competition between international and national associations and formulates the rules governing international competition. It creates programmes that recognise archers for proficiency in all IFAA sanctioned competitions.

IFAA creates standards that differentiate between the amateur status and professional status of archers for competition as conducted by and/or sanctioned by the Association. It promotes the development, instruction, coaching and spreading of expertise.

IFAA is an international member of The Association for International Sport for All (TAFISA).
