= Shooting sports =

Sports involving firearms used to hit targets

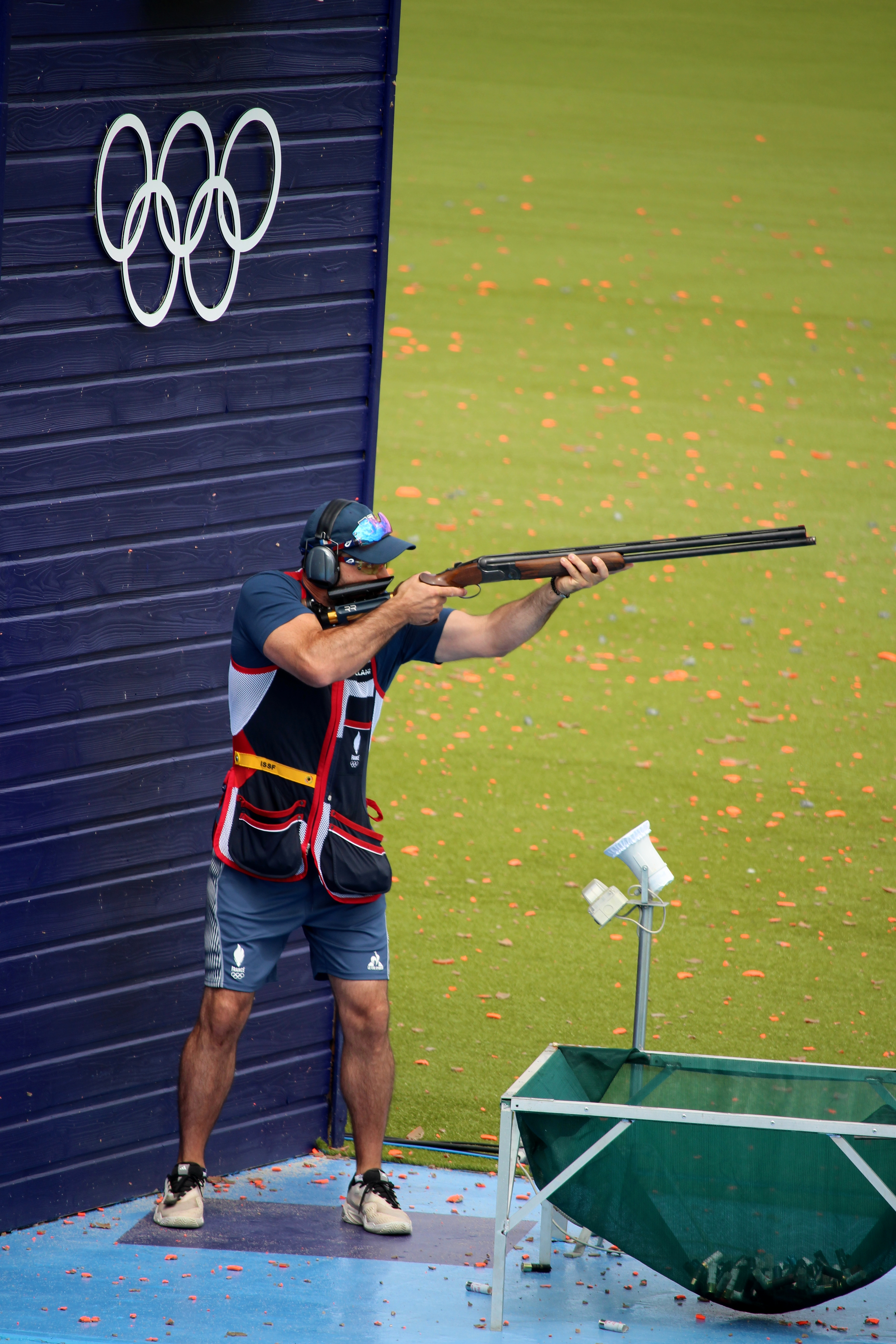
- French sport shooter Éric Delaunay at the 2024 Summer Olympics
- Highest governing body: Several organizations, see list
- Nicknames: Shooting
- First played: Switzerland in the second half of the 15th century

Characteristics
- Contact: No
- Team members: Yes or no, depending on competition
- Mixed-sex: Yes or no, depending on discipline
- Type: Indoor or outdoor
- Venue: Shooting range

Presence
- Olympic: 1896–1900, 1908–1924, since 1932
- Paralympic: since 1976

Pictogram for Shooting at the Summer Olympics

Shooting sports are a group of competitive and recreational sporting activities which focus on shooting accuracy, precision and speed. Shooting is the art of using ranged weapons, mainly firearms and airguns, such as handguns, rifles and shotguns, and also bows/crossbows.

Shooting sports can be categorized by equipment, shooting distance, targets, time limits and the degree of athleticism involved. Shooting sports may involve both team and individual competitions, and team performance is usually assessed by summing the scores of the individual team members. Due to the noise and high impact energy of the projectiles, which can be lethal, shooting sports are typically conducted at either designated permanent shooting ranges or temporary shooting fields in areas away from human settlements.

== History ==
=== Great Britain ===
The National Rifle Association (NRA) was founded in 1859 to raise the funds for an annual national rifle meeting "for the encouragement of Volunteer Rifle Corps and the promotion of Rifle-shooting throughout Great Britain".

=== United States ===
Target shooting was a favorite sport in colonial America, with the New England Puritans regularly testing their shooting skills for recreation and at militia training days. The Scotch Irish settlers on the frontier favored shooting matches sponsored by Tavern keepers. Turkey shoots were popular after harvest time. Contestants would pay an entry fee, and everyone who killed a tethered turkey at 110 yards for muskets or 165 yards for rifles could keep the bird. German gunsmiths in Pennsylvania began to manufacture Flintlock rifles in the 1720s, which became especially popular among hunters because of its long-range accuracy. It could be accurate to 200 yards. Along about 1820, percussion caps, and the locks that ignited them, became available, and nearly all new firearms began to be constructed using this ignition system. Many flintlock firearms were also subsequently converted to the percussion system, which was a relatively simple procedure that could be accomplished by local gunsmiths. Although percussion ignition did not add to the accuracy of the firearm, the time between when the firearm firing mechanism (or "lock") started the sequence that lead to the ignition of the propellant in the barrel, was shortened drastically. This made getting smaller shot groups on the target more attainable as the possibility of the firearm moving off the aiming point after the shooter pressed the trigger was lessened. This shortened ignition time, which is referred to as "lock time" was (and still is) a very important factor in target shooting. The closed design of the percussion system materially improved reliability of the firearm, especially in rainy or damp conditions. The faster "lock time" also made hitting fast-moving aerial targets with a cloud of tiny lead pellets ("shot") fired from a smooth-bore firearm a real possibility. Practicing for game hunting by shooting at artificial aerial targets launched from spring-powered launching devices ("traps") became highly popular and led to the development of the modern Trap, Skeet, and Sporting Clays shooting sports.

In 1831 a sportsman club in Cincinnati Ohio held a competitive shoot at pigeons and quail released from ground traps. German ethnic communities set up athletic clubs and shooting clubs, especially in the Midwestern states In the 1850–1917. period Breach loading shotguns introduced in the 1860s, and the knowledge of rifles by Civil War soldiers, made trap shooting popular. However, there was human humanitarian opposition to killing live birds—and the passenger pigeon was dying out—so glass or clay targets were used instead.

Concerned over poor marksmanship during the American Civil War, veteran Union officers Col. William C. Church and Gen. George Wingate formed the National Rifle Association of America in 1871 for the purpose of promoting and encouraging rifle shooting on a "scientific" basis. In 1872, with financial help from New York state, a site on Long Island, the Creed Farm, was purchased for the purpose of building a rifle range. Named Creedmoor, the range opened in 1872, and became the site of the first National Matches until New York politics forced the NRAoA to move the matches to Sea Girt, New Jersey. The popularity of the National Matches soon forced the event to be moved to its present, much larger location: Camp Perry. In 1903, the U.S. Congress created the National Board for the Promotion of Rifle Practice (NBPRP), an advisory board to the Secretary of the Army, with a nearly identical charter to the NRAoA. The NBPRP (now known as the Civilian Marksmanship Program) also participates in the National Matches at Camp Perry.

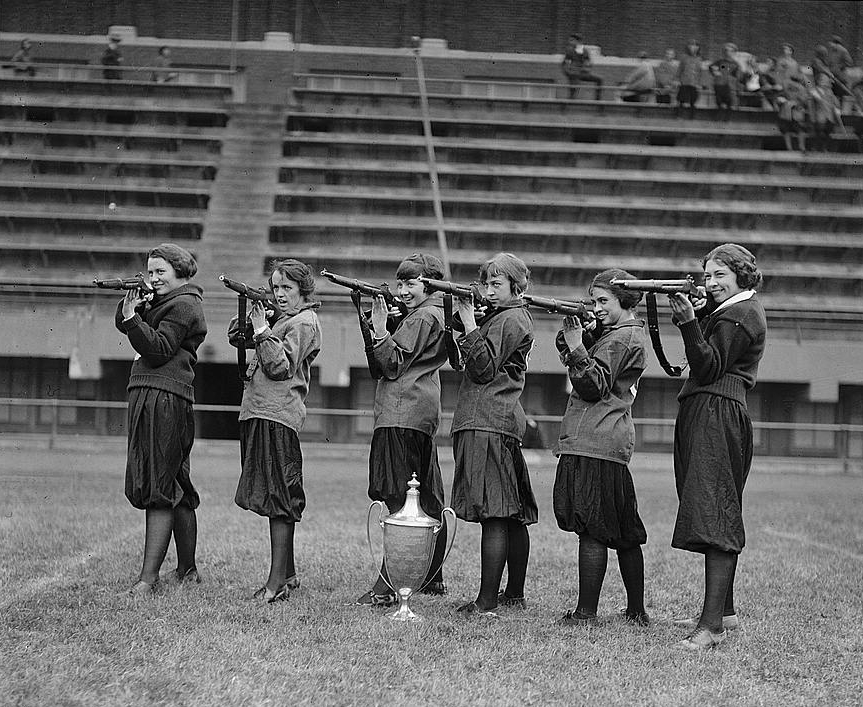
Girls' rifle team at Central High, Washington, DC, November 1922

In 1903, the NRA of America began to establish rifle clubs at all major colleges, universities, and military academies. By 1906, youth programs were in full swing with more than 200 boys competing in the National Matches. Today, more than one million youth participate in shooting sports events and affiliated programs through groups such as 4-H, the Boy Scouts of America, the American Legion, U.S. Jaycees, NCAA, The USA High School Clay Target League, the Scholastic Clay Target Program, National Guard Bureau, ROTC, and JROTC.

=== Olympics ===
French pistol champion and founder of the modern Olympics, Pierre de Coubertin, participated in many of these early competitions. This fact certainly contributed to the inclusion of five shooting events in the 1896 Olympics. Over the years, the events have been changed a number of times in order to keep up with technology and social standards. The targets that formerly resembled humans or animals in their shape and size have are now a circular shape in order to avoid associating the sport with any form of violence. At the same time, some events have been dropped and new ones have been added. The 2004 Olympics featured three shooting disciplines (rifle, pistol, and shotgun) where athletes competed for 51 medals in 10 men's and 7 women's events—slightly fewer than the previous Olympic schedule.

In the Olympic Games, the shooting sport has always enjoyed the distinction of awarding the first medals of the Games. Internationally, the International Shooting Sport Federation (ISSF) has oversight of all Olympic shooting events worldwide, while National Governing Bodies (NGBs) administer the sport within each country.

== Competition disciplines ==
Shooting at the Summer Olympics includes fifteen medal events, covering seven disciplines. Medal events are evenly distributed between rifle, pistol and shotgun with five events each. Three Mixed Pairs events were introduced to ensure gender equity between men's and women's events. They replaced 50m Prone Rifle, 50m Free Pistol and Double Trap which were all men-only events.

Rifle

- 50 meter rifle three positions (individual - men and women)
- 10 meter air rifle (individual - men and women)
- 10 meter air rifle (mixed pairs)

Pistol

- 25 meter rapid fire pistol (individual - men)
- 25 meter sport pistol (individual - women)
- 10 meter air pistol (individual - men and women)
- 10 meter air pistol (mixed pairs)

Shotgun

- Trap (men and women)
- Skeet (individual - men and women)
- Skeet (mixed pairs)

== Gun shooting sports ==
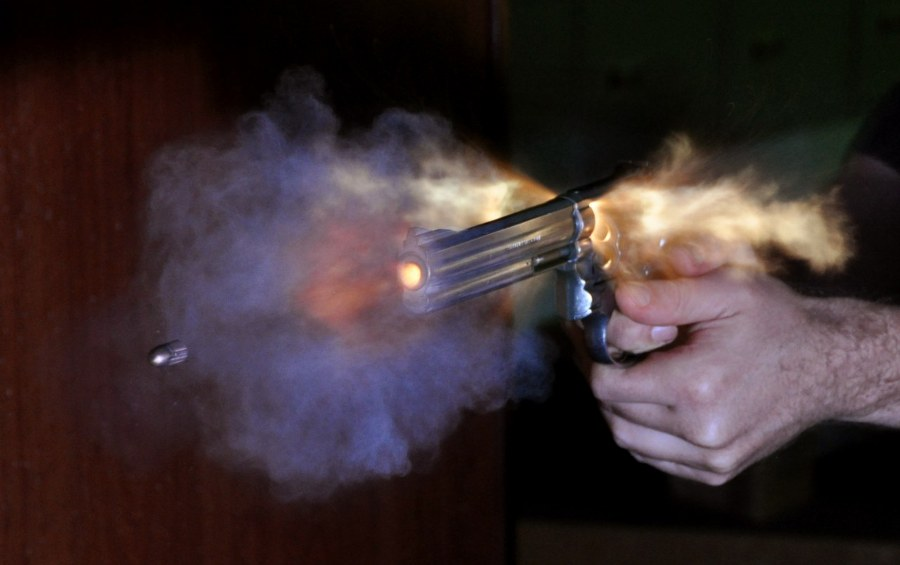
High-speed photography of the smoke of burnt gunpowder and a .38 Special bullet fired out of a Smith & Wesson Model 686 revolver

Gun shooting sports are shot with either firearms or air guns, which can be handguns, rifles or shotguns.

Handguns are handheld small arms designed to be shot off-hand without needing a shoulder stock. The two main subtypes of handguns are pistols and revolvers. They are much more convenient to carry in general, but usually have a shorter effective range and less accuracy compared to long guns such as rifles. In shooting sports, revolvers and semi-automatic pistols are the most commonly used.

A rifle is a long gun with a rifled barrel, and requires the use of both hands to hold and brace against the shoulder via a stock in order to shoot steadily. They generally have a longer range and greater accuracy than handguns, and are popular for hunting. In shooting sports, bolt-action or semi-automatic rifles are the most commonly used.

A shotgun is similar to a rifle but often smoothbore and larger in caliber, and typically fires either a shell containing many smaller scattering sub-projectiles called shots, or a single large projectile called a slug. In shooting sports, shotguns are more often over/under-type break action or semi-automatic shotguns, and the majority of shotgun events are included in clay pigeon shooting.

=== Bullseye shooting ===
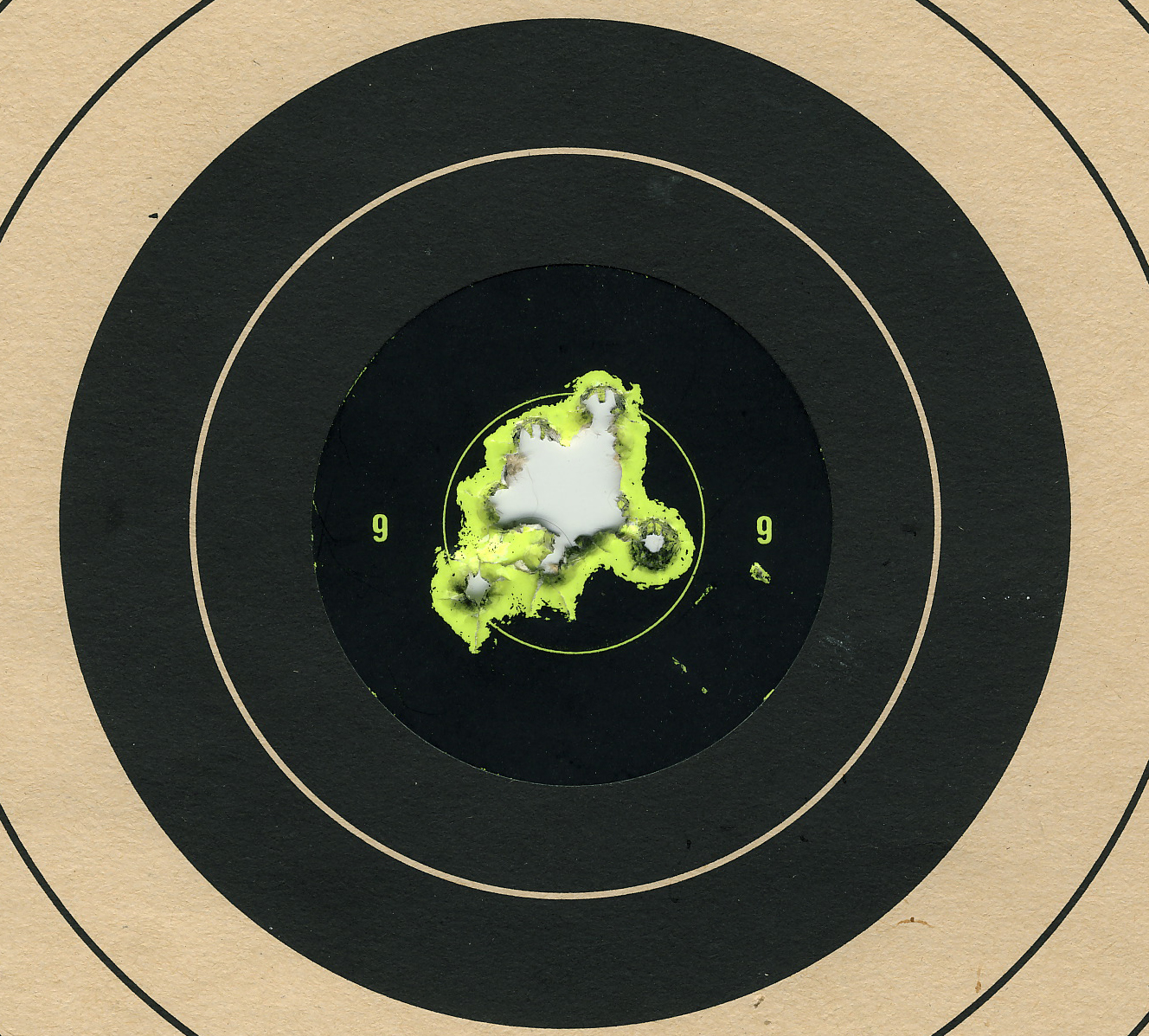
A round shooting target with several hits in the center, which is called "bullseye"

Bullseye shooting is a category of pistol and rifle shooting disciplines where the objective is to achieve as many points as possible by hitting a round shooting target as close to the middle as possible with slow precision fire. These disciplines place a large emphasis on precision and accuracy through sight picture, breath and trigger control. Fixed and relatively long time limits give the competitors time to concentrate for a perfect shot. An example of bullseye shooting is the ISSF pistol and rifle disciplines, but there are also many other national and international disciplines which can be classified as bullseye shooting. The shooting distances are typically given in round numbers, such as 10, 25, 50, 100, 200 or 300 meters depending on firearm type and discipline. Competitions are usually shot from permanent shooting ranges and with the same target arrangement and distance from match to match. Usually the competitors each have their own shooting target and shoot beside each other simultaneously. Because of the relatively simple match format, beginners are often recommended bullseye shooting in order to learn the fundamentals of marksmanship. Bullseye shooting is part of the Summer Olympic Games, and a considerable amount of training is needed to become proficient.

==== Bullseye shooting with handguns ====
- There are six individual ISSF pistol shooting events, comprising three events currently included in the Olympic programme—10 m Air Pistol, 25 m Pistol, and 25 m Rapid Fire Pistol—and three events not included in the Olympic programme but contested at ISSF World Championships: 25 m Centre Fire Pistol, 25 m Standard Pistol, and 50 m Pistol. Shooting has been part of the Olympic programme since the first modern Olympic Games in 1896. ISSF pistol disciplines include both precision and rapid-fire formats and are contested at distances of 10, 25, and 50 metres, depending on the event, with competitors required to hold and fire the pistol using one hand only under ISSF rules. In Great Britain (except Northern Ireland), it is no longer possible to practise for some Olympic pistol events following the Firearms (Amendment) (No. 2) Act 1997, enacted in response to the Dunblane massacre, which prohibited private possession of cartridge pistols, requiring British Olympic pistol shooters to train abroad.
- The CISM Rapid Fire match is similar to the ISSF 25 meter rapid fire pistol event.
- NRA Precision Pistol is a bullseye shooting event where up to 3 handguns of differing calibers are used. Its history is almost as old as ISSF events. Shooters must fire the pistol one-handed at 6- and 8-inch bullseye targets placed 25 and 50 yards downrange respectively.
- Precision Pistol Competition (PPC), was originally a police shooting program started in 1960 by the National Rifle Association of America.
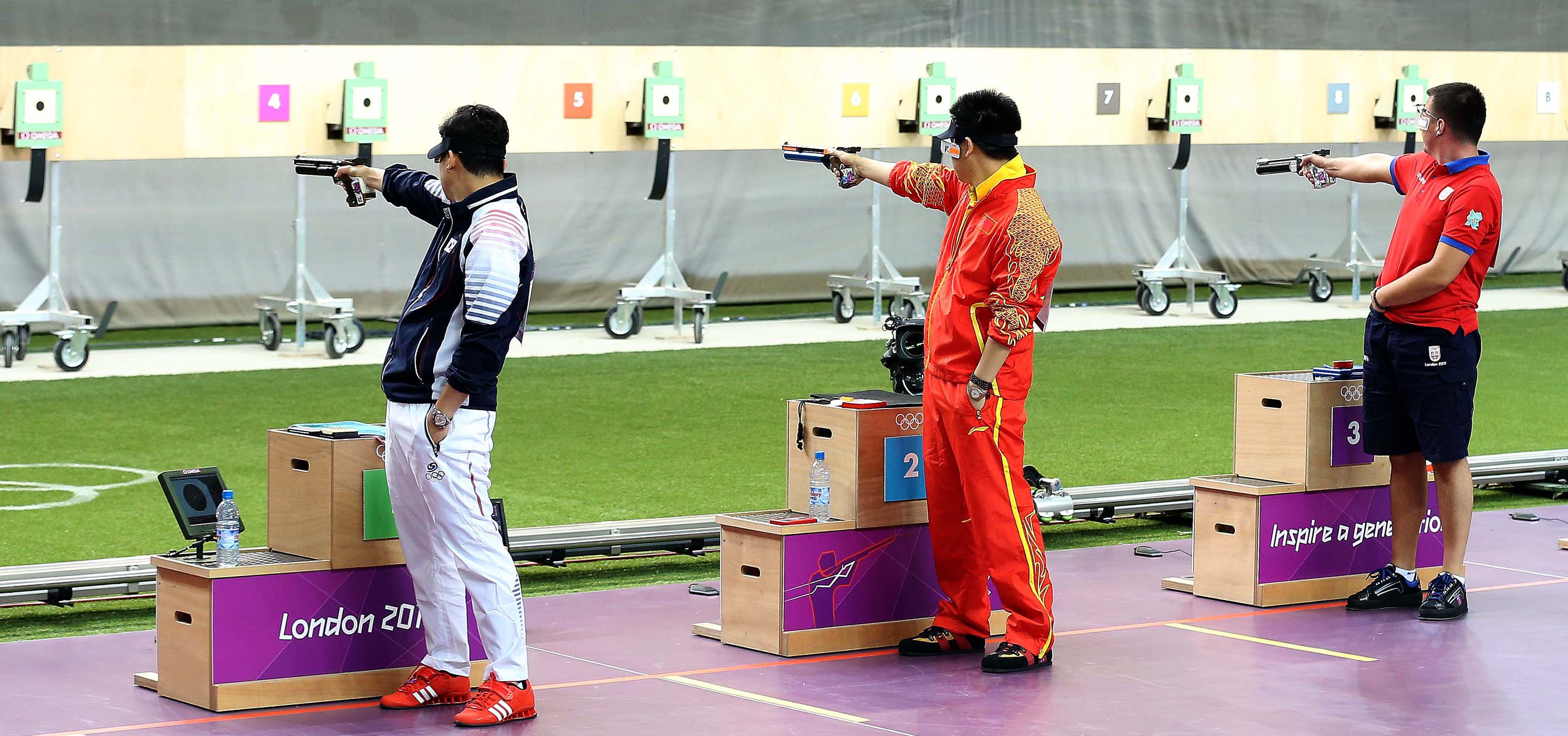
The Men's ISSF 10 meter air pistol final in the 2012 Summer Olympics

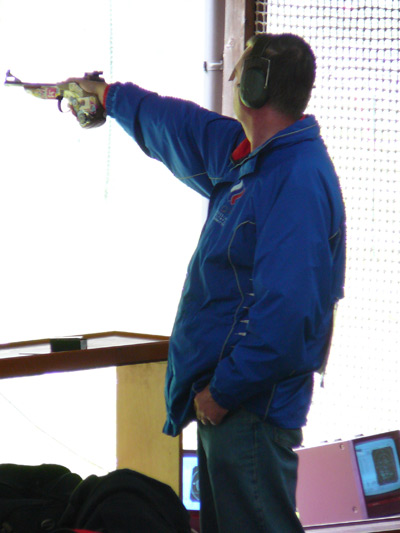
Boris Kokorev from Russia during the ISSF 50 meter pistol 2007 World Cup in Munich

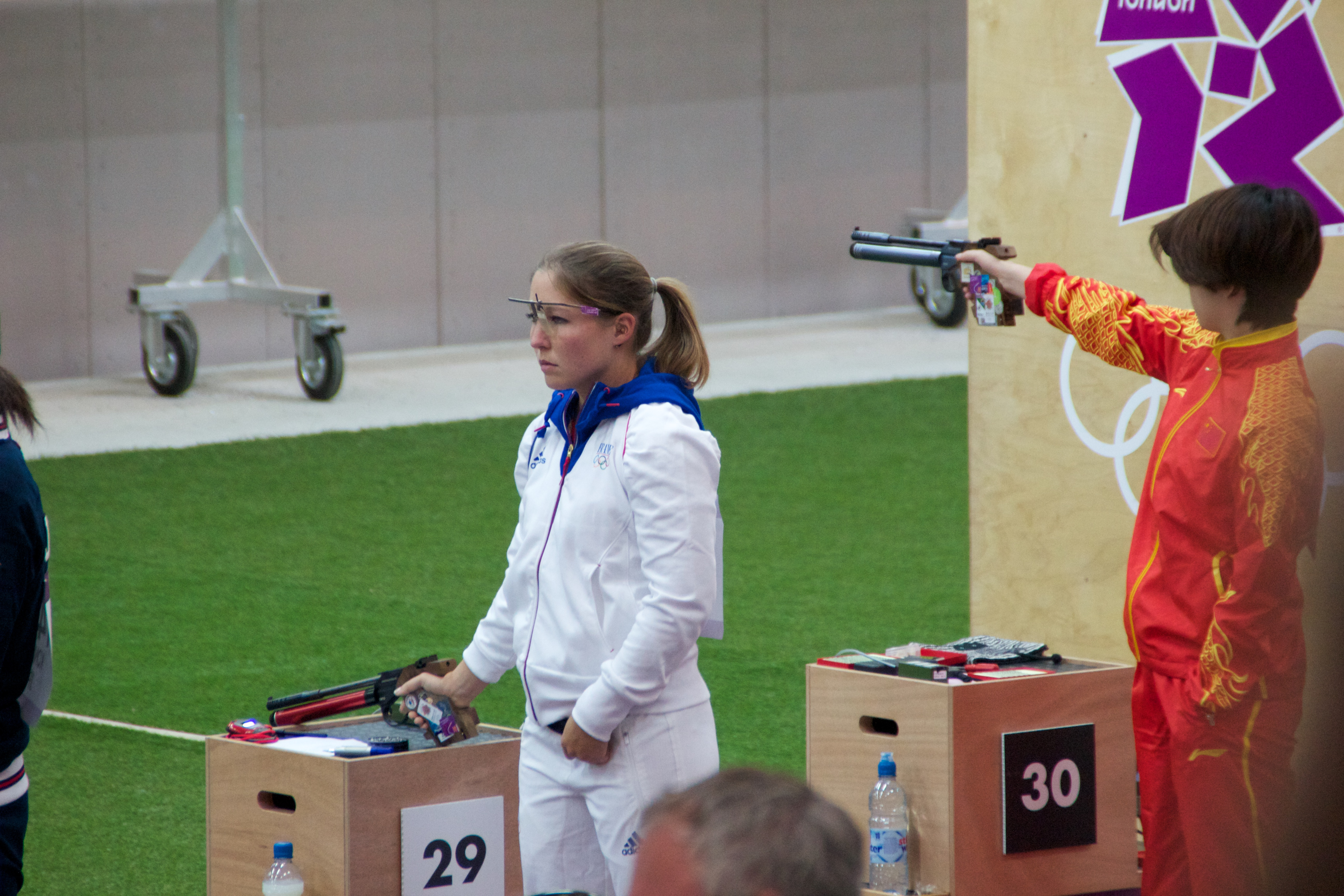
Women's 10 meter air pistol at the 2012 Summer Olympics

==== Bullseye shooting with rifles ====
- The six rifle ISSF shooting events (including two Olympic events: 10 meter air rifle and 50 meter rifle three positions) consist of slow-fire target shooting from distances of 10 or 50 or 300 metres (33 or 164 or 984 ft).
- Fullbore target rifle involves prone shooting with single-shot rifles at distances of 300yds to 1200yds. It is particularly popular in Britain and within the Commonwealth of Nations (mostly former constituents of the British Empire).
- Gallery rifle shooting is popular in the UK, using carbine rifles chambered in pistol calibres. Gallery Rifle was introduced as a substitute for many pistol shooting disciplines following the 1997 handgun ban.
- High Power Rifle (also known as "Across the Course" or 'traditional' High power) in the United States is a format that shoots 3-position (standing, kneeling, or sitting, and prone) at 200, 300, and 600 yards. The term "Across the Course" is used because the match format requires the competitors to shoot at different distances to complete the course of fire.
- Military Service Rifle shooting is a shooting discipline that involves the use of rifles that are used by military forces and law-enforcement agencies, both past and present use. Ex-military rifles, sniper rifles (both past and present) and civilian versions of current use service rifles are commonly used in the Military Service Rifle shooting competitions. It is popular in the United States and culminates each year with the National Matches being held at Camp Perry, Ohio. Some countries have outlawed civilian shooting at human-silhouette targets; silhouette targets are not used in the National Match Course of Fire. Bullseye targets are used. High Power Rifle competition often is held at the same events as Service Rifle, such as the U.S. national championships each year at Camp Perry. High Power competitors generally are civilians using whatever rifles they prefer within the rules, whereas Service Rifle entrants are limited to current or previous U.S. armed forces weapons. Under NRA of America rules only certain matches allow optical sights, normally those conducted at ranges over 600 yards.
- Project Appleseed is a rifle marksmanship program by The Revolutionary War Veterans Association that teaches both rifle marksmanship and oral history regarding the American Revolutionary War. It shoots 3-position (standing, sitting, and prone) at 25 meters at reduced scale targets, simulating shooting at 100, 200, 300, and 400 yards. The techniques taught easily apply to transitioning to High Power Rifle.
- Full bore and small bore rifle shooting in the United Kingdom.
- Three position airgun competitions, popular in the United States.
- Four position small bore is a popular sport in the U.S., which adds Sitting to the Three positions used internationally.
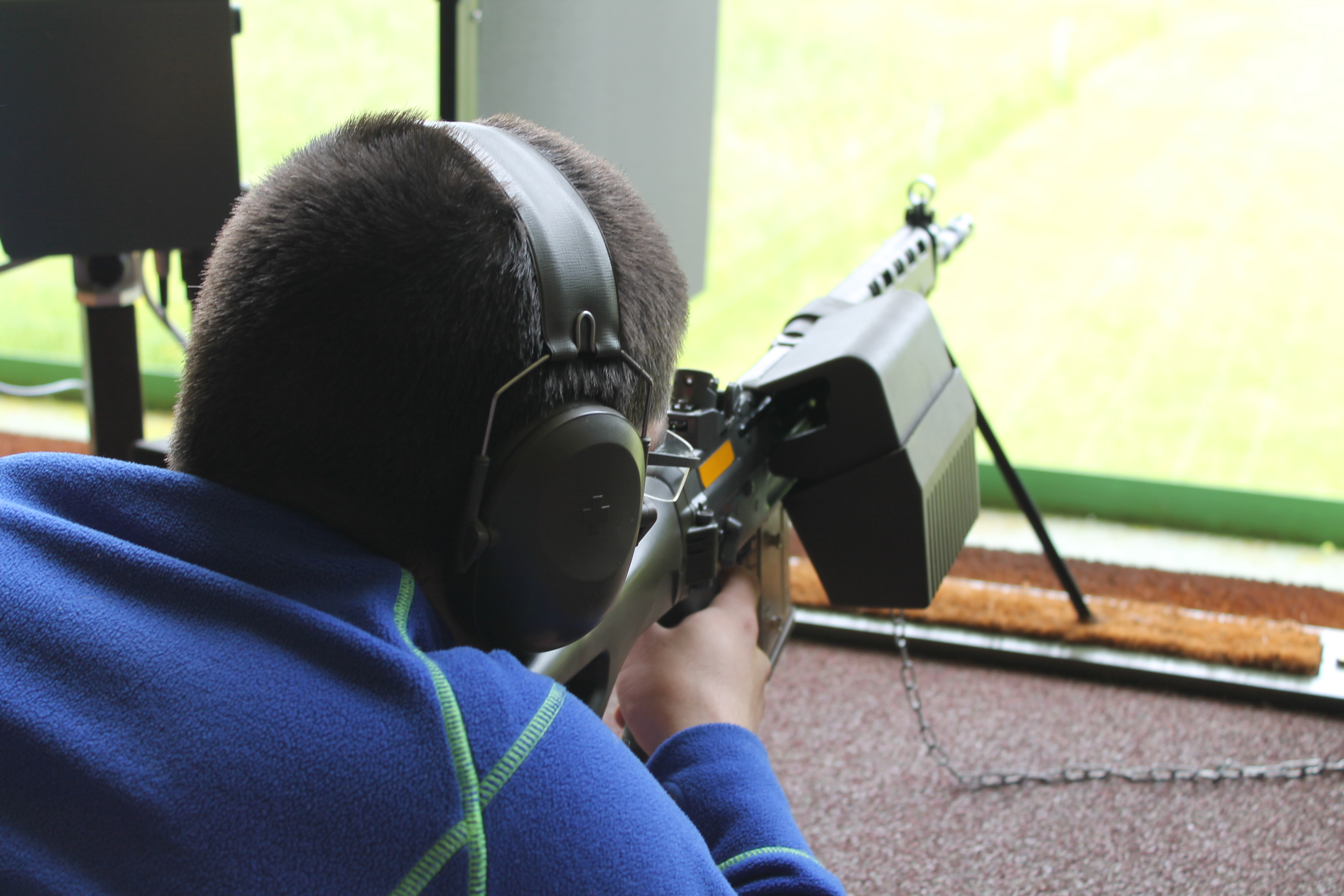
A junior shooter in Switzerland target shoots with a SIG 550. A brass catcher is fitted to avoid disturbing other shooters with the ejection.

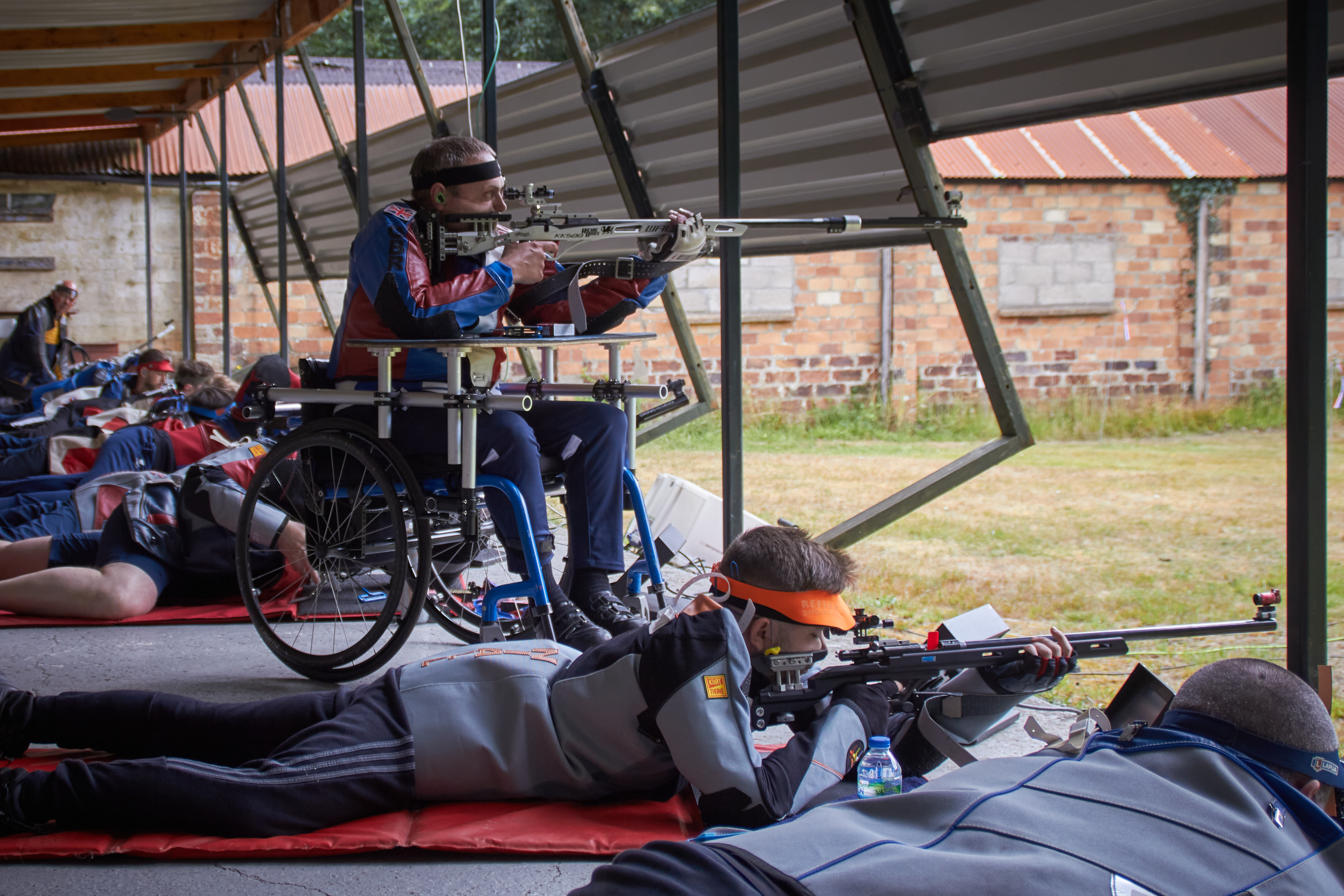
Competitors shoot in an ISSF 50 metre prone competition in Wales. A para-athlete shoots from a chair.

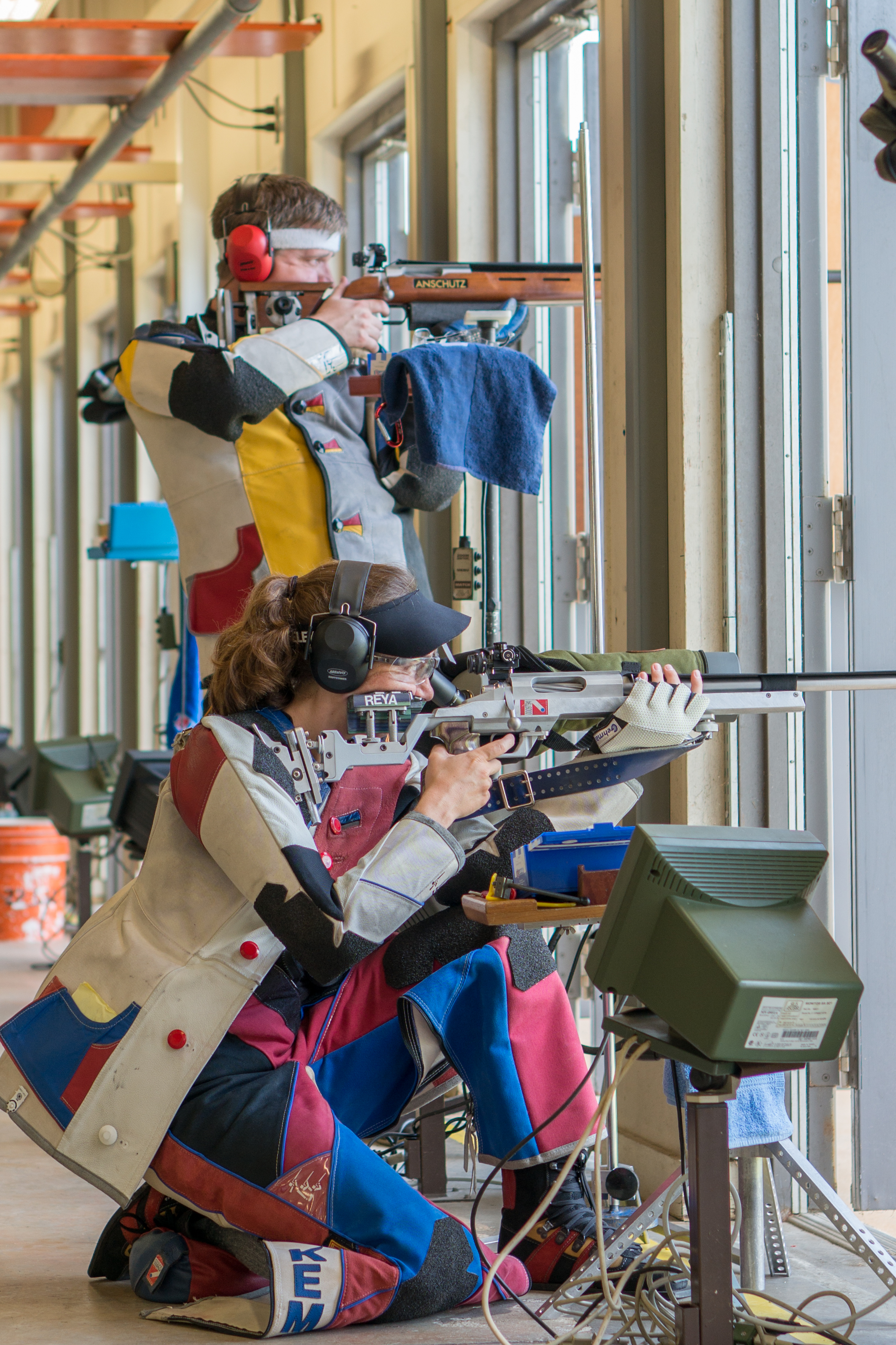
Two shooters during an ISSF 300 meter rifle three positions (prone, kneeling and standing)

=== Field shooting ===
Field-Shooting or Terrain-Shooting refer to a set of pistol and rifle shooting disciplines that usually are shot from temporary shooting ranges in outdoor terrain at varying (and sometimes unknown) distances, rather than at permanent shooting ranges at fixed distances.

==== Field shooting with handguns ====
- Nordic Handgun Field-Shooting competitions are shot with pistol and revolver in different classes depending on equipment, with classes up from small-bore .22 LR to large-bore .500 S&W Magnum. Matches are held outdoor throughout the year with varied shooting targets and distances, and are arranged by the Norwegian Shooting Association (NSF), the Danish Gymnastics and Sports Associations (DGI Shooting) and the Swedish Pistol Shooting Association (SPSF).
- Swiss field shooting with handguns is a discipline under the Swiss Shooting Sport Federation arranged under a common Swiss ruleset, and has been part of the annual field shooting championship since 1919 alongside field shooting with rifles, which have been arranged since 1899.
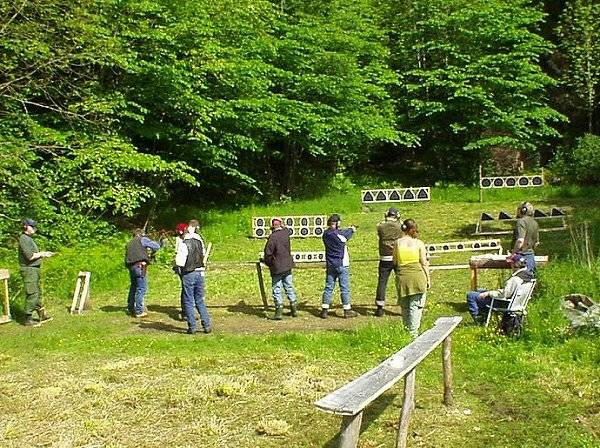
Nordic Handgun Field Shooting in Arendal, Norway in 2007

==== Field shooting with rifles ====
- Nordic Rifle Field-Shooting are shot with either small-bore .22 LR cartridge at 100 meters, or intermediate (such as .223 Remington or 6mm BR) or battle rifle cartridges (such as the 6.5×55mm, .308 Winchester or the .30-06 Springfield) at distances from 100 to 650 meters. With 200 and 300 meters being ordinary shooting distance in Nordic Bullseye Rifle-Shooting, those targets placed well beyond 300 meters in Rifle Field-Shooting means that the competition format also can be classified as a long range shooting discipline. Matches are usually held in the winter season with varied targets, and are arranged by the National Rifle Association of Norway (DFS), the Danish Gymnastics and Sports Associations (DGI Shooting) and the Swedish Shooting Sport Association (SvSF).
- Swiss field shooting with rifles is a discipline under the Swiss Shooting Sport Federation arranged under a common Swiss ruleset. The annual Swiss Field Shooting Championship has been held since 1899. From 1919, Swiss field shooting with handguns has also been a part of the Swiss Field Shooting Championship.
- Precision rifle competitions, like the Precision Rifle Series (PRS), is both a field and long range shooting discipline where rifles with intermediate or battle rifle cartridges are shot in the terrain at varying distances from about 10 to 1000 meters.
- Field Target is an outdoor air gun discipline originating in the United Kingdom, but gaining popularity worldwide. Hunter field target is a variation of field target.
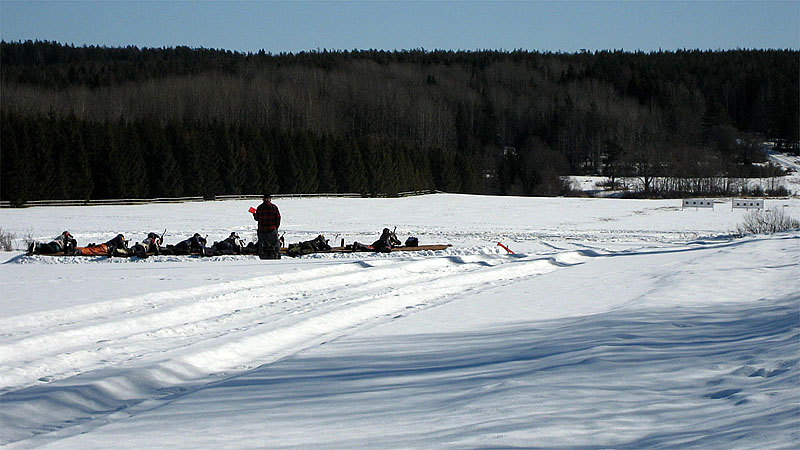
Nordic Rifle Field Shooting in Sweden during the winter in 2012

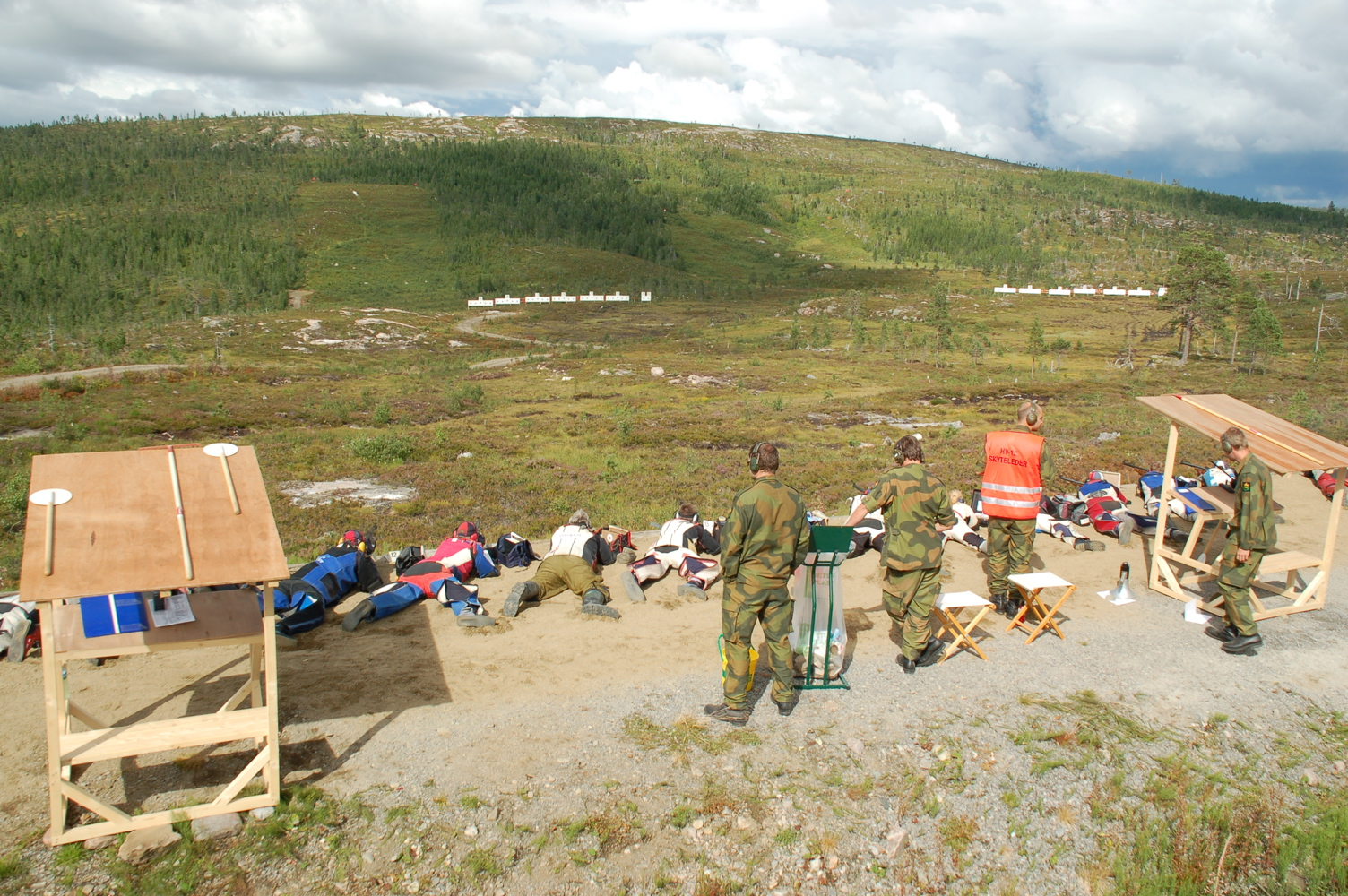
The Norwegian Rifle Field Shooting Championship at the 2007 Landsskytterstevnet

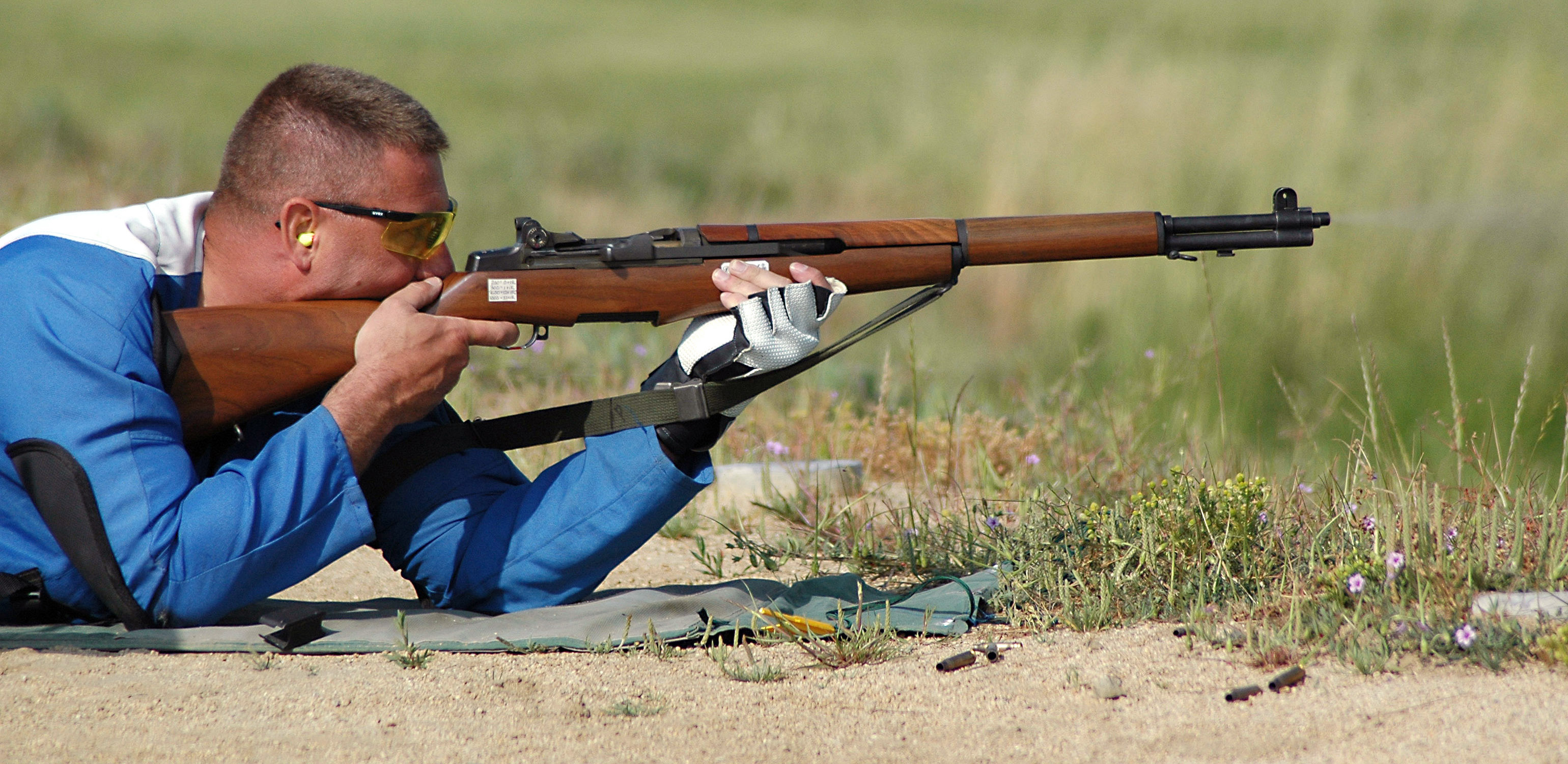
Field-like shooting competition in USA using a National Match M1

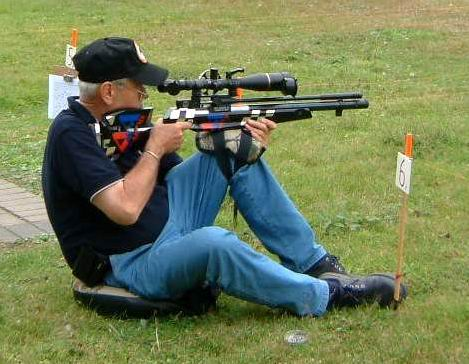
Field target shooting in Germany

=== Rapid fire ===
==== Rapid fire with handguns ====
- The ISSF 25 meter pistol and ISSF 25 meter rapid fire pistol events are contested at the Olympic Games.
- The Bianchi Cup, a fusion of IPSC (without the "run and gun" element) and bullseye shooting (except shot with two hands and going prone whenever rules allow it) where accuracy under tight time limits in four simulated scenarios, known as the "Event(s)", is the basis of this competition. Shooters must start with gun in the holster on every strings of fire and distances range from 10 to 50 yards.
- Fast draw, also known as quick draw, a form of pistol action shooting from North America, based on the romanticized art of the gunslingers in the American Old West, using traditional single action revolvers. But unlike Cowboy action shooting, Fast Draw is done with special blanks or wax bullets. While some competitions are strictly against the clock, with the fastest time winning, many are set up as head-to-head single or double elimination matches.
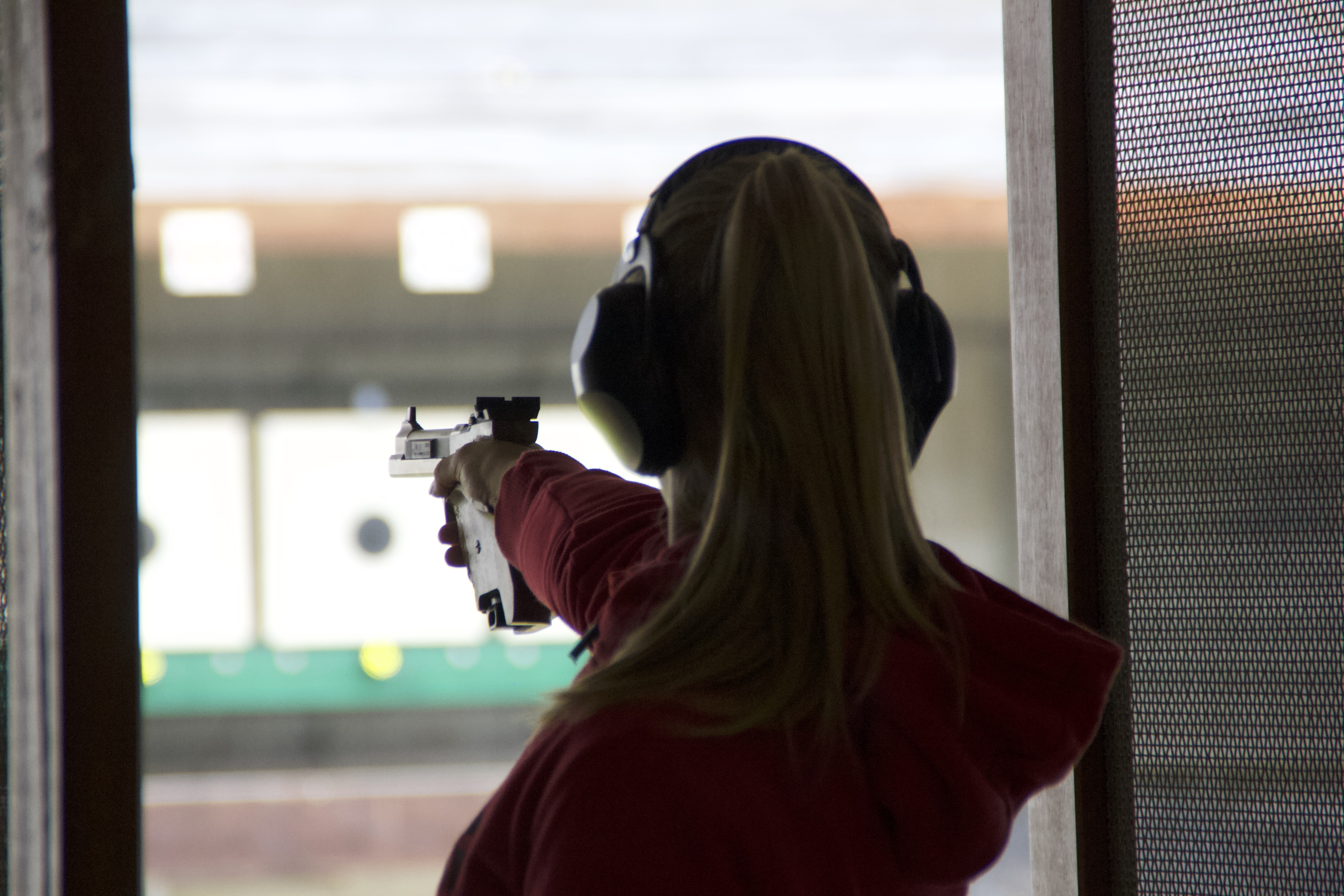
Female athlete competes in 25 meter pistol event.

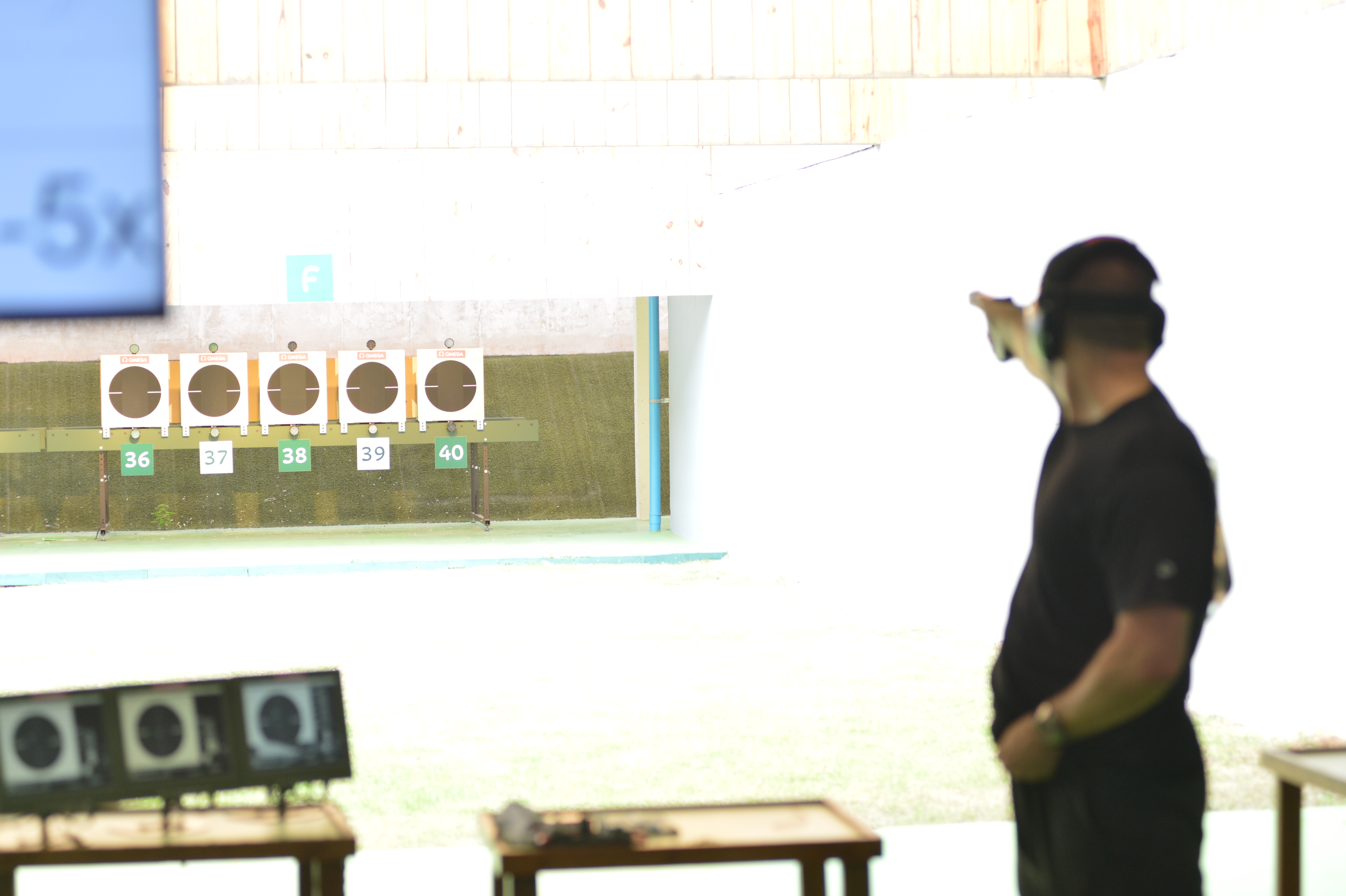
Keith Sanderson from USA during the ISSF 25 meter rapid fire pistol event at the 2016 Rio Olympic Games in Rio de Janeiro

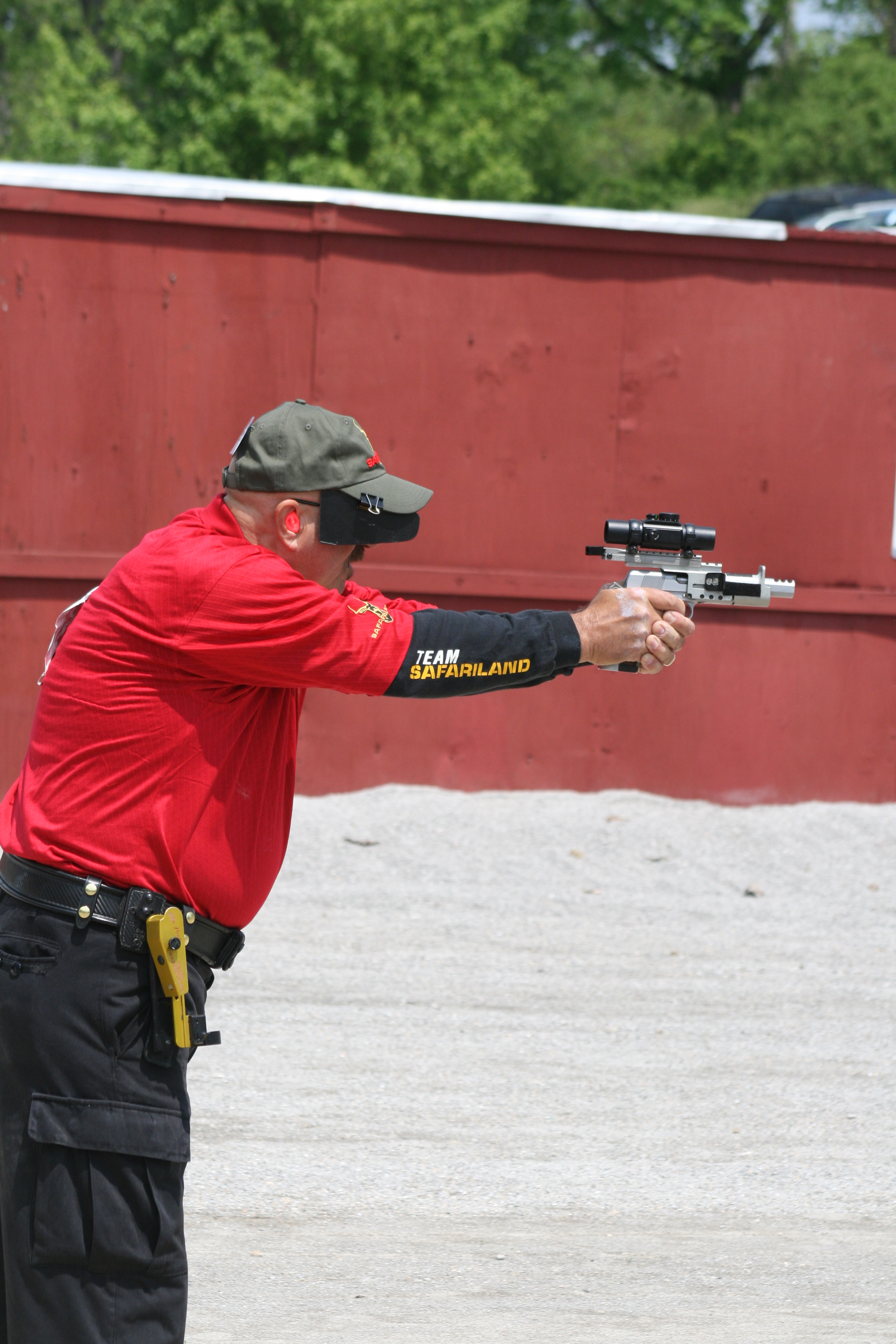
John Pride at the 2008 Bianchi Cup

==== Rapid fire with rifles ====
- The CISM Rapid Fire match is a sped-up version of the ISSF 300 m Standard Rifle event.
- Felthurtigskyting (literally Field Rapid Shooting) and Stangskyting are a type of variable rapid-fire rifle competitions popular in Scandinavia.
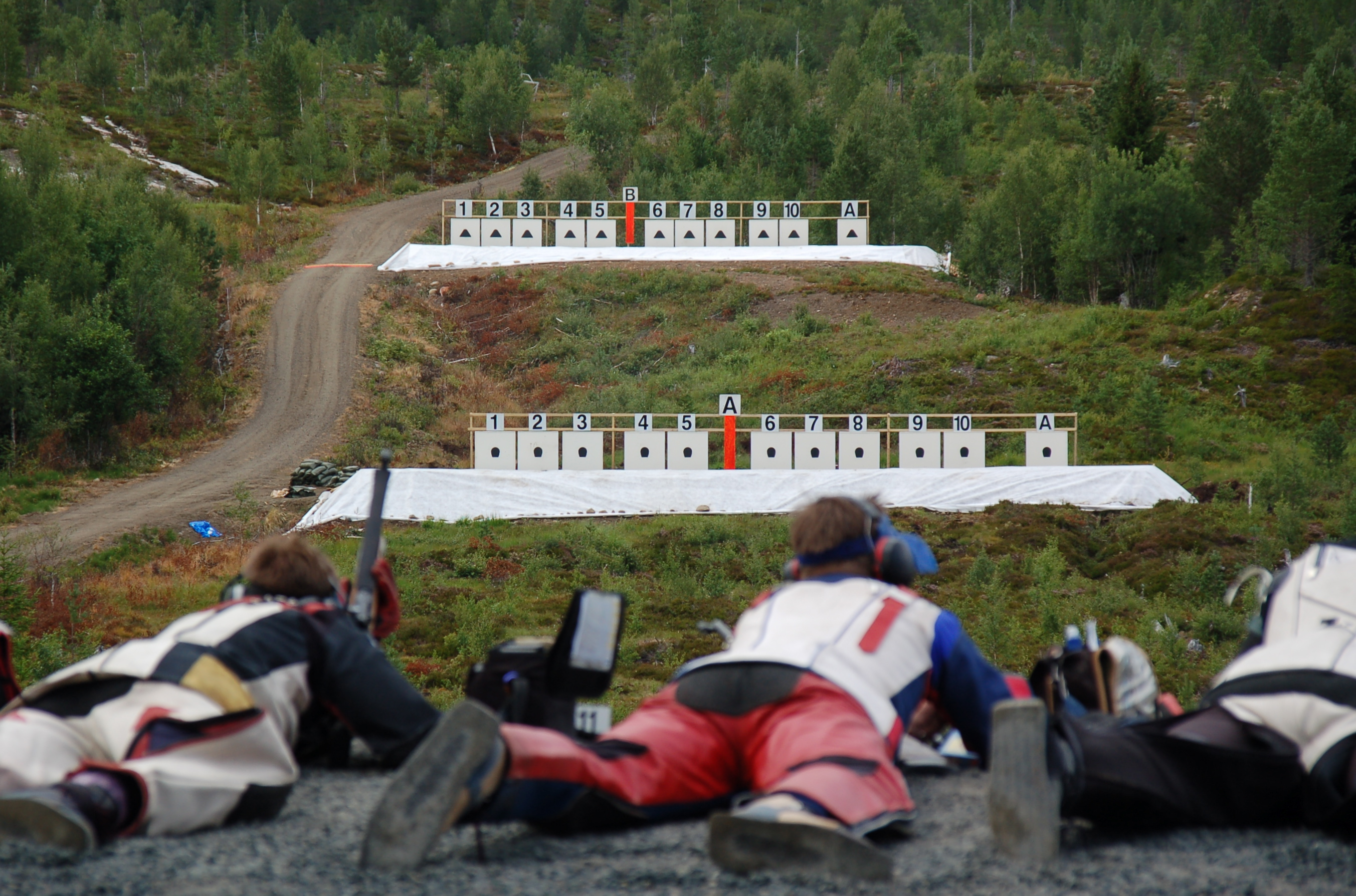
Stang-Shooting at the 2007 Landsskytterstevnet in Norway. The nearest targets are placed at 155 meters, the farthest at 221 meters.

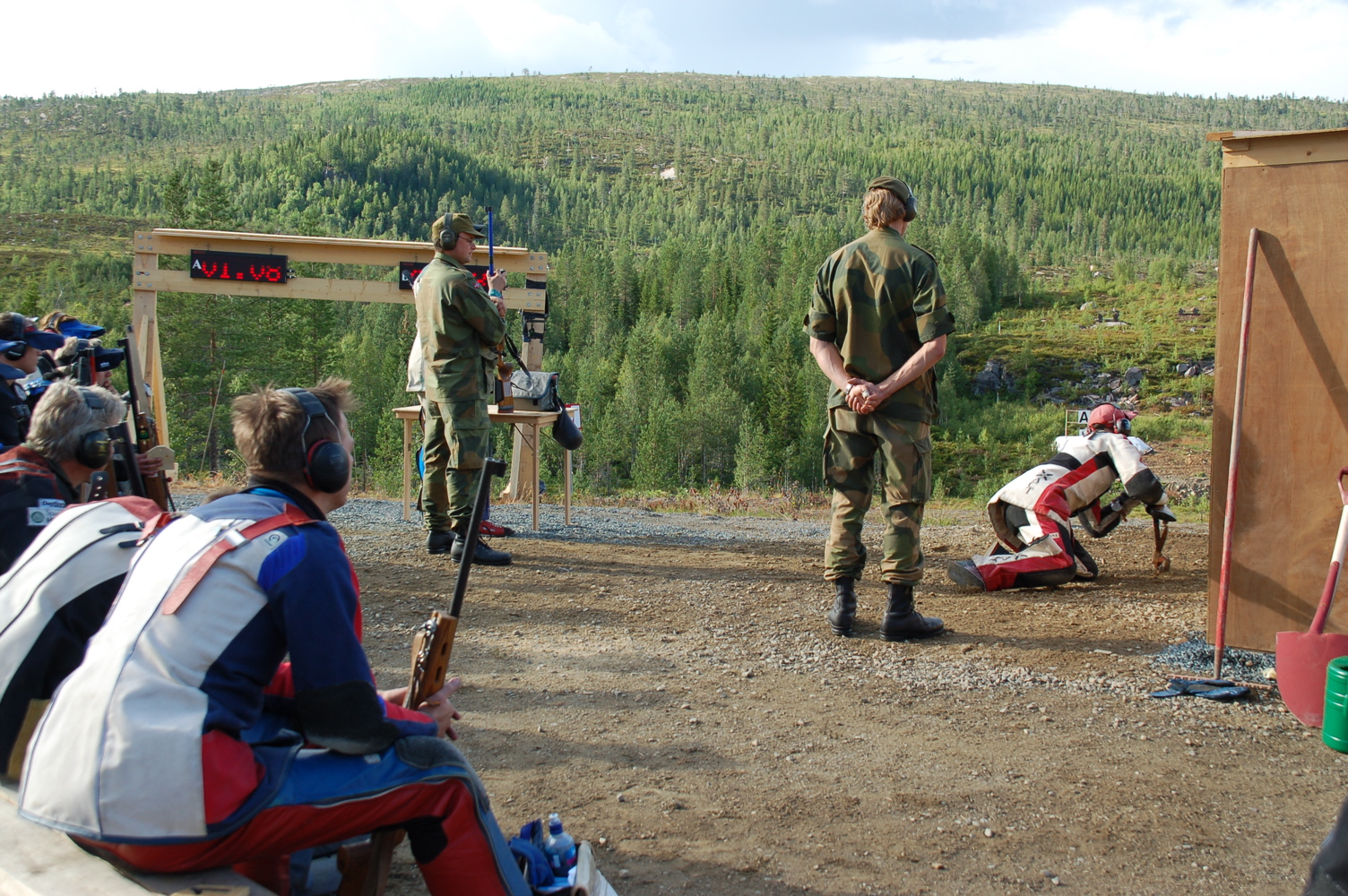
Field-Rapid-Shooting at the 2007 Landsskytterstevnet in Norway

=== Clay target ===
Clay pigeon shooting are shotgun disciplines shot at flying clay pigeon targets.

- The three Shotgun ISSF/ Olympic shooting events are all are based on quick reaction to clay targets thrown by machines called "Traps".
  - Skeet: Targets are either thrown in singles or doubles from two throwers called "traps" placed 40 meters apart.
  - Trap and Double Trap: Either one (trap) or two targets (double trap) are thrown from 15 meters in front of the shooter.
- The Fédération Internationale de Tir aux Armes Sportives de Chasse (FITASC) Compak Sporting is a type of shotgun sport shooting similar to sporting clays, trap and skeet.
- Other shotgun sports with (at least partial) international recognition include Sporting Clays, Down-The-Line/ATA and Five stand.
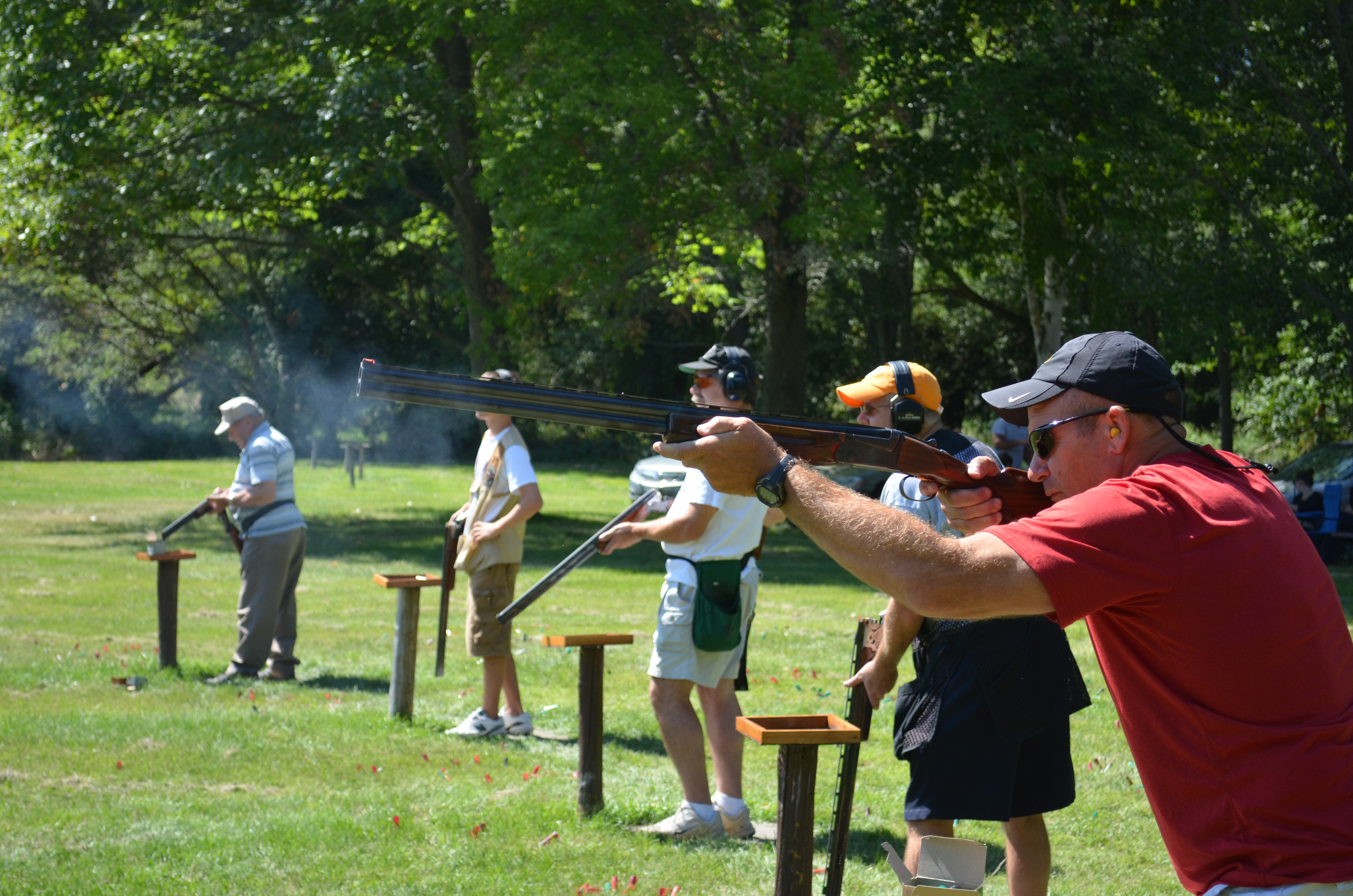
Trap shooting in USA

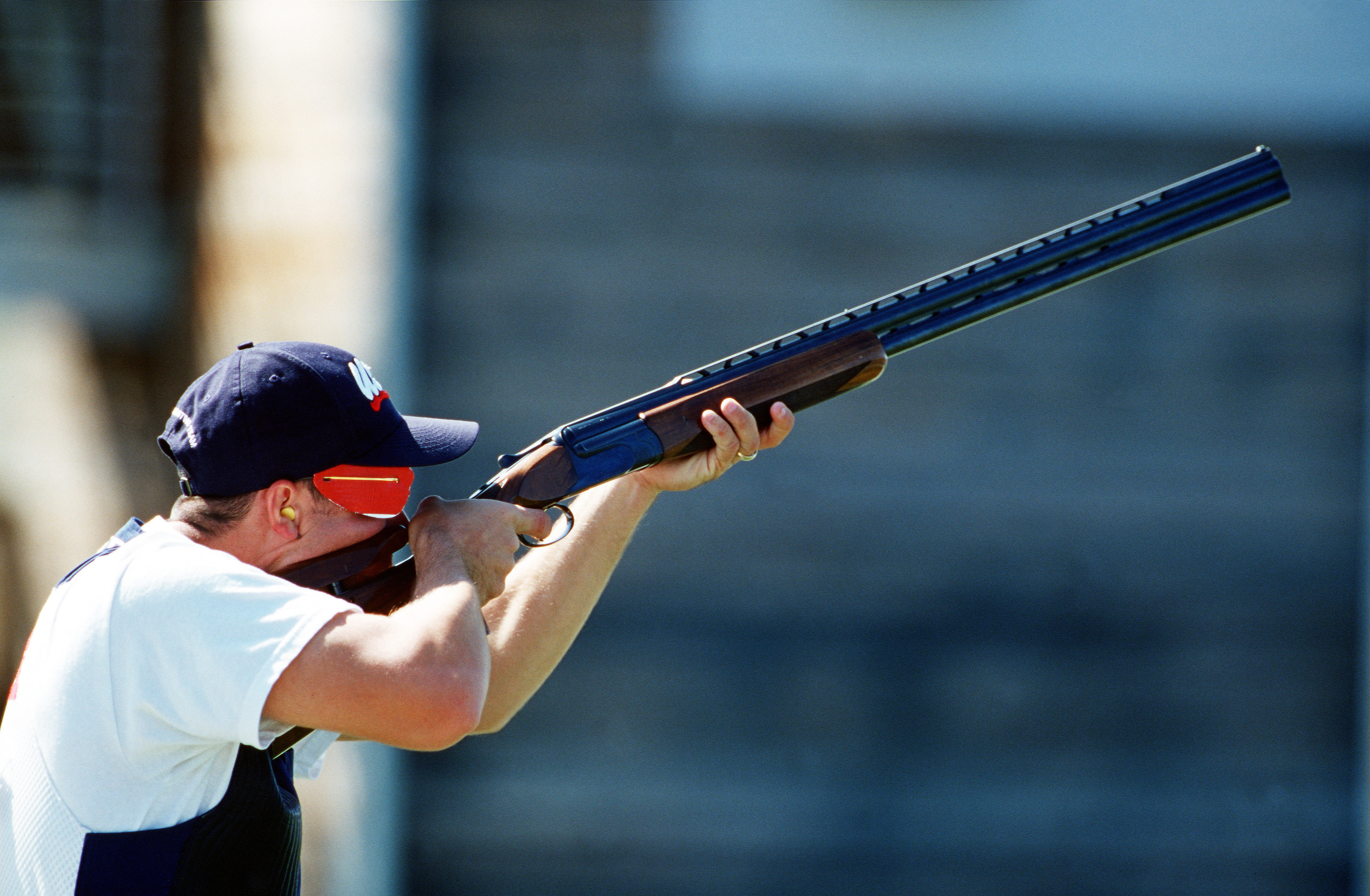
Skeet shooting in USA

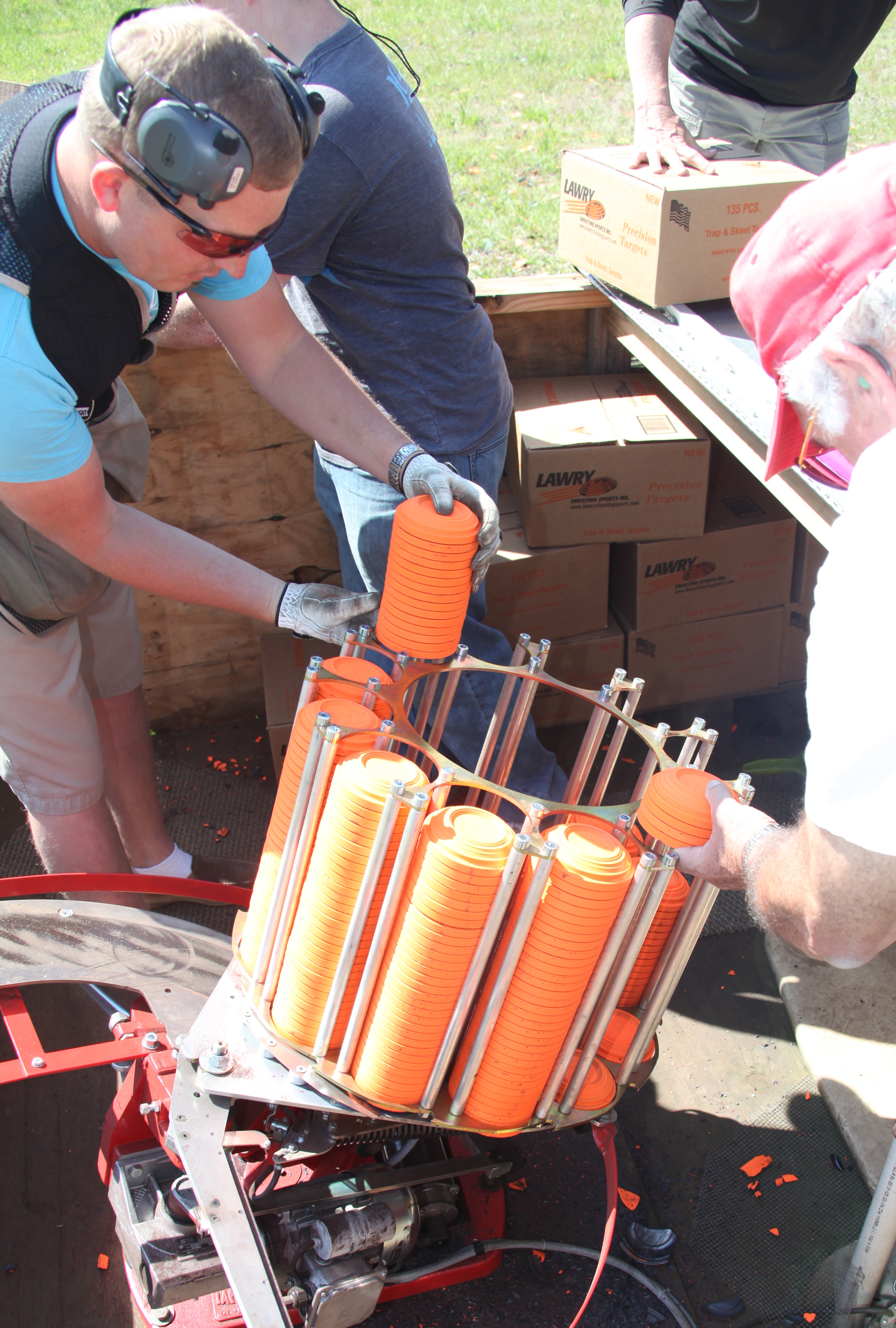
Clay targets being placed in an automatic throwing machine

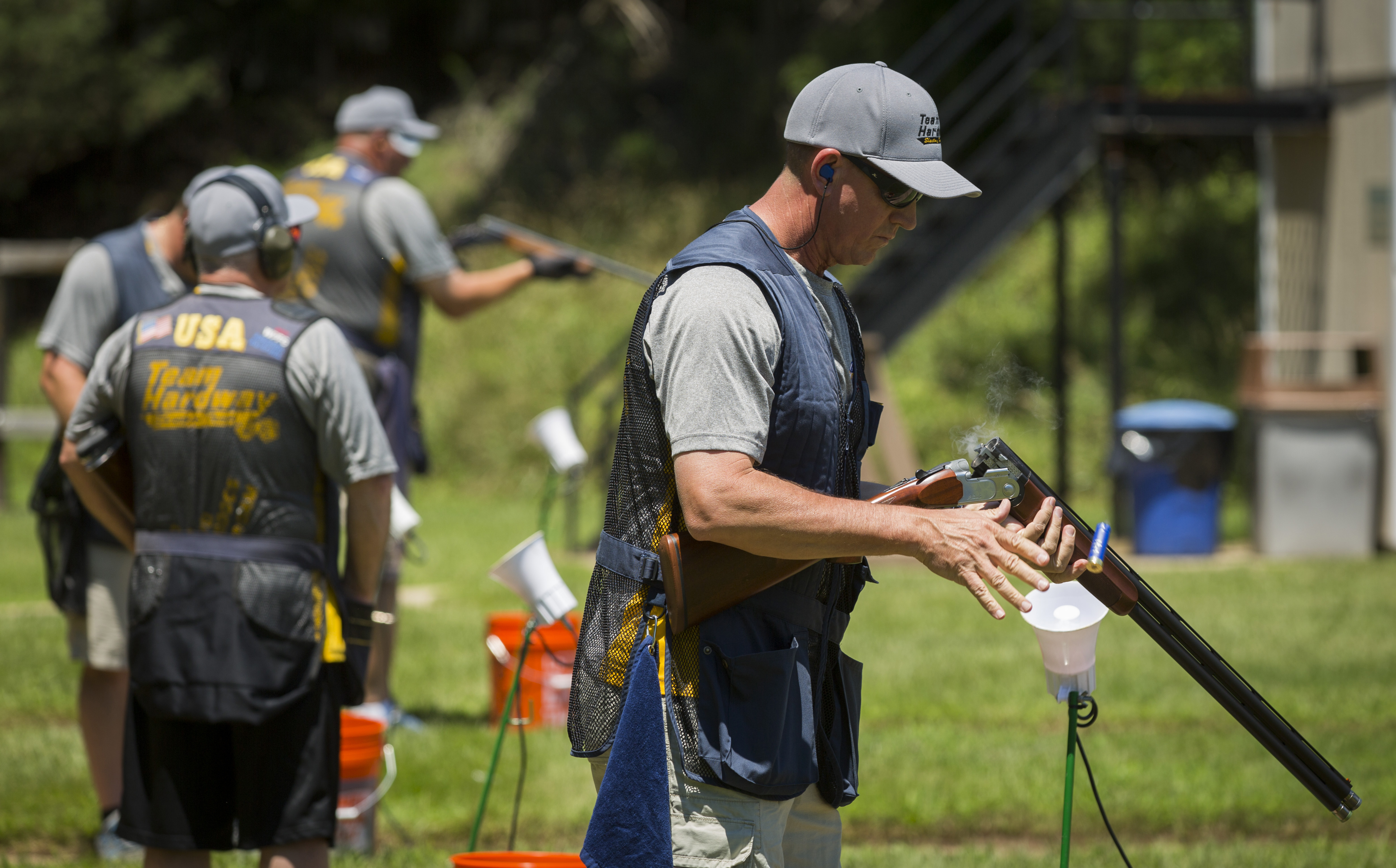
Trap shooting at the 2015 World Police and Fire Games in USA

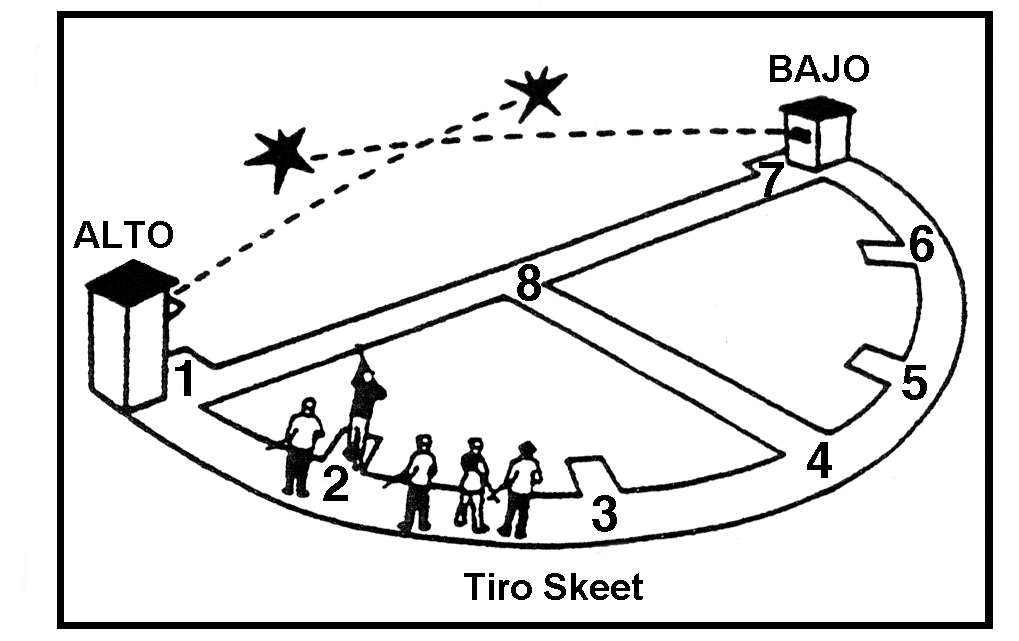
Sketch of a Skeet shooting range

=== Running target ===
Running target shooting refers to a number of disciplines involving a shooting target—sometimes called a boar, moose, or deer—that is made to move as if it is a running animal. Events of this type include:

- ISSF 10 meter running target
- ISSF 10 meter running target mixed
- ISSF 50 meter running target
- ISSF 50 meter running target mixed
- 100 meter running moose, popular in Scandinavia both as a sport and hunting exercise. Competitions in Sweden are held at 80 meters.
- 100 meter running deer, also somewhat popular in Scandinavia and Great Britain

==== Moving target ====
Shooting at the 1908 Summer Olympics – Men's moving target small-bore rifle

==== Disappearing target ====
Shooting at the 1908 Summer Olympics – Men's disappearing target small-bore rifle

=== Practical shooting ===
Practical shooting, also known as action shooting or dynamic shooting, is a generic term applicable to shooting sports where speed is of equal importance as precision. Many of the disciplines involve movement, and when using handguns they are often drawn from a holster.

- The International Practical Shooting Confederation (IPSC) is the oldest and largest sanctioning body within practical shooting. IPSC is sometimes considered the "Formula One" of shooting sports, and is shot with handguns, rifles and shotguns. While the United States Practical Shooting Association (USPSA) is the U.S. regional affiliate of IPSC, many of USPSA's rules differ slightly from those used internationally. IPSC was developed by former police and civilian marksmen and later used as a basis for modern military and police exercises. It is a variation where the shooter often moves during shooting, and hits scored and shooting time are equally important. Stage procedure is generally not dictated (freestyle) and the shooter is allowed to determine the order and manner in which he or she engages the targets.
- International Defensive Pistol Association (IDPA) is an action shooting sport that uses semi-automatic handguns and revolvers with a strong emphasis on concealed shooting. Many aspects of stage engagement are dictated to competitors and penalties are given to competitors whom the safety officer determines attempted to gain a competitive advantage or engaged in a forbidden action with a "guilty mind" - that he knowingly failed to do right.
- Multigun are practical shooting events where each of the stages generally require the competitor to use and transition between a combination of rifles, handguns, and/ or shotguns or other types of firearms. 3-Gun has a lot in common with ordinary IPSC/USPSA matches, having courses of fire where the shooter must move through different stages and engage targets in a variety of different positions.
- Steel Challenge is a speed shooting championship solely about shooting steel targets as fast as possible, and is governed by the Steel Challenge Shooting Association (SCSA). There are eight standardized courses of fire, and a special "stop plate" must be shot last to stop the timer.
- International Confederation of Revolver Enthusiasts (ICORE) is an international community that promotes action shooting competitions with revolvers. Founded in 1991, the sport has elements from the Bianchi Cup, IPSC, and the Steel Challenge.
- IPSC Action Air follows the same principle of IPSC, using airsoft instead of real firearms. The ranges, paper targets and poppers are scaled down to suit airsoft, and the sport enjoys popularity in countries such as Taiwan, Hong Kong, and Japan where civilian ownership of real firearms are either illegal or extremely difficult to obtain.
- Bowling pin shooting (primarily shot with handguns) has the competitors race against one another to knock standard bowling pins from a table in the shortest elapsed time.
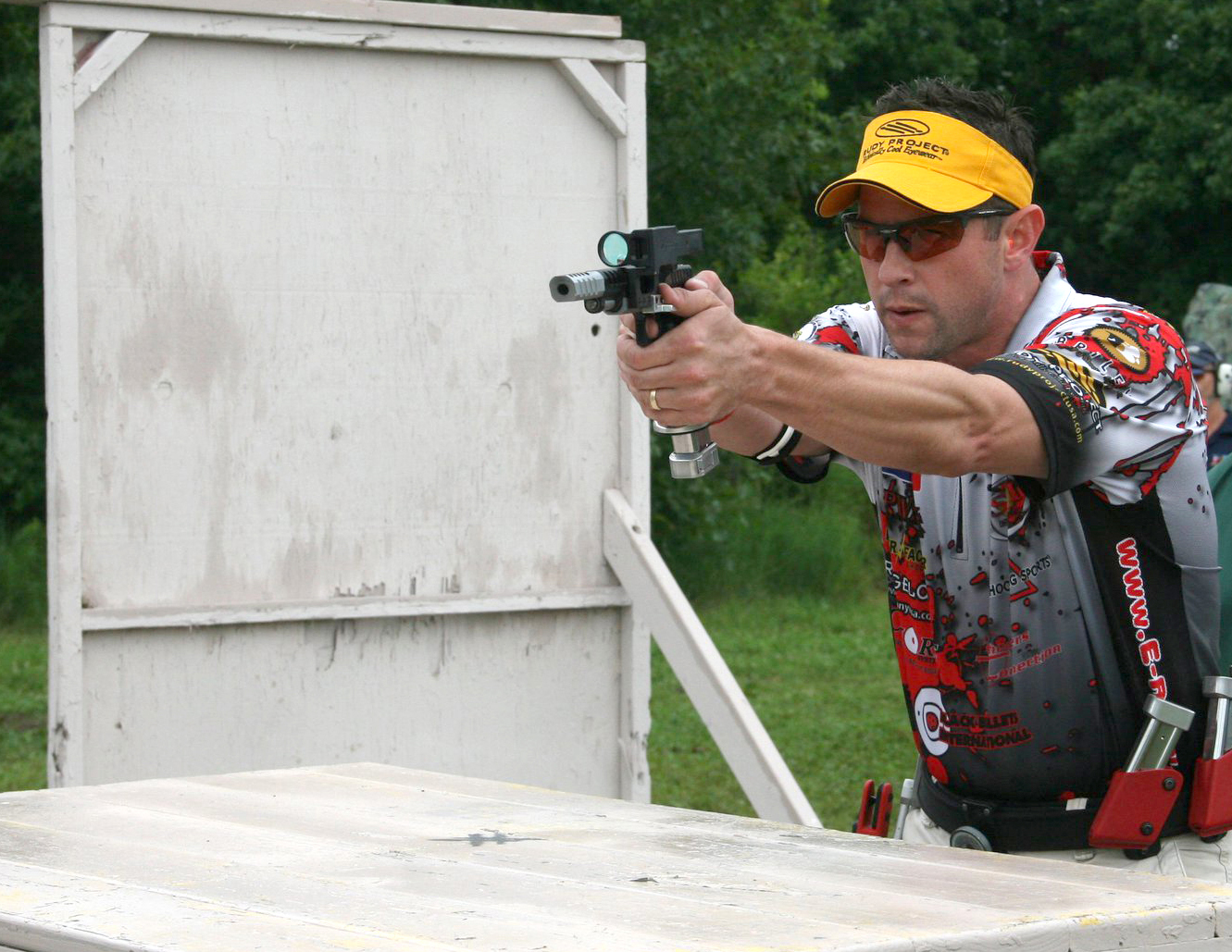
An Open division practical pistol shooter during a stage

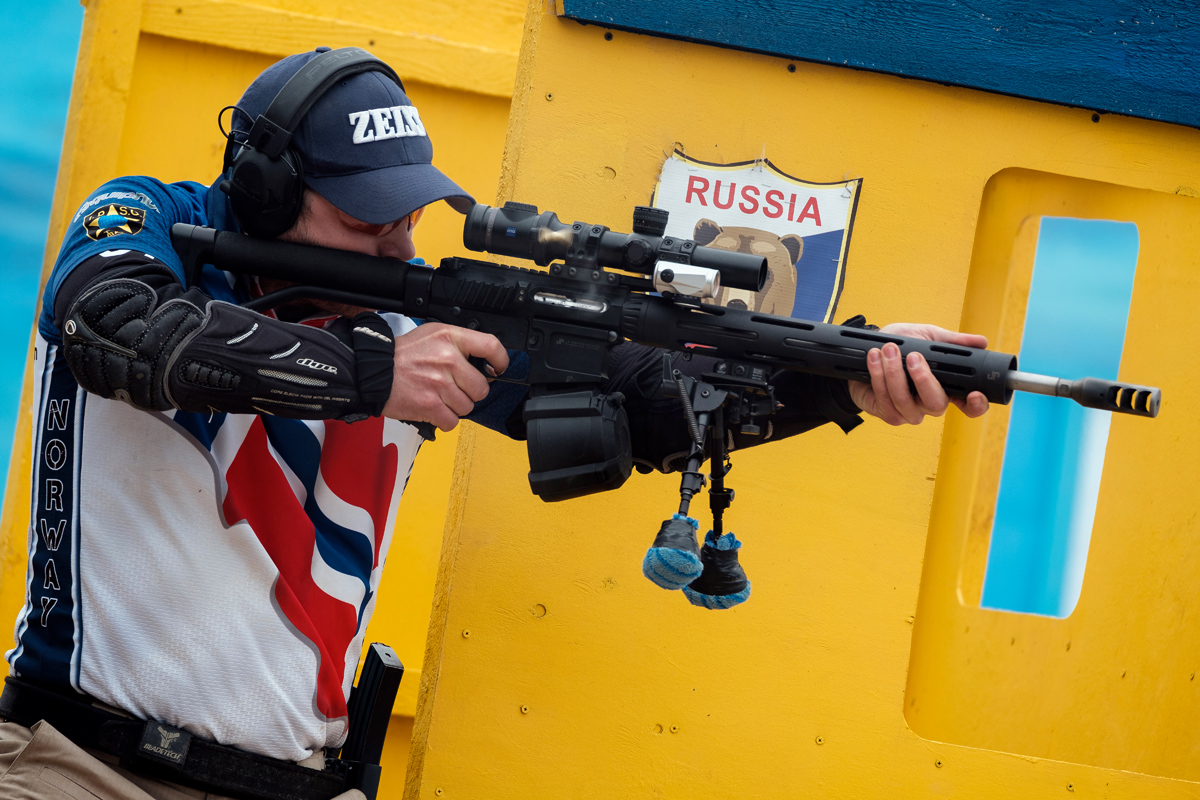
A Norwegian practical rifle shooter at the 2017 IPSC Rifle World Shoot in Russia

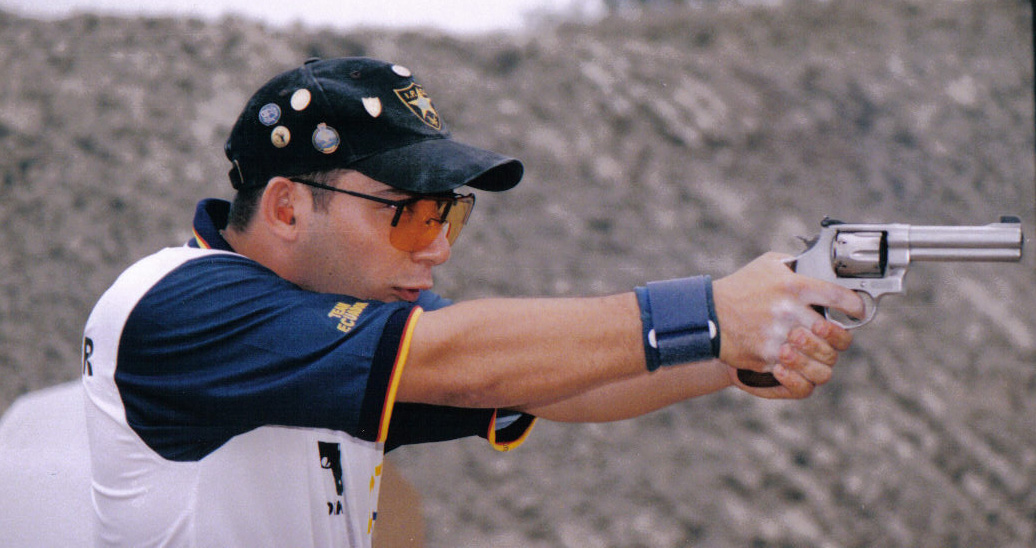
Three times practical revolver world champion Ricardo López Tugendhat from Ecuador

=== Long range ===
Long range shooting is shooting held at such distances that sight adjustment based from judging atmospherical conditions become critical.

- Fullbore target shooting is concerned with shooting at targets at ranges of 300–1200 yards. The sport is internationally governed by ICFRA, and is popular in the UK, US, Germany and Commonwealth countries. Similar disciplines called bullseye and field shooting are popular in Scandinavia, although fired at shorter distances.
  - "Target Rifle" (also known as Palma rifle) is an ICFRA fullbore competition format that dates from 1876, featuring long-range rifle shooting out to 1,000 yards. The first Palma match was contested by teams from the U.S., Australia, Canada, Scotland and Ireland (with muzzle loaded rifles at that time). The matches continued to the late 1920s, and the Palma trophy was eventually lost in Washington DC around the outbreak of WW2. The match was revived in the modern era in 1966 in Canada, and continues between teams from around the world. Regulations stipulate bolt-action rifles chambered in 7.62mm NATO caliber (Winchester .308) and firing Match Grade ammunition using a 155 grain bullet using micrometer aperture (iron) sights, or a 5.56mm NATO (.223 Remington) with a max bullet weight of 90 grains, and iron sights. Due to developments in modern bullet technology, an 85.5 grain bullet out of a .223 can out shoot a .308, with the right load. The last two International Long-range Target Rifle Matches were held in Australia in 2011 and the U.S. in 2015, were won by Great Britain.
  - F-Class is another ICFRA fullbore competition format shot with Fullbore Target Rifles at ranges up to 1000 yards, the rifles being fitted with telescopic sights and the use of fore-end and butt rests being permitted. This is a fast-growing variant of Fullbore Target Rifle. The 'F' honours George Farquharson, the Canadian inventor of F-Class.
- Precision Rifle Competitions, a relatively new long range competition format which seeks to find a balance between speed and precision, often involving movement and shooting from unusual positions with a time limit, at both known and unknown distances.
  - National Rifle League (NRL) is a 501(c)(3) non-profit organization dedicated to the growth and education of precision rifle shooting in the United States. Their match format allows any caliber between .224 to .308 and not to exceed 3,200 feet per second (980 m/s), involving at least 50 shooters with each firing minimum 140 rounds in at least 12 individual stages, over the course of at least two days. Since its debut in 2017, currently 11 clubs from eight states are involved in the league.
  - National Rifle League 22 (NRL22) is a sub-league under the National Rifle League dedicated to .22 Long Rifle rimfire rifles. It was established to address the fact that most localities do not have access to 1000 yard ranges, but nearly all localities have 100-yard ranges and most shooters own .22 rifles. Their championship match consist of minimum 170 rounds fired in at least 15 individual stages. Currently 68 clubs from 31 states in the US participate in NRL22 matches, with addition to two overseas clubs from UK and Australia.
- T-Class Shooting Sport Competitions. Practical sniping with precision rifle systems is a shooting sport, which gains tremendous popularity worldwide over a short period of time. It concentrates on shooting onto static or dynamic targets of various distances (known and unknown), from different positions, under artificially created, but realistic stressful circumstances. It proves to be extremely interesting both for implementation and observation, due to its demanding level of difficulty. The International T-Class Confederation (ITCC) is a non-profit organization, which is founded in 2014 for the purpose of promotion of the T-Class shooting sport internationally, with headquarters residing in Bulgaria. It offers a Set of Rules for designing and managing T-Class Competitions.
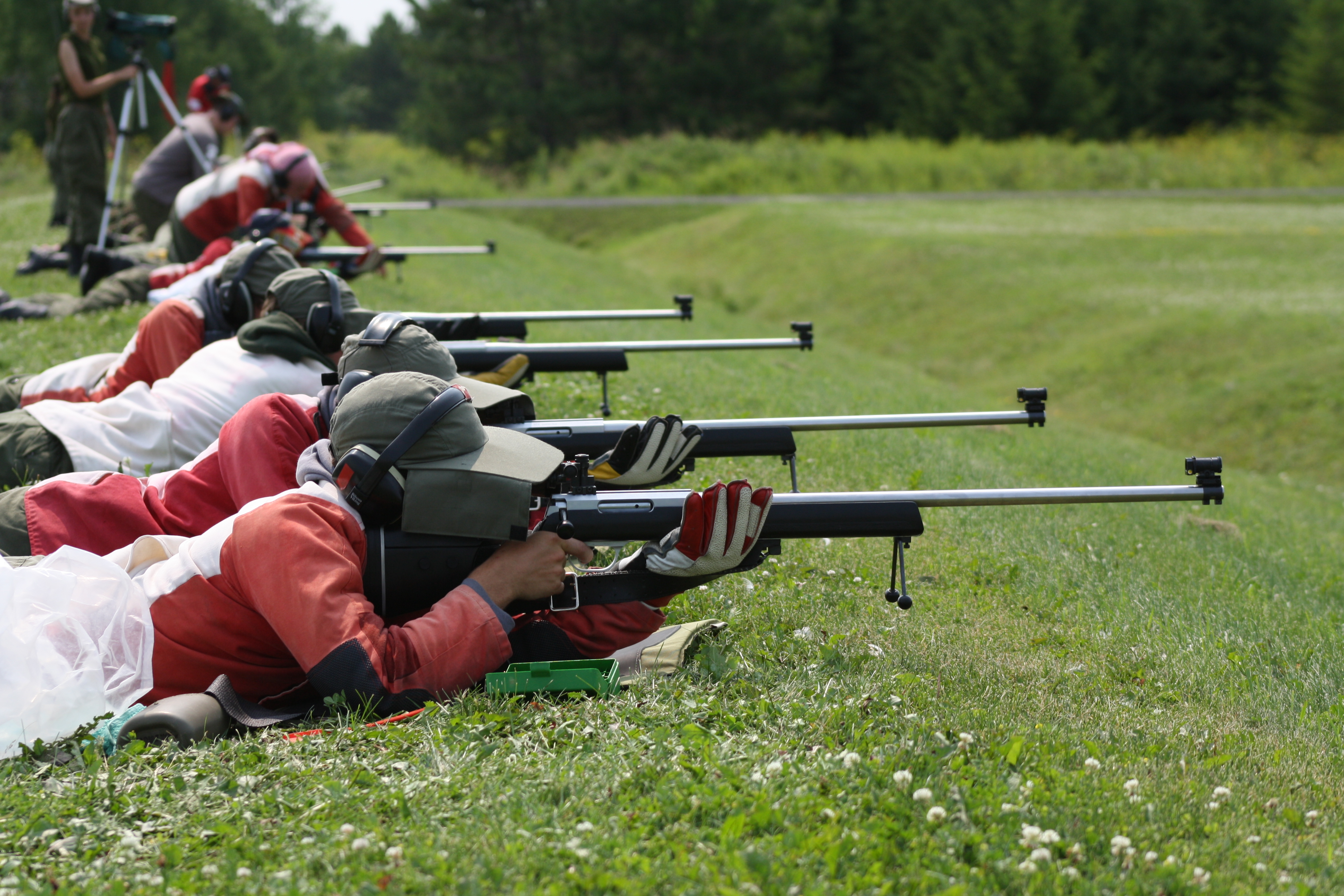
Fullbore target rifle ("Palma") shooting in Canada in 2011

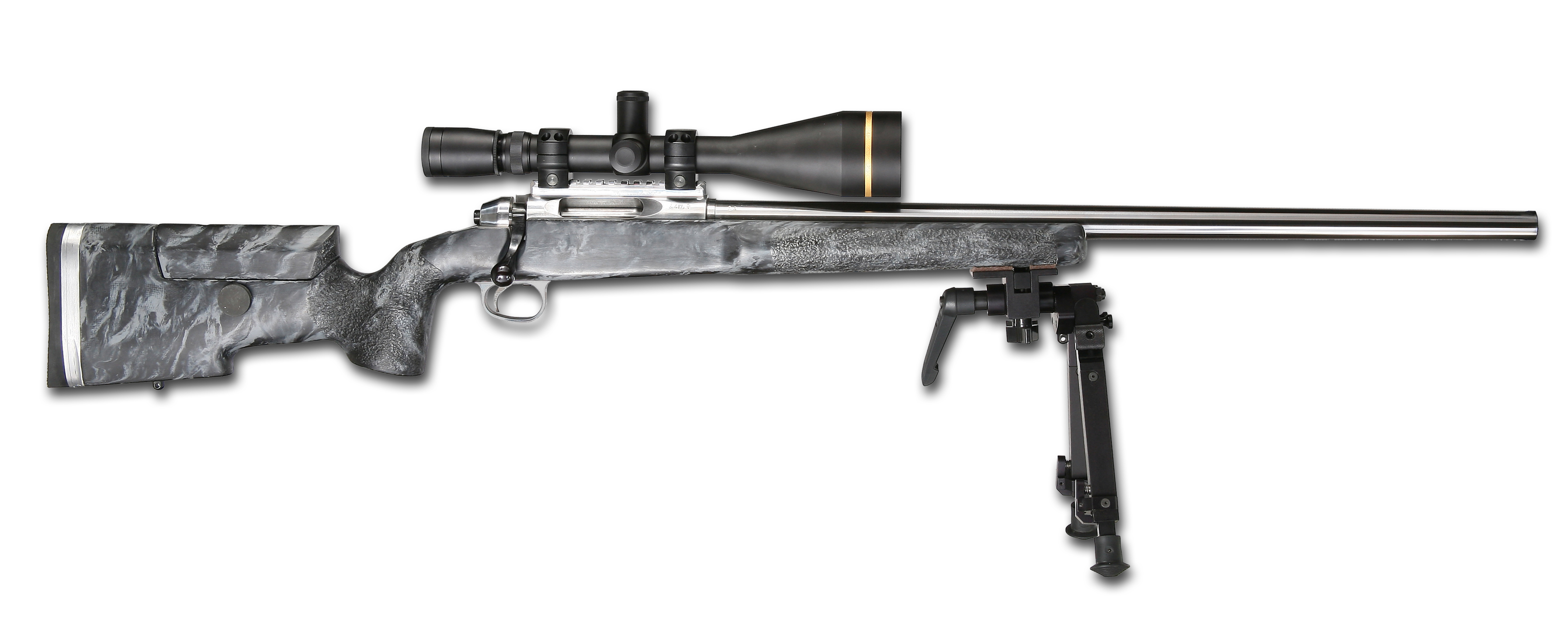
An ICFRA F-Class rifle equipped with a scope and bipod

=== Benchrest ===
Benchrest shooting is concerned with shooting small groups with the rifleman sitting on a chair (bench) and the rifle supported from a table. Of all shooting disciplines, this is the most demanding equipment-wise. Depending on equipment class, international benchrest competitions are governed by either the World Benchrest Shooting Federation or World Rimfire and Air Rifle Benchrest Federation.

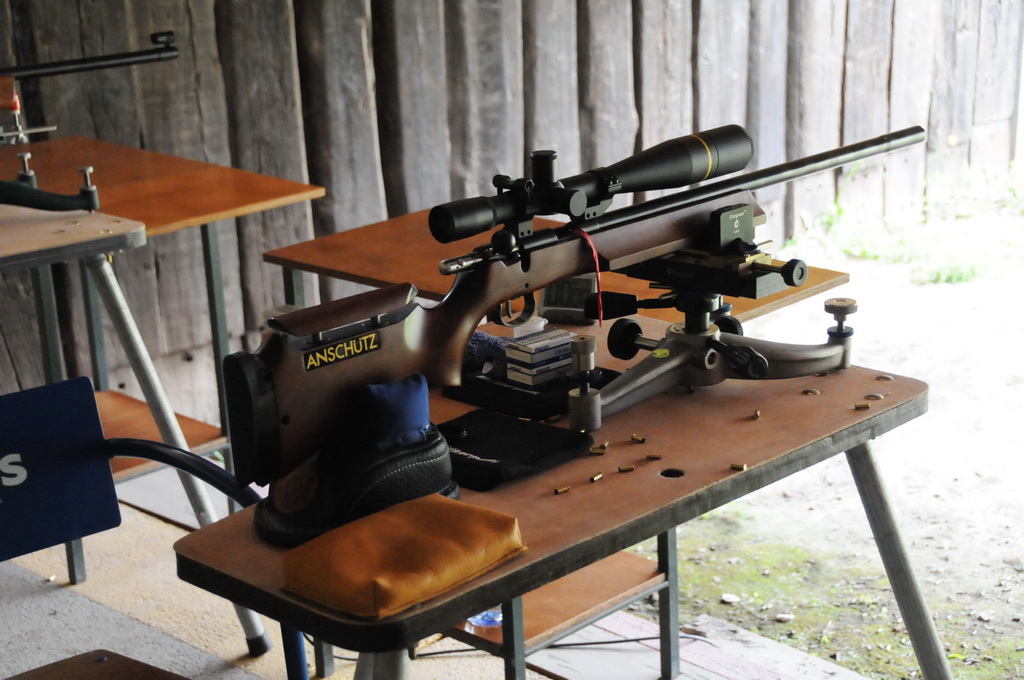
An Anschütz 1903 rifle in caliber .22 LR used for benchrest shooting at 50 meters

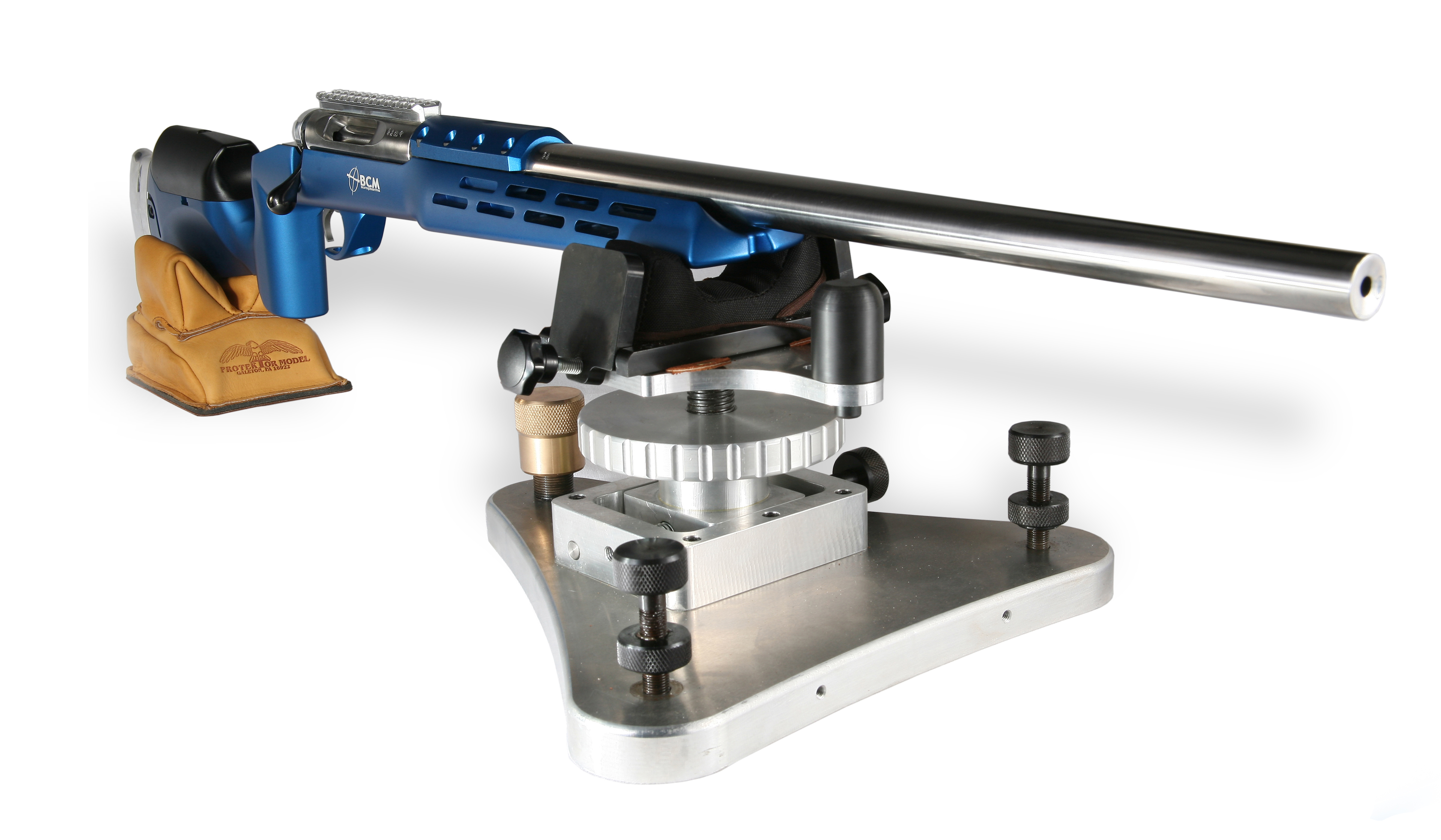
A BCM Europearms single shot benchrest rifle

=== Metallic silhouette ===
Metallic silhouette competitors shoot at animal-shaped steel silhouettes (chickens, pigs, turkeys and rams) that must be knocked down to score. Banks of 5 targets are placed at up to 500 meters, with distance and size of target determined by firearm class. Classes include Handguns, Small Bore Rifle (Hunter, Silhouette), High Power Rifle (Hunter, Silhouette), air rifle and black powder rifle. Handguns used in the Unlimited Categories are rifle-like in appearance; Thompson Contender, Remington XP-100, and other pistols are chambered in rifle calibers with the power, aerodynamic efficiency, and external ballistics required for precise shooting at 200 meters. There are silhouette categories appropriate for virtually all types of adjustable sight pistols and rifles, only excluding high-velocity armor-piercing rounds that would damage targets. Targets for open sighted guns are placed between 25 and 200 meters, and are designed to provide a usable size of the hit zone of about 1.5 milliradians (or 5 minutes of arc).

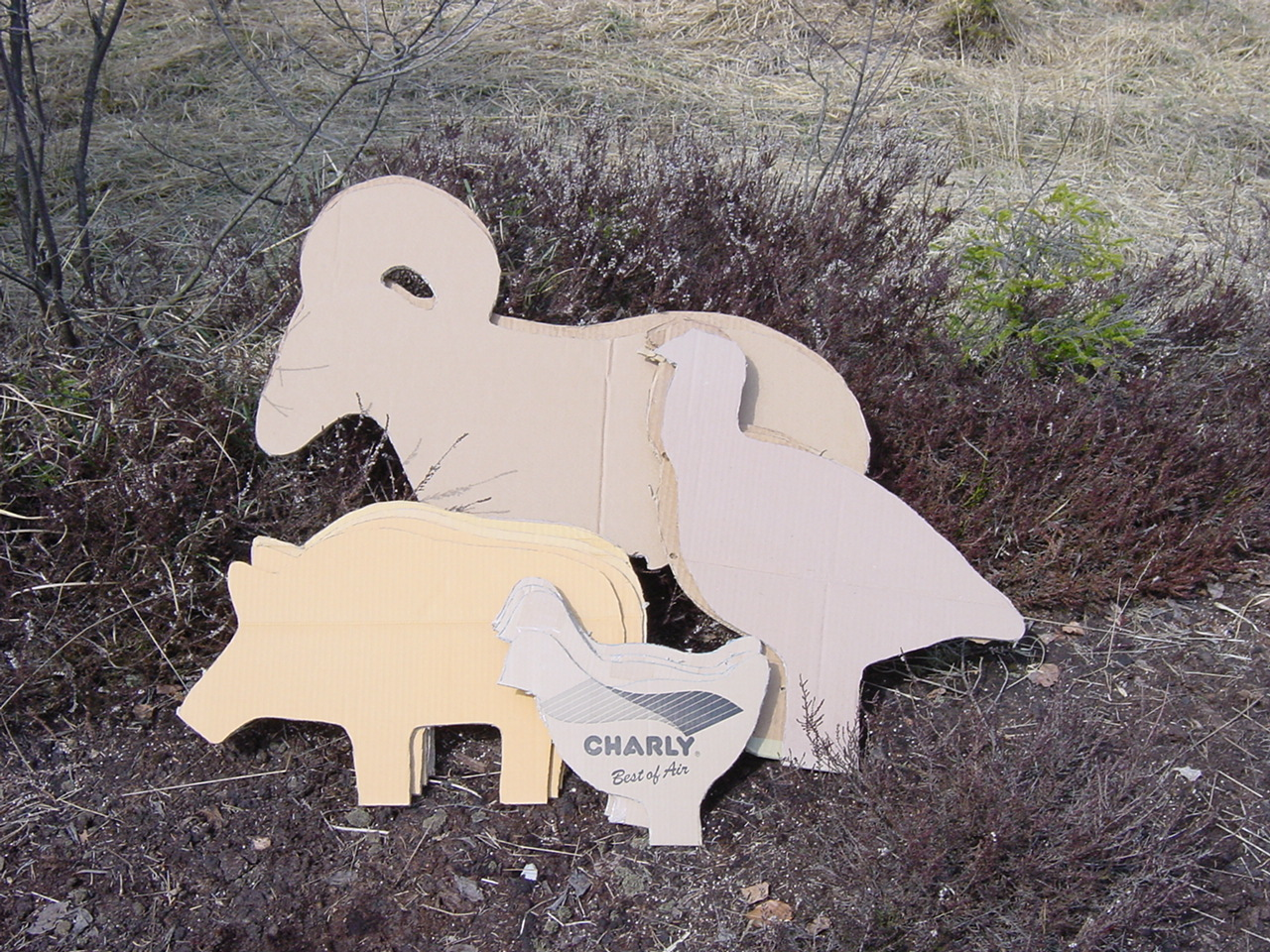
Cut cardboard targets of the same shape and sizes which are used for IHMSA metal targets in metallic silhouette shooting

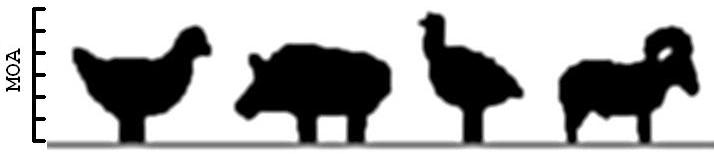
Chicken, pig, turkey, and ram. The different targets are placed at different distances, and in this image the targets are scaled to how they would appear to the shooter in angular sizes (mil or moa).

=== Western ===
- Cowboy action shooting (CAS) is almost identical to USPSA and IDPA stage design but with Western cowboy-themed props. Competitors shoot with historical long guns and revolvers, and are required to use a themed alias and authentic dress.
- Cowboy mounted shooting, also called Western Mounted Shooting or simply Mounted Shooting, is a competitive equestrian sport involving the riding of a horse to negotiate a shooting pattern. Rule sets vary between shooting sport organizations, it can be based on the historical reenactment of historic shooting events held at Wild West shows in the late 19th century. Modern events use blank ammunition instead of live rounds, certified to break a target balloon within twenty feet.
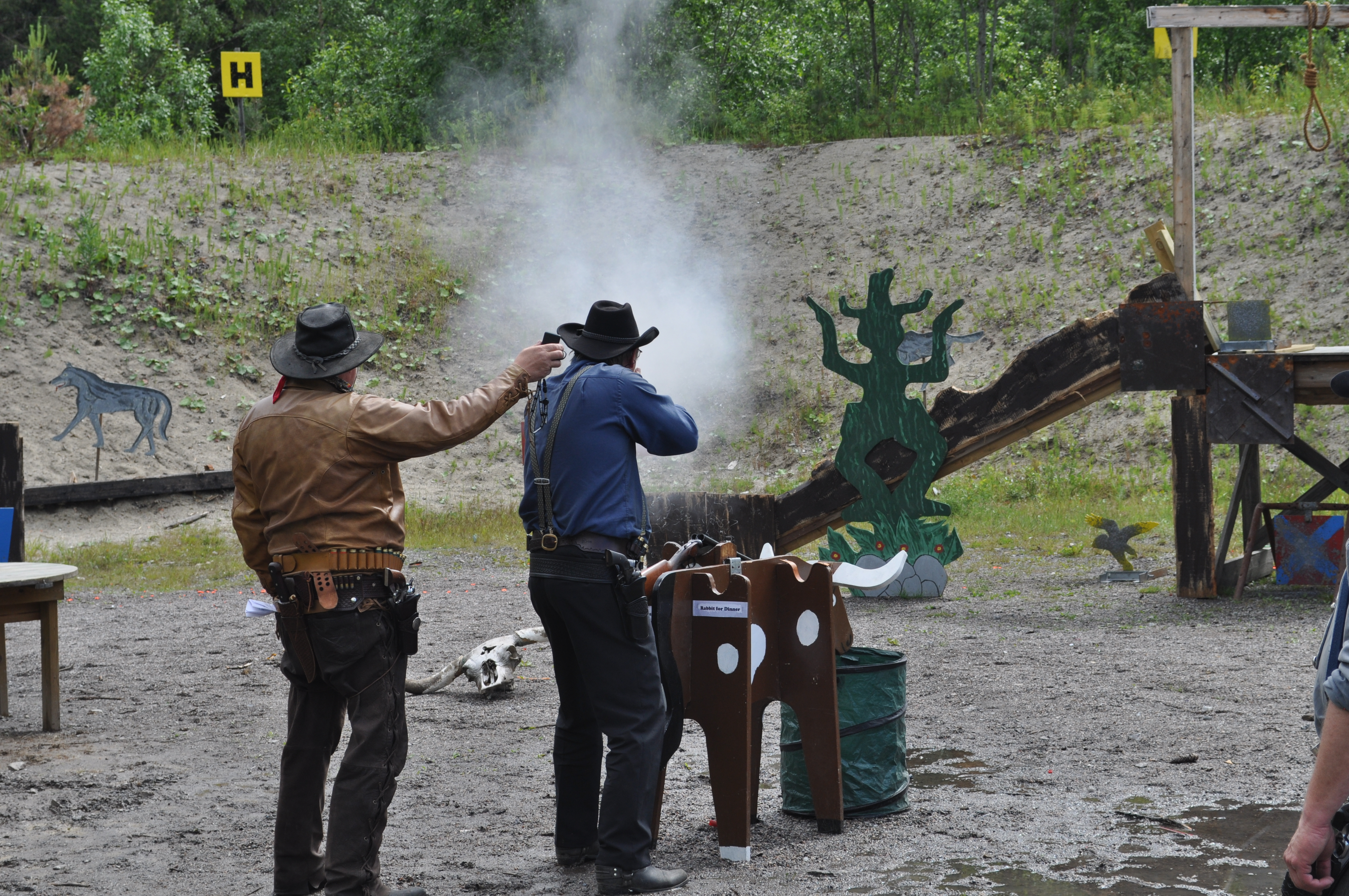
A Cowboy action shooter firing a lever action rifle at steel targets. The Range Officer to the left is holding a shooting timer to measure the time.

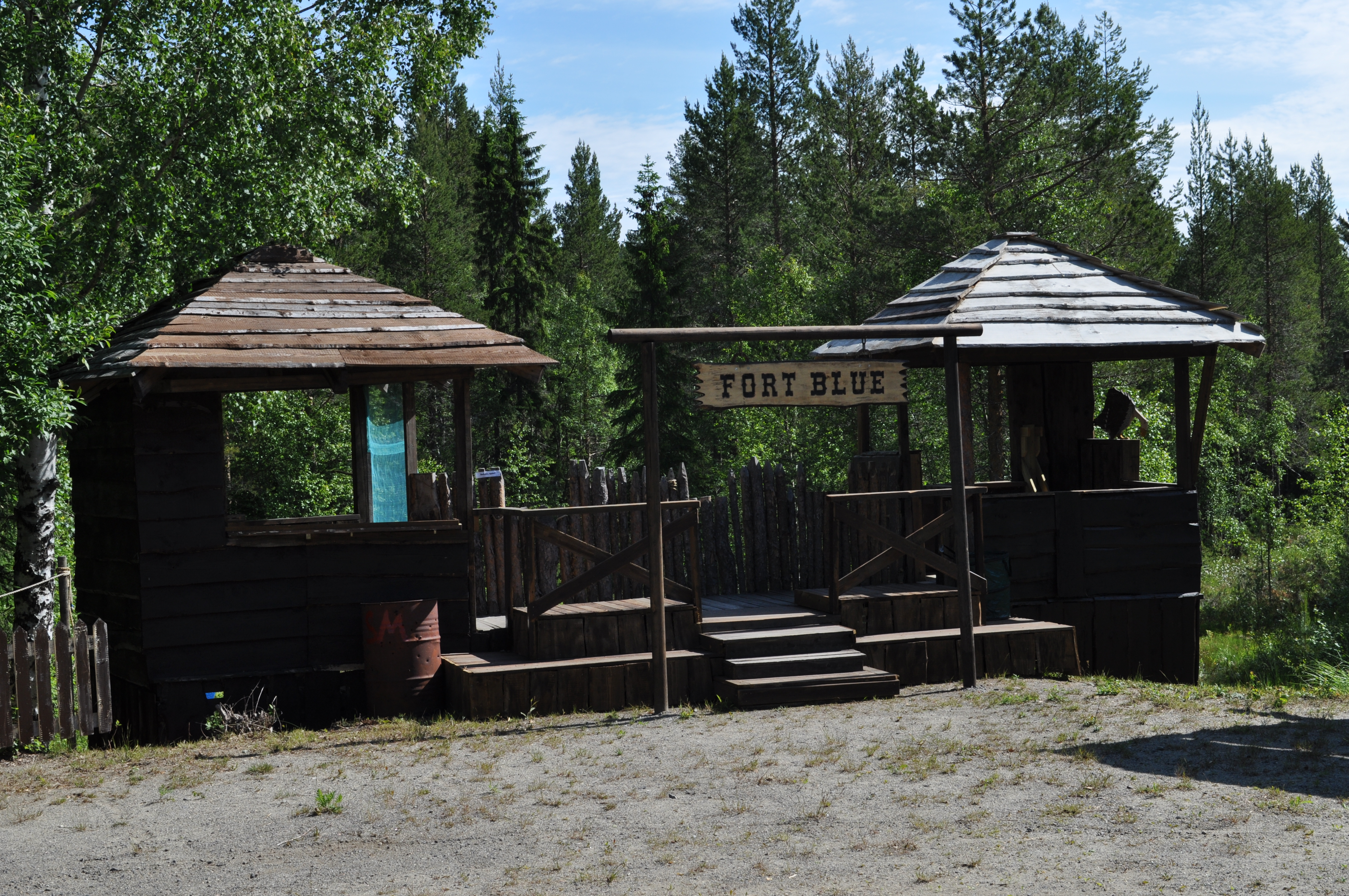
Scenery in a Western scenario

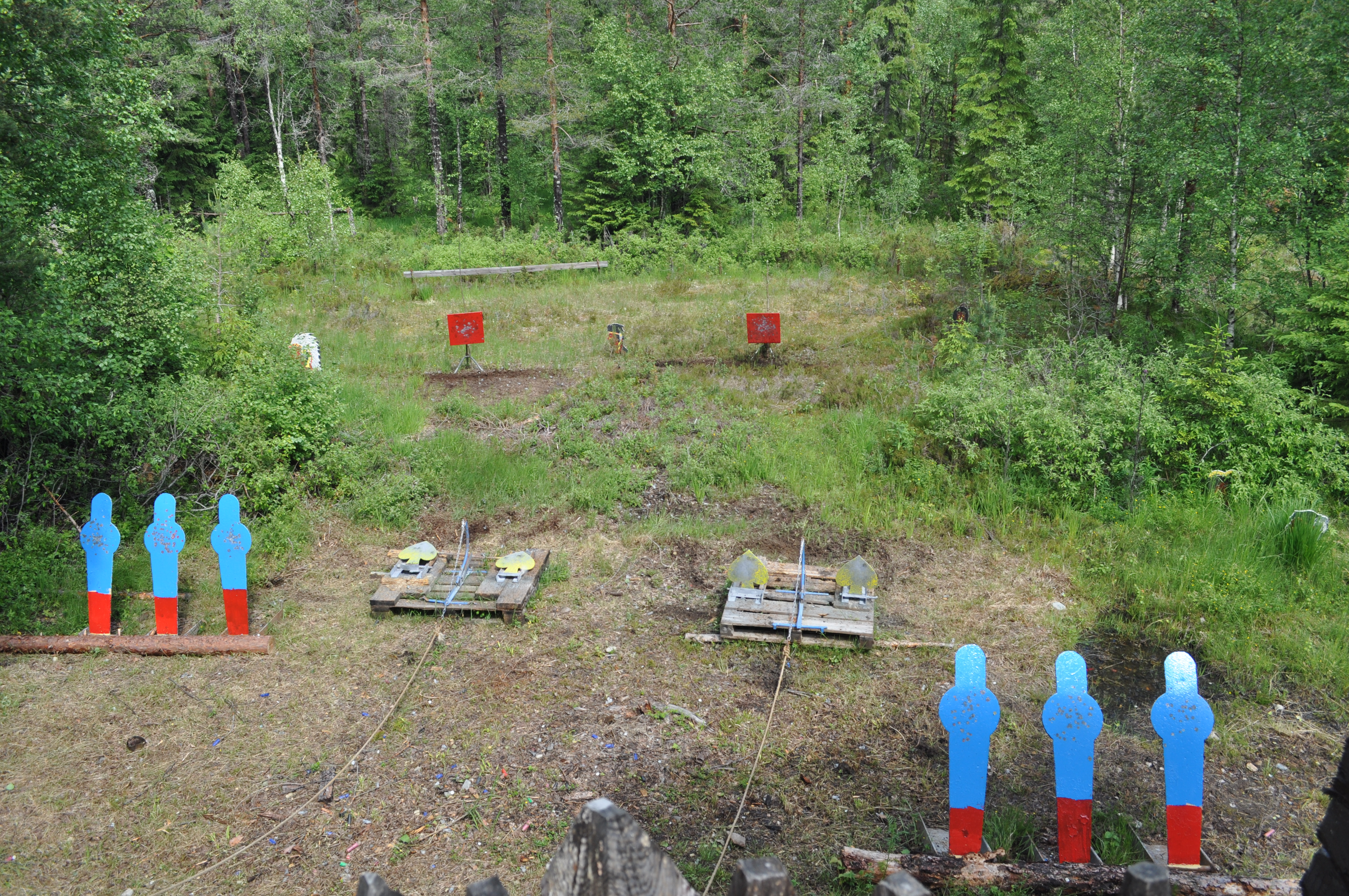
The shooter uses different firearms during a stage. In this stage revolvers were used at the close range blue targets and a lever action at the red targets furthest away.

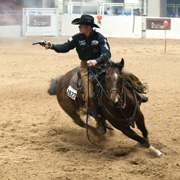
Cowboy mounted shooting at the 2012 AQHA Mounted Shooting World Championship

=== Muzzleloading ===
Muzzleloading are concerned with shooting replica (or antique) guns.

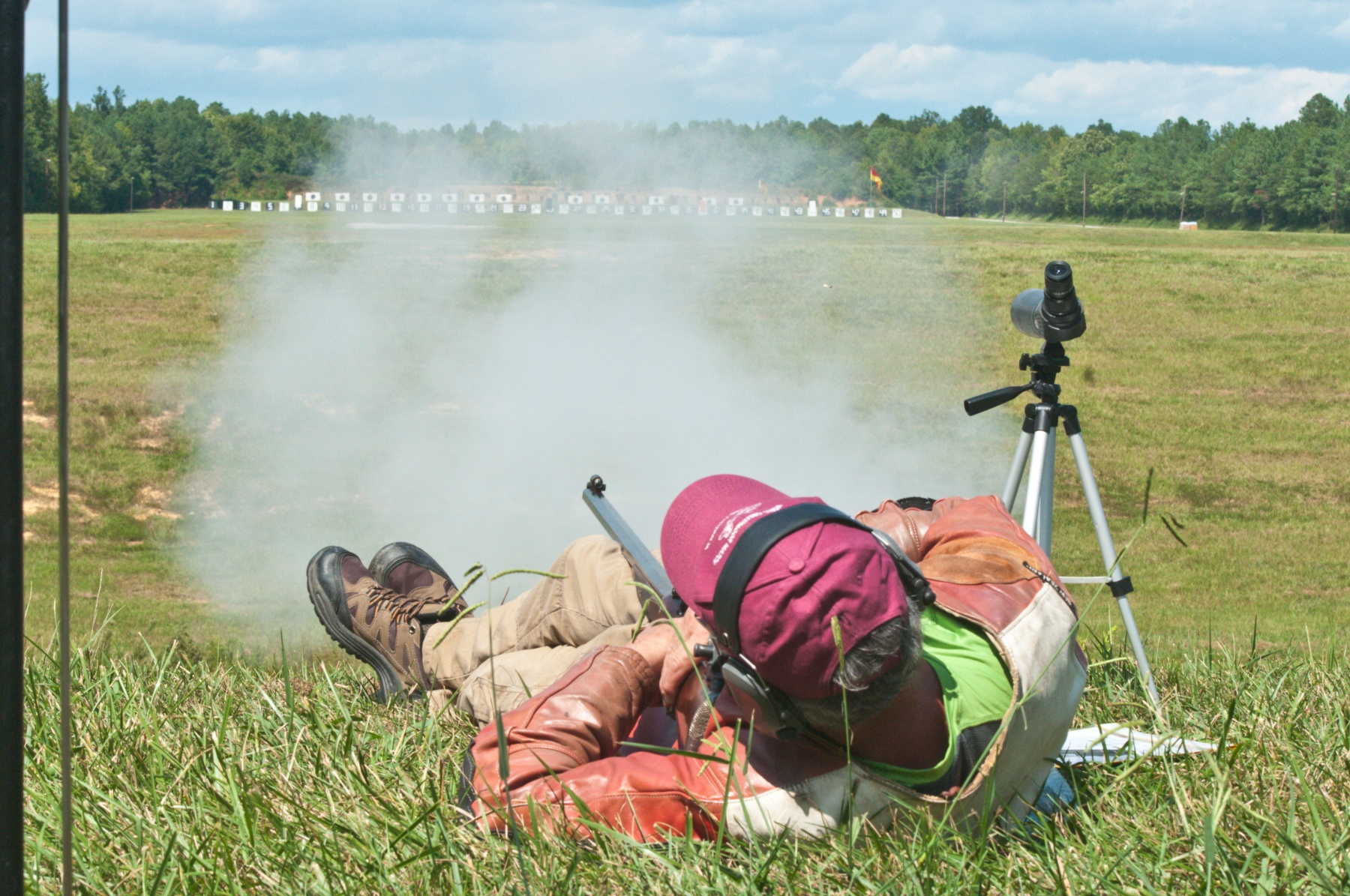
Competitor shooting at 1000 yards (914.4 meters) laying on back

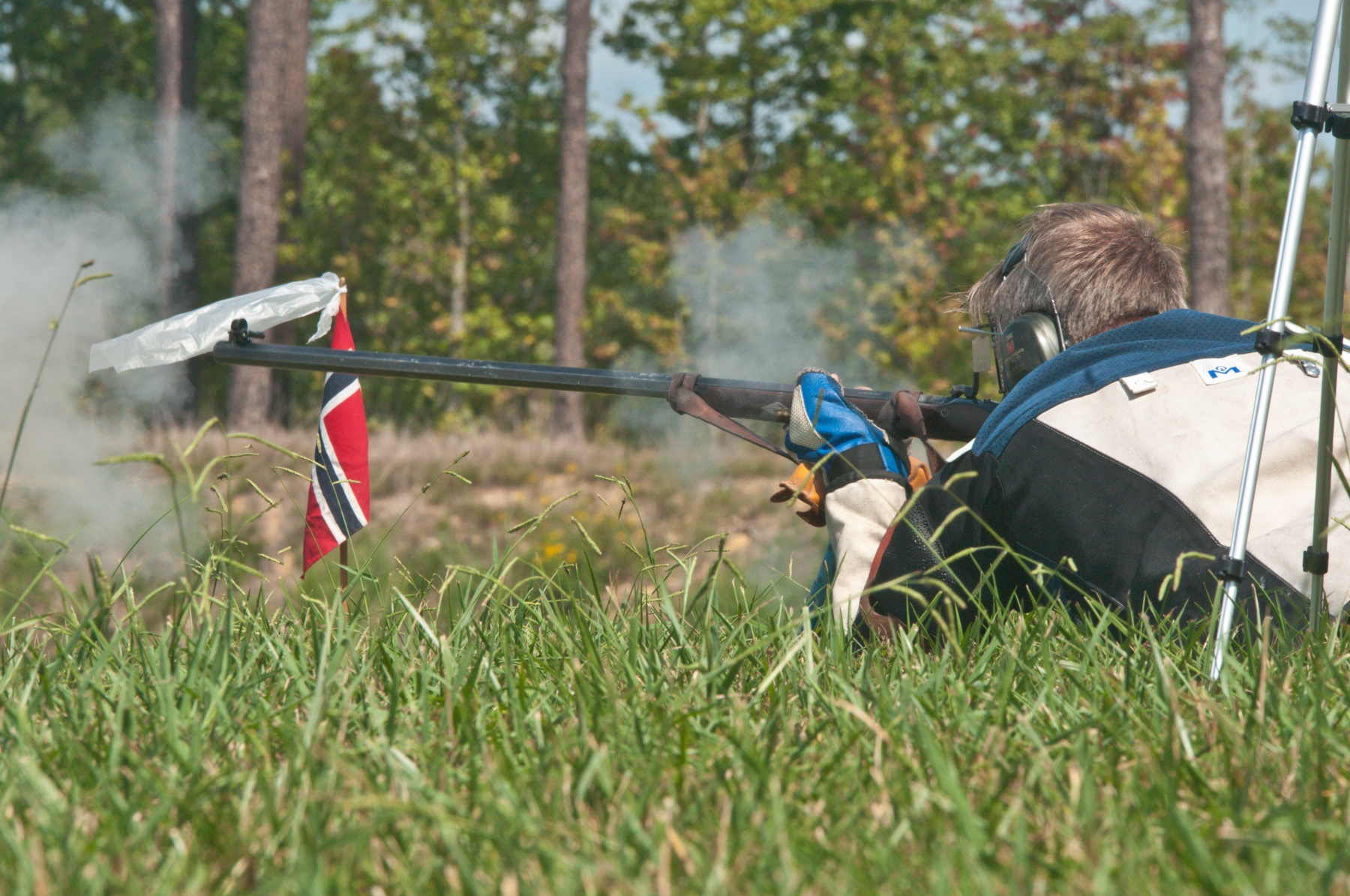
Competitor from Team Norway shooting at 1000 yards (914.4 meters)

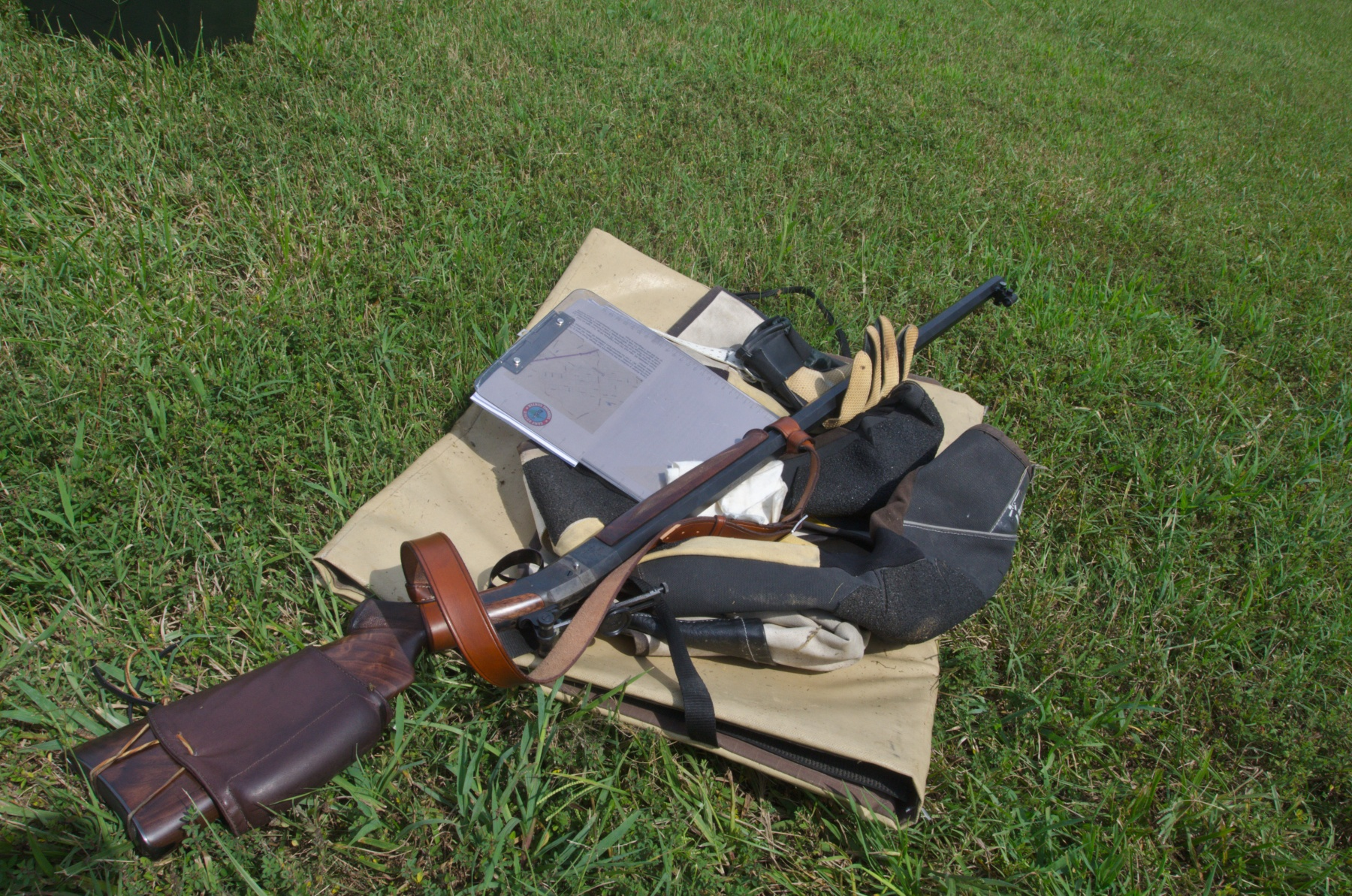
Replica Rigby rifle used at the 2015 MLAIC Muzzleloading Long Range Championship

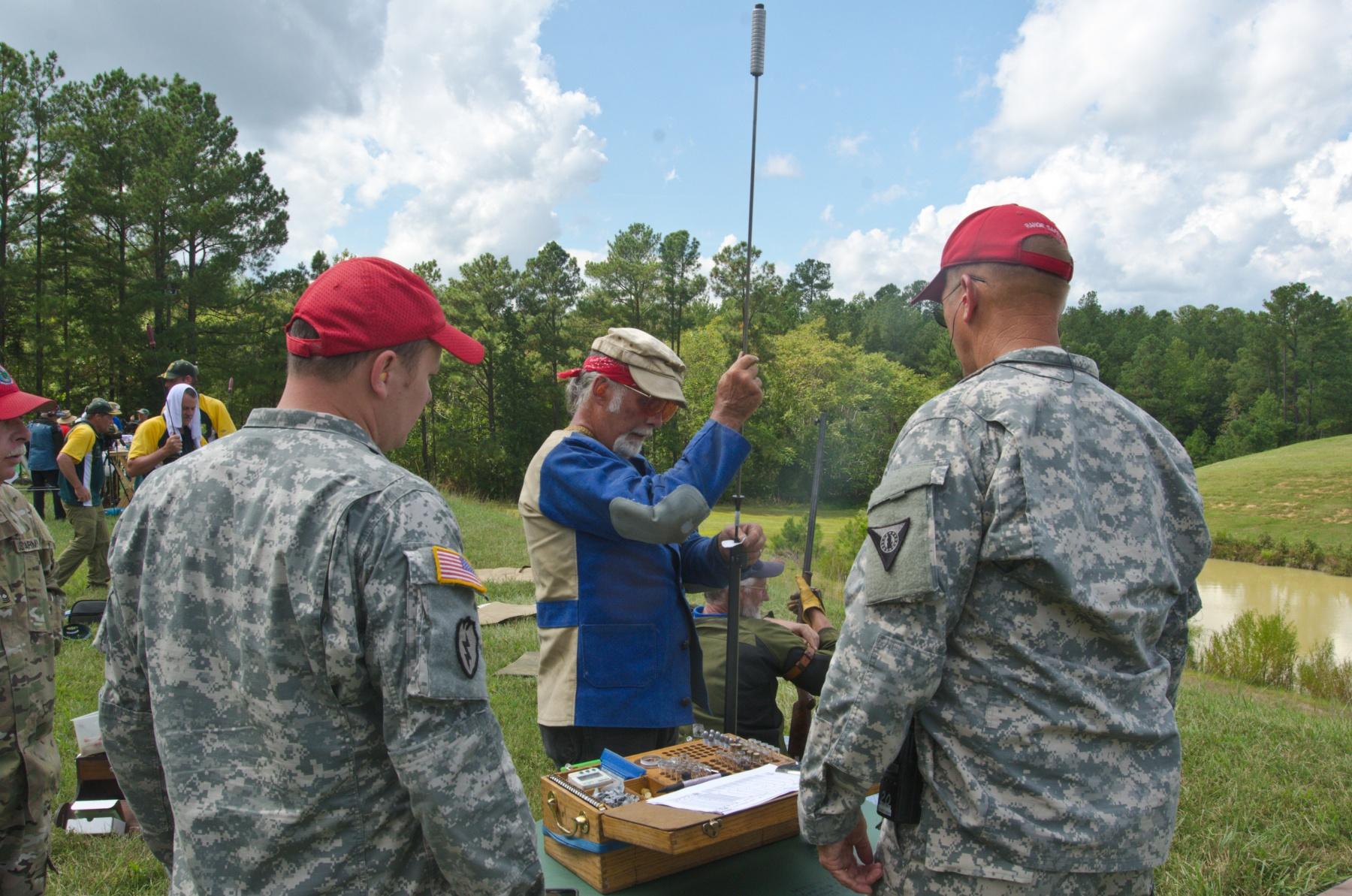
A member of Team USA loading his blackpowder rifle

=== Para shooting ===
Paralympic shooting, also known as "shooting Para sport", is an adaptation of shooting sports for competitors with disabilities. Paralympic shooting first appeared in the Summer Paralympics at the 1976 Toronto Games. Para shooting is internationally governed by the International Paralympic Committee. To help establish fair competition, a shooting classification called Para-shooting classification is in place for the Paralympic Games.

The events mirror to some extent the shooting events at the Olympic Games. Air Pistol is typically shot from a seated position with the pistol unsupported. The amount of back-support permitted is determined by the athlete's level of disability. The Air Rifle events include Rifle "Standing", which is shot seated like Air Pistol, with variable levels of back support. "Prone" Rifle uses the basic prone shooting position utilising a sling for the supporting arm, but is shot rested on a table with the athlete seated either in a chair or wheelchair.

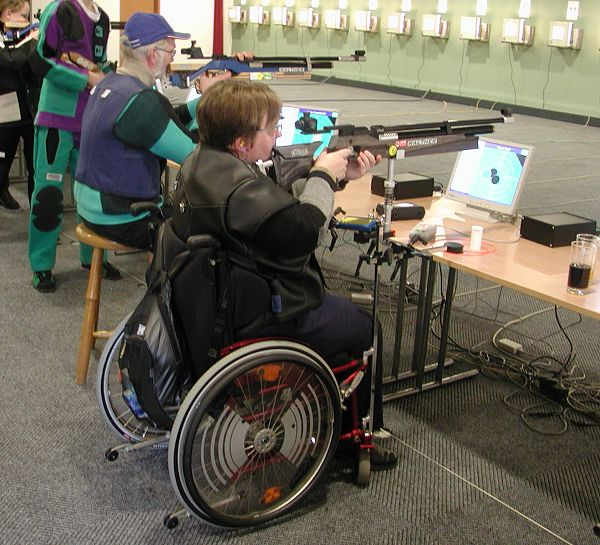
Para shooting with a rifle sitting in a wheelchair

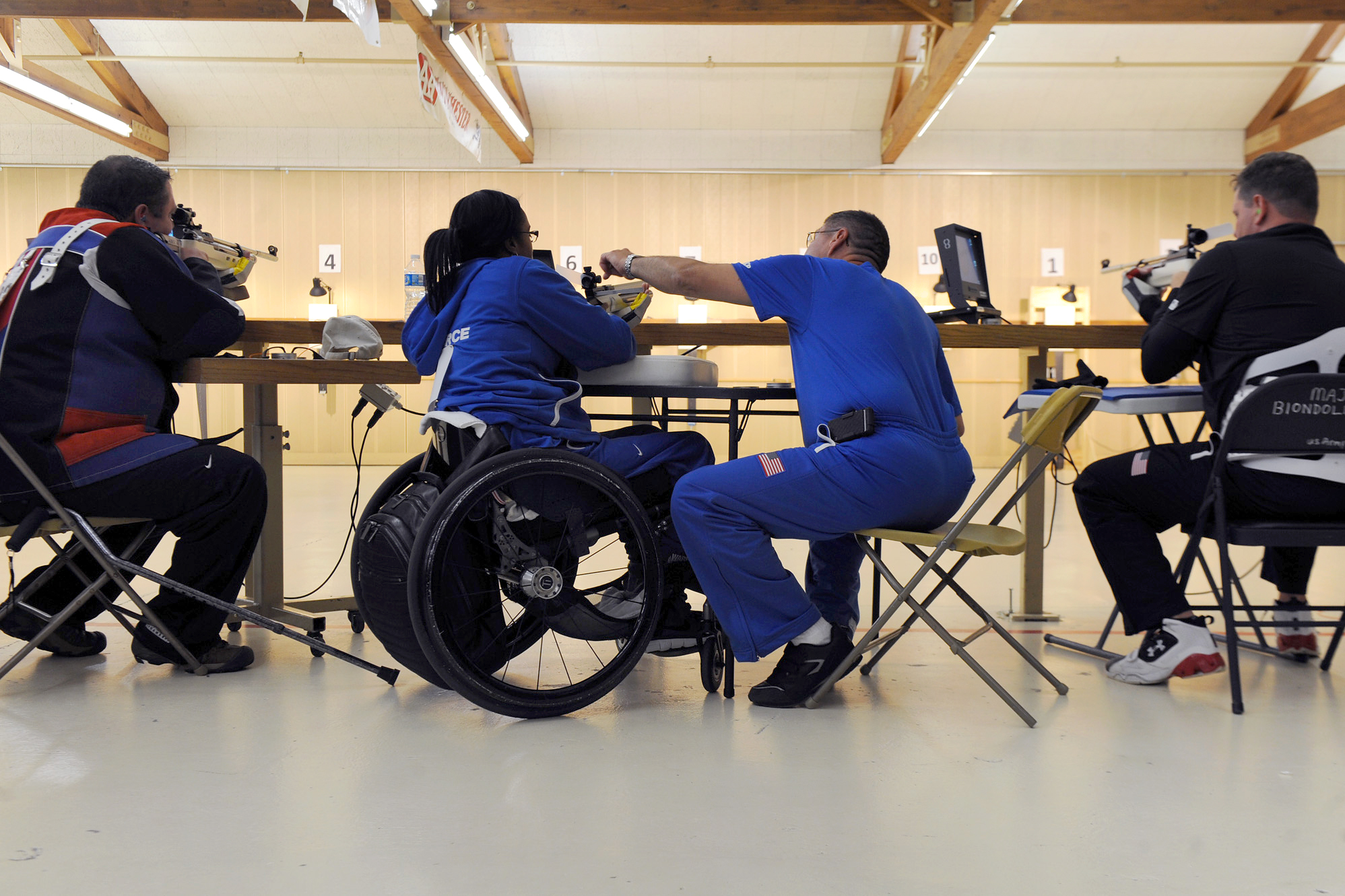

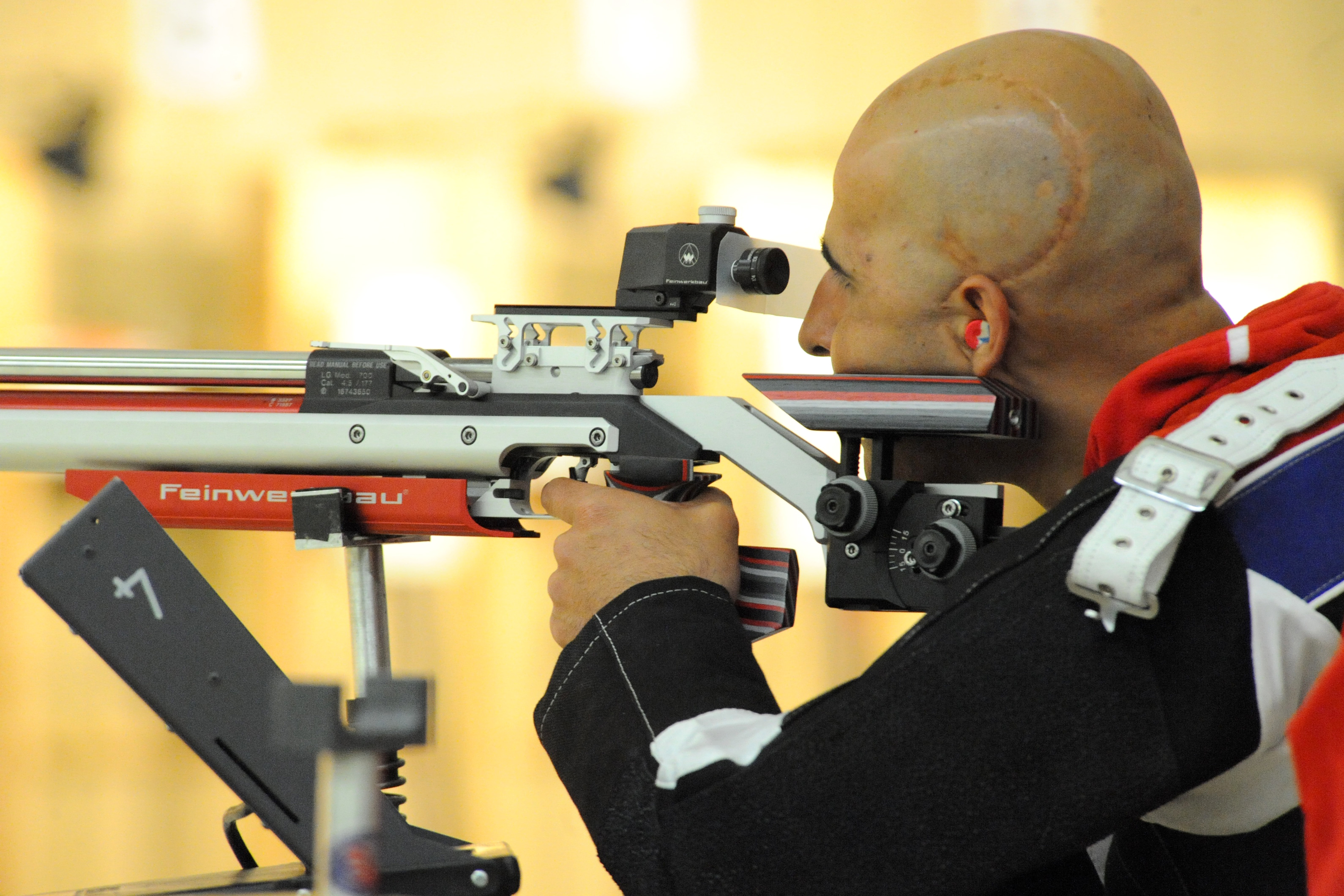

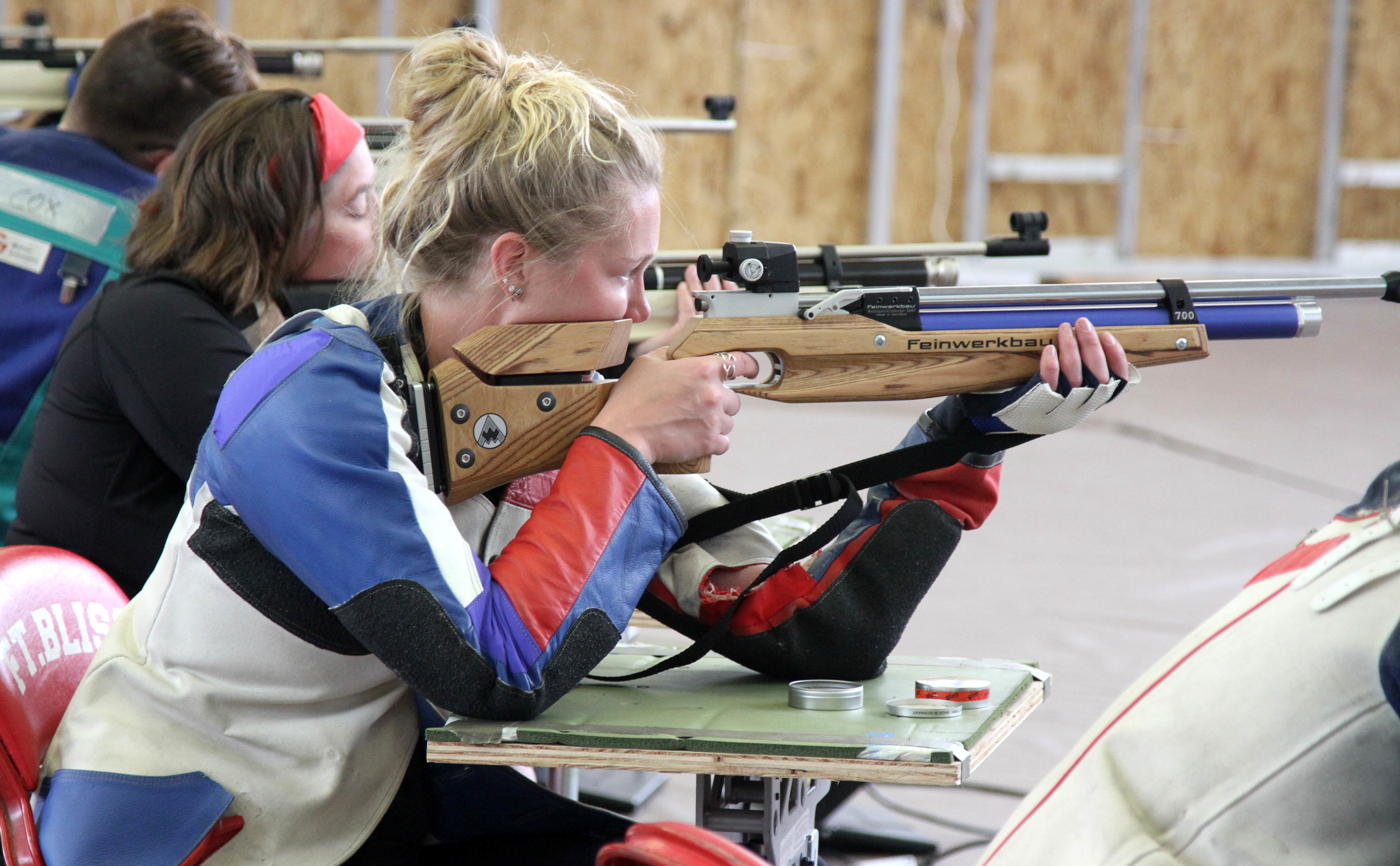
Para "Prone" modifies the basic prone shooting position to be shot from a table.

=== Competitions using factory and service firearms ===
Shooting competitions for factory and service firearms, usually called Service Rifle, Service Pistol, Production, Factory or Stock, describe a set of disciplines or equipment classes where the types of permitted firearms are subject to type approval and few aftermarket modifications are permitted. Thus the terms refer to permitted equipment and modifications rather than the type of shooting format itself. The names Service Rifle and Service Pistol stem from that the equipment permitted for these types of competitions traditionally were based on standard issue firearms used by one or several armed forces and civilian versions of these, while the terms Production, Factory and Stock often are applied to more modern disciplines with similar restrictions on equipment classes. Factory and service classes are often restrictive in nature, and the types of firearms permitted are usually rugged, versatile and affordable. In comparison, more expensive custom competition equipment are popular in more permissive equipment classes. Both types of equipment classes can be found within many disciplines, such as bullseye, field, practical and long range shooting.

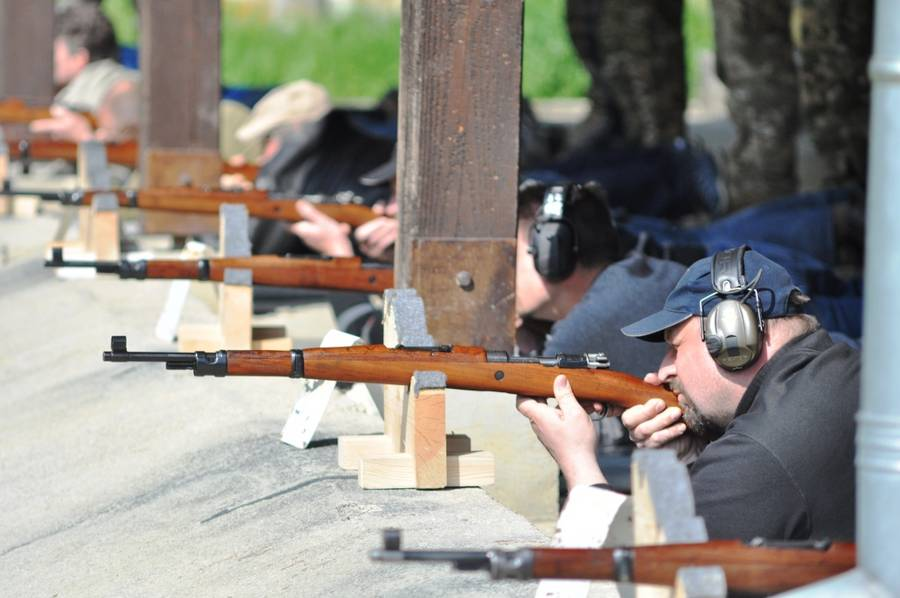
Service rifle shooting in Slovenia with the Zastava M48 rifle

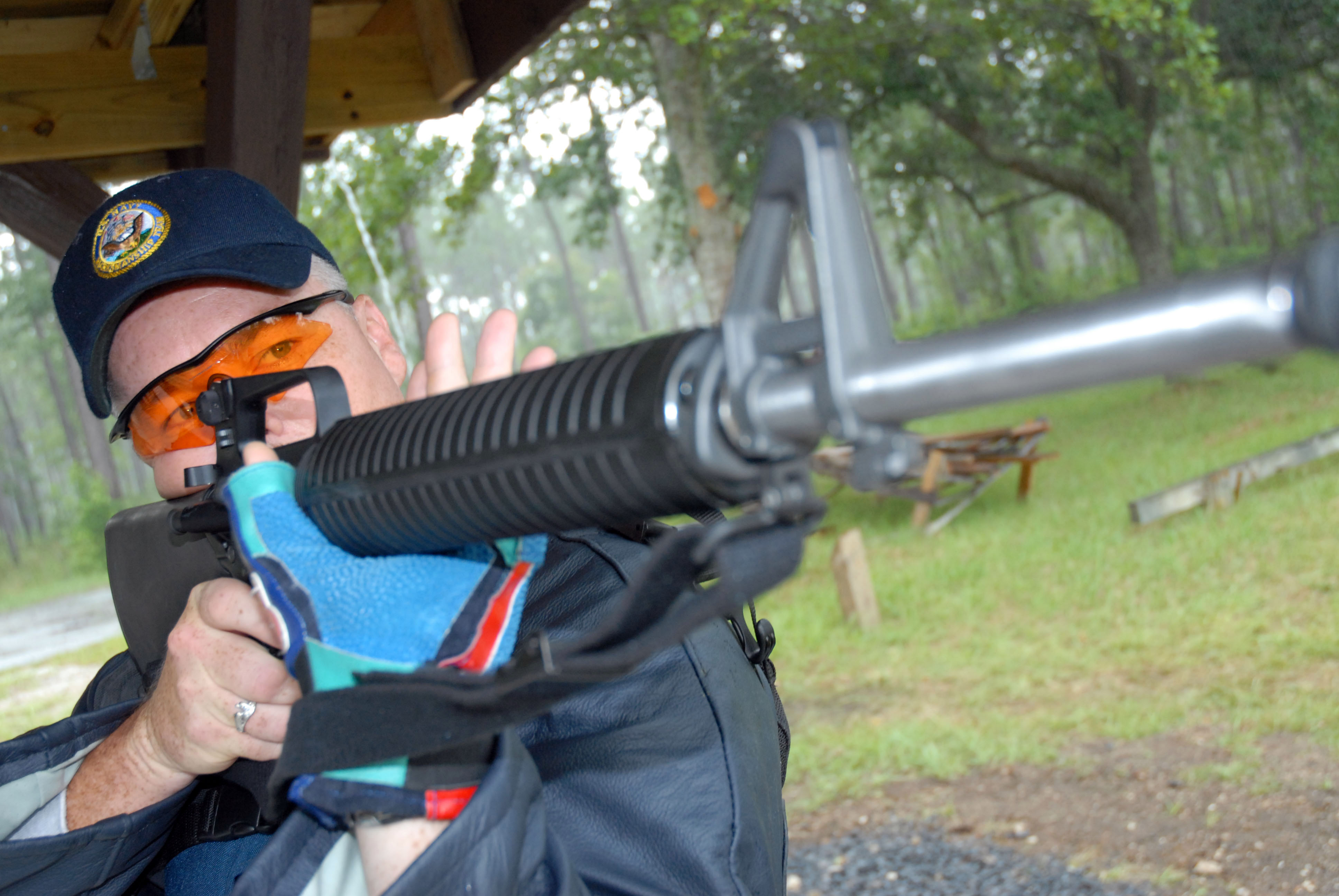
Service rifle shooting in United States with an M16/AR-15 style rifle

=== Plinking ===
Plinking refers to informal target shooting done for pleasure or practice typically at non-standard targets such as tin cans, logs, cartons, fruits, or any other homemade or naturally occurring objects like rocks (however, it is unsafe to shoot at rocks) or tree branches. The primary appeals of plinking as a sport are the broad variety of easily available locations, minimal costs, freedom in practice styles, and more relaxing and less restrictive shooting experience.

The flexibility of target choice is also why plinking is popular. A small, three-dimensional target in an outdoors setting is much more akin to a real-world hunting and varminting scenario, presenting a better simulated opportunity to practice shooting skills. A plinking target will also often react much more positively to a hit than a paper target used in formal competitions, either audibly with a sharp impact sound (hence the name "plink") or visually by bouncing, splattering or falling over. Steel targets used for formal action and long range shooting competitions are also popular for plinking due to the ease of setting up and confirming good hits.

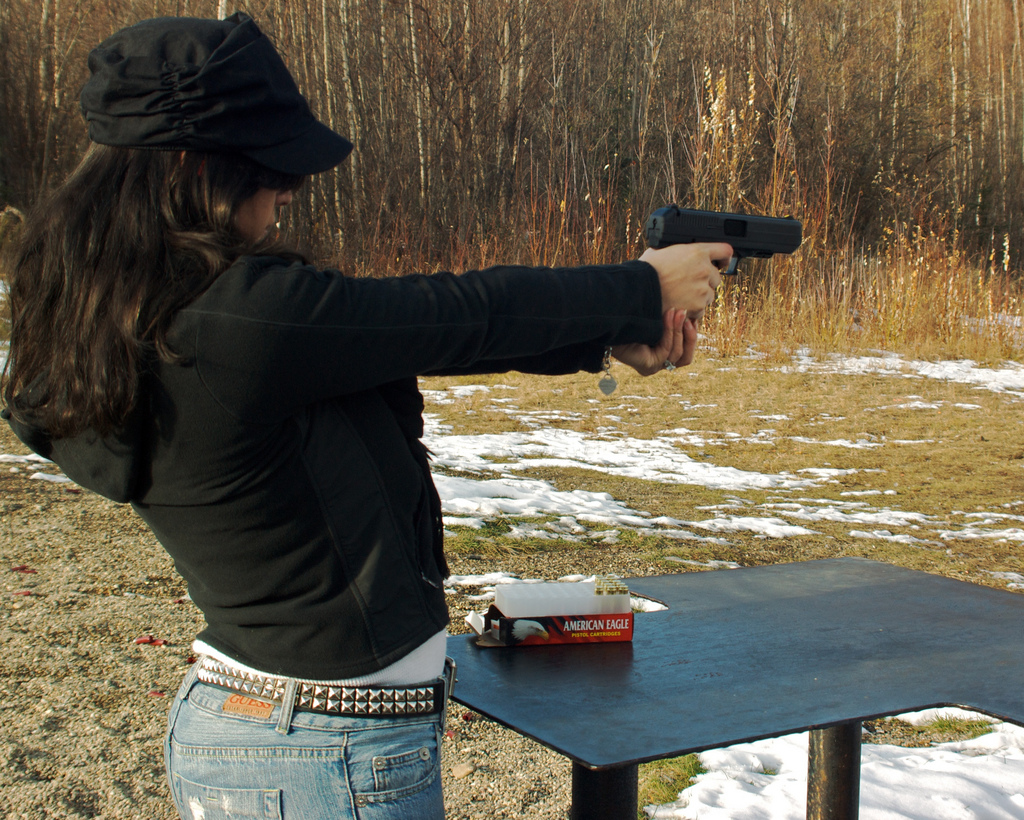
A woman plinking with a Hi-Point pistol in .40 S&W in Alaska

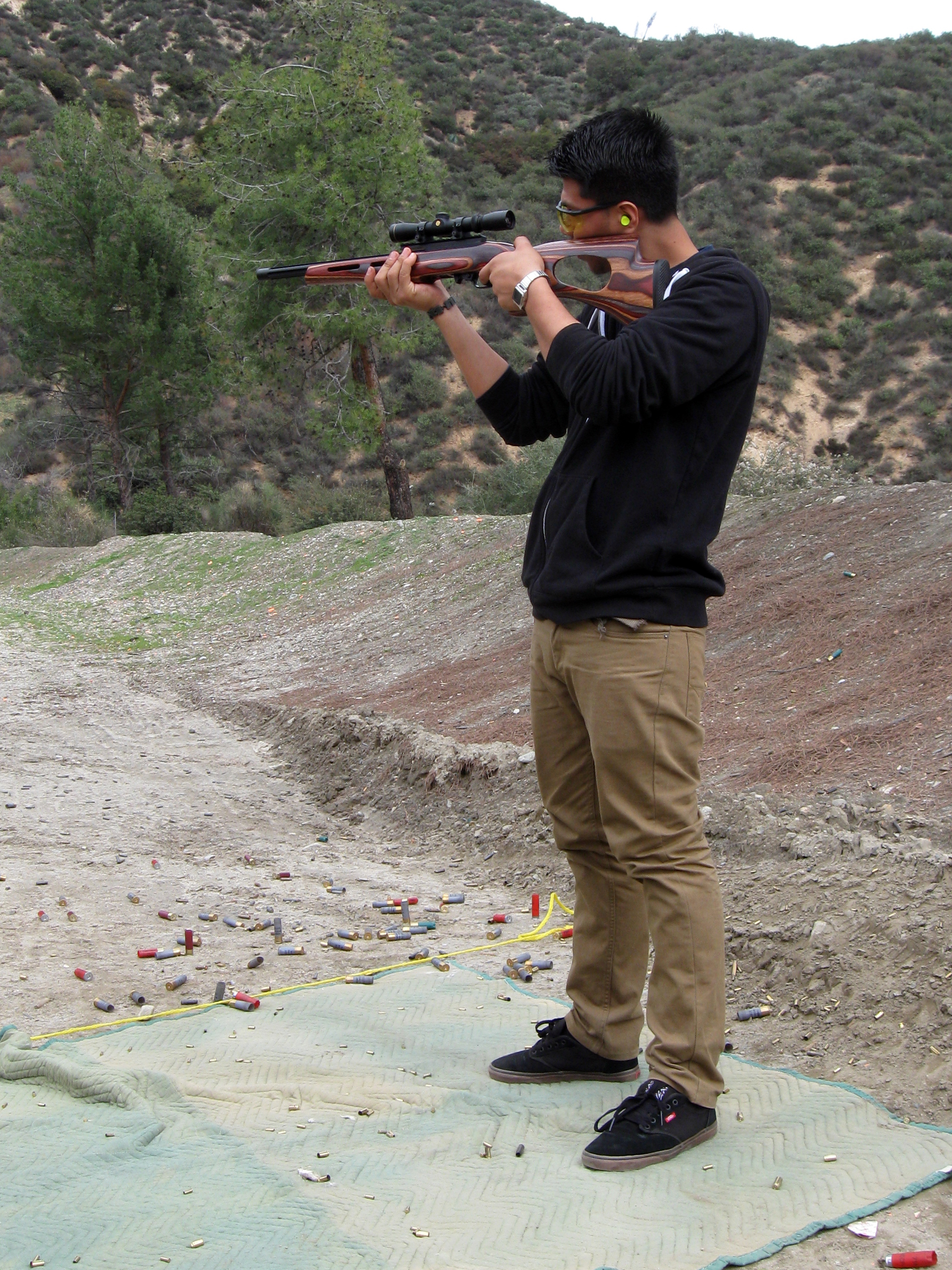
Plinking with a Ruger 10/22 rifle in Burro Canyon, Arizona, US

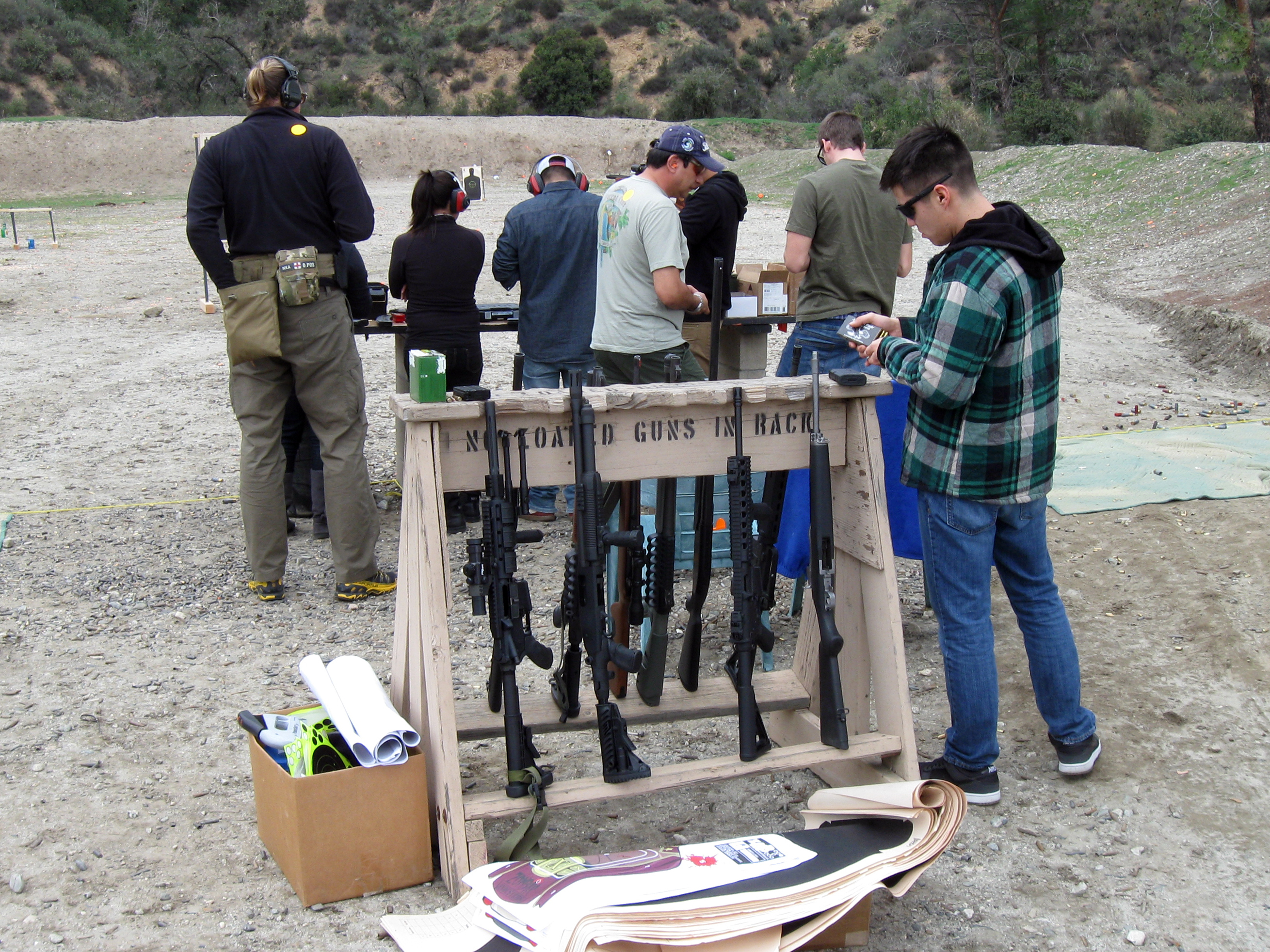
Plinking on a Saturday in Burro Canyon, Arizona, US. On this range firearms must be kept unloaded in the rack, except when on the firing line.

== Athletic shooting sports ==
Athletic shooting sports are hybrid events of normally stationary shooting sport competitions and the sport of athletics or other physically demanding non-shooting sports. Many were borne from military exercises and emphasize physical endurance.

- IBU Biathlon is a Winter Olympic sport combining cross-country skiing (normally freestyle skate skiing) and shooting with .22 LR rifles. In Scandinavia the discipline is simply known as "Ski Shooting" (Swedish: skidskytte, Danish: skiskydning, Norwegian: skiskyting).
- Bike biathlon or velo biathlon (Russian Велобиатлон) combines cycling (road or mountain bike) and shooting (handgun or rifle).
- ISSF Target Sprint combines medium-range run (3 × 400 m) and airgun shooting.
- Modern pentathlon is a Summer Olympic sport includes a combined event called Laser-run that consists of 4 laps of 800 metres combined with 4 rounds of timed shooting with a laser air pistol as one of its original five parts.
- Nordic Ski Field Shooting (Norwegian: skifeltskyting, Swedish: skidfältskytte) is a Nordic discipline organised by the National Rifle Association of Norway and the Swedish Shooting Sport Association which is based on the origins of modern biathlon. It is normally held using classic (in-track) skiing, but competitions can also be held in a freestyle skate skiing format. Furthermore, shooting is done with fullbore calibers and usually in the field from temporary shooting ranges. The discipline is considered as a near precursor to modern biathlon.
- Nordic shooting with cross-country running (Norwegian: skogsløp, Swedish: springfältskytte) is a Nordic discipline arranged by the National Rifle Association of Norway and the Swedish Shooting Sport Association which combines running with shooting. It is considered the summer edition of Ski Field Shooting. Running distances are usually between 2 and 3 kilometers with 2 to 3 shooting series.
- Military patrol was a team winter sport in which athletes competed in cross-country skiing, ski mountaineering and rifle shooting. It was usually contested between countries or military units.
- Moose biathlon (Finnish Hirvenhiihto) is a variation of biathlon comprising cross-country skiing, range estimation and rifle shooting at paper targets of moose. Moose shooting with cross-country running (Finnish Hirvenjuoksu) is a summer variant where the skiing part is replaced with running.
- Orienteering shooting (Finnish ampumasuunnistus) combines shooting with orienteering, and competitions are organised in Denmark by DMSA, in Sweden by the civilian Swedish Multisport Association and in Finland by the FRSF.
- Pistol shooting with cross-country running (maastokilpailu), organized in Finland by the FRSF.
- Pistol skiing (Norwegian pistollangren, Swedish pistolskidskytte, Finnish pistooliammuntahiihto) is biathlon with pistols and revolvers, and is organised in Norway by NROF, in Sweden by SPSA and in Finland by the FRSF.
- Summer biathlon, with skiing replaced by either running or rollerskis, is popular in Germany.
- Ski Archery is a variation of biathlon combining archery marksmanship with cross country skiing.
- Underwater target shooting is a combined underwater and shooting sport that tests a competitors' ability to accurately use a speargun via a set of individual and team events conducted in a swimming pool using free diving or Apnoea technique.
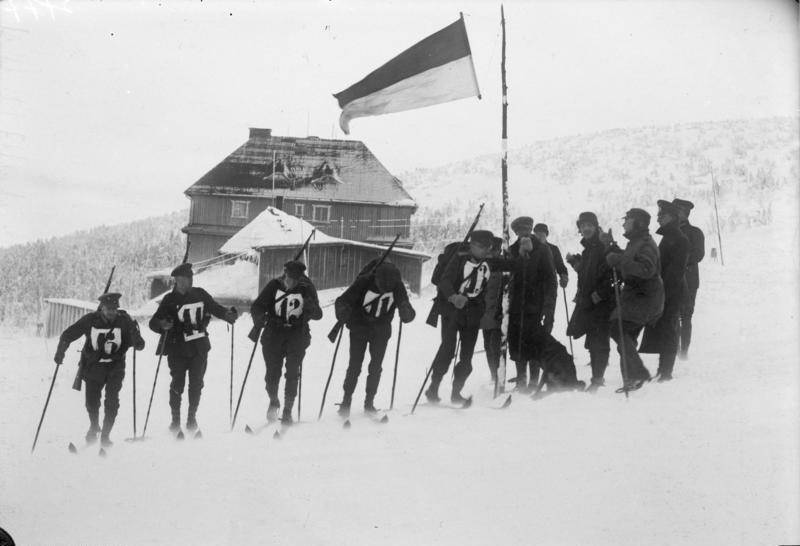
German military patrol in Giant Mountains in 1932

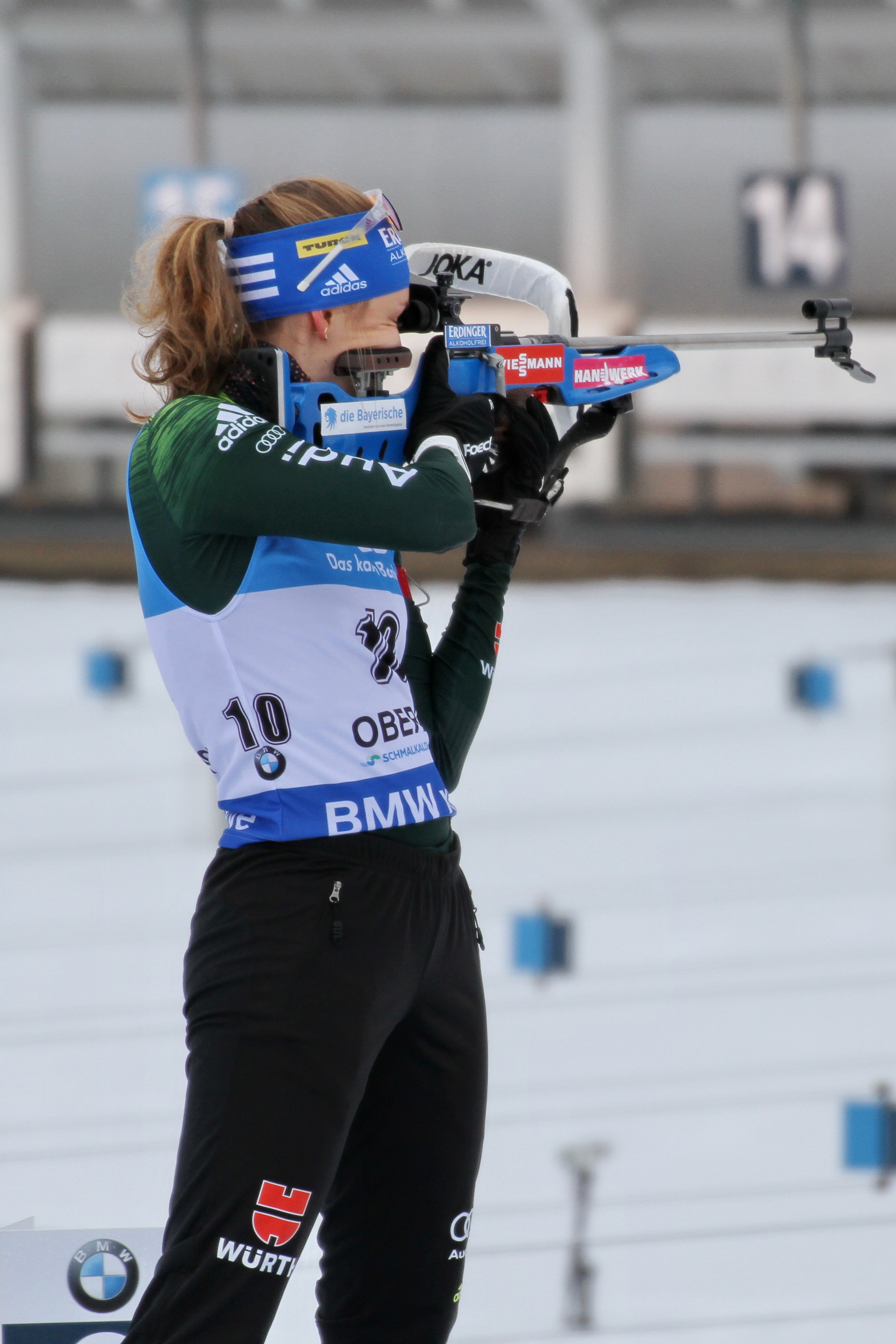
Standing phase at the 2018 Biathlon World Cup in Oberhof

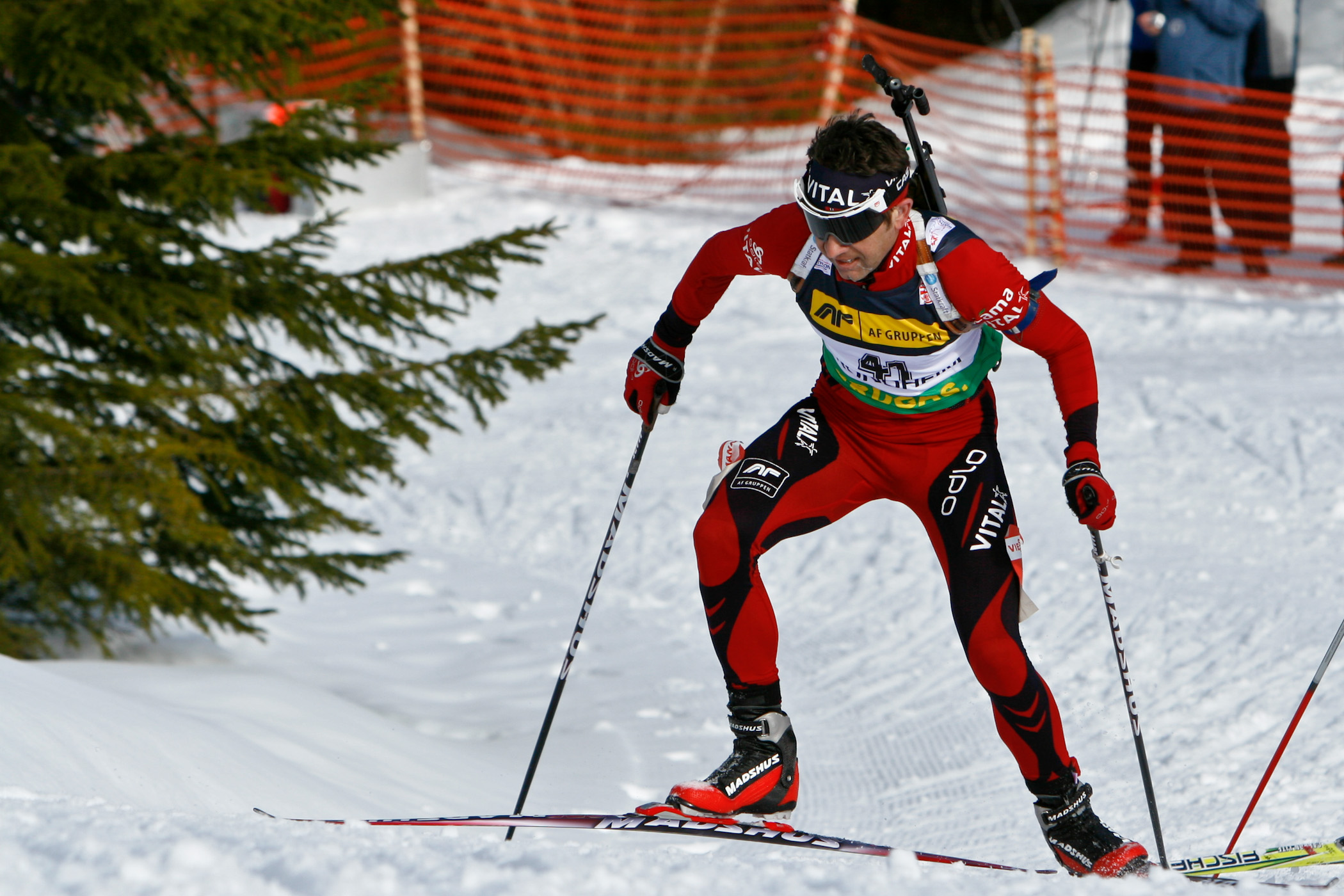
Ole Einar Bjørndalen in Trondheim during the 2009 Biathlon World Cup

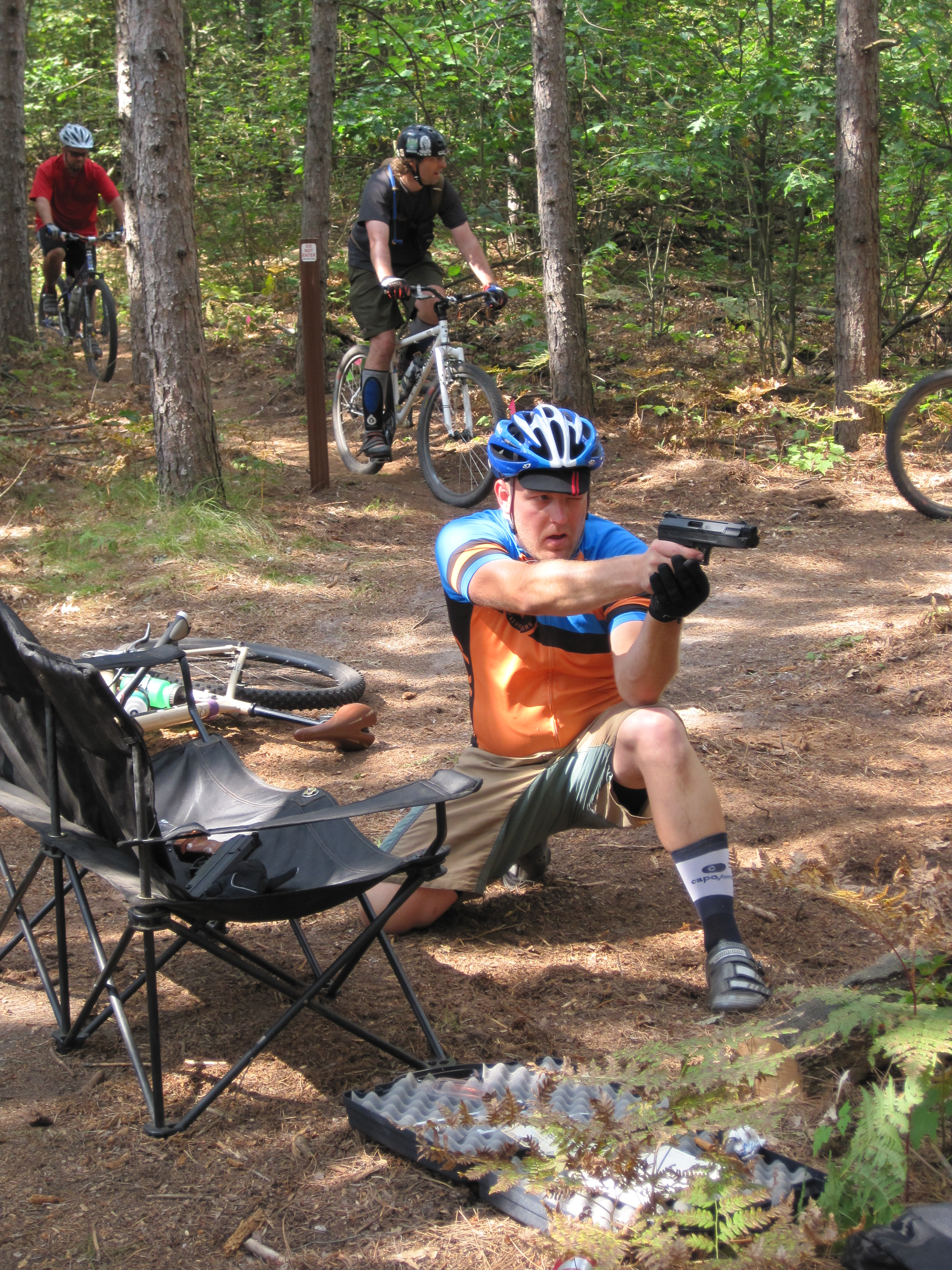
Bike biathlon competition using handguns

== Bow shooting sports ==
=== Archery ===
Modern competitive archery involves shooting arrows at a target for accuracy from a set distance or distances. A person who participates in archery is typically called an archer or a bowman, and a person who is fond of or an expert at archery is sometimes called a toxophilite. The most popular competitions worldwide are called target archery. Another form, particularly popular in Europe and America, is field archery, which generally is shot at targets set at various distances in a wooded setting. 3D archery, which differs from field archery in that the targets are animal models, is also quite popular in the same regions. There are also several other lesser-known and historical forms, as well as archery novelty games. The tournament rules vary from organization to organization. World Archery Federation rules are often considered normative, but large non-WA-affiliated archery organizations do exist with different rules. Competitive archery in the United States is governed by USA Archery and National Field Archery Association (NFAA), which also certifies instructors. Run archery is a shooting discipline connecting archery with running.

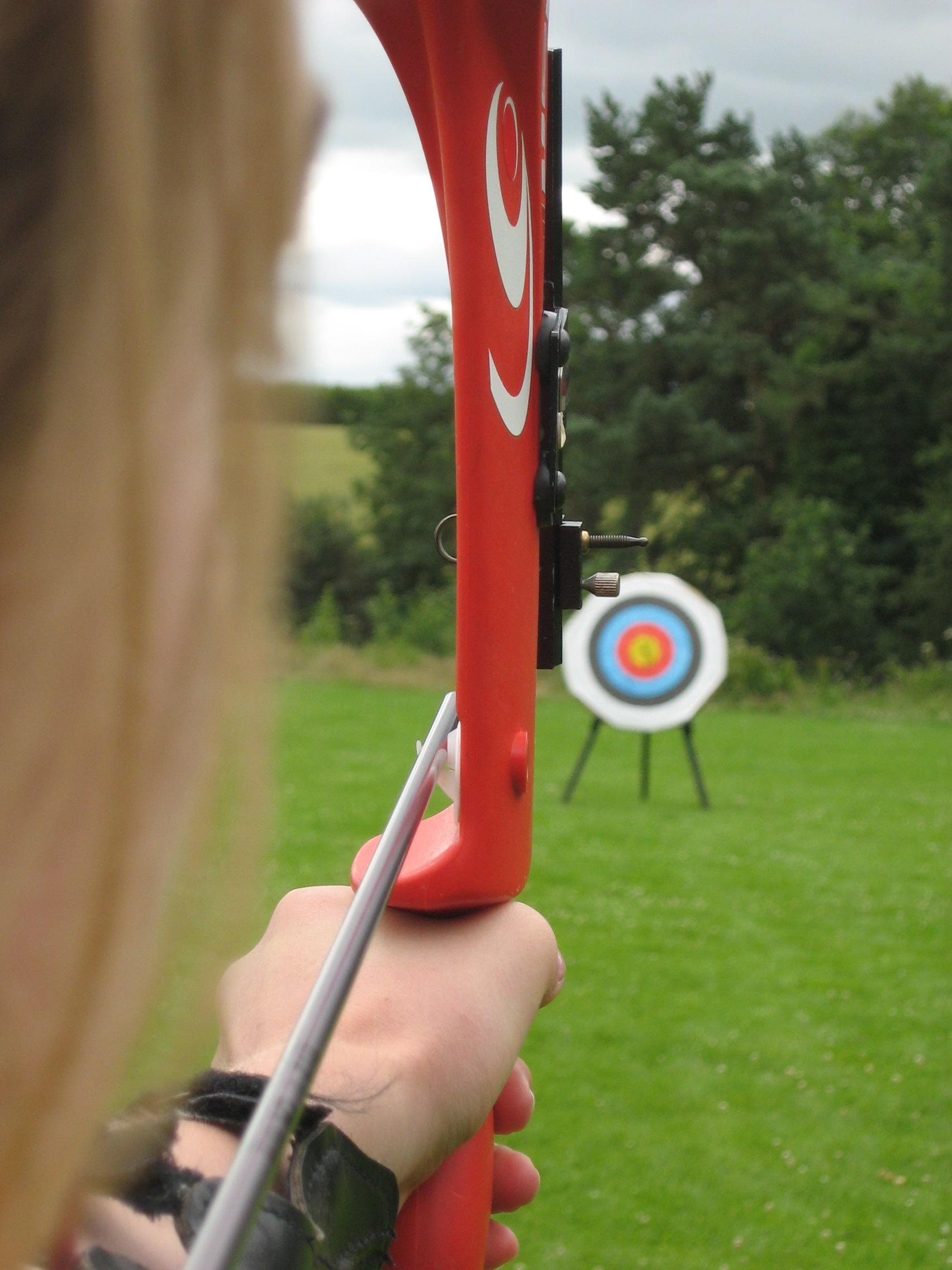
Target shooting with a recurve bow

Archery competition in Mönchengladbach, West Germany, June 1983

=== Crossbow ===
The International Crossbow Shooting Union (Internationale Armbrustschützen Union or IAU) was founded in Landshut, Germany on June 24, 1956, as the world governing body for crossbow target shooting. The IAU supervises World, Continental and International crossbow shooting championships in 3 disciplines; 30 m Match-crossbow, 10 m Match-crossbow and Field-crossbow shooting. IAU World Championships take place every two years with Continental Championships on intervening years. Other International and IAU-Cup events take place annually. World Crossbow Shooting Association (WCSA) organises competitions in 7 disciplines: Target, Target match play, Forest, Forest match play, 3D, Bench & prone target and Indoor target.

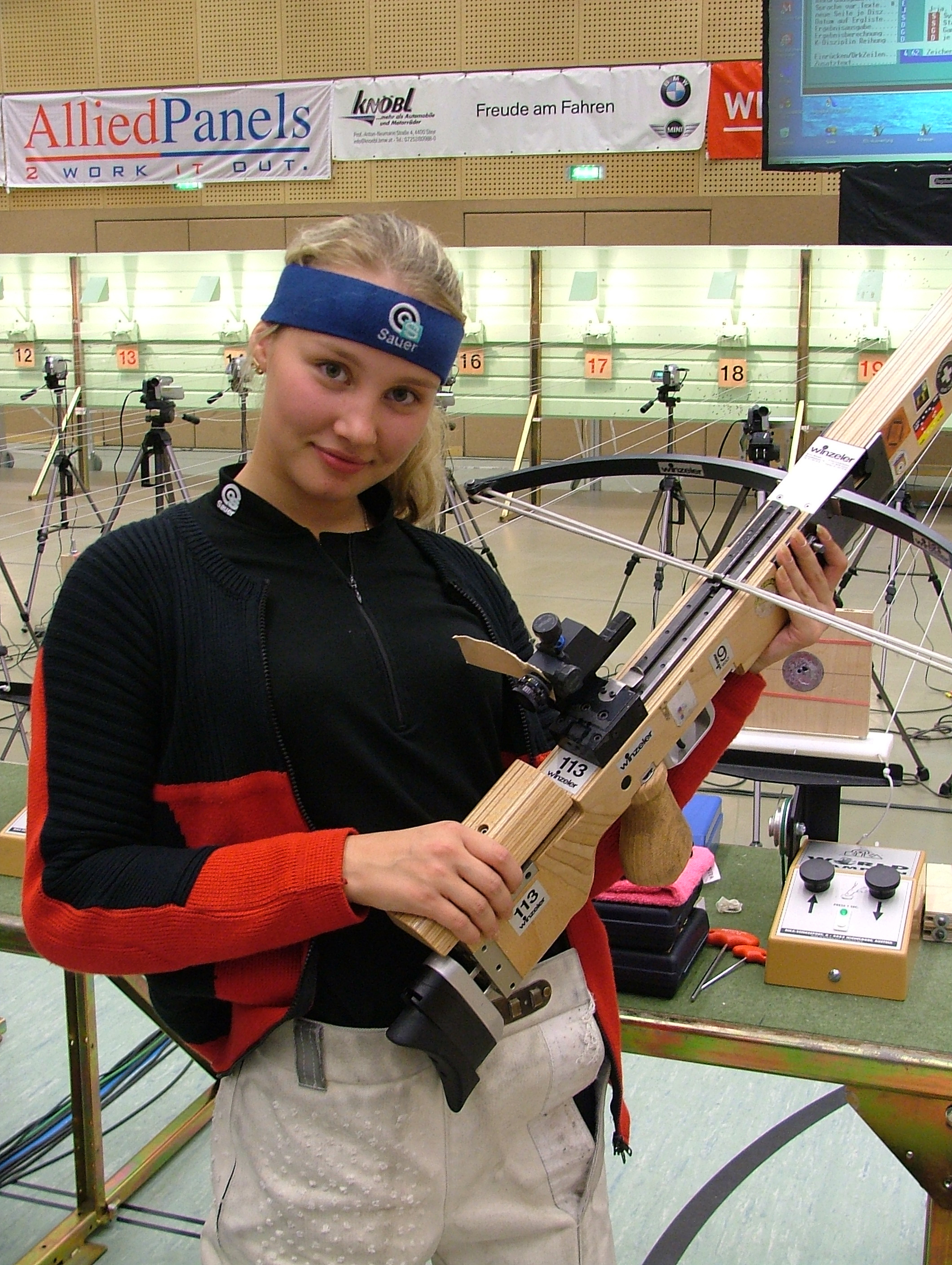
Anna Sushko of Russia, 2006 Junior World Champion, holding an ICU 10 m Match Crossbow

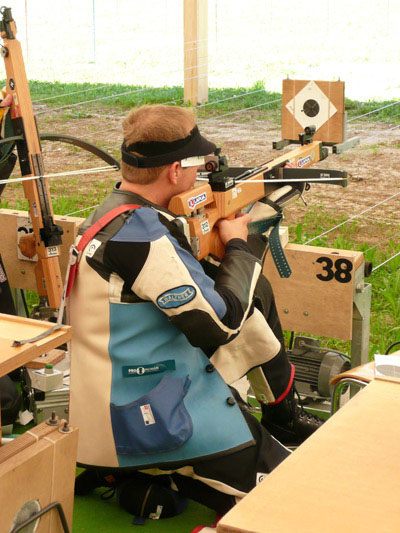
A competitor at the 30 meter event at the 2008 ICU Match-Crossbow World Championships in Sulgen, Switzerland

== Dart shooting sports ==
=== Sport blowgun ===
There are several competition styles of sport blowgun practised around the world. A standardization of competition style is based upon fukiya, and governed by the International Fukiyado Association. It is a 10-metre target shooting, using a standardized barrel caliber and length, and a standardized dart length and weight as outlined by IFA. There are two more styles, both based upon the Cherokee Annual Gathering Blowgun Competition. The Field Style competition is similar to the winter Biathlon, where the shooter runs from a starting line to a target lane, shoots and retrieves the darts, and continues to the next station. The course length varies from 400 to 800 m with from 9 to 16 targets at various heights and shooting distances. The final style is the Long Distance target shoot. The target is a circle of 24 cm diameter, and the firing line is 20 m away. Three darts are fired by each shooter, at least one of which must stick in the target. All successful shooters move to the next round, moving back 2 m each time.

== Confrontational shooting sports ==
Confrontational shooting sports is a set of relatively new team sports using non-lethal ranged weapons that are safe enough to shoot at other people. Previously such games were not possible due to safety concerns since bows and guns are generally too lethal and dangerous for human targets, but the development of newer airgun and infrared technologies allowed for the development of safe confrontational disciplines. While initially only for sport and recreations, professional sport competitions are now held. These types of games are also used for tactical gunfight training by military and law enforcement agencies to some extent.

=== Olympic dueling ===
Olympic dueling is an archaic individual sport that sought to safely emulate the deadly practice of pistol duelling, akin to fencing emulating sword fighting. It involved the use of specially built primer-fired pistols to propel wax bullets. Two versions of the sport were demonstration events at the 1906 Olympics and 1908 Olympics. It was also a popular sport in France.

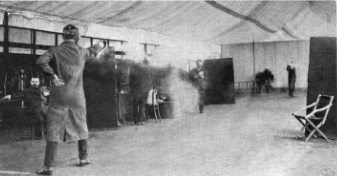
A duel at the 1908 Olympics

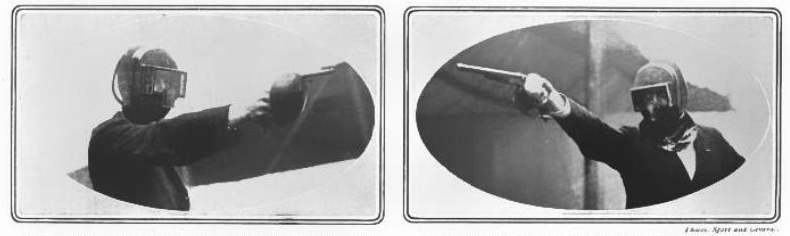
Portrait shots of Olympic duelists, showing their safety equipment and modified guns

=== Paintball ===
Paintball is a competitive sport in which players from opposing teams eliminate opponents out of play by hitting them with round, breakable, dye-filled oil and gelatin pellets ("paintballs"), shot from HPA/CO_{2}-powered air guns called paintball markers. It can be played on indoor or outdoor fields scattered with natural or artificial terrain, which players use for tactical cover. Paintball game types vary, but can include capture the flag, elimination, ammunition limits, defending or attacking a particular point or area, or capturing objects of interest hidden in the playing area. Depending on the variant played, games can last from seconds to hours, or even days in scenario play. The game was developed in the 1980s and is now regularly played at a formal sporting level with organized competition involving major tournaments, professional teams and players.

- National Xball League is the United States' professional paintball circuit. The league consists of a Professional Division, consisting of the best players the sport has to offer, that extends down to the beginner ranks of "Division 5" for those newer to the tournament atmosphere. The league hosts five national events across the country in places such as Las Vegas, Dallas, Nashville, Cleveland, Chicago, Atlantic City and Orlando throughout the year, starting in March and ending their season in early November. The league's largest event each year is the season finale known as the World Cup, with the 2016 World Cup hosted 3,554 players from 35 countries.
- National Collegiate Paintball Association is an all-volunteer, non-profit organization created by United States college players. The goal of the NCPA is to promote the positive aspects of the sport in an intercollegiate manner. The NCPA consists of two distinct classes which competes separately — Class AA is an open-class division where any college may enter and compete in regional and national tournaments. Class A is a closed-class division where only certain colleges may compete after securing a bid in the previous season, and represents the best talent of college paintball and includes universities such as Drexel University, University of Maryland, Illinois State University, Purdue University, University of Connecticut, Penn State University and 10 other teams across three conferences all fighting for a national title. The association's 2007 playoff tournament was aired on Fox Sports Net's digital cable college sports network, Fox College Sports.
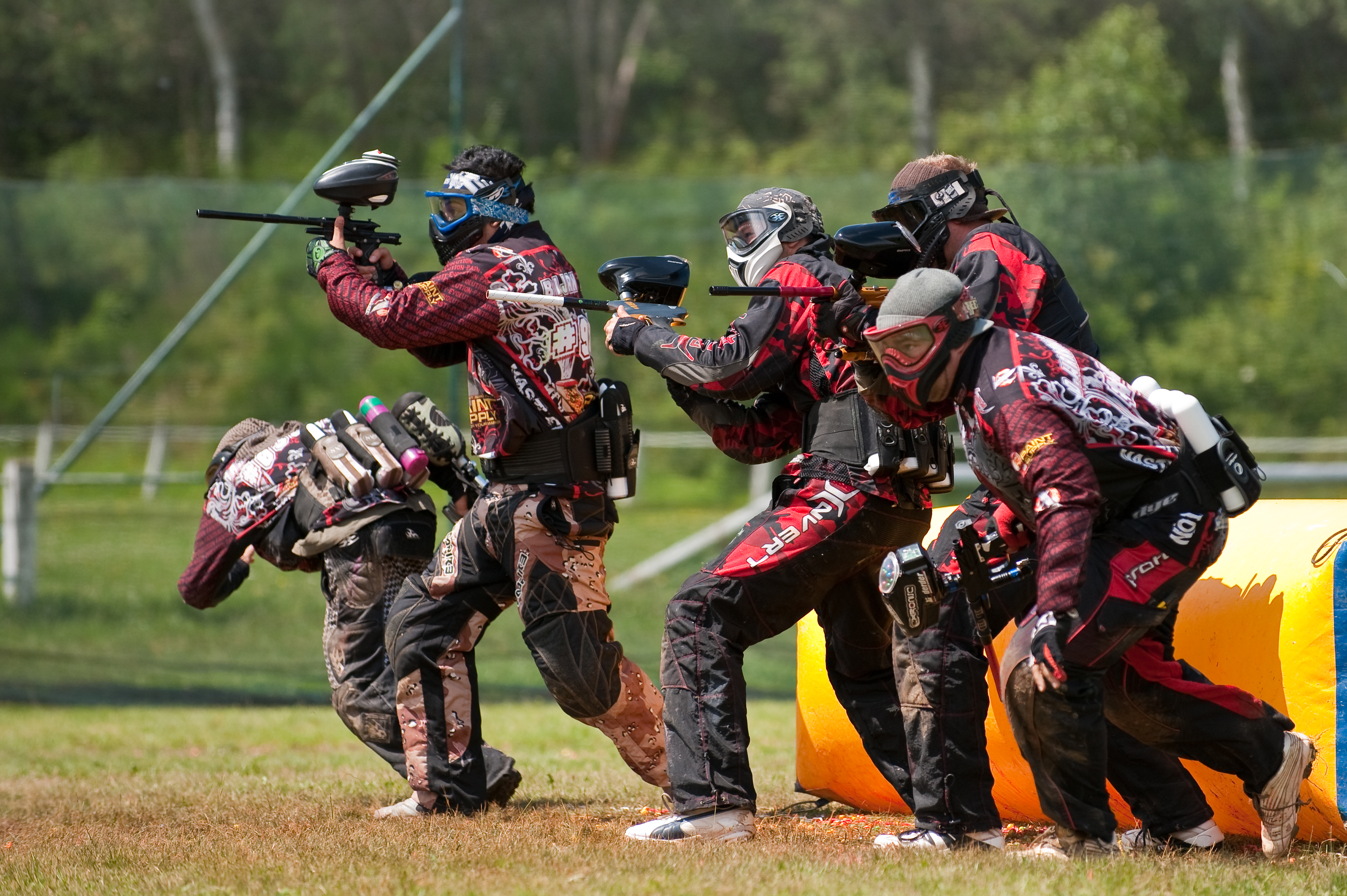
Players next to an inflatable Sup'Air bunker

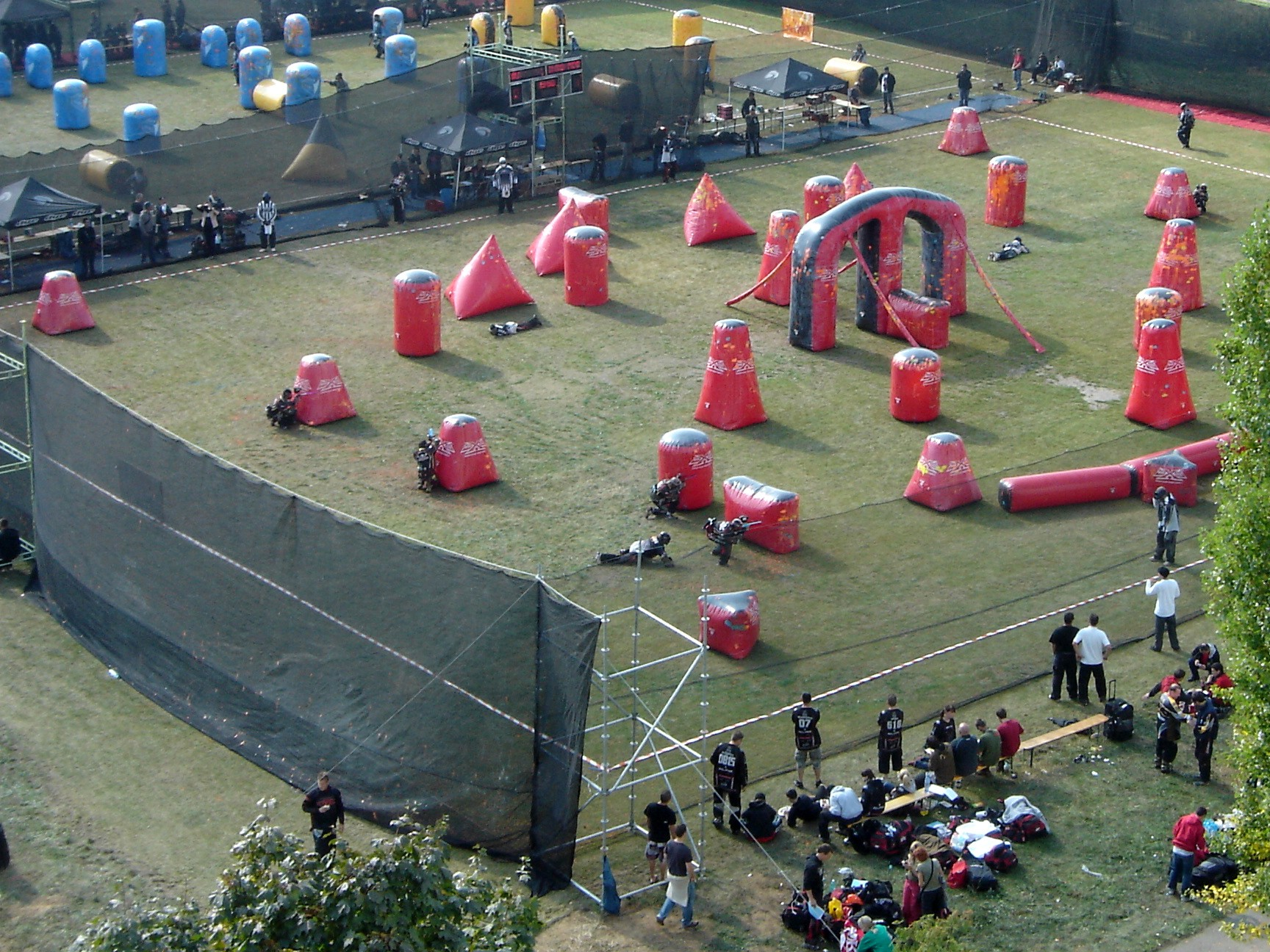
View of a course during a speedball game in progress

=== Airsoft ===
Airsoft is a competitive sport similar in concept to paintball, in which participants from opposing teams eliminate opponents by hitting each other with solid round plastic pellets launched from low-powered smoothbore air guns called airsoft guns. It is different from paintball in that airsoft pellets do not visibly mark the targets like paintballs, and thus the sport relies heavily on an honor system where a hit player has the ethical duty to call himself out of play, regardless of whether anyone else sees it happen. Most airsoft guns are also magazine-fed (unlike the commonly top-mounting pellet loader of paintball markers) with mounting platforms compatible with real firearm accessories, and tend to more closely resemble real guns in appearance, making them more popular for military simulation and historical reenactments. The greater toughness of airsoft pellets also allows the use of better powerplants and apparatus such as hop-up device for improved external ballistics, making the gameplay more accurately resemble real gunfights. They are also much cheaper for casual players to participate than paintball.

Airsoft gameplay varies in style and composition just like paintball and is played in both indoor and outdoor courses. Situations on the field frequently involve the use of real-life military tactics to achieve objectives, and it is not uncommon for participants to emulate the uniforms and equipment of real military and police organizations for a sense of realism. Games are normally supervised (and sometimes umpired) by trained on-site administrators, and players' airsoft guns are usually checked through a chronograph to enforce power output restrictions.

There are currently no formal national or international governing bodies for the airsoft sport. Competitive tournaments are usually organized by private clubs or among enthusiasts and professional/semi-professional teams (often referred to as "clans"), with rules and restrictions varying from event to event.

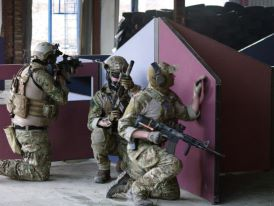
Three airsoft team members defending an area during an indoor CQB game

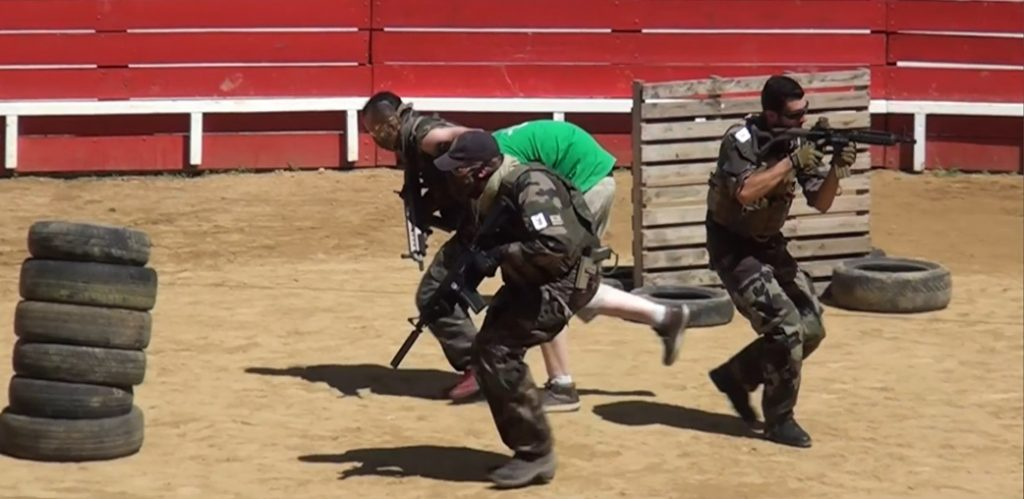
From an outdoor airsoft game

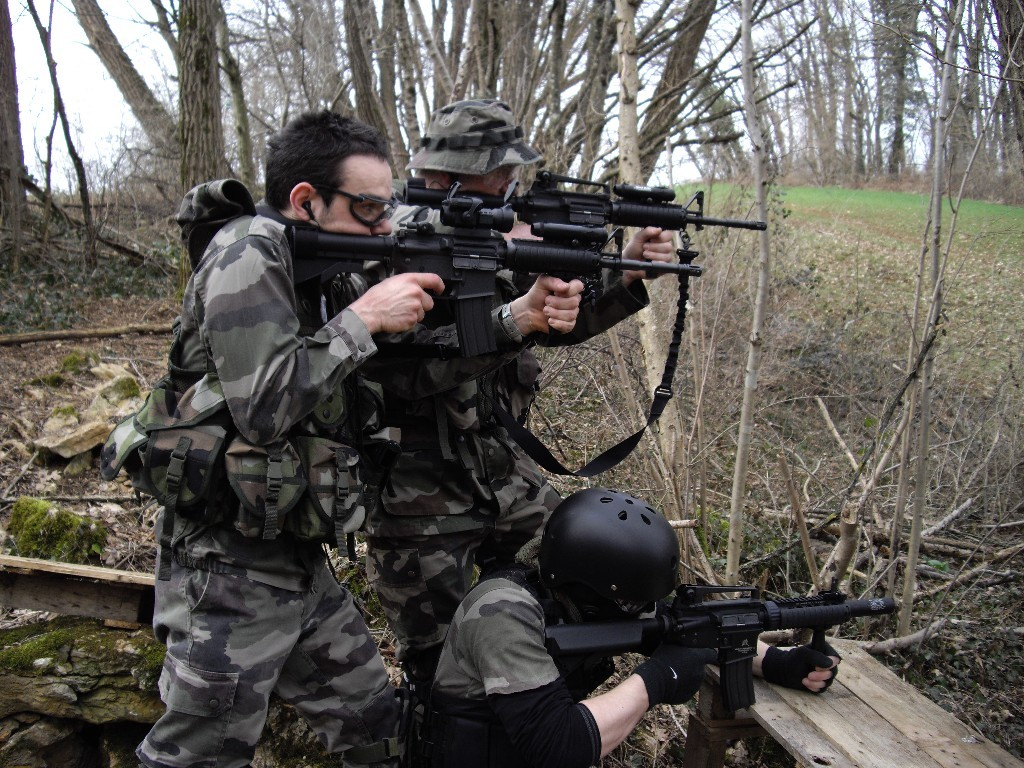
Three airsoft team members during a field game

=== Laser tag ===
Laser tag (despite the name, laser is actually not used due to safety concerns) is a tag game played with infrared light guns and sensors worn on the body of the players. Since its birth in 1979, laser tag has evolved in both indoor and outdoor games, each with gameplay styles such as annihilation, capture the flag, domination, VIP protection, (usually sci-fi) role playing, etc. When compared to paintball and airsoft, laser tag is painless and very safe because it involves no projectile impacts, and indoor games may be considered less physically demanding because most indoor venues prohibit running or roughhousing.

- Zone Laser Tag World Championships were international tournaments among professional/semi-professional teams from North American, Europe and Australia, hosted every few years since 2003.
- Bi-lateral international championships have included USA vs. Australia and Australia vs. South Africa.
- National tournaments in various countries including Australia, US, Sweden, Finland, UK, etc.
- Private club-level events such as TagCon (annual in UK and US), Tagfest (annual in US), Dropzone (annual in UK), LaserStorm (annual in Australia), etc.

More sophisticated forms of laser tag, such as MILES, are used (in conjunction with blanks) by militaries to allow for non-lethal combat training.

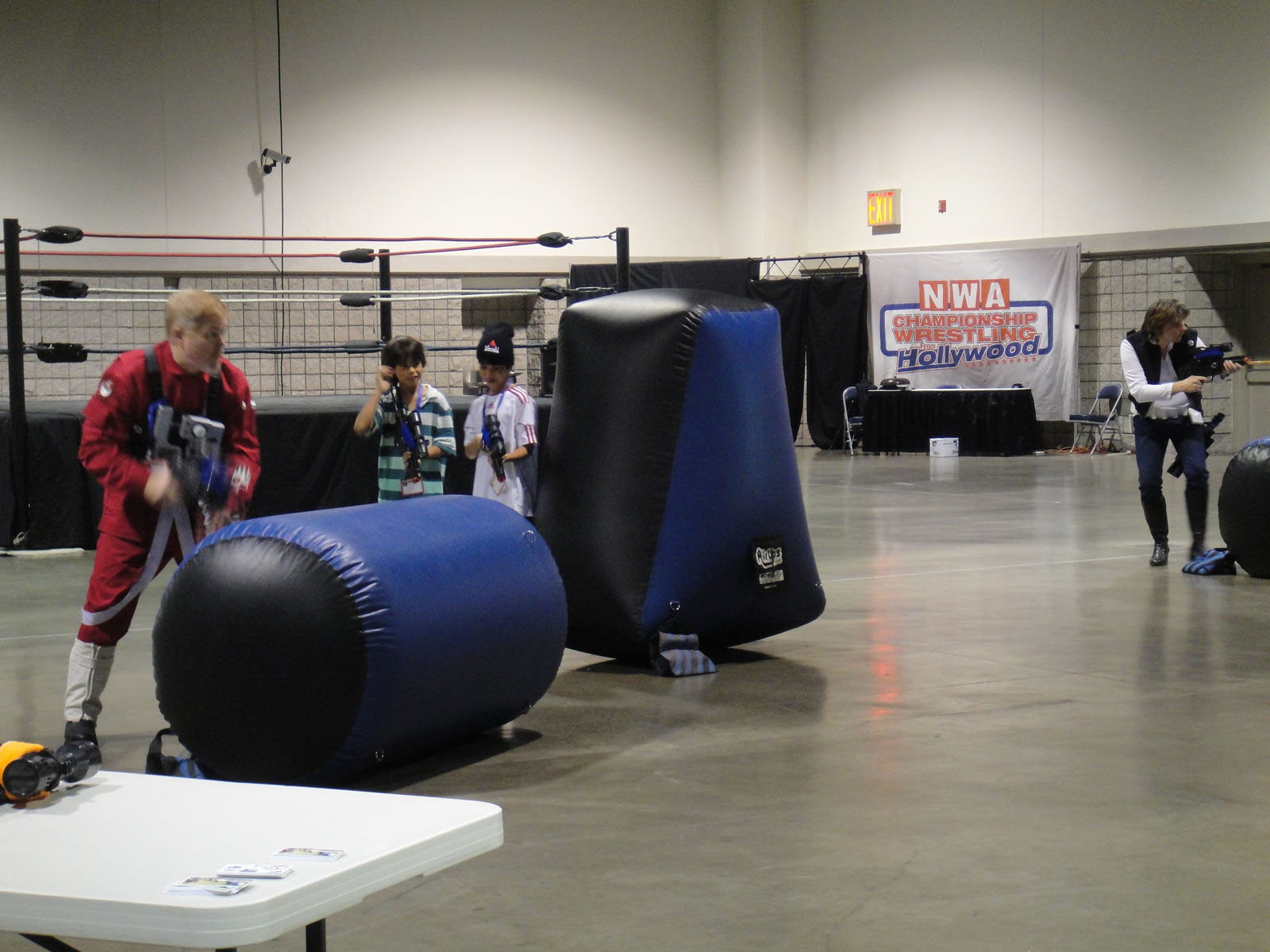
An indoor laser tag competition at Long Beach, California in 2011

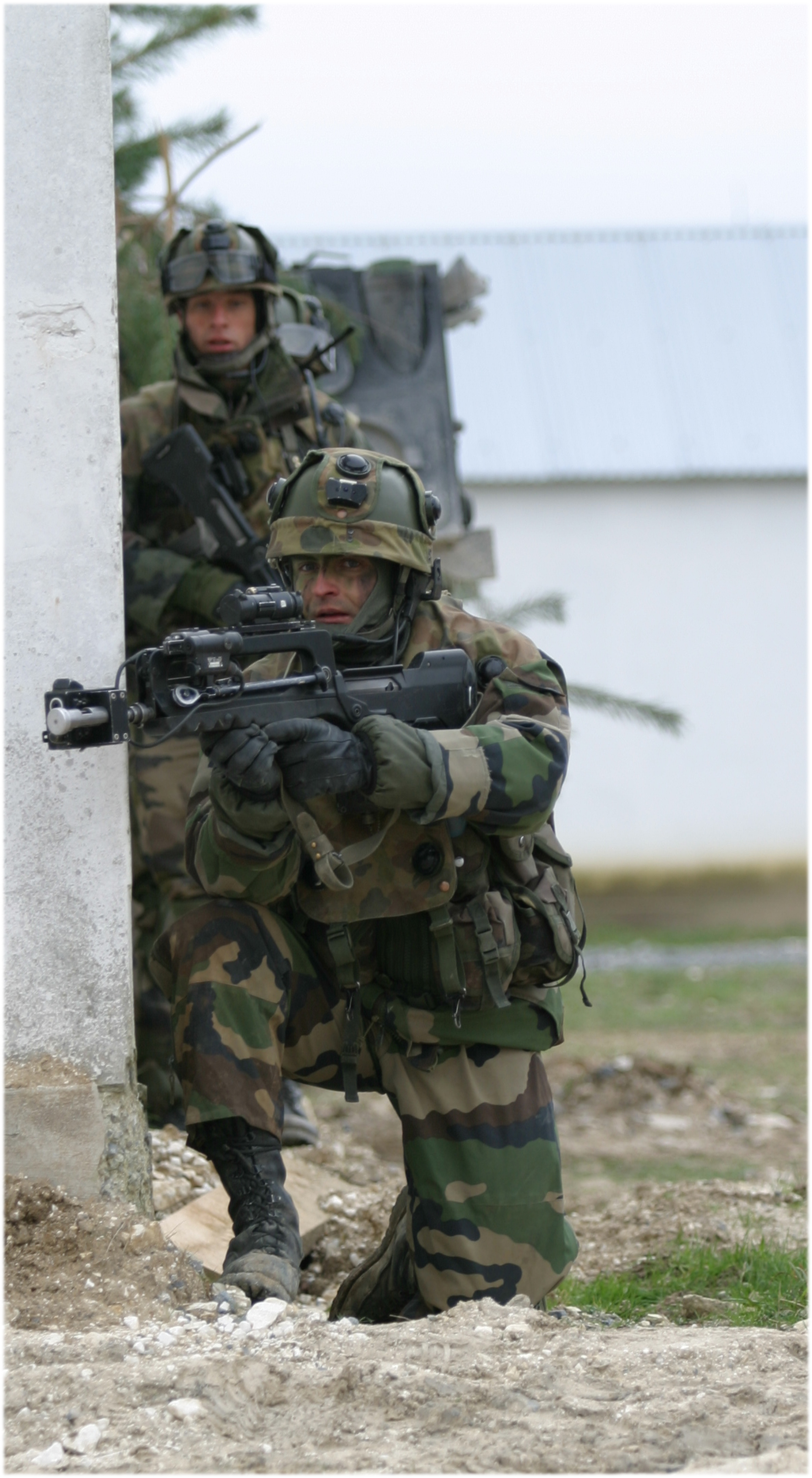
Soldiers equipped with laser tag training equipment

=== Archery Tag ===
Archery Tag is a form of combat archery sport where participants shoot one another using a bow with arrows with large foam tips. The game's rules closely resemble dodgeball. The game begins with a number of arrows in the center of the arena. At the whistle, players race to collect them, before firing them at one another across the playing field. A player is eliminated if struck by an arrow, and a player can bring an eliminated teammate back into play by catching an arrow. To avoid injury, participants wear protective facemasks and use bows with less than 30 pounds (14 kg) draw weight. It was invented in 2011 by John Jackson of Ashley, Indiana, and experienced a boost in popularity from the Hunger Games books and film series, which feature a bow-wielding protagonist Katniss Everdeen. Jackson staged Archery Tag games at local premieres of the films. By 2014, Jackson had licensed the game to 170 locations, mostly in the United States, but also in Russia, Peru and Saudi Arabia.

Battle gaming variants of Archery Tag also exist, such as Dagorhir, Amtgard, Belegarth and Darkon, where archers are pitted among melee players welding foam weapons to simulate medieval battles.

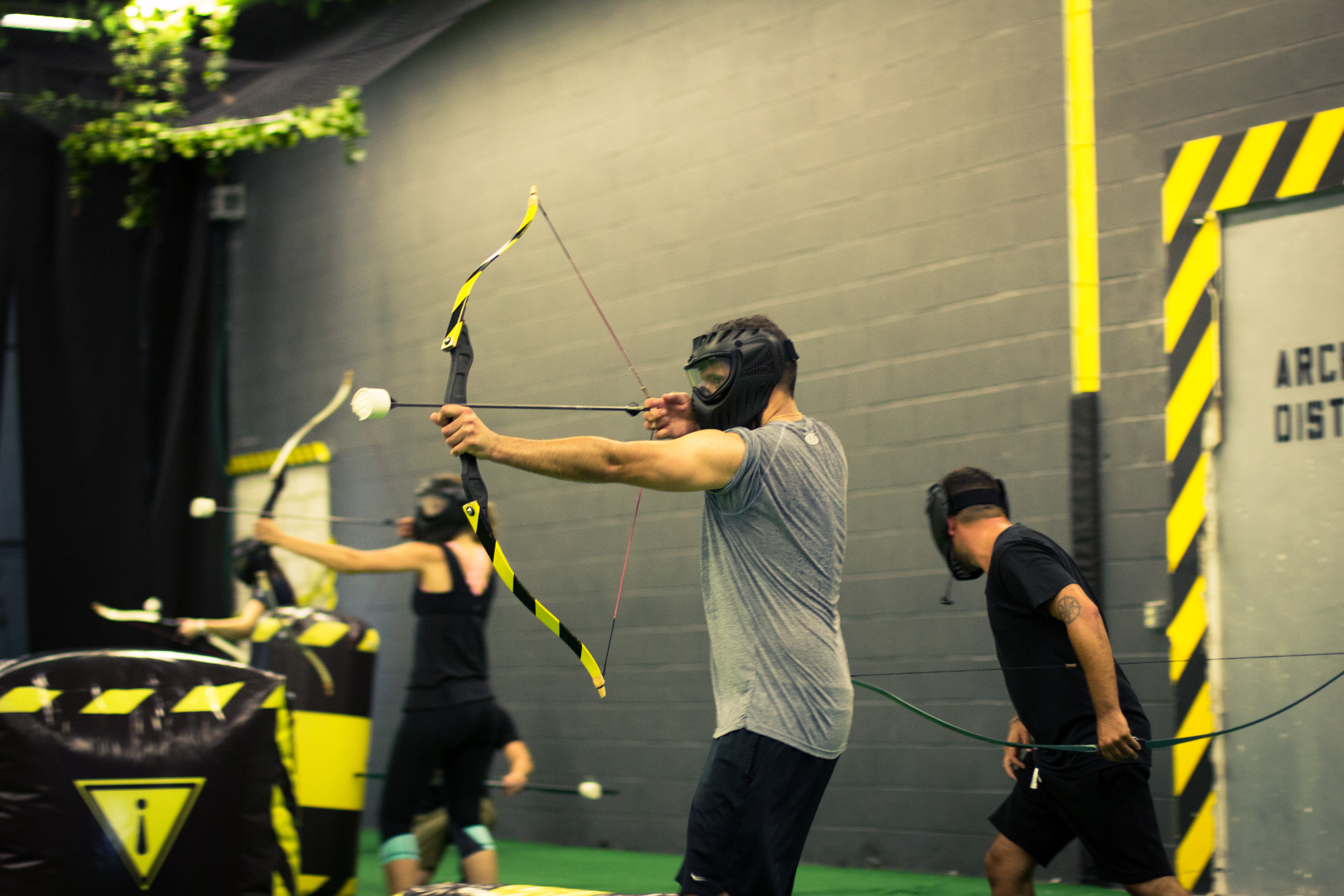
A game of archery tag in Toronto

=== Esports ===
Esports is the competitive playing of video games, often referring to play at the professional level. While the term esports includes many types of video games unrelated to shooting sports, a major subset of esports are the shooters, namely first-person shooters and third-person shooters. Matches of these games can take a variety of forms but traditionally take formats similar to paintball, involving teams of players whose objective is to eliminate the opposing team in simulated combat, often while also focusing other key objectives. Major games of these styles currently in professional play include (among others) Counter-Strike: Global Offensive, Overwatch, Team Fortress 2, Valorant, and PlayerUnknown's Battlegrounds. Organized play is done both online or in-person. While there has been serious interest to include esports in the Olympics and similar events, the inclusion of shooters has been less welcomed due to their often violent visual content.

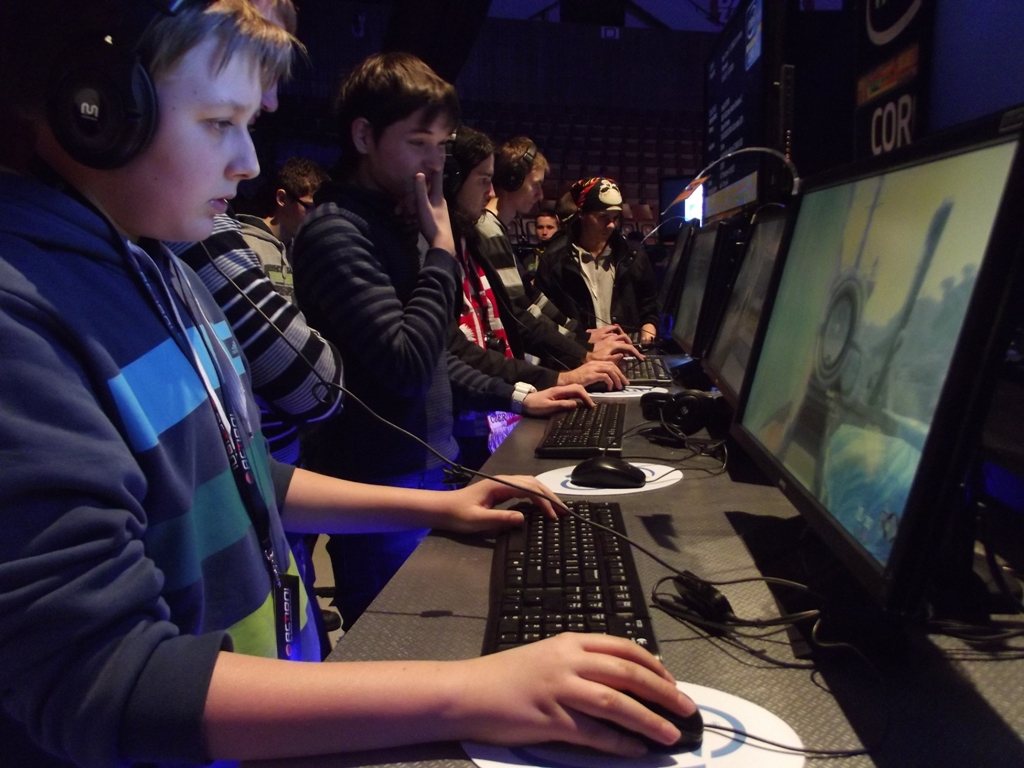
Casual players playing a shooter at the 2013 Intel Extreme Masters in Katowice, Poland

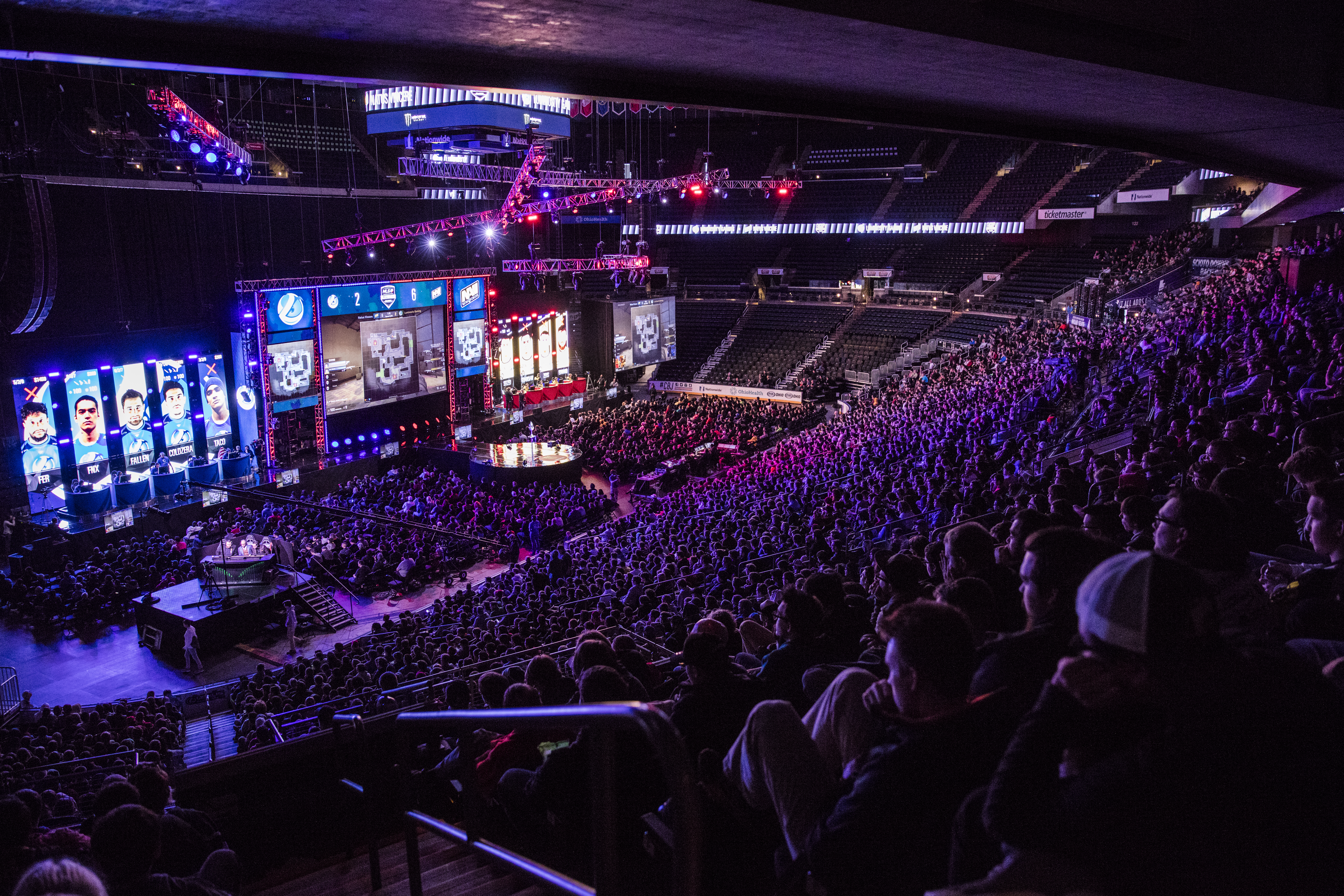
A live professional CS:GO match in 2016

== See also ==
- List of shooting sports organizations
- Shooting sports in Canada
- Shooting ranges in Switzerland
- Shooting targets
- Air travel with firearms and ammunition
- Plinking
- Shot grouping
- Schützenverein
- Zimmerstutzen (in German)
