= Thomas Høgåsseter =

Shooter

Thomas Høgåsseter is a Norwegian shooter who won the 2014 and 2015 Norwegian National Cup of Stang and Field Rapid Shooting. He also has the official Mad minute World Record of 36 hits in one minute.
