= Electronic scoring system =

Automated scoring system for sport shooting

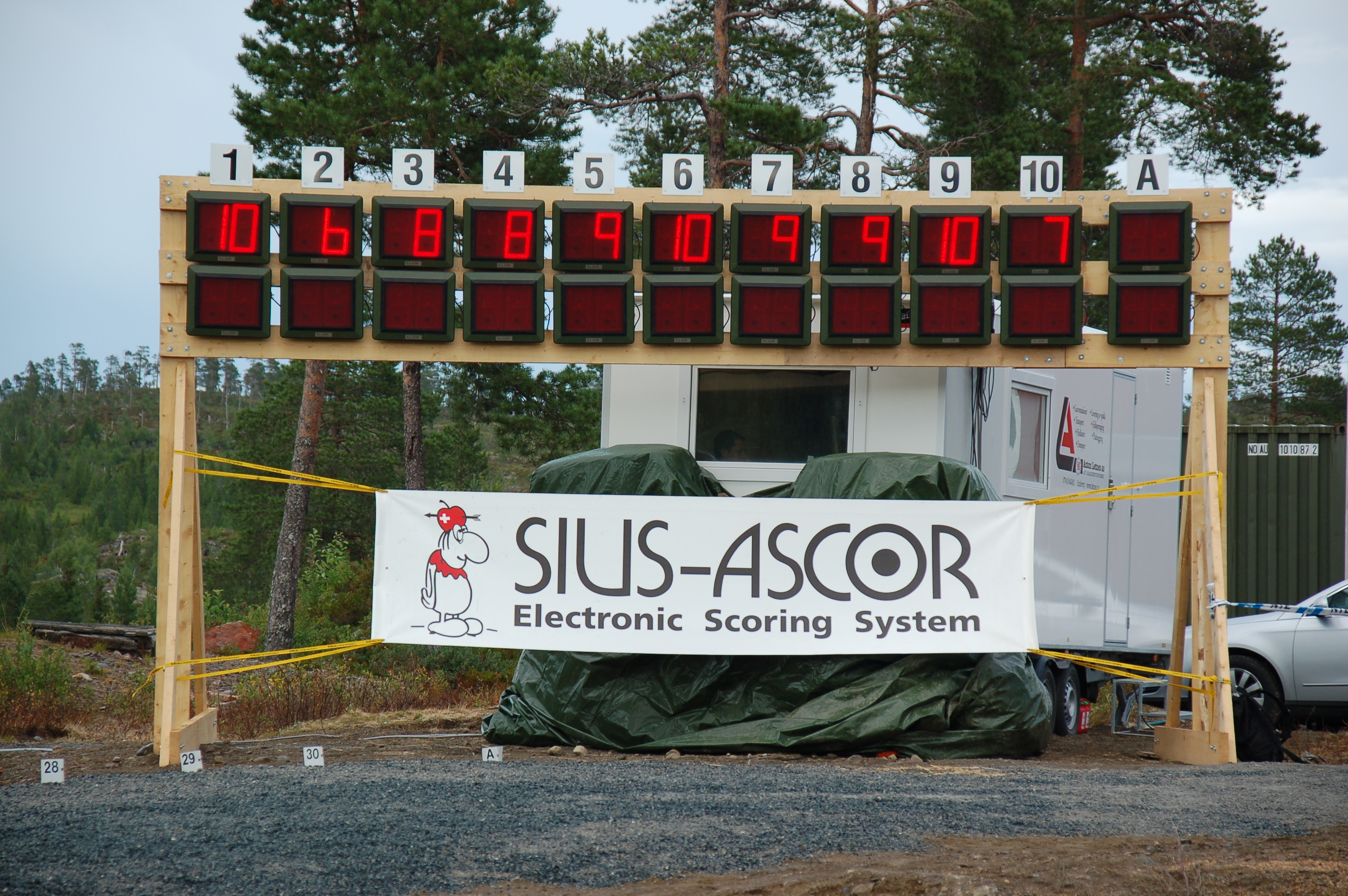
An electronic scoring board used for stangskyting in Norway in 2007 showing the number of hits for each shooter after the first half.

Electronic scoring systems or electronic targets are automated scoring systems used for sport shooting where the shot placement and score is automatically calculated using electronics and presented on screens to the organizer and shooters. The score may also be shown on a big screen for audience at the shooting range, improving the spectator experience.

With traditional paper targets, the audience of a shooting match may have to understand the signals used for scoring and monitor the scores of multiple targets at once, whereas, with electronics, the current scores can be shown on screens immediately after the shot is fired, allowing the audience to quickly see how different shooters compare to each other. Electronic targets automatically gauge the hits so that no physical inspection of hits is needed. Some systems even allow real time publishing on the internet. Scoring can also be held back by the Range Officer (the shooting supervisor) until the string of fire is finished in order to show the scores for each competitor in ascending order.

== Usage ==
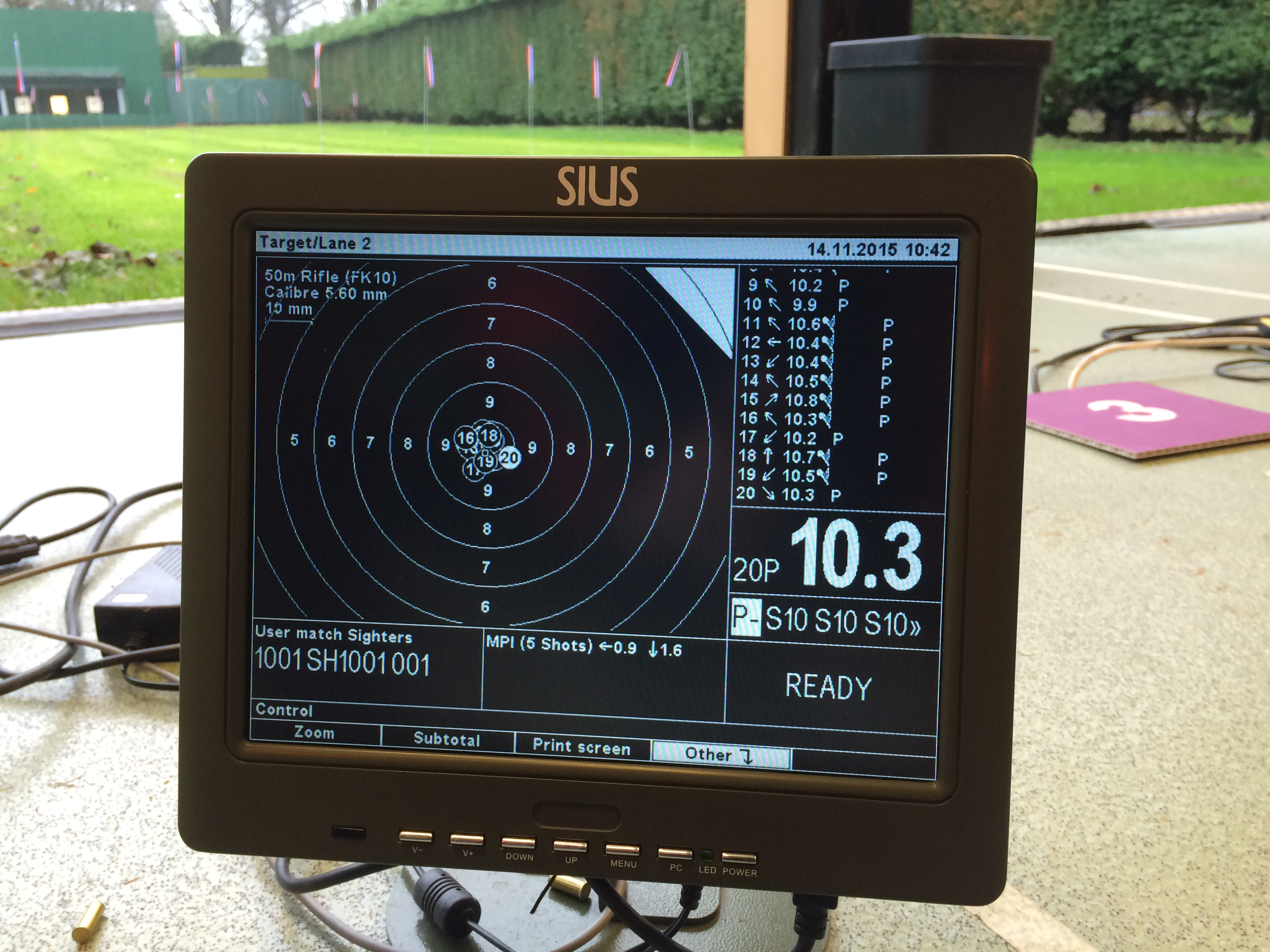
Sius Ascor target monitor on a 50metre training range

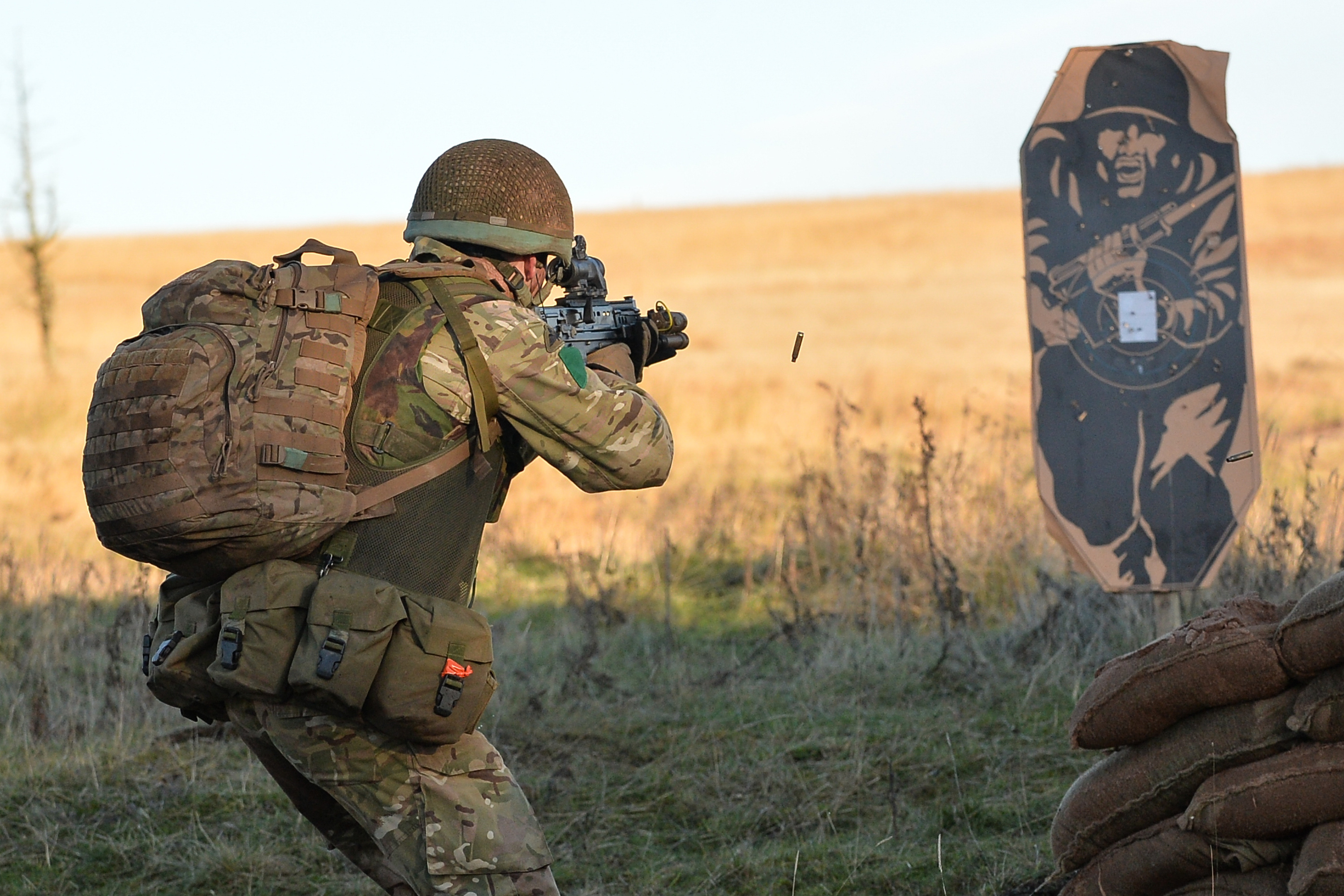
A British paratrooper from 3rd Battalion, Parachute Regiment engaging a close range electronic knock-down target.

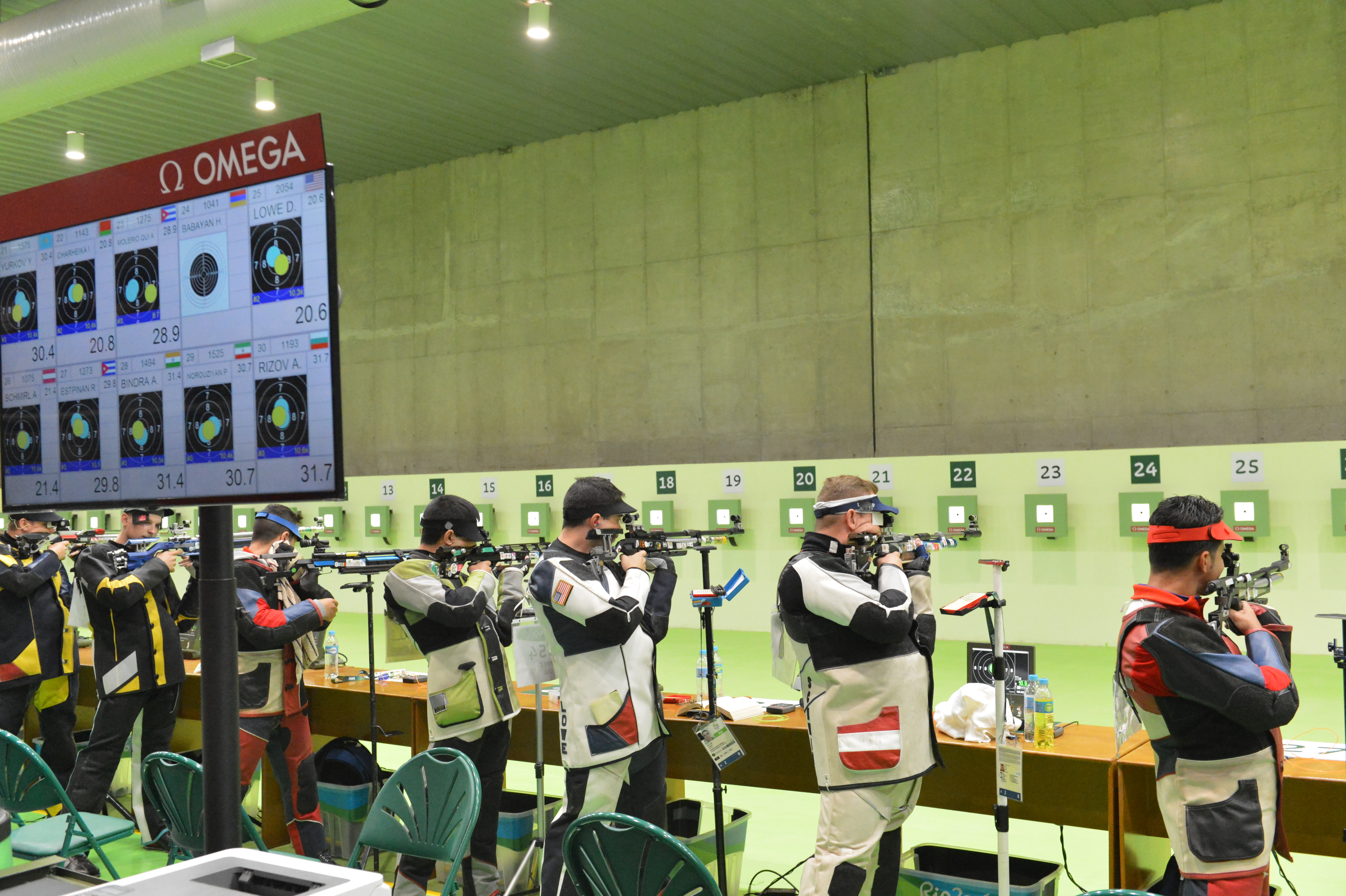
Electronic scoring system used at the 2016 Summer Olympics 10 meter air rifle competition

Electronic targets are used for all types of sport shooting, from airguns through to large calibre rifle shooting. Targets may be static, "running" (moving targets on rails, like the ISSF 50 meter running target) as well as electronic and "reset" knock down targets used by militaries. Targets are available for calibers ranging from air gun pellets up to the 105 mm tank shell.

=== Advantages ===
Some advantages of electronic scoring systems are that:

- It makes organizing matches easier, since the scores are calculated automatically.
- It provides the shooter immediate and precise feedback, and can be used for training and competition.
- Real time scoring is often more exciting to the audience, as they do not have to wait for paper targets to be retrieved, scored and for results to be compiled and announced.

=== Disadvantages ===
Some disadvantages of electronic scoring systems are that:

- There are relatively high construction costs, and often a need for continuous maintenance.
- They can be vulnerable to lightning strikes because of long cables in the ground combined with sensitive electronics.
- The cables around the target stand are vulnerable to bullets. This can especially be a problem in speed shooting competitions where some of the shots may miss the target. To protect the cables, brackets made of hardened steel have been used in Stang shooting (Stangskyting) and Nordic field rapid shooting (Felthurtigskyting).

=== ISSF Certification Programme ===
The International Shooting Sport Federation certifies electronic targets for use in sanctioned competitions such as World Cups, World Championships and the Olympic Games.

- Phase I establishes target function and accuracy.
- Phase II tests under competition conditions
- Phase III does not concern the target directly, but requires software integration and compatibility with the ISSF Results Service and the ability to provide services such as on-screen graphics for broadcasters.

As of 2015, only Sius Ascor held any Phase III certifications. Other manufacturers had not submitted systems for Phase III certification since Sius AG held a sponsor agreement for major championships (all Olympic Qualifying competitions) through to 2020 which precluded any other systems being used, regardless of certification status. This agreement was later extended to 2024.

In November 2022, the ISSF announced that they would restart the EST Certification programme in 2023, as no certifications had been conducted since 2015.

== Mechanism ==
All types of electronic targets use some form of trigonometric equations to triangulate the position of bullet impact.

=== Sound triangulation ===
Sound-chamber targets are the oldest type of electronic targets, and use the Mach wave of the bullet to determine its position as it passes through the target. The first sound-chamber system for big-bore rifles was patented in 1975, and was used for the first time in a world championship in 1982.

It functions by using microphones to measure the sound wave of the projectile as it passes through the target. The target is built like a frame and covered with rubber sheets on the front and back, providing an almost sound-tight chamber. Inside the chamber there are microphones, either three in the bottom of the frame, or one in each of the four corners. Additionally, the air temperature inside the target is measured to precisely calculate the speed of sound. To avoid large temperature fluctuations, the target is insulated in the front and back using insulating material such as styrofoam. The target seen by the shooter is painted on the insulation material. To keep the sound-chamber somewhat tight, there is an additional rubber liner outside the main rubber liner, which can be turned manually or with an electric motor at certain intervals to prevent the holes in the sound chamber from becoming too large.

Systems for ISSF-style competition cannot record the mach wave as these disciplines use air pellets and subsonic .22lr ammunition. These systems use a consumable belt, made of rubber for live ammunition and paper for air pellets. The microphone array detects the sound of the projectile striking the belt. The belt progresses after each shot to present fresh material. This avoids a hole forming through which shots could pass without being registered.

With the increasing availability of consumer prototyping boards and microcontrollers, the freETarget project was launched in 2020 with the aim of producing an open source design for an acoustic-based airgun target. The system was ultimately developed around an Arduino board and could be assembled by hobbyists far cheaper than proprietary systems on the market.

=== Light triangulation ===
Meyton developed the concept of scoring based on a light barrier in the 1990s. In 2010, Sius Ascor released Laserscore, the first electronic target system using lasers: it is able to determine the position of a bullet with a claimed accuracy of a few hundredths of a millimeter by using three infrared lasers. Since the measuring method is optical there is no need for a rubber or paper belt as used in some acoustic targets. The elimination of moving or mechanical components makes light-based targets almost free from wear and maintenance.

Other manufacturers including Megalink have gone on to offer optical systems. The Megalink "3D-Score" utilises two measuring planes, which allows the bullet velocity to be measured, and also allows for automatic detection of cross-shots if a shooter fires on a neighbouring target.

=== Piezoelectric sensors triangulation ===
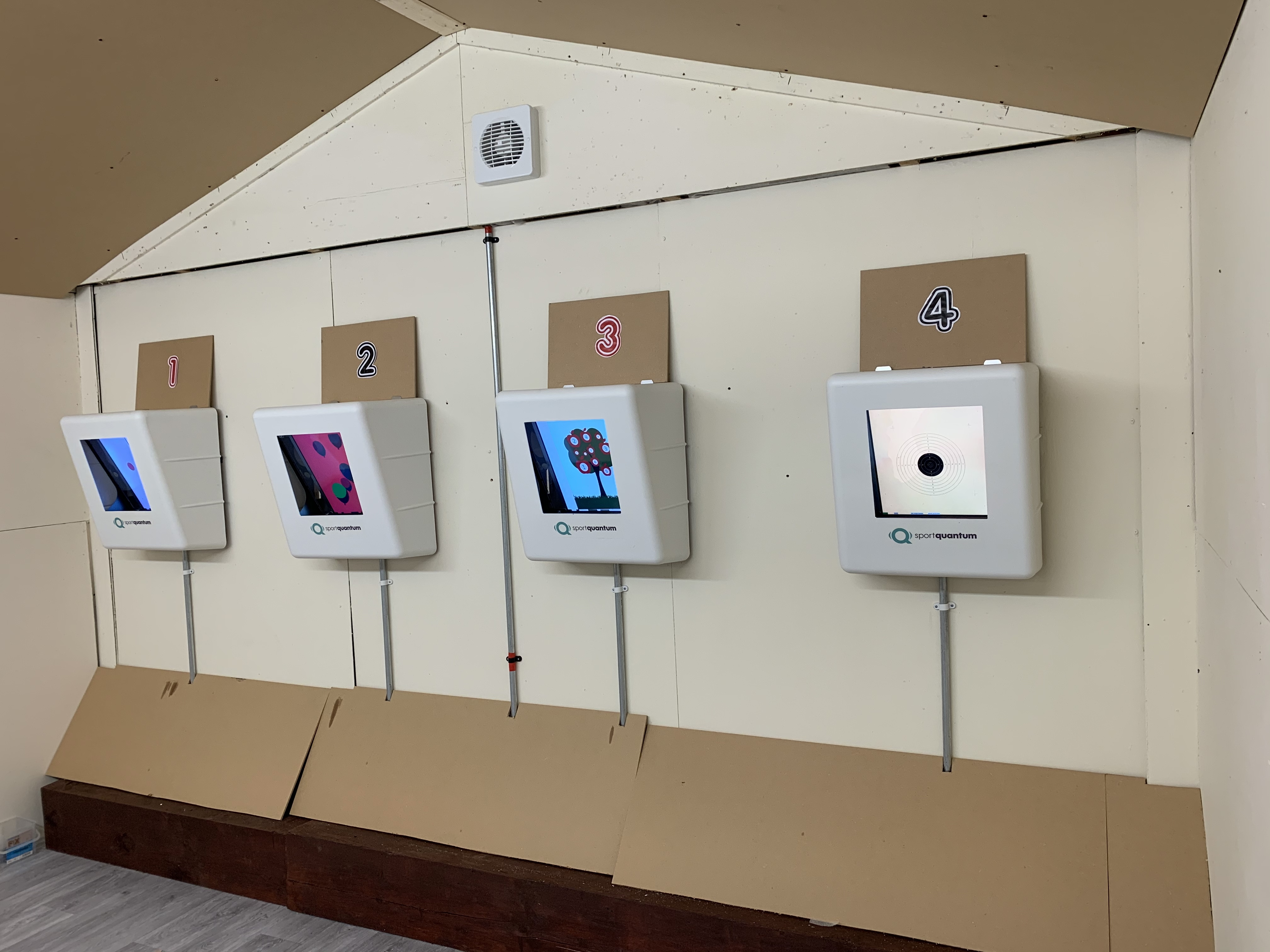
Sport Quantum air gun targets

In 2018, Sport Quantum released an impact measuring technology using piezoelectric sensors on a plate. This enabled new generation interactive shooting targets : plate protected screens for pellets, or armoured still plates for large calibres. Interactive shooting screens combine precise impact measurement and an unlimited choice of targets.

=== Data transmission ===
Data can be transferred either Wirelessly or through cables. Cables are often used for permanent installations, while wireless radio transmissions are used for targets placed provisionally in the field, for running targets or where shooters may fall back to firing points at different distances from fixed targets, as is common when shooting Fullbore target rifle.

== See also ==
- Steel target
