= Shooting range =

Specialized facility designed for firearms practice

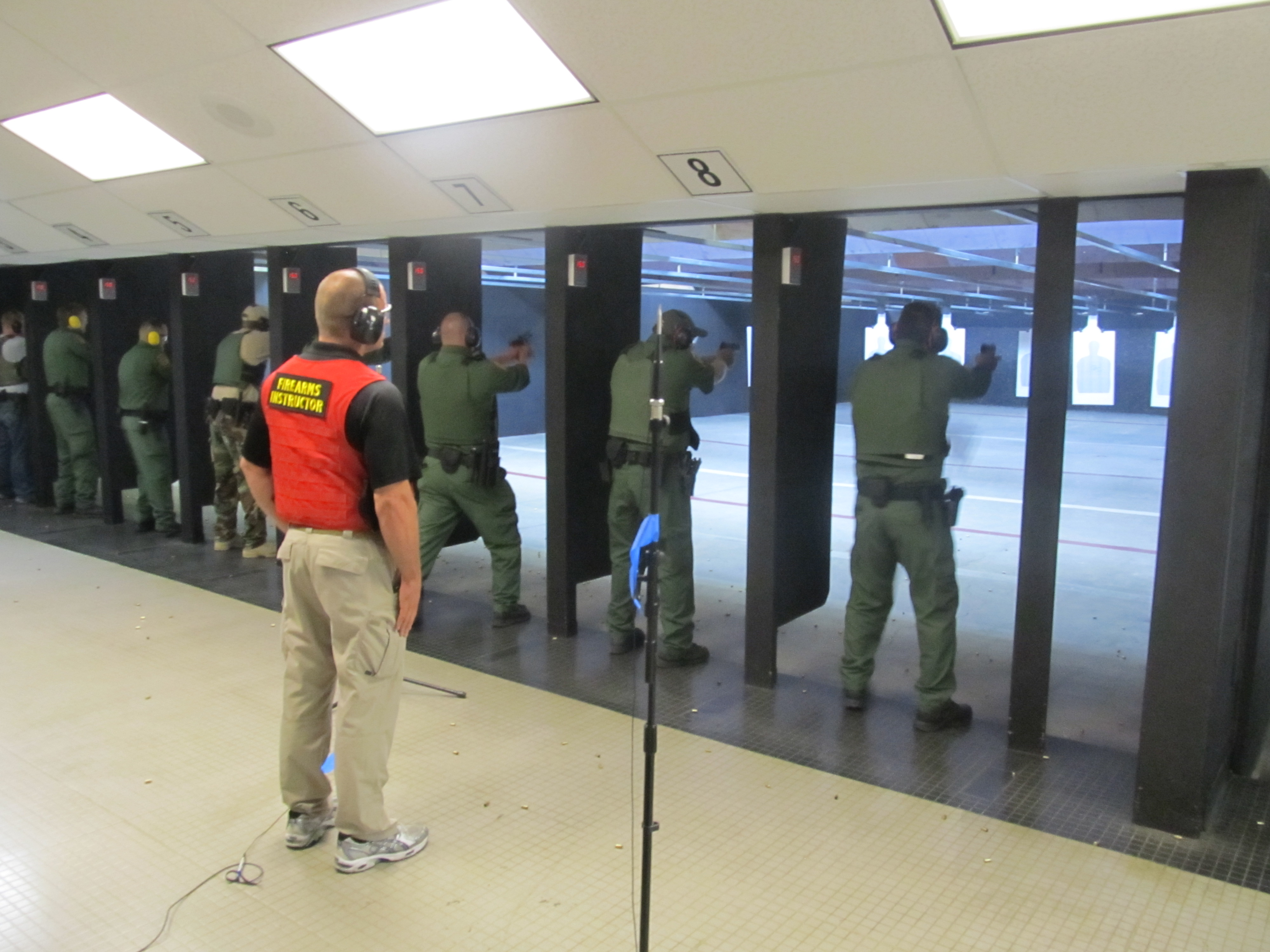
Law enforcement personnel train on an indoor range. A rangemaster is shown supervising.

A shooting range, firing range, gun range or shooting ground is a specialized facility, venue, or field designed specifically for firearm usage qualifications, training, practice, or competitions. Some shooting ranges are operated by military or law enforcement agencies, though the majority of ranges are privately owned by civilians and sporting clubs and cater mostly to recreational shooters. Each facility is typically overseen by one or more supervisory personnel, known as a Range Officer (RO), or sometimes a range master in the United States. Supervisory personnel are responsible for ensuring that all safety rules and relevant laws are followed at all times.

Shooting ranges can be indoor or outdoor, and may be restricted to certain types of firearm that can be used such as handguns or long guns, or they can specialize in certain Olympic disciplines such as trap/skeet shooting or 10 m air pistol/rifle. Most indoor ranges restrict the use of high-power calibers, rifles, or fully automatic firearms.

A shooting gallery is a recreational shooting facility with toy guns (usually very low-power airguns such as BB guns or airsoft guns, occasionally light guns or even water guns), often located within amusement parks, arcades, carnivals or fairgrounds, to provide safe casual games and entertainment for the visiting crowd by prizing customers with various dolls, toys and souvenirs as trophies.

== Type ==
In urban areas, most shooting ranges will be at indoor facilities. Indoor ranges offer sheltering from inclement weather conditions and can be operated around the clock under a controlled environment. Outdoor shooting ranges are typically found away from populated areas due to concerns of safety, noise pollution and soil contamination.

=== Indoor range ===
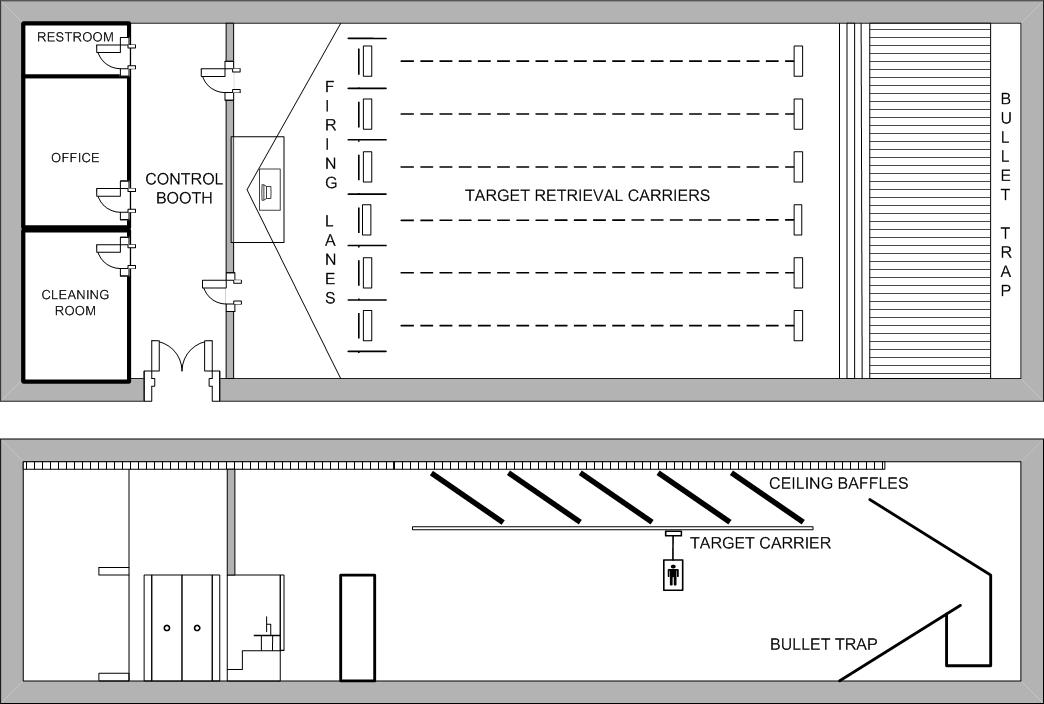
Floor and sectional diagrams of a typical indoor firing range in the United States

Indoor shooting ranges are usually constructed as standalone structures, though they may be housed in larger buildings in isolated areas such as the basement. The basic components of most indoor ranges consist of firing lines/lanes, targets and a bullet trap/"backstop" (which prevents stray shots and overpenetrations). Design considerations may vary depending on planned use but they all must address the basic requirements for operating the range safely, and that is provide ballistic protection, safety controls, proper ventilation, acoustic isolation and appropriate lighting.

==== Structural components ====
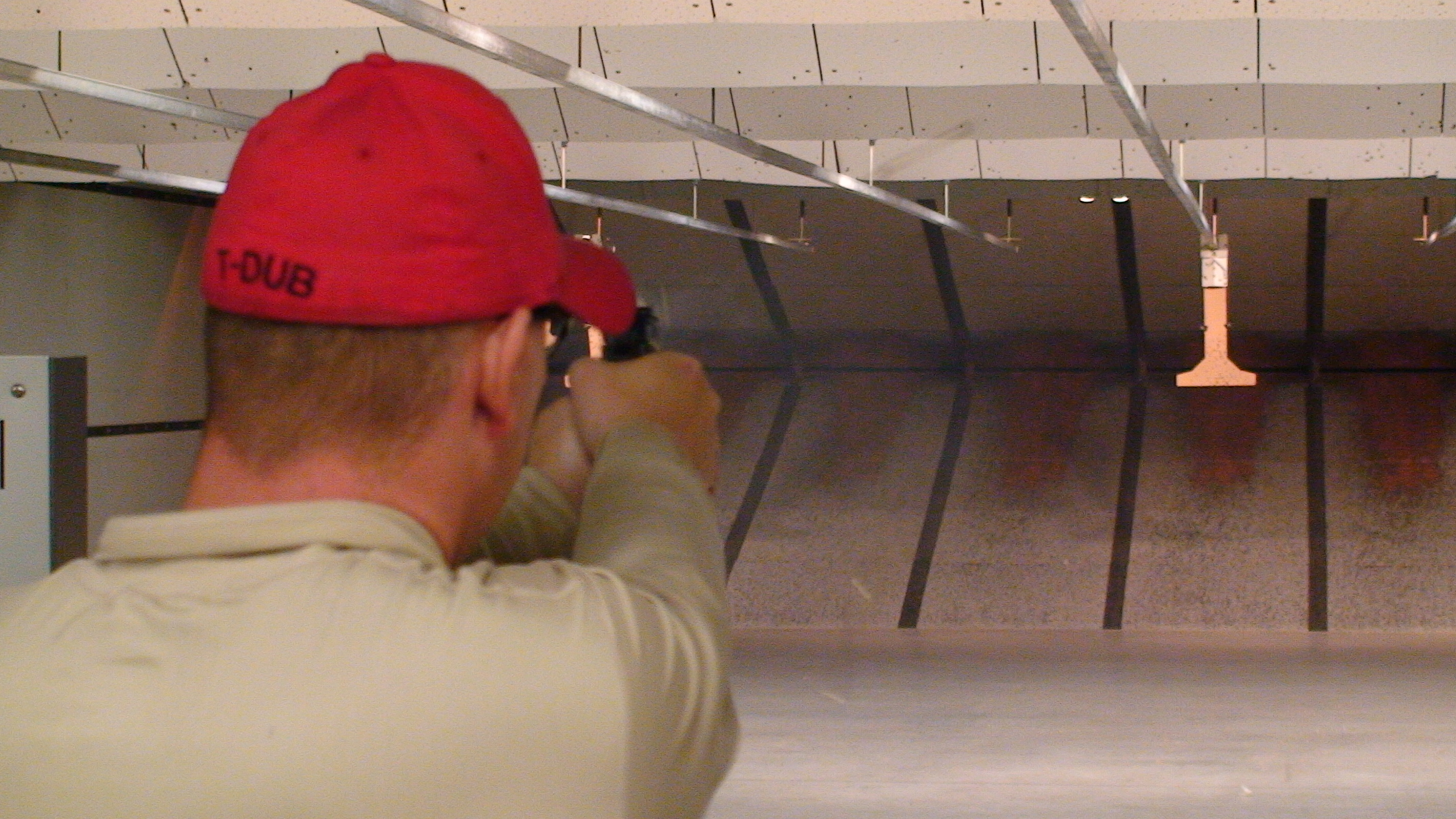
Indoor firing range showing walls, ceiling baffles, and bullet trap

Firing range walls are usually constructed of poured concrete, precast concrete or masonry blocks. The walls must be sufficiently impenetrable and provide adequate ballistic protection from stray shots and back-splatter. Floors are constructed from dense reinforced concrete with a smooth surface finish and are usually slanted slightly from up range (shooter positions) toward the backstops downrange to allow for better maintenance and cleaning.

Indoor range roofs are constructed from steel joists or precast concrete panels with a smooth flat surface that will redirect misfired bullets, facilitate maintenance, and prevent lead buildup. Roof baffles are installed at a 25–30 degree angle to protect ceilings, lighting fixtures, ventilation ducts, and any other unprotected element from stray bullets. Baffles are typically constructed of armored plate steel covered with fire-rated plywood. Deflectors are similar to baffles, but are not usually covered with plywood; they can be installed either vertically or horizontally and are used to redirect stray bullets from unprotected fixtures and elements inside the firing range such as doors, windows, and ventilation registers. Shields are constructed of plate steel and plywood.

The central controls for the firing range equipment, communication, lighting, and security are housed in control rooms or stations. The range master, who is in charge of range operation and management, operates the controls. The control station must provide the range master with an unobstructed line of sight of the firing lanes and all shooters. Control stations are usually constructed of concrete blocks with bulletproof observation windows.

Backstops and bullet traps are used to absorb the energy from the projectile and capture it to prevent overflight beyond the range area. Bullet traps come in a variety of designs and are usually constructed of impenetrable metal plates. The thickness of the plates and the materials used depend on the velocity and energy levels of the projectiles to be fired in the range. The majority of modern bullet traps are made up of angled hardened steel plates that redirect bullets into other metal plates, releasing their energy. The plates must be resistant to penetration, abrasion, and metal fatigue. The traps direct the spent bullets to a collection area in front of the trap or, for high-energy projectiles, at the back of the trap.

Many indoor ranges provide additional spaces such as a cleaning room for weapons, a classroom, restrooms (including shower facilities), office areas, lounge area, or storage and maintenance rooms. Passageways are used to physically isolate the firing range from the adjoining areas.

==== Physical components ====
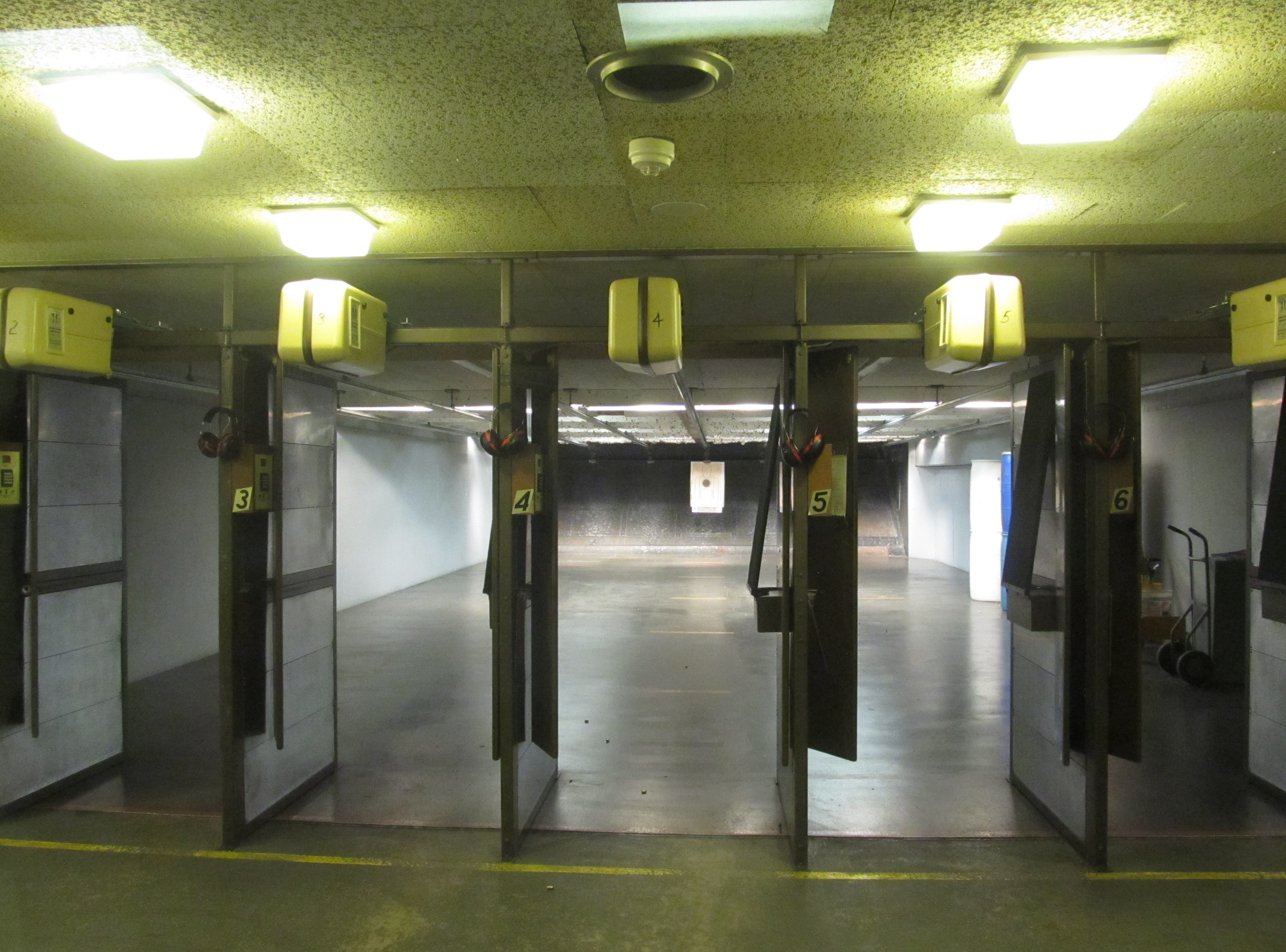
An indoor shooting range with overhead target carriers

Some shooting ranges are equipped with shooting booths to provide shooters with a defined private area and to reduce potential hazard from misfires and prevent ejected cartridge cases from hitting/distracting adjacent shooters. Shooting booths are made of partitions or panels which can be acoustically treated to reduce the unpleasant effects of noise on surrounding bystanders. The booths are sometimes equipped with communication or target-operation equipment; target or booth lighting controls; shelves for holding weapons and bullets, or to prevent shooters from going downrange; and equipment for practicing shooting from behind a barrier. The firing line, usually marked red or orange, runs along the downrange edge of the shooting booths. Some ranges have motion detectors that can set off an alarm when a shooter passes this line during shooting.

Target systems consist of a target object and optionally a target carrier system and a target control system. Some ranges utilise electronic scoring systems which do not require paper targets to be placed downrange. Targets for indoor ranges are usually a paper sheet or piece of corrugated cardboard with a printed image, either a bullseye or a silhouette.

Target carrier systems allow a range to operate more efficiently and safely by transporting targets between the firing line and the target line, so the shooter does not have to wait for a "ceasefire" and physically walk downrange to examine and set up the target. This is particularly useful on commercial and "self service" ranges. The target control system allows the range master to control the operation and movement of the targets through a central control station in the control booth. Some ranges provide local control modules that can be operated in the shooting booths. Many smaller clubs or competition ranges may not bother with target carriers as shooters fire in timed details anyway, and match targets will be collected for scoring at the end of each detail. Electronic scoring systems are increasingly common on such ranges, which eliminate paper targets and manual scoring.

==== Operational components ====
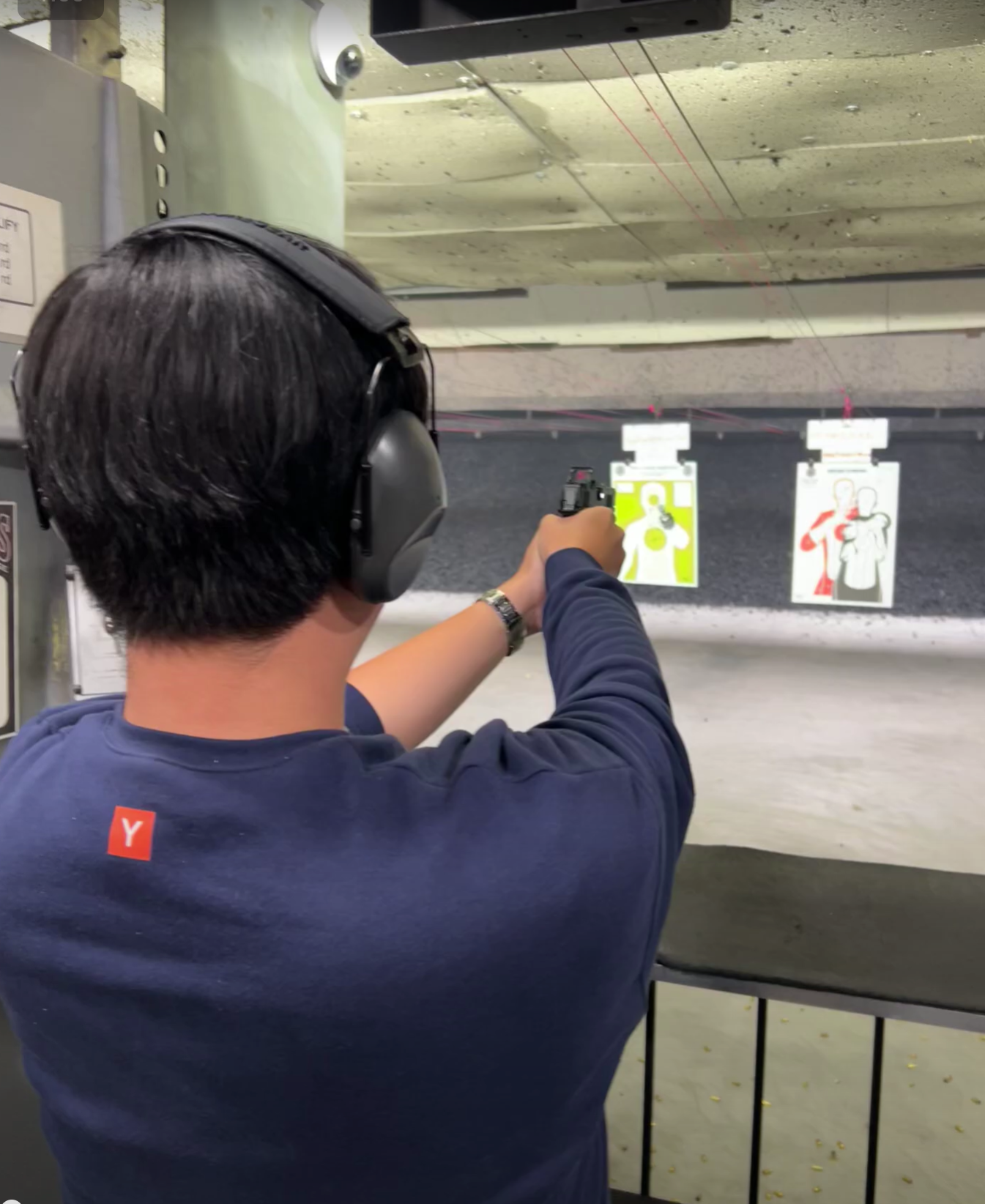
A person practicing with a handgun at an indoor shooting range, wearing hearing protection and aiming at paper silhouette targets, 2025.

A critical component in the design and proper operation of an indoor ranges is the ventilation system. Proper ventilation reduces shooters' exposure to airborne lead particles and other combustion byproducts. Ventilation systems consist of supply and exhaust air systems and associated ductwork. Supply air can be provided through a perforated wall plenum or radial air diffusers mounted at ceiling height. Airflow along the firing line should be no more than 0.38 m/s (75 feet per minute, fpm) with a minimum acceptable flow of 0.25 m/s (50 fpm). Air is typically exhausted at or behind the bullet trap. Some firing ranges are designed to have multiple exhaust points downrange to maintain downrange flow and desired velocities at the firing line. The exhaust system should be designed to provide minimum duct air velocities of 12.70 – 15.24 m/s (2,500 – 3,000 fpm). The equipment and designs for the ventilation systems are varied, most firing ranges have one supply and one exhaust fan, however, some have multiple supply or exhaust fans. Very often, the air-flow rate required by the firing range and space constraints for the fans dictate the number and types of fans. Most firing ranges have systems that supply 100% outside air to the firing range and exhaust all of the air to outside the building; but, some firing range ventilation systems are designed to recirculate some of the exhaust air to the supply air system to conserve energy especially in extreme climates. The exhaust air is always filtered before being exhausted outside the building or recirculated to the supply system.

Lighting in the range consists of control booth, uprange area, shooting booth, and downrange lighting systems. Control booth lighting is usually manually controlled and consists of general lighting and low-level lighting used during particular shooting conditions. Lighting uprange of the booths is general ceiling-level lighting and can usually be controlled manually or from the central controls. Lights downrange of the firing line are usually spotlights used to illuminate the targets at various distances downrange of the booths.

Safety control systems are installed to protect the shooters during range malfunction or emergency situations. Such systems may include warning lights, alarm bells, and air-flow and filtration monitors.

==== Airgun ranges ====
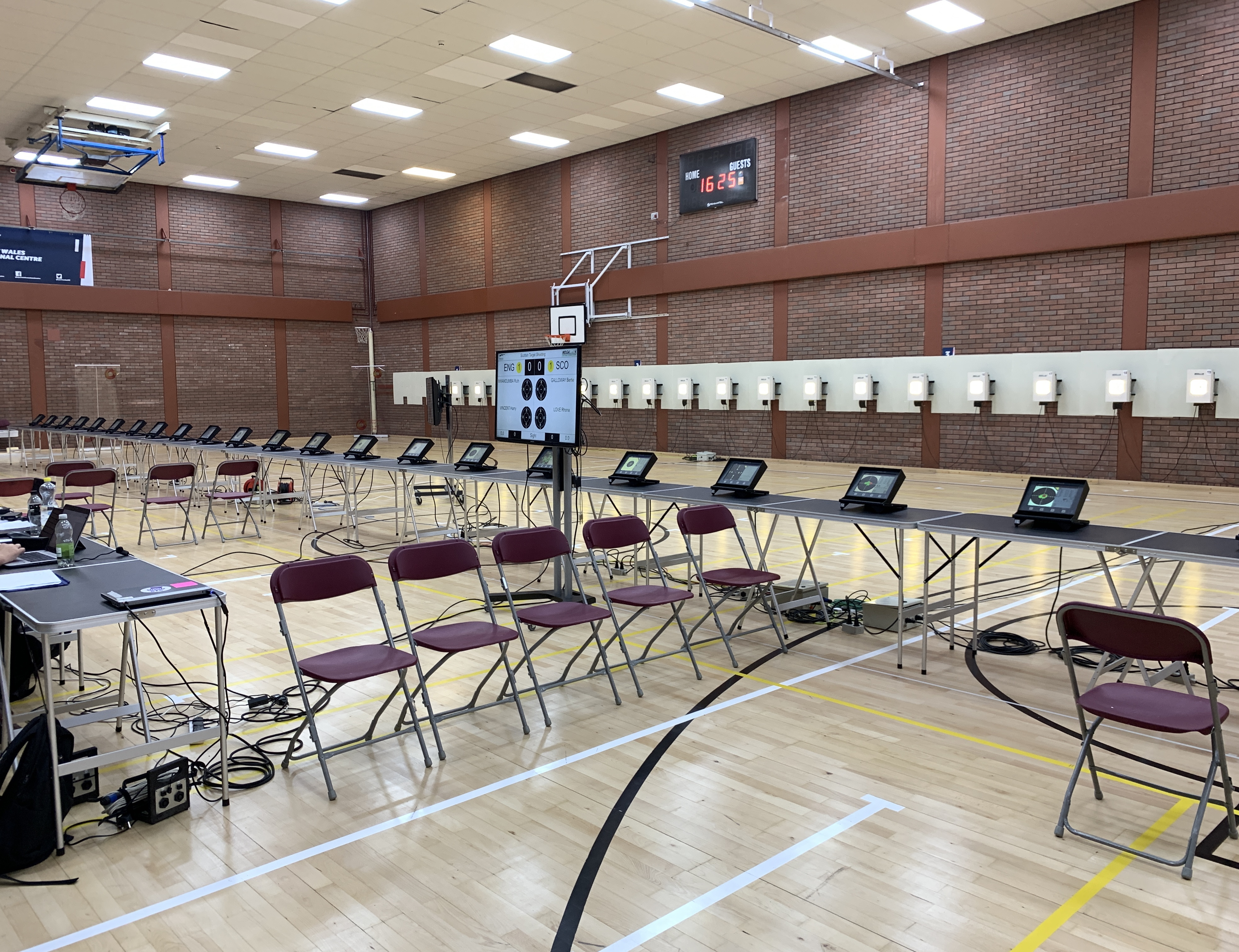
Temporary 10metre range for the 2022 CSF(ED) Championships in a Cardiff sports hall.

Due to the lower power of most airguns, it is often possible to operate airgun ranges safely in multi-use and improvised spaces. This is particularly true of ISSF-oriented airguns which are limited to muzzle energies of 6ft-lb.

Suitable ranges can be set up in sports halls or function rooms, using simple wooden backers, pellet catchers or lightweight ballistic curtains to protect the wall behind. Although safe handling practices for lead pellets must be followed, the lack of combustion gases negates the need for the high-performance ventilation systems required on conventional indoor ranges. Such arrangements are particularly common for major championships. Few locations could justify the expense of maintaining a permanent range with 80+ firing lanes, but such a range can be set up temporarily in large sports halls or exhibition centres. This is the approach taken by major European events such as InterShoot, RIAC and the Welsh Airgun Championships.

=== Outdoor range ===
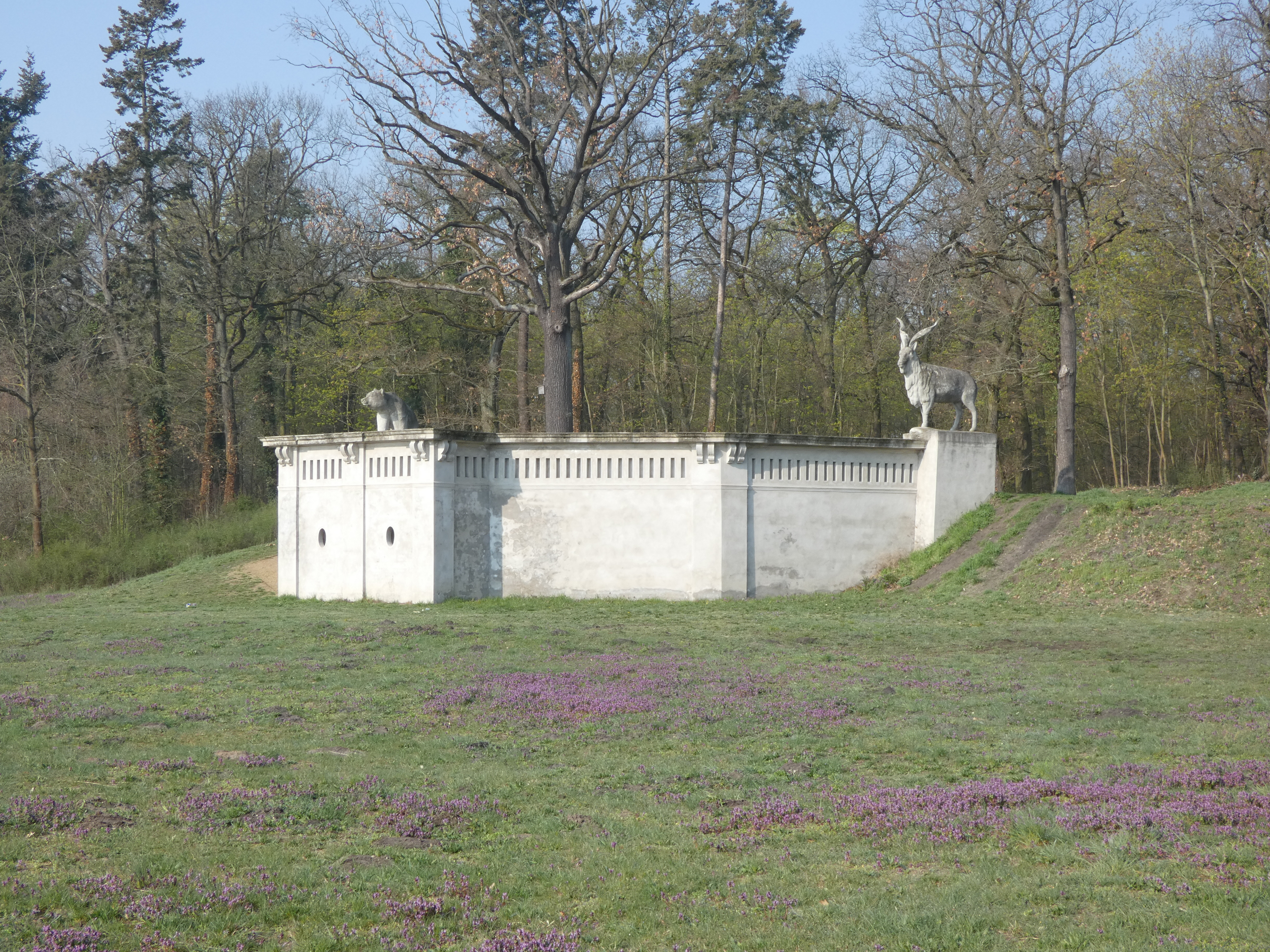
Clay pigeon shooting stand of 1900 at Plaue Castle (Germany)

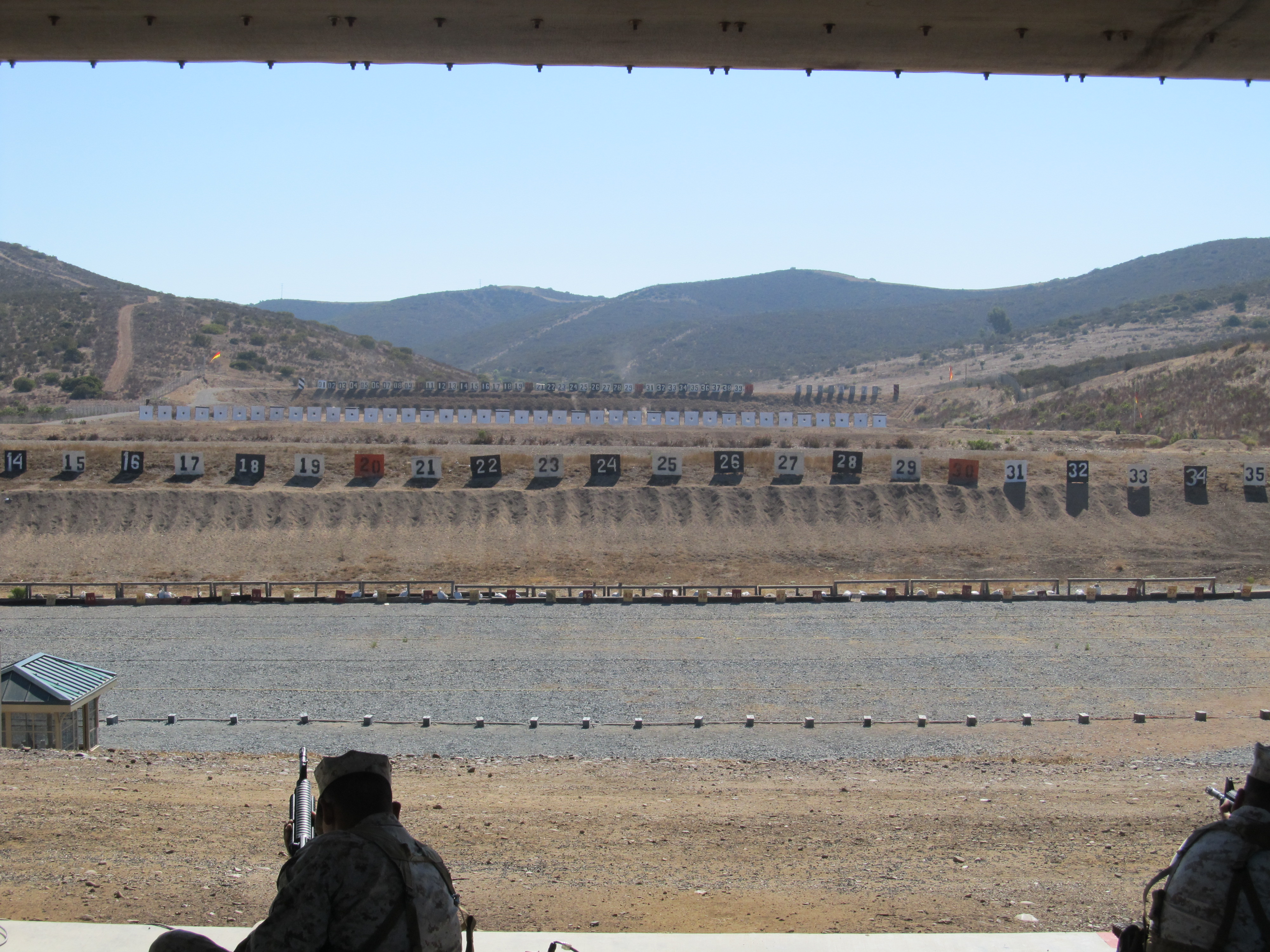
Outdoor firing range

Outdoor shooting ranges are used for longer-distance shooting up to or exceeding 1,200 yards (1,100 m). Training might also specifically require exposure to the elements such as wind, dust and rain. Outdoor competition shooting is preferred under benign weather conditions, although conditions may change, competition is only abandoned when safety becomes an issue.

Outdoor ranges are designed to contain all fired shots. This necessitates a high retaining wall behind the target line called a backstop or stop-butt, comprising an earth mound, sandbag barrier or specially designed funnel-shaped traps to catch and prevent misaligned shots, errant projectile ricochets, or shots going beyond the bounds of the shooting range. Most outdoor ranges restrict the maximum caliber size and/or projectile energy based on the design specification of the range. Some target-shooting ranges have separate facilities devoted to the use of higher-powered firearms such as .50 caliber.

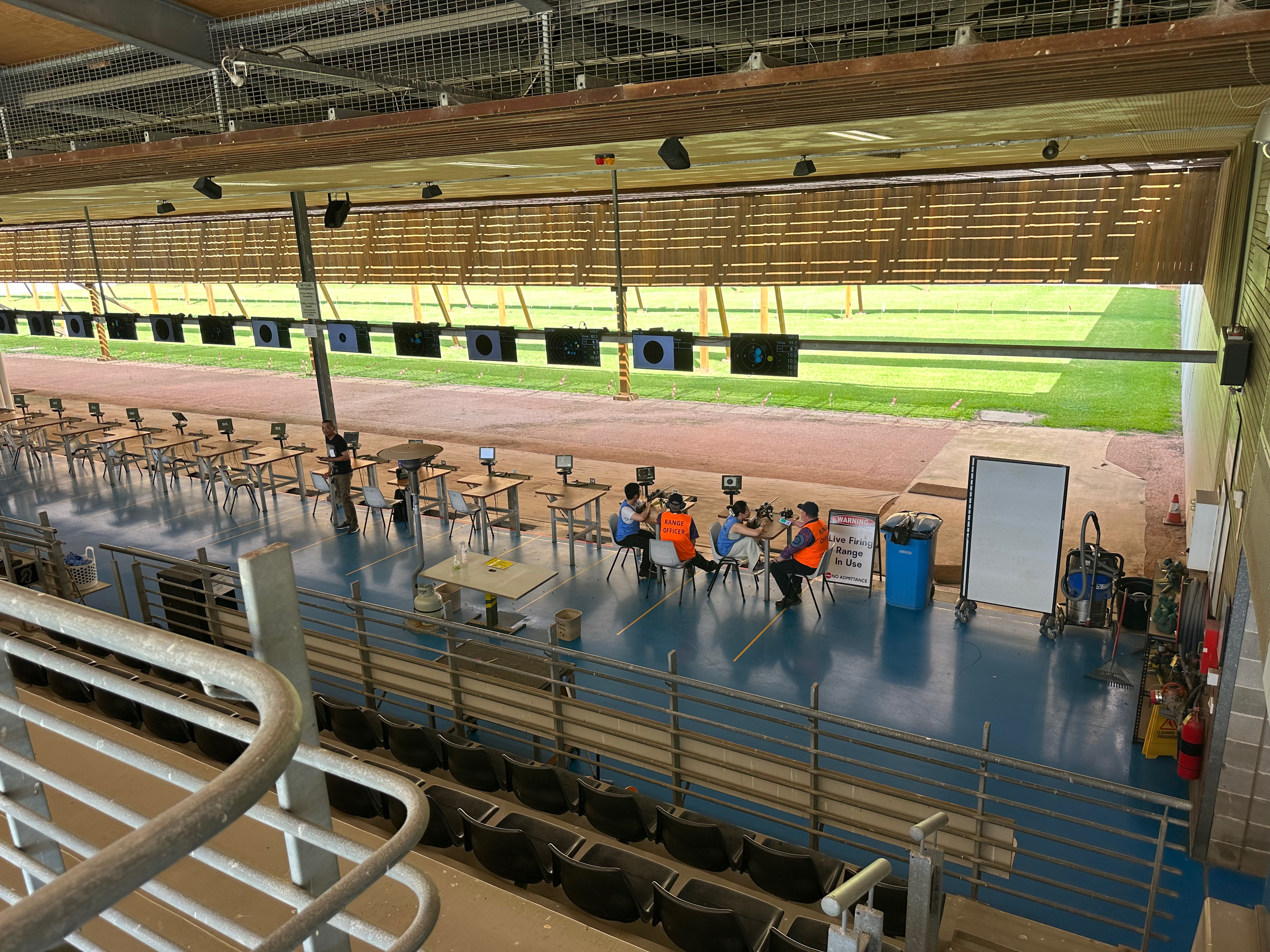
Protected firing point at Sydney International Shooting Centre, built for the 2000 Summer Olympic Games

Outdoor ranges may be partially enclosed and so have some features in common with indoor ranges, for example the British Armed Forces barrack range has a roofed firing point and normally has 360° walls. As its name suggests, it is generally found in military bases rather than in the more remote areas common to outdoor ranges. Outdoor ranges for ISSF and Olympic shooting events often have heavily sheltered firing points to protect athletes, spectators and media from inclement weather as well as housing the sophisticated electronic target systems.

Several studies of outdoor ranges have shown that prolonged exposure to lead and noise can cause health problems, particularly among employees and instructors.

Due to their larger area and more "open air" nature, outdoor ranges need less cleaning and maintenance than indoor ranges. However, despite the natural ventilation of outdoor firing ranges, some outdoor ranges have ballistic baffles overhead, and concrete walls and structures on the sides that can cause the air to stagnate and lead to increases in exposure to lead and noise.

Consequently, operators of outdoor ranges might consider adding sound transmission barriers, absorptive materials, and natural vegetation to lessen noise emission. Fans pointing downrange can provide air movement away from shooters to lessen lead exposure.

Air rifle
Outdoor air rifle ranges can have a fixed distance such as 10 metres (11 yd) or 25 metres (27 yd) or be an area for the practice of the sport of field target shooting, where reset metal targets are placed in natural surroundings at various distances and elevations, with a pellet trap behind the target.

Small-bore rifle

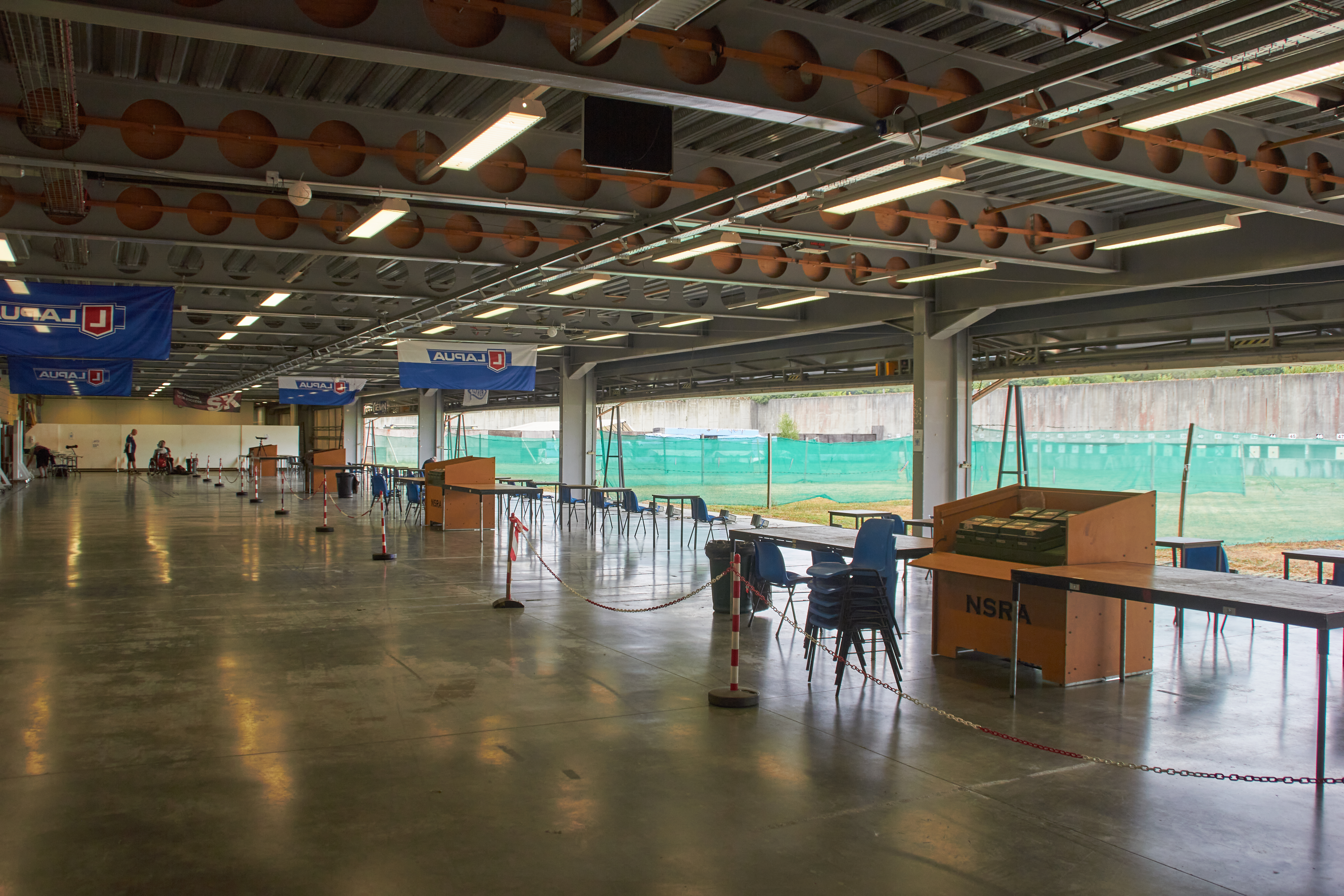
NSRA's Malcolm Cooper 50 Metre Range on Bisley Camp, UK

Small-bore (.22 Long Rifle caliber) rifle ranges are typically 50 metres (55 yd) to accommodate the Olympic 50 m Rifle event, but they can extend to 200 metres (219 yd). These ranges are found around the world as part of various cadet shooting programs, sometimes reduced to 25 metres (27 yd), or in American parlance "the thousand-inch range". Often called "miniature rifle ranges", they featured as training establishments for initial military marksmanship training using lower-cost ammunition imparting less recoil or for entertainment carnival games.

Full-bore rifle
Target shooting range for larger-caliber centerfire rifles are no shorter than 100 metres (109 yd), except in the case of "Zero" ranges used for setting or checking the zero of sights using special "ladder" targets. "Zero". Military ranges are typically at least 500–1,000 metres (547–1,094 yd) to safely accommodate the range of most rifles. Public ranges can be as long as 2,000 yards (1,829 m) and typically accommodate hunters and sportsman participating in sports such as 300 m Standard Rifle, metallic silhouette or benchrest shooting.

Shotgun

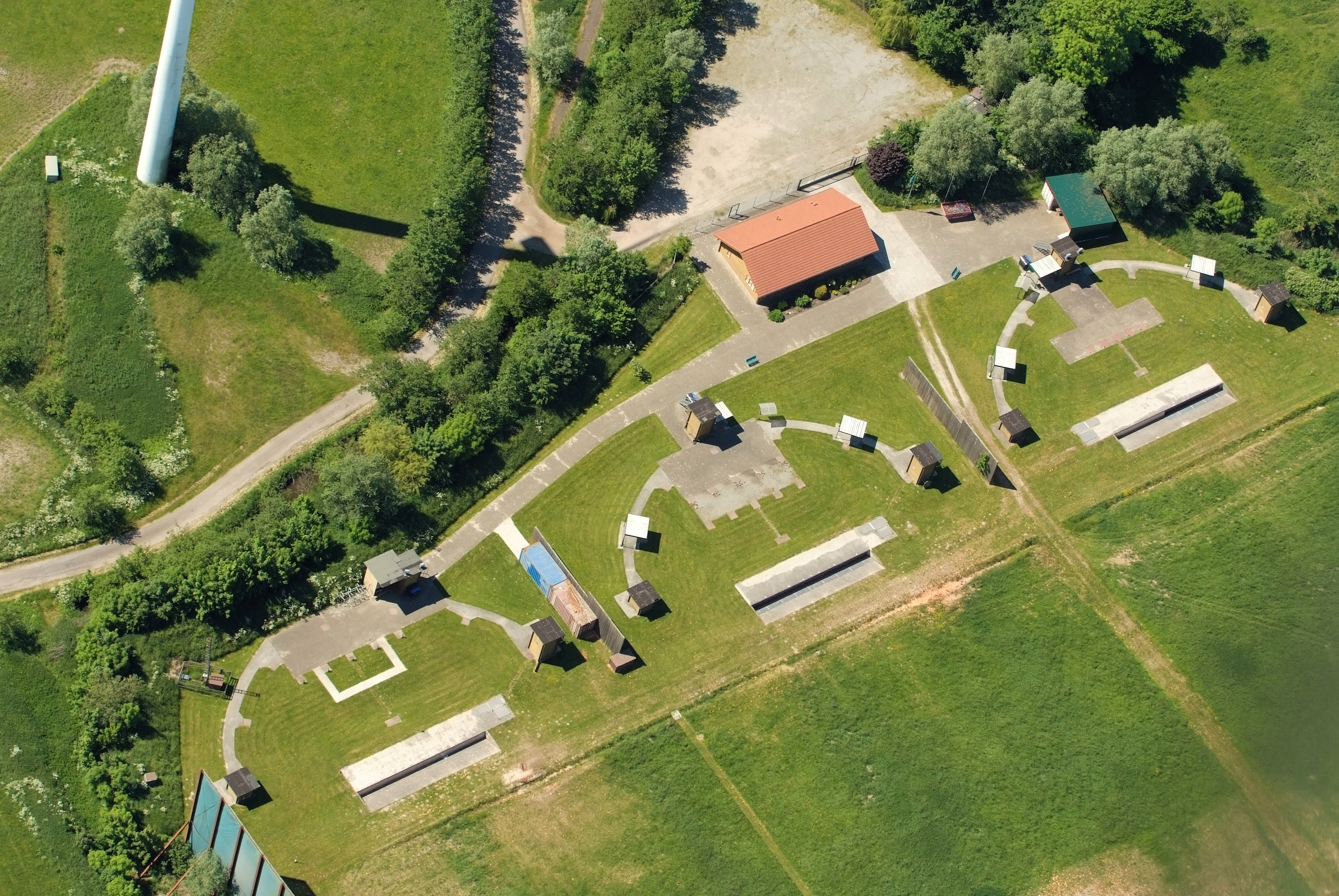
Clay pigeon layouts for Skeet and Trap shooting

Specialist ranges cater for various clay pigeon shooting events and require special layouts and equipment.

=== Archery ranges ===
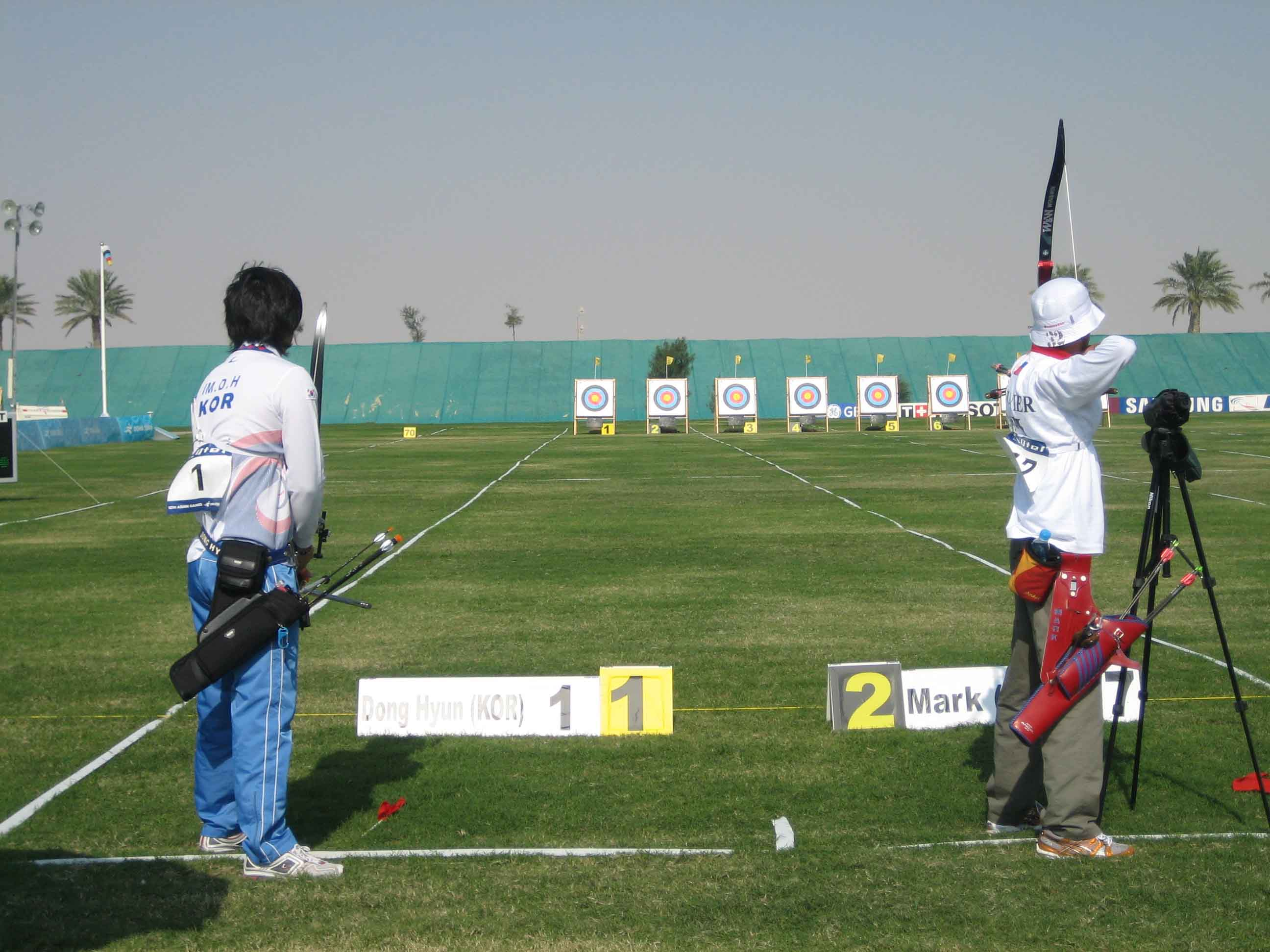
Archery range in Doha, Qatar

Oftentimes the same range is made available to both bow and gun shooters. However, there are many ranges that have been made available exclusively for archers, which lack the backstop to safely contain bullets The most popular types of archery ranges include 3-D ranges, field ranges and indoor ranges.

== Components ==
=== Firing point ===
The firing point normally is at a defined point on the ground, and on a civilian range will usually be level and flat. Outdoor ranges without a covered firing point are usually grass, often on a slightly raised, flattened mound. Outdoor ranges with a covered firing point are usually concrete or tarmacadam. Outdoor military range firing points are not usually covered and may have other configurations, e.g., sloping, a gravel base or hole in the ground.

A "fixed firing point" or echelon rifle range is where the targets are located at the various distances with the marksman or woman shooting from the one firing point. The most advanced rifle range of this design was constructed for the Commonwealth Games New Delhi 2010.

The firing point cover can be as simple as a tent, to a frame with only a roof (to keep off rain or sunshine) to a substantial building with appropriate apertures to shoot through.

=== Targets ===
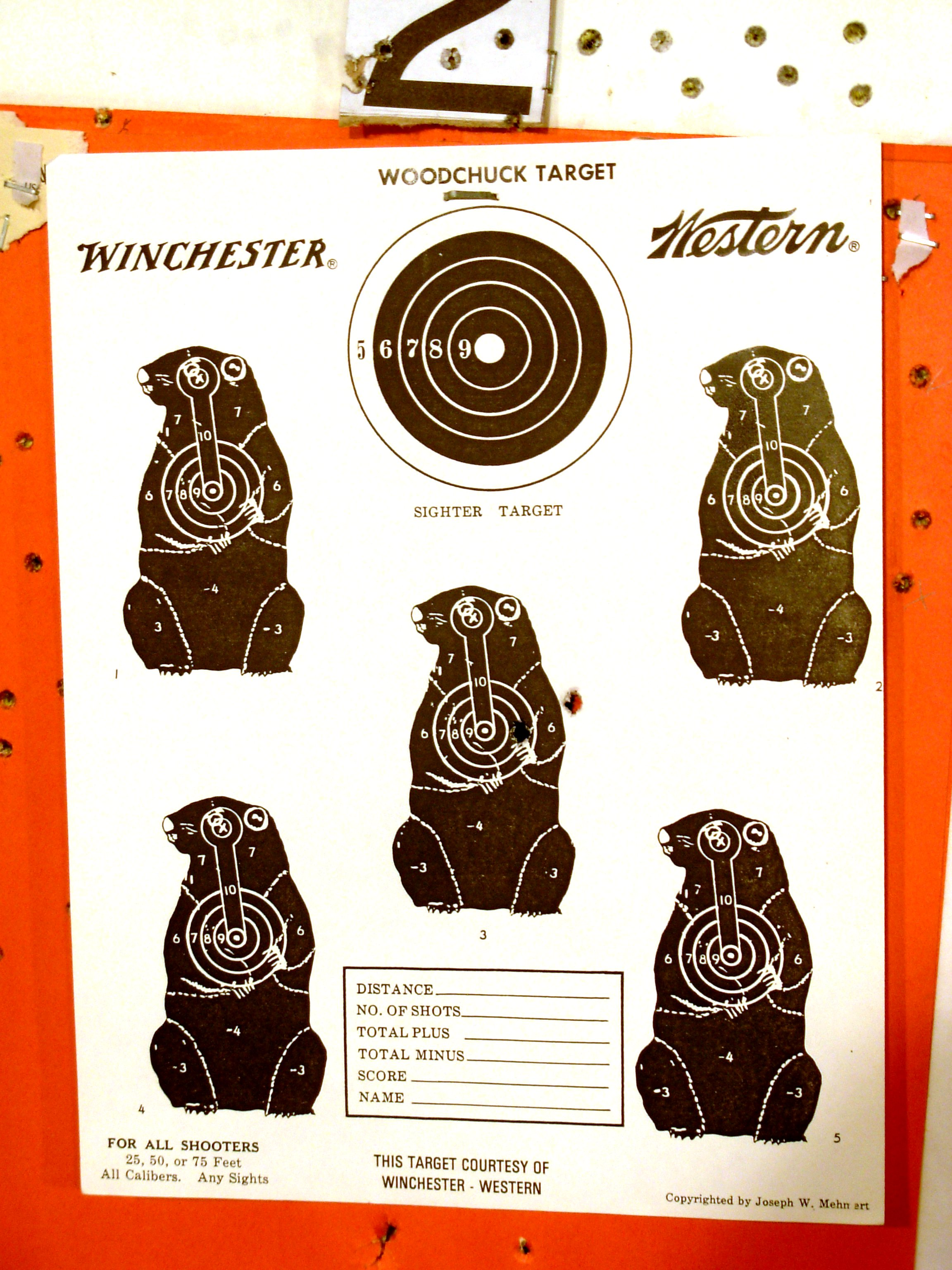
Shooting targets for woodchuck hunting

Civilian targets are usually made of paper or a plastic coreflute, sometimes with a canvas or hessian back on the larger long-range types. Most competitive targets are a solid black circle on a white background. The black circle may have scoring rings. Targets of other shapes may be used such as used in pistol (hand gun) target shooting. Reactive targets allow shooters to easily identify bullet strikes. This allows shooters to improve their skills by quickly being able to compare their aiming point and where the actual bullet impacted the target.

Electronic scoring targets use an acoustic or optical system to evaluate the shot as it passes through the target frame.

Service rifle competitions typically use the military-standard targets contemporary to the firearm's era. The same applies for the matches they shoot.

Other target types include a metal plate that is knocked over by the projectile such as in the air rifle sport of field target or handgun discipline of IPSC, and stationary metal plates of scaled animal outlines on which bullet strikes mark as well as those that mark the paint which is painted over again after scoring.

=== Butts / backstop ===
The butts or backstop is the area behind the target into which the shot impacts having passed through the target. Earth, sand, or rubber berms are common, particularly on outdoor ranges. Vertical or angled steel plates with collectors are common indoors, often with a ballistic rubber curtain through which the bullet passes and is then stopped by a metal plate. The rubber curtains help reduce ricochet or bounce-back of bullet fragments.

Ranges without automatic target placements sometimes have galleries or trenches from where personnel lift and retract, mark and replace targets.

Backstops need to be of sufficient height to capture the projectile intended for the target as well as any ricochet that may occur from the projectile striking the range floor. The height is determined by range distance, as well as the approved firearms - a range for unsupported or pistol shooting may require a larger backstop than a range exclusively used or prone or supported rifle where a greater level of accuracy is expected.

=== Wind flags ===
Outdoor shooting ranges sometimes have wind flags, positioned between the firing line (where the shooters are) and the targets. Shooters observe these flags to make an estimate of wind speed, which is then converted into lateral minute of angle point of aim corrections or, alternatively, windage holdoff corrections.

The flag method is the most common method used to estimate wind speed. A flag blowing in the wind will naturally blow away from the flagpole, with the angle of the bottom of the flag to the flagpole increasing with increasing windspeed. To estimate the wind speed in mph, the angle in degrees between the bottom of the flag to the flagpole at the mid-range position between the shooter and the target is divided by 4. For example, an angle of 60 degrees between the bottom of a flag and a flagpole would be estimated as a 15 miles per hour (24 km/h) windspeed.

The clock method is then used to determine full value, half value, or no value corrections in a minute of angle for this wind. Aligning the target at the 12 o'clock position or direction, with the 6 o'clock direction being directly behind the shooter, winds at 3 or 9 o'clock are equated to full value, winds at 1, 2, 4, 5, 7, 8, 10, 11 o'clock are equated to half value, and winds at 12 and 6 o'clock are equated to no value.

The minute of angle correction (full value) is then commonly estimated as ((Range [meters] / 100) × Wind [mph]) / C, where C is a constant. The constant C equals 15 for ranges from 100 to 500 meters, 14 for 600 meters, 13 for 700–800 meters, 12 for 900 meters, and 11 for 1,000 meters.

For full-value winds, this full windage correction is used. For half-value winds, the minute of correction in windage given by this formula is halved; for no-value winds, no minute of angle correction in windage is required.

Multiple flags are required for two reasons. First, the wind speed closest to the midpoint of the range has the greatest effect on the projectile. In addition, the wind at one part of the range will not always be the same at another part.

Wind flags are not always actual flags, sometimes streamers are used, small triangle flags, or even pinwheels. Factors such as the range length and expected strength of the wind determine the best type of flag to use. When no flags are available, a small leaf or another small light object can be dropped from shoulder height, and the object is then pointed at by the shooter; the angle between his arm and his torso can provide an equivalent wind speed estimation as a wind flag, although it will not be at the mid-range location along the bullet's trajectory.

=== Lighting ===
Lighting should be consistent in intensity, glare-free, and shadow-free. The shooter's vision down range should not be obstructed by lighting behind the firing line. The illumination should be bright enough to prevent pupil dilation, which lowers the shooter's visual acuity. Emergency lights for egress, "Range in Use" signs at the entrance, and exit lights are among the other lighting options. During repairs or cleaning, the lighting behind the bullet trap should be at least 30 foot-candles.

== Common safety practices ==
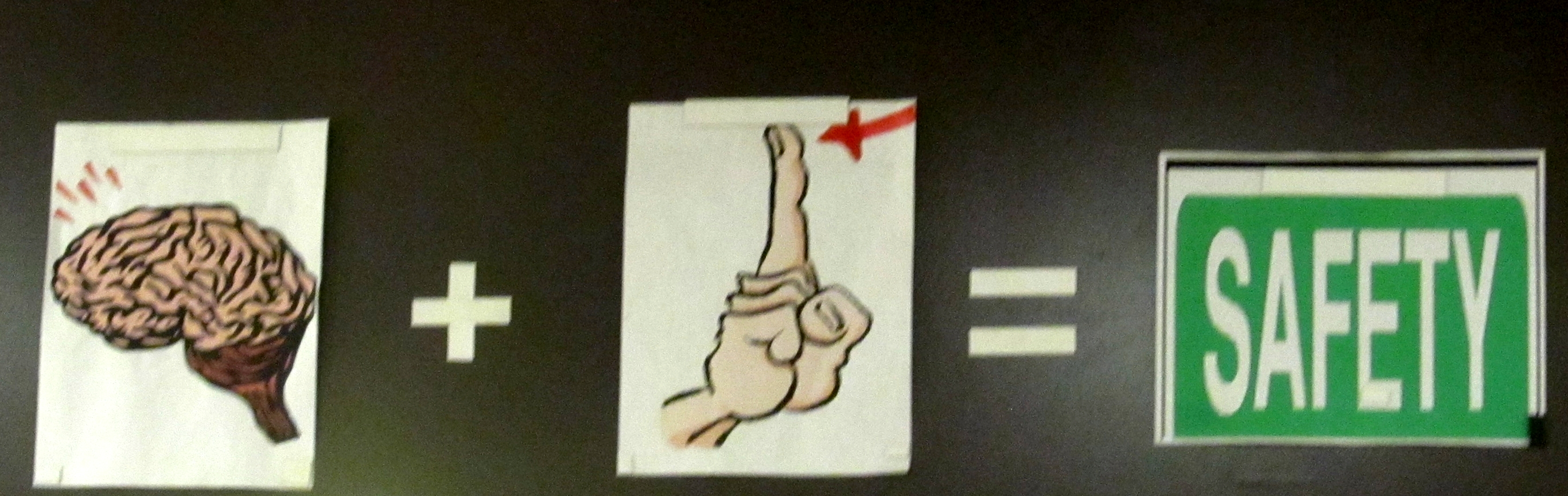
Very important, highly visible safety practices at a shooting range.

Although some ranges require all weapons to be discharged, securely encased, and/or trigger-locked before entering or exiting the facility, others do not. Many jurisdictions have no such restrictions, regardless of whether one has a concealed carry license in jurisdictions where concealed carry is legal.

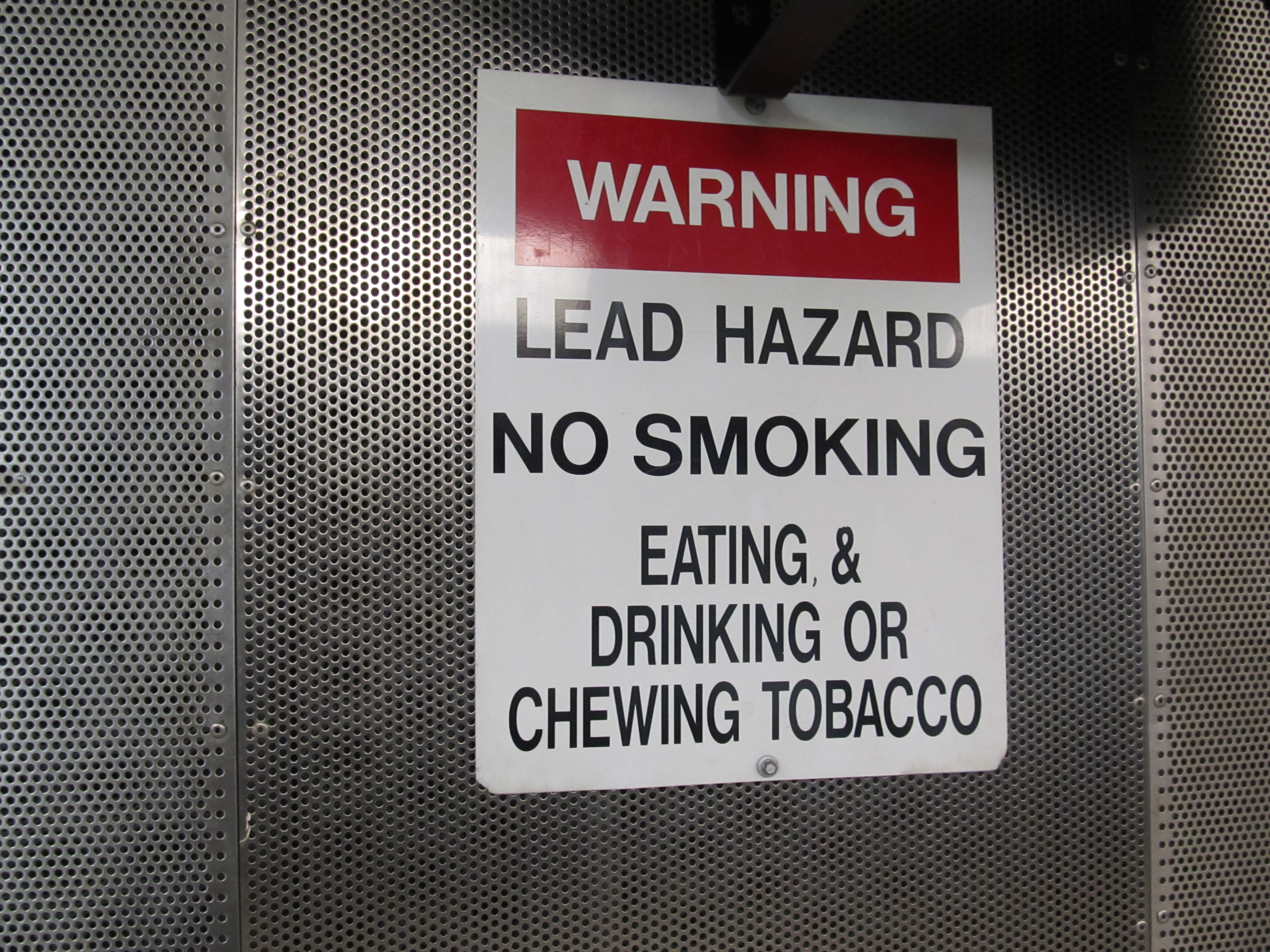
Warning sign posted inside an indoor firing range to alert shooters and instructors about the potential for lead poisoning

Whether indoors or outdoors, all shooters are typically required to wear eye protection as well as hearing protection (ear muffs or earplugs) at all times when within the defined boundaries of the range. Employees and users are exposed to lead dust from bullets or cartridge primers, which can be inhaled or can settle on skin or clothing. Additionally, the discharging of firearms in indoor ranges can produce noise levels of over 140 dB sound pressure level. To combat this, it is commonly recommended that those inside the range "double-up" ear protection by using both earplugs and over-the-head earmuffs, and to protect range bystanders from sound exposure. Depending on the range, prescription eyeglasses may qualify as eye protection. Indoor ranges can be particularly unsafe, due to high lead exposures and increased noise exposures where the design or management is not of a quality conducive to best practice.

The National Institute for Occupational Safety and Health issued an Alert, that presents five case reports documenting lead and noise exposures, and examines firing range operations, exposure assessment and control methods, existing regulations, and exposure standards and guidelines. More information about reducing occupational exposures at indoor firing ranges can be found at NIOSH Firing Range topic page

In 2013, The American National Academy of Sciences published a report highlighting the shortcomings of current occupational lead exposure standards and urged the United States Department of Defense to update its guidelines and practices for protecting workers from lead exposure on firing ranges.

=== Air ===
Shooting ranges carry a risk of lead poisoning and are a public health concern

Lead and other pollutants are regulated by ventilation in a range. The configuration of the supply and exhaust air systems is critical for proper operation. Interlocks that enable both the supply and exhaust fans to be working should be designed to ensure proper operation. The range's exhaust system eliminates dirty air. The air velocity down the range is determined by the exhaust flow rate, but it has no bearing on the airflow pattern at the firing line. A minor negative pressure in the range can be maintained by exhausting 3 to 7% more air than is supplied. The negative pressure of -0.04 + 0.02 inches water gauge should be maintained for ranges. Energy recovery systems should be considered because of the huge amount of air being exhausted. Single-speed fans, not multiple-speed fans, should be used. To demonstrate proper exhaust system function, indicators (static or velocity pressure) for flow monitoring are a good idea.

Outside air must make up for the lost airflow. The distribution of supply air is crucial in assessing the ventilation system's effectiveness. Air supply systems are designed to spread air equally over the firing range's distance. Airflow at the shooting line can be unstable if it is not uniformly dispersed, allowing lead and other pollutants to be brought back into the shooter's breathing region. Supply air should be added as high as possible in the range.

=== Cleaning ===
Due to the health risks of accumulated lead dust and combustion products, cleaning floors and horizontal surfaces on a regular basis is recommended, either explicitly or as an implementation of more general health and safety regulations for handling lead. The level of cleaning is determined by how often the range is used. Wet methods or a vacuum fitted with a high-performance particulate air (HEPA) filter may be used to clean. The risk of unburned powder accumulating necessitates the use of an explosion-proof HEPA vacuum.

During cleanup, the ventilation system should be turned on. Personnel and shooters should be aware of the areas of the range to which they are permitted entry, as well as the areas where their clothing or skin may become contaminated. Shooters should not be permitted to proceed beyond the firing line. Individuals who might need to walk down the range should have disposable shoe coverings accessible. Before consuming food, drinks, or other products, shooters should thoroughly wash their hands and face.

=== Safety Areas ===
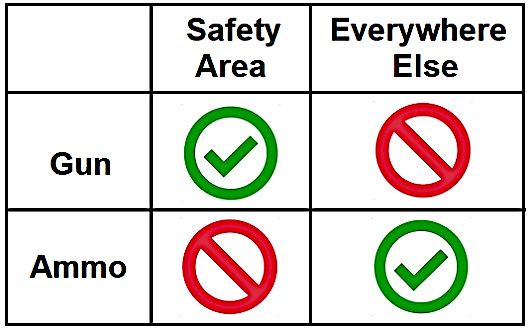
Security area procedures chart.

In practical shooting sports, a Safety Area is a bay where shooters can handle unloaded firearms without the supervision of a range officer. Safety areas are used in dynamic shooting sport disciplines (e.g. IPSC, PPC 1500, Steel Challenge). They may be used to pack, unpack or holster firearms, cleaning or repair, dry fire or train with empty magazines.

The Safety Area will have a designated safe direction in which shooters can point the muzzle of their firearm.

The handling of ammunition is expressly prohibited within the safety area, including any dummy rounds. Outside the safety area ammunition can be handled freely to load magazines, but firearms may only be handled under the direct supervision of a Range Officer. This strict separation of firearms and ammunition prevents accidental or negligent discharges.

==== Other uses of "Safety Area" ====
The phrase "safety area" is generic and can have different meanings in other shooting sport disciplines, or defined in local range standing orders.

Of note is the US Military concept of a Small Arms Range Safety Area (SARSA). SARSAs are areas established to contain small arms activity that could be hazardous to non-participating aircraft. They define dates, boundaries and altitudes to be coordinated with local air traffic control.

== Specific countries ==
This article discusses shooting or firing ranges in a general sense. For more specific discussion of shooting ranges in specific countries, see:

- Shooting ranges in Switzerland

== See also ==
- ISSF shooting events (Olympic events)
- Kill house
- Metallic silhouette
- Schützenverein
- Shooting sports
- Sport venue
