= Duel shooting =

Duel shooting or dueling shooting can refer to:

- IPSC Shoot-Off, a knockout tournament in practical shooting contested with pistol, rifle or shotgun
- ISSF 25 meter rapid fire pistol, a part of the Olympic program since 1896, where rules changed greatly before World War II, and then only slightly changed until two major revisions in 1989 and 2005
  - Men's 30 metre dueling pistol at the 1912 Summer Olympics, originally called "individual competition with revolver and pistol (duel shooting)", the forerunner of the current ISSF men's 25 meter rapid fire pistol
- ISSF 25 meter center-fire pistol, a pistol competition which consists of a precision stage and a rapid-fire stage
- Stang shooting, a rapid-fire competition in the Det frivillige Skyttervesen contested with rifle, where the goal is to shoot as many hits as possible at two different figures during two rounds of 25 seconds
