= Mad minute =

Shooting exercise

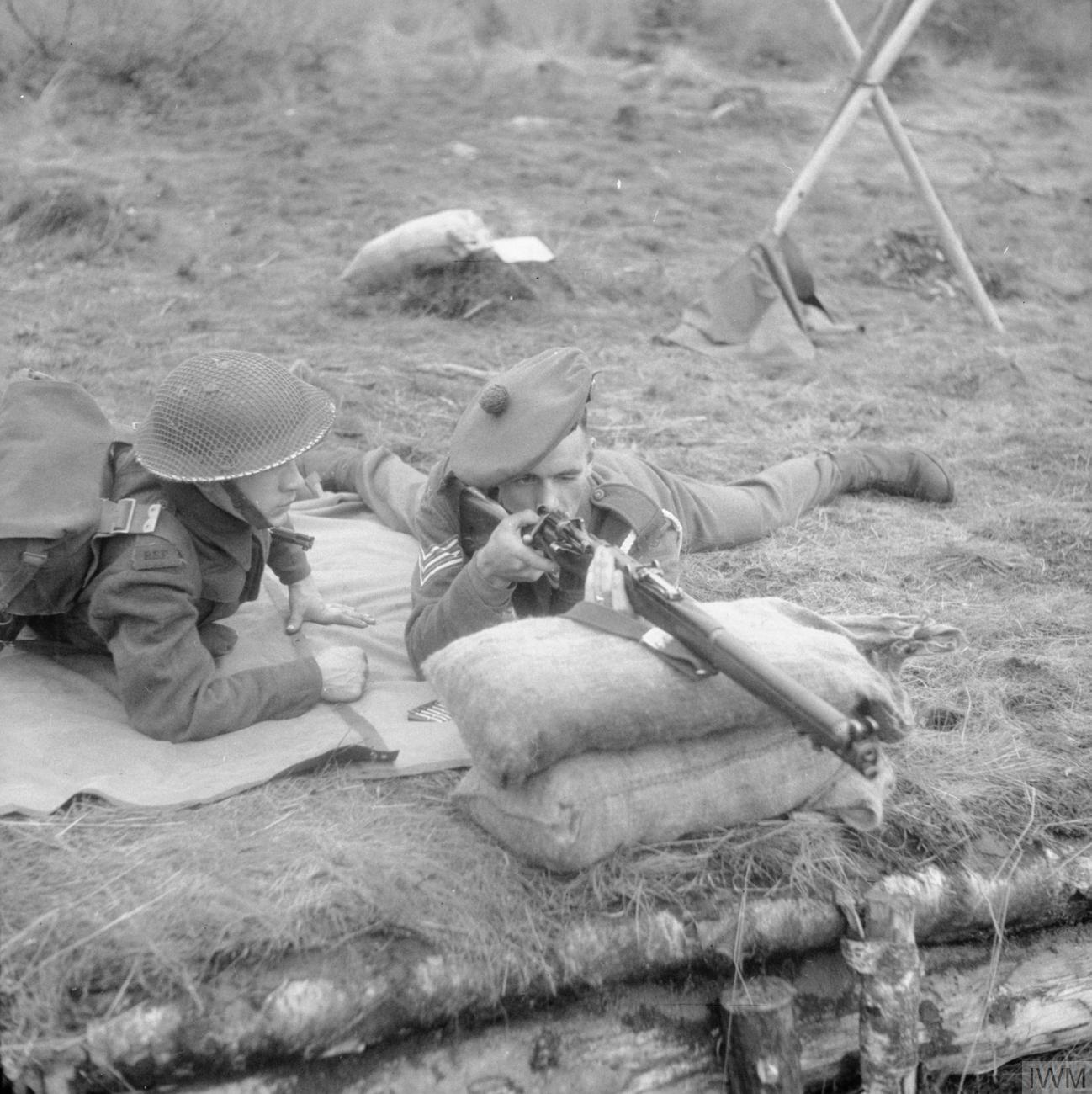
A British sergeant instructor with the Royal Scots Fusiliers trains a recruit on how to fire the SMLE Mk III Lee–Enfield in prone position, 31 August 1942.

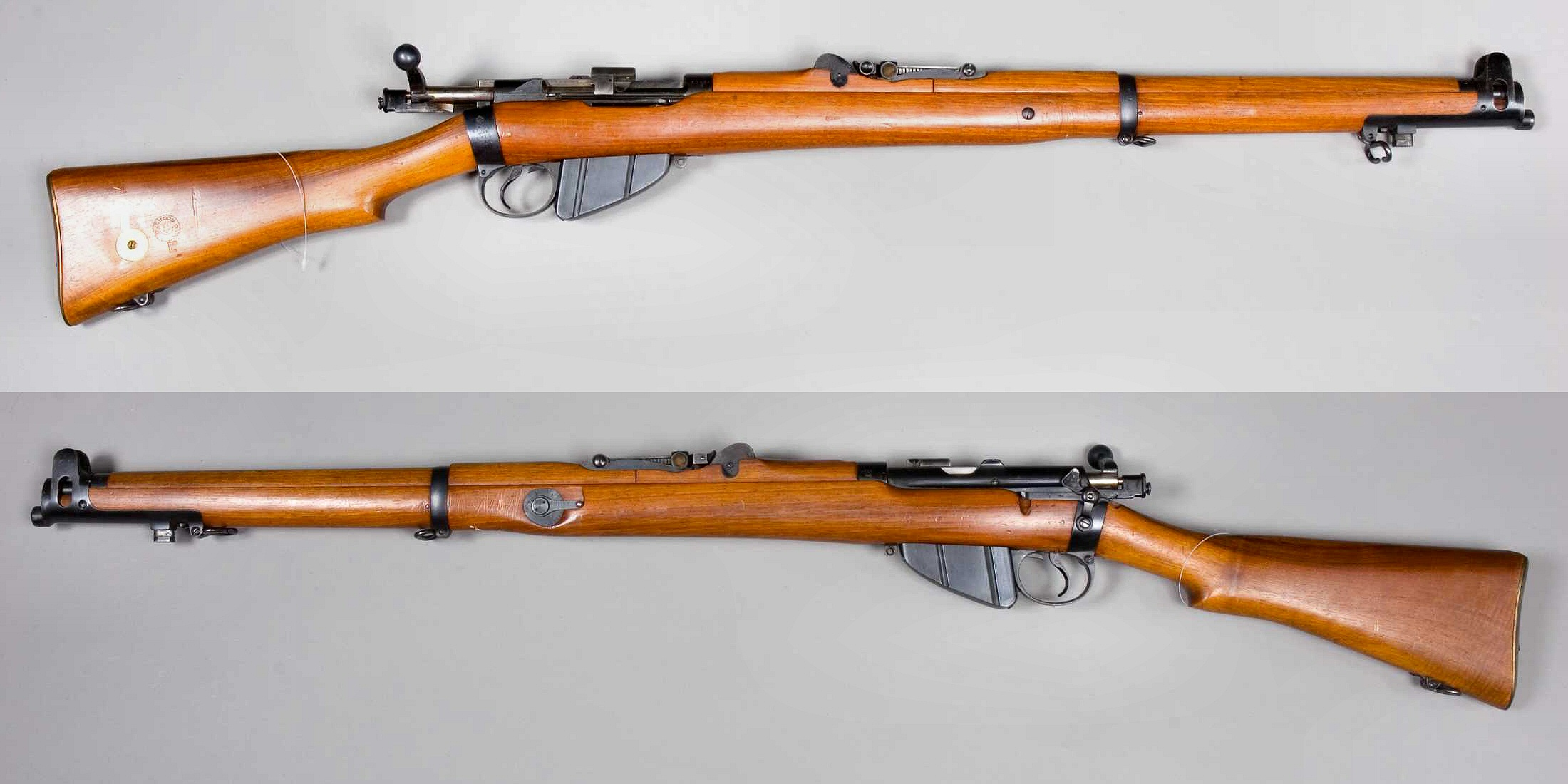
The Lee–Enfield bolt action rifle is known for its smooth operation and often associated with the Mad Minute.

The Mad Minute was a pre-World War I bolt-action rifle speed shooting exercise used by British Army riflemen, using the Lee–Enfield service rifle. The exercise, formally known as "Practice number 22, Rapid Fire, The Musketry Regulations, Part I, 1909", required the rifleman to fire 15 rounds at a "Second Class Figure" target at 300 yd (270 m). The practice was described as follows: "Lying. Rifle to be loaded and 4 rounds in the magazine before the target appears. Loading to be from the pouch or bandolier by 5 rounds afterwards. One minute allowed."

The practice was only one of the exercises from the annual classification shoot which was used to grade a soldier as a marksman, first-class or second-class shot, depending on the scores he had achieved.

The "Second Class Figure Target" was 48 inches square (approximately 1.2 × 1.2 metres), with 24 in (61 cm) inner and 36 in (91 cm) magpie circles. The aiming mark was a 12 in × 12 in (30 cm × 30 cm) silhouette figure that represented the outline of the head of a man aiming a rifle from a trench. Points were scored by a hit anywhere on the target.

== World record ==
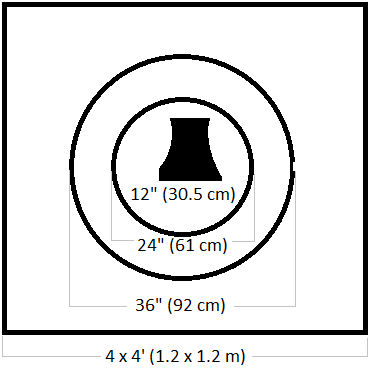
A sketch of the Second Class Figure target used in the original Mad Minute Classification Exercise. The 12" aiming mark resembles the silhouette of a soldier. 3 points are scored for hits within the inner 24" circle, 2 points are scored for hits within the outer 36" circle and 1 point is scored for hits within the 48" square

The term 'Mad Minute' was also used to describe a regular demonstration, by instructors at the School of Musketry at Hythe, Kent, that was intended to show officer trainees the maximum rate of accurate fire that could be achieved by an expert with a service rifle.

The first Mad Minute record was set by Sergeant Major Jesse Wallingford in 1908, scoring 36 hits on a 48-inch target at 300 yards (4.5 mils / 15.3 moa).

Another world record of 38 hits, all within the 24 inch target at 300 yards (2.25 mils / 7.6 moa), is said to have been set in about 1914 by a Sergt.-Instructor Snoxall. 'Sergt.-Instructor Snoxall' was probably Sergeant Frank Snoxell of the Loyal North Lancashire Regiment, who was an instructor at the School of Musketry from October 1913 until January 1917. He was a Sergeant-Instructor from October 1913 until he was promoted in March 1915. Sergeant Snoxell had previously been a Sergeant-Instructor at the Branch School of Musketry at Satara in India.

In the Mad Minute Challenge in Norway in 2015 a standard 200 m DFS target was used, scoring 1 point for every hit inside the black area which is 400 mm in diameter and corresponds to 2 mils at 200 metres (6.9 moa). This actually makes the target size used in the Norwegian event smaller compared to the story of Sergeant-Instructor Snoxall, who had all 38 hits inside a 24" circle at 300 yards (2.22 mils / 7.64 moa).

A Mad Minute event was held in Soknedal, Norway, on 30 May 2015 featuring some of the best stang shooters in the country. The competition was called the "Mad Minute Challenge", and was shot at a round 400 mm diameter target at 200 metres (2 mils/ 6.9 moa), making the target smaller than original. The winner, Thomas Høgåsseter, scored 36 hits. The average score, of 11 shooters, was 29.

In 2019, Norwegian sport shooter Inge Hvitås set a new world record with 39 hits during a Mad Minute competition in Nes, Hedmark, out of 44 rounds fired. Jesper Nilsstua also fired 48 rounds during the same competition, but got 38 hits, and therefore came second having one hit less than Hvitås.

The modern Norwegian records have been made using the magazine fed SIG Sauer 200 STR, which is a target rifle as opposed to the stripper clip fed Enfield military rifles. Also these modern "Mad Minute" claims were achieved without the requirement, as specified in the 1909 Musketry Regulations, that each clip of cartridges be taken not only from the soldier's ammunition pouch or bandoleer but that that pouch or bandoleer be fastened back closed after that clip had been taken out.

== Target section sizes ==
The tables below are based on the sections (12, 24, 36 and 48 inches) of the original Second Class Figure target placed at 300 yards, and shows the same relative target sizes for different ranges. The military service ammunition from that time (such as .303 British, .30-06 Springfield, 6.5×55mm, 8×57mm etc.) were more high powered and less prone to suffer from wind drift compared to modern military intermediate cartridge (such as 5.56 NATO, 5.45×39mm, 5.8×42mm, etc.). With the high powered calibers wind drift will barely be noticeable at 100 m, slightly more at 200 m and will only become a small factor at 300 m.

- Equivalent imperial target sizes

Relative size	100 yd (91 m)	200 yd (183 m)	300 yd (270 m)
3.82 moa (1.11 mil)	4 in (100 mm)	8 in (203 mm)	12 in (305 mm)
6.75 moa (2 mil)	7 in (180 mm)	14 in (355 mm)	21 in (530 mm)
7.64 moa (2.22 mil)	8 in (203 mm)	16 in (406 mm)	24 in (610 mm)
11.46 moa (3.34 mil)	12 in (305 mm)	24 in (610 mm)	36 in (914 mm)
15.3 moa (4.5 mil)	16 in (410 mm)	32 in (810 mm)	48 in (1220 mm)

- Equivalent metric target sizes

Relative size	100 m	200 m	300 m	Explanation
1.11 mil (3.82 moa)	111 mm	222 mm	333 mm	Size of aiming mark of the Second Class Figure
2 mil (6.75 moa)	200 mm	400 mm	600 mm	Target size used in the modern Mad Minute Challenge, scoring only 1 point per hit (2015 record of 36 hits)
2.22 mil (7.64 moa)	222 mm	444 mm	666 mm	Inner ring of the Second Class Figure (3 points), sizes equivalent to the story of Sergeant-Instructor Snoxall's 38 hits
3.34 mil (11.46 moa)	334 mm	668 mm	1000 mm	Outer ring of the Second Class Figure (2 points)
4.5 mil (15.3 moa)	450 mm	900 mm	1350 mm	Outer square of the Second Class Figure (1 point)

== See also ==
- Felthurtigskyting
- Panjagan, a hypothesized ancient technique to fire a volley of five arrows

== Sources ==
- Holmes, Richard, "From Musket to Breech Loader", History Trails, BBC
