= Shooting ranges in Switzerland =

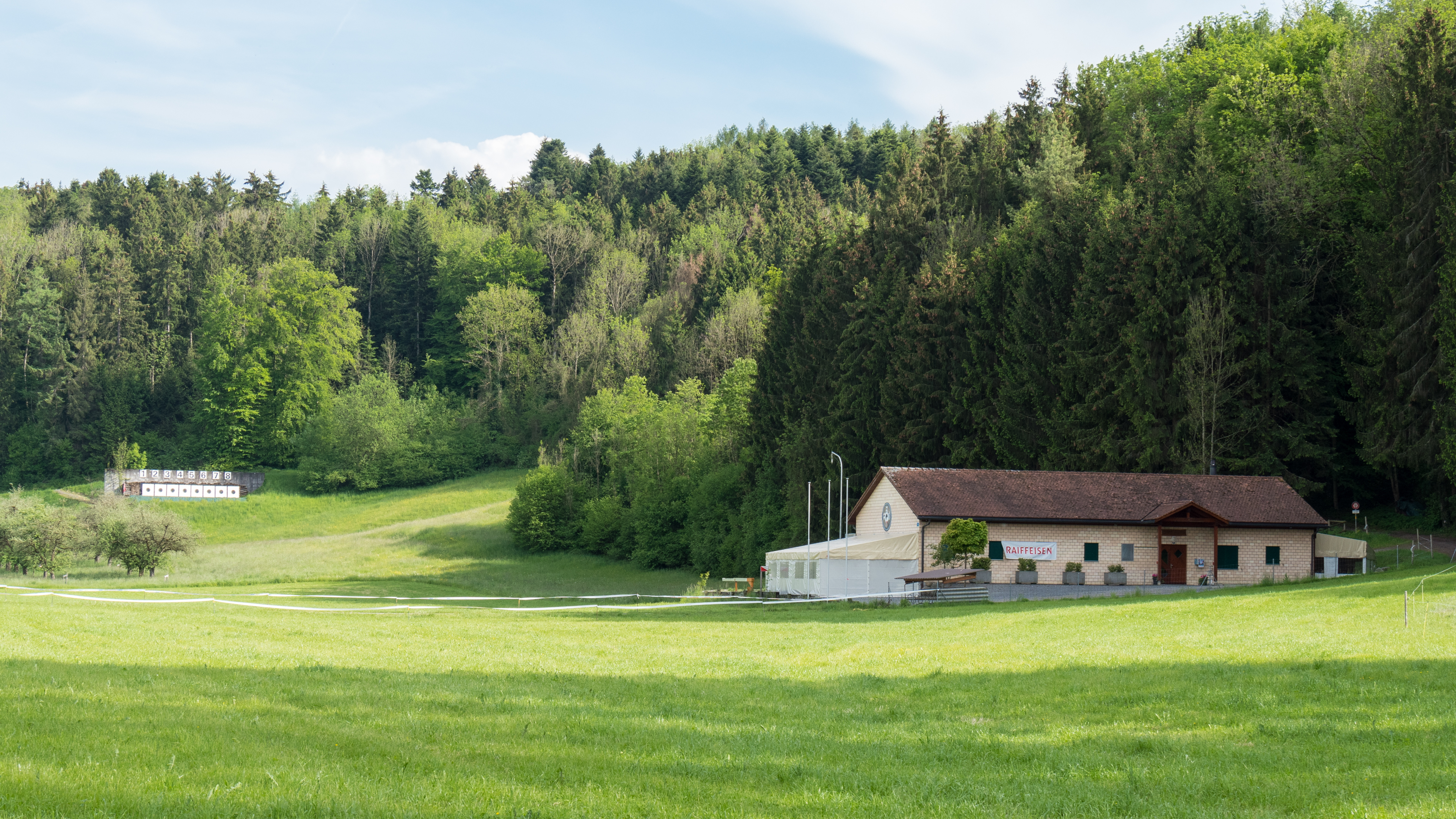
The "Shooting House" (Schützenhaus) and 300metre targets at Bussnang

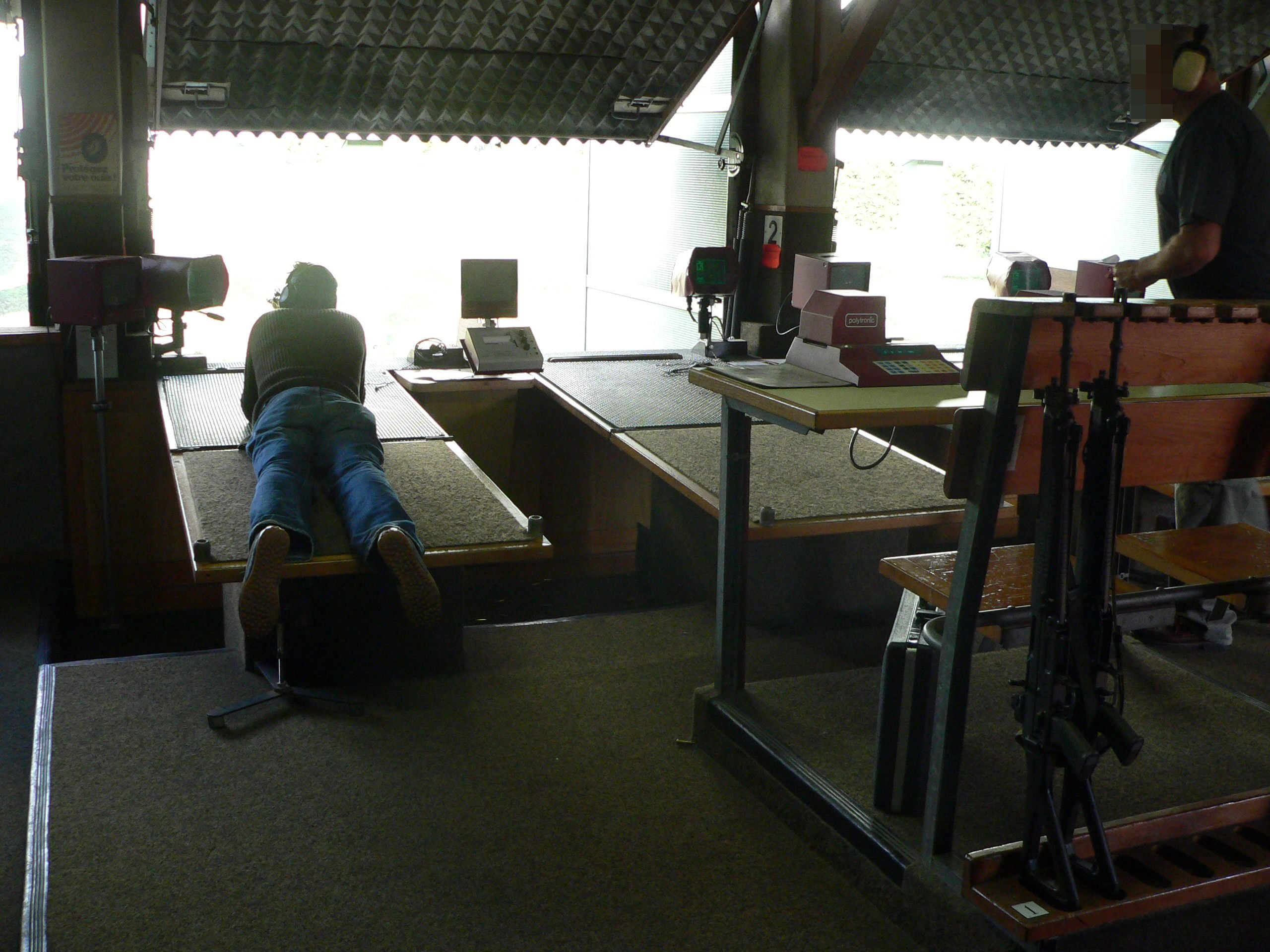
The federal shooting range of Versoix, Switzerland; people come to such ranges to complete mandatory training (Obligatorischeschiessen) with service arms, or to shoot for sport and competition.

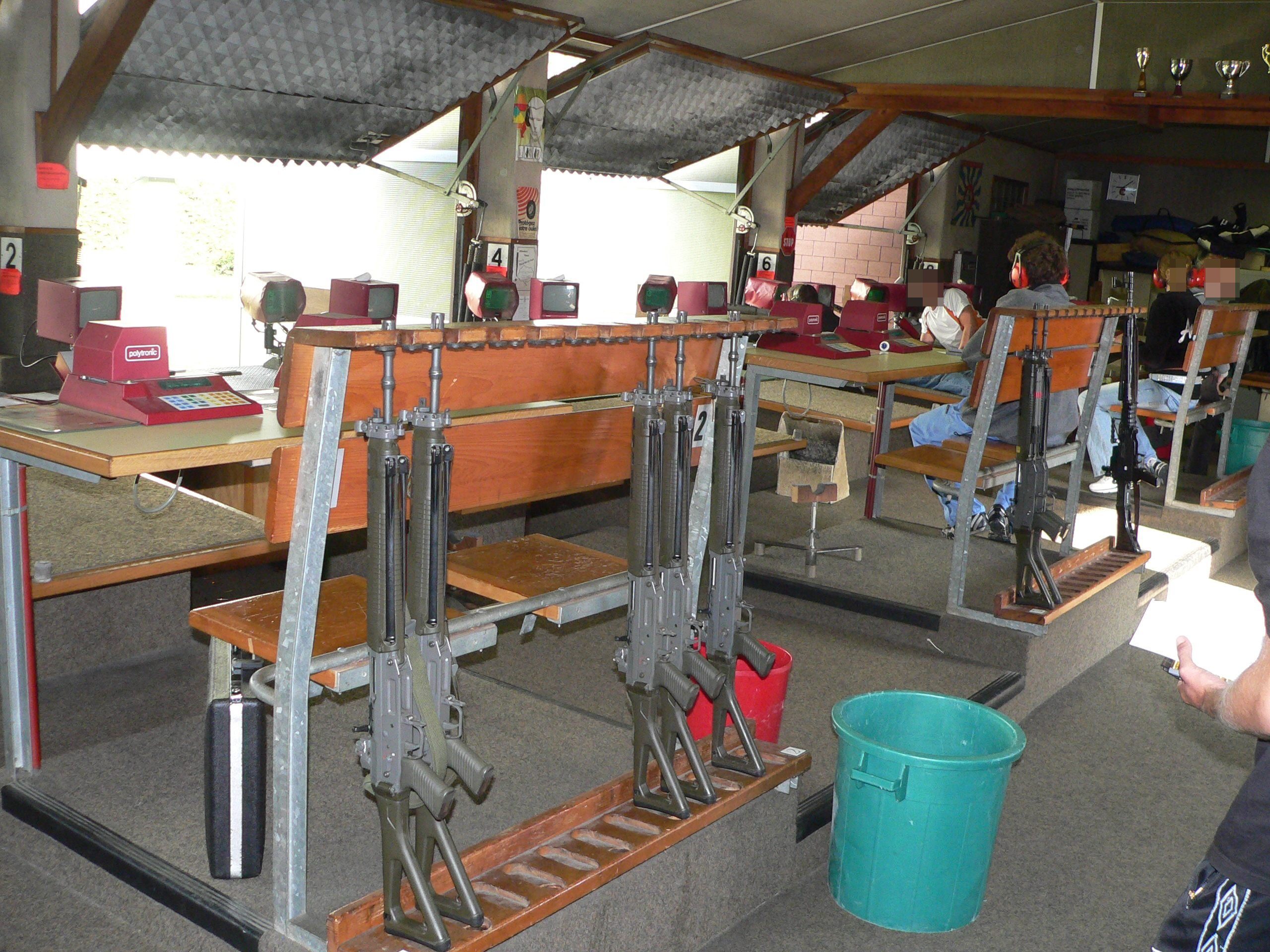
The federal shooting range of Versoix, Switzerland

Shooting ranges in Switzerland are characterised by the widespread provision of targets at 300 metres (330 yd) for service rifle training and qualification, along with a schützenhaus which serves as a community hub for local schützenverein (shooting societies), often including bar and cafe for social events. This results from long-standing connections with Switzerland's militia system, which has led to strong civilian shooting traditions and liberal gun laws.

The challenge of fitting ranges into mountainous Swiss terrain has led to a number of unusual designs, such as the Brünnlisau range, where shooters fire over a main road at targets on the other side of the valley.

== Background ==
In support of national defence, most towns have a federal public range, which is often associated with local shooting clubs and societies. This supports both military training and target sport under Schweizer Schiesssportverband. The standard range distance is 300 metres (330 yd), which has led to Switzerland being historically strong in the ISSF 300m disciplines and CISM 300 metre events.

Public ranges typically sell subsidised ammunition in Swiss military calibers including Gw Pat 90 rounds for issued service rifles. Such ammunition, if bought by minors, has to be used immediately and under supervision.

No permit is needed for an individual to transport an unloaded firearm to or from a shooting range.

=== Distances ===
Federal public ranges tend to be 300metres, for the use of service rifles such as the Stgw 90, Stgw 57 or K31 as well as standard rifle. Adjacent shooting clubs may also provide ranges at 50, 25 and 10metres to support smallbore rifle, pistol and airgun shooting. ISSF shooting has a high penetration in Switzerland, and target shooting at longer ranges (such as the 600-1,000yard distances used in Fullbore target rifle) is unusual. The Swiss Fifty Calibre Shooters Association shoots to 1,200 metres (1,300 yd), but facilities for this are limited.

== Design and Locations ==
Outdoor shooting ranges are typically located as far from population centres as is practicable, with the range space closed during shooting for safety. Due to the mountainous nature of Switzerland, unconventional designs have sometimes been required where civil defence considerations require a range facility, but other development cannot be entirely segregated from shooting activities.

=== Brünnlisau Range ===
One particularly noted example is the Schiessanlage Brünnlisau where shooters fire across the valley, and across a busy highway. The road is shielded from the firing point by a baffle wall, which prevents stray shots leaving the range safety envelope.

=== Target Technology ===
Swiss ranges were early adopters of electronic scoring targets (ESTs). Swiss EST manufacturer Sius Ascor has held the contract to provide EST systems for rifle and pistol shooting at the Olympic Games and ISSF World Championships since the 1990s. Sius maintain a range of Swiss-specific products.

== See also ==
- Gun politics in Switzerland
- Shooting sport
- Schützenverein
