= Nordic field rapid shooting =

Practical rifle competition

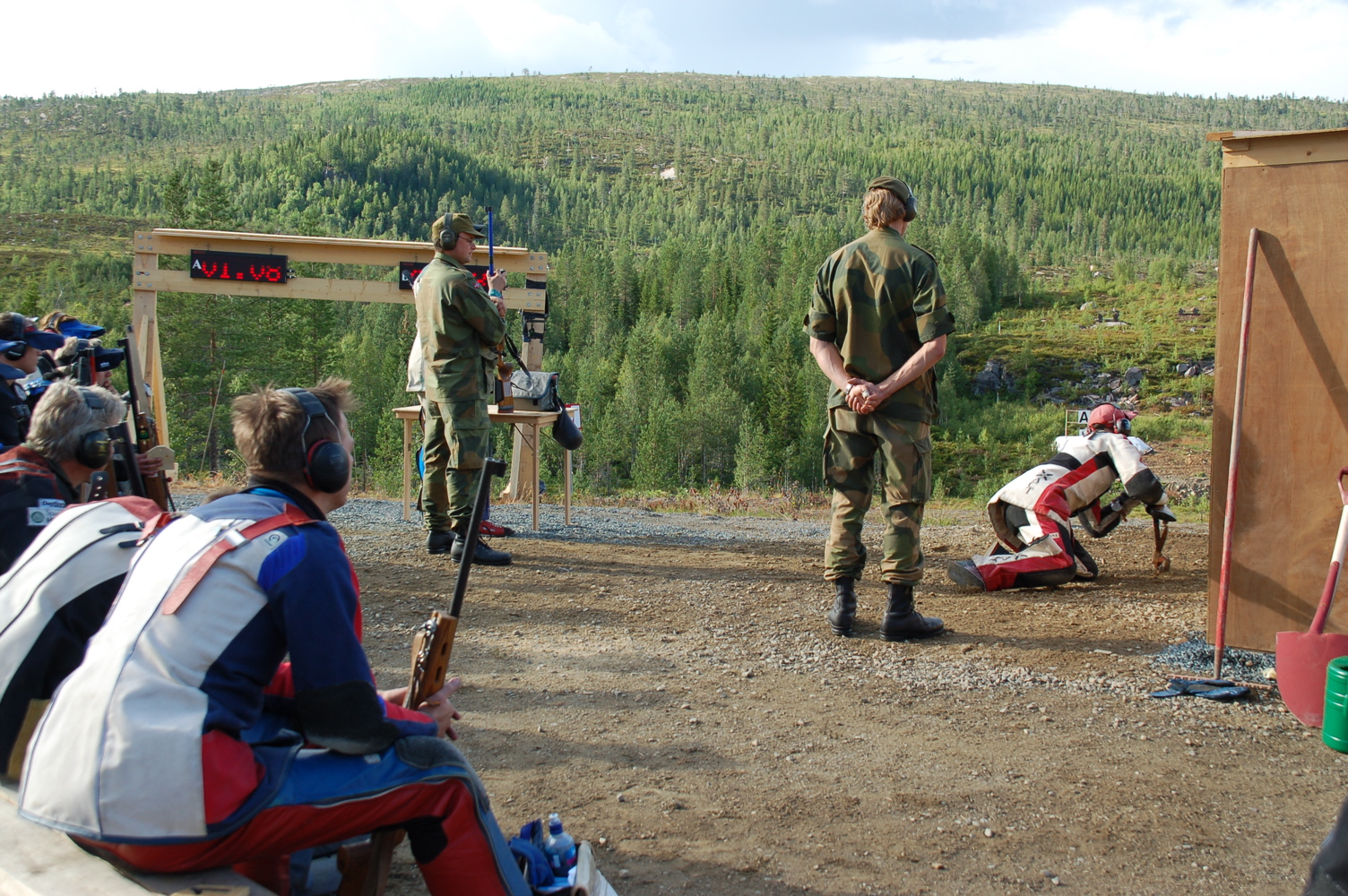
Felthurtigskyting in Norway in 2007.

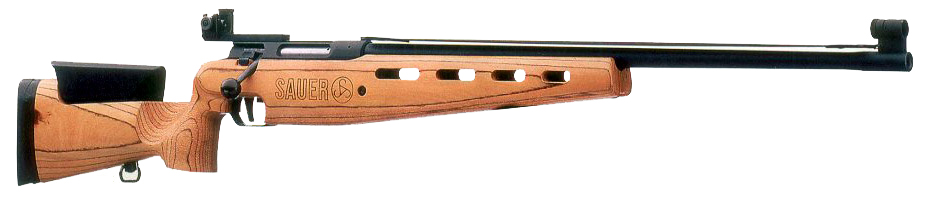
Sauer 200 STR (Scandinavian Target Rifle) is the most commonly used rifle for felthurtigskyting nowadays.

Felthurtigskyting, literally field-rapid-shooting, is a practical rifle competition popular in Scandinavia, where the shooter has to engage three different targets placed at different distances with one shot each in the shortest time possible.

Competitions are arranged by Det frivillige Skyttervesen in Norway, Svenska Skyttesportförbundet in Sweden and Danske Gymnastik- & Idrætsforeninger in Denmark. Felthurtigskyting is one of the disciplines in the Nordic Championship held each year.

== Procedure ==
Maximum 6 rounds can be used, starting from the standing position with the rifle loaded and the safety catch applied. The shooting position is freestyle, but generally the prone position is used. At the command "Fire" the shooter disengages the safety catch and assumes firing position. There are several documented techniques for the "dive" which is the transition from standing to prone, which mainly can be divided into the "rolling method" and the "kneeling method". The targets used are two «Småen» at maximum 150 meters, and either a 1/3 target (third target) at maximum 275 meters or a 1/4 target (quarter target) at maximum 225 meters. The two nearest targets must be shot before moving to the farthest.

- Småen measures 305 mm wide and 250 mm high, which placed at the maximum distance of 150 meters corresponds to an angular size of about 2 milliradians wide and 1.7 mrad high.
- The 1/3 target measures 500 mm wide and 480 mm high, which placed at the maximum distance of 275 meters corresponds to an angular size of about 1.8 mrad wide and 1.7 mrad high.
- The 1/4 target measures 330 mm wide and 490 mm high, which placed at the maximum distance of 225 meters corresponds to an angular size of about 1.5 mrad wide and 2.2 mrad high.
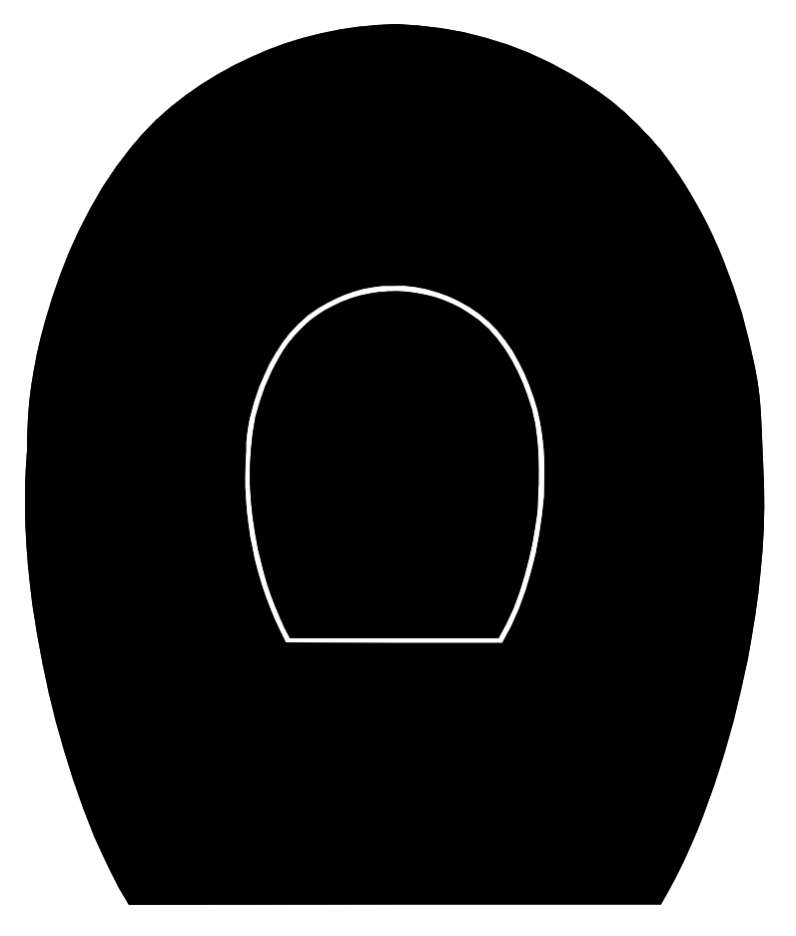
The Småen target.

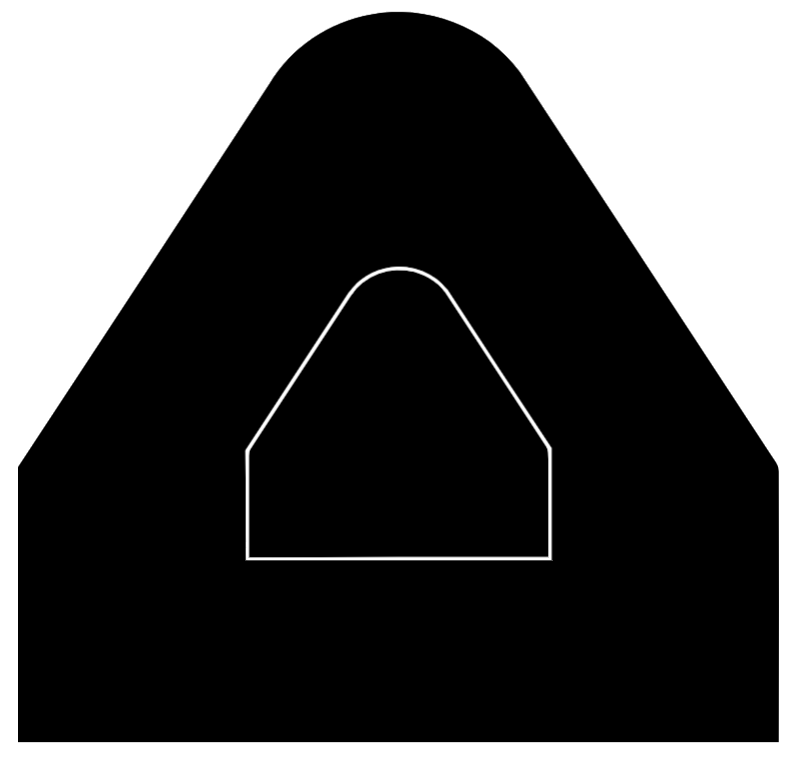
The One Third target.

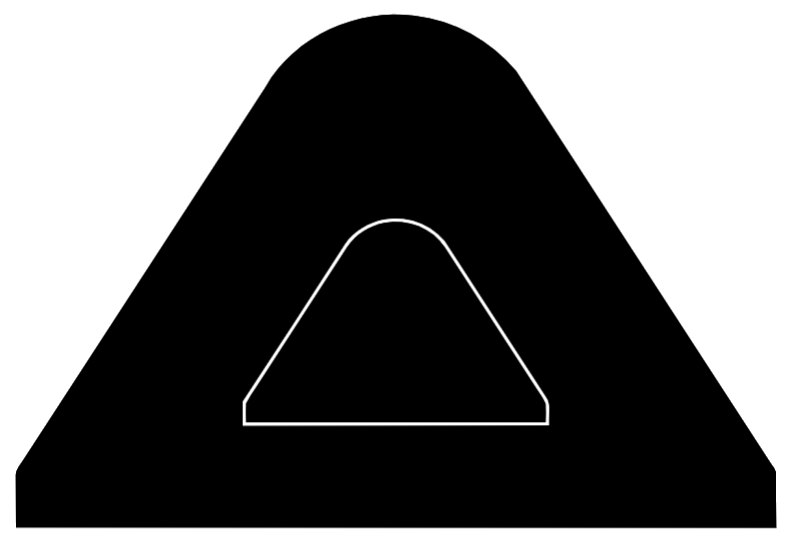
The Quarter target.

== Approved rifles ==
Used by civilian shooters:

- Krag–Jørgensen (in Stang shooting since 1912, still somewhat popular)
- Mauser M67 (since the 1960s)
- SIG Sauer 200 STR (since 1990)

Used by military personnel:

- AG-3 (until 2021)
- HK416 (since 2018)

It has been debated whether military and civilian shooters should continue to compete against each other.

== See also ==
- Stang shooting
- Mad minute
