= Stang shooting =

Practical rifle competition

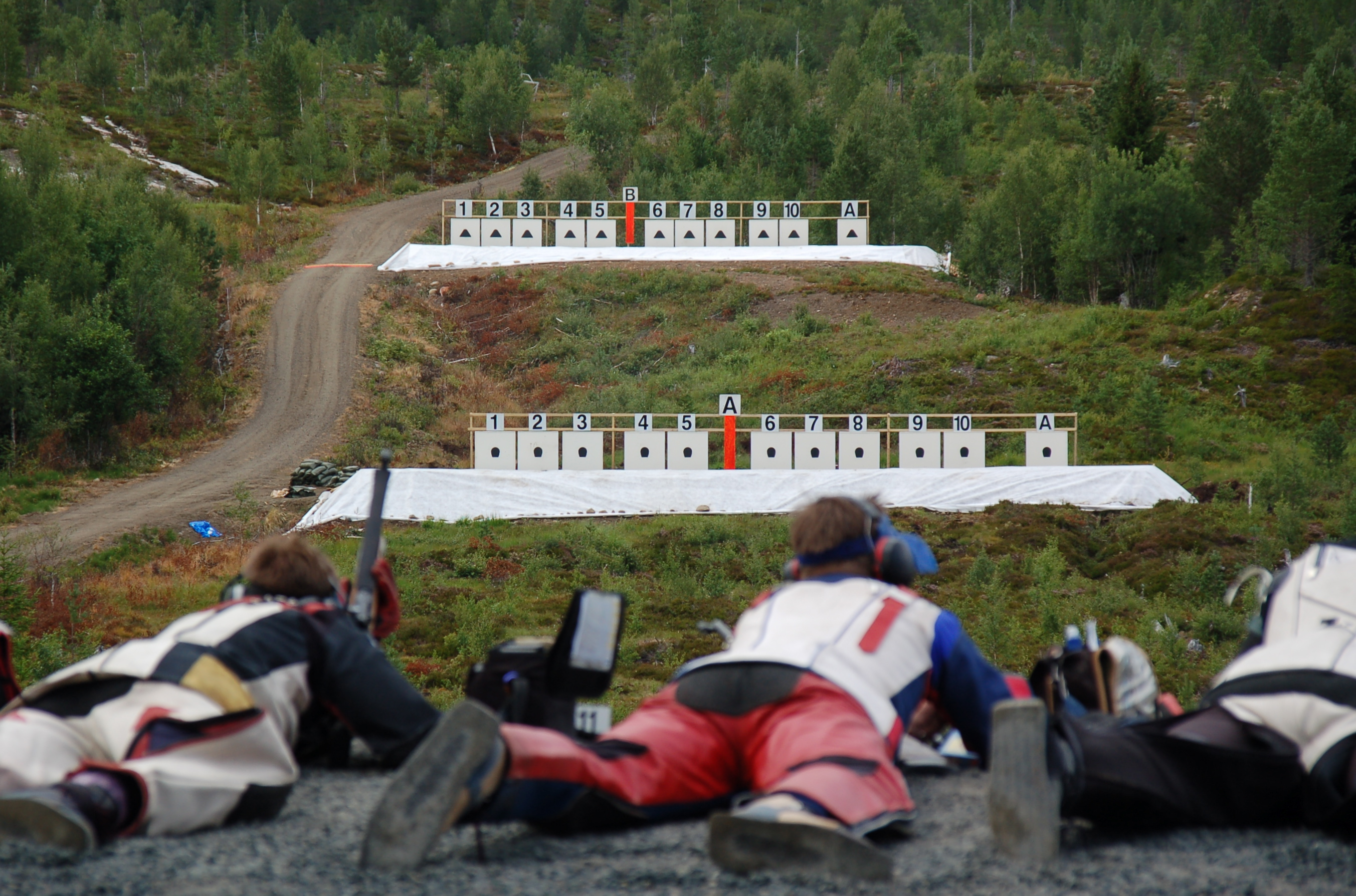
Stangskyting in Norway, 2007. The nearest target is placed at 155 meters, and the furthest at 221 meters.

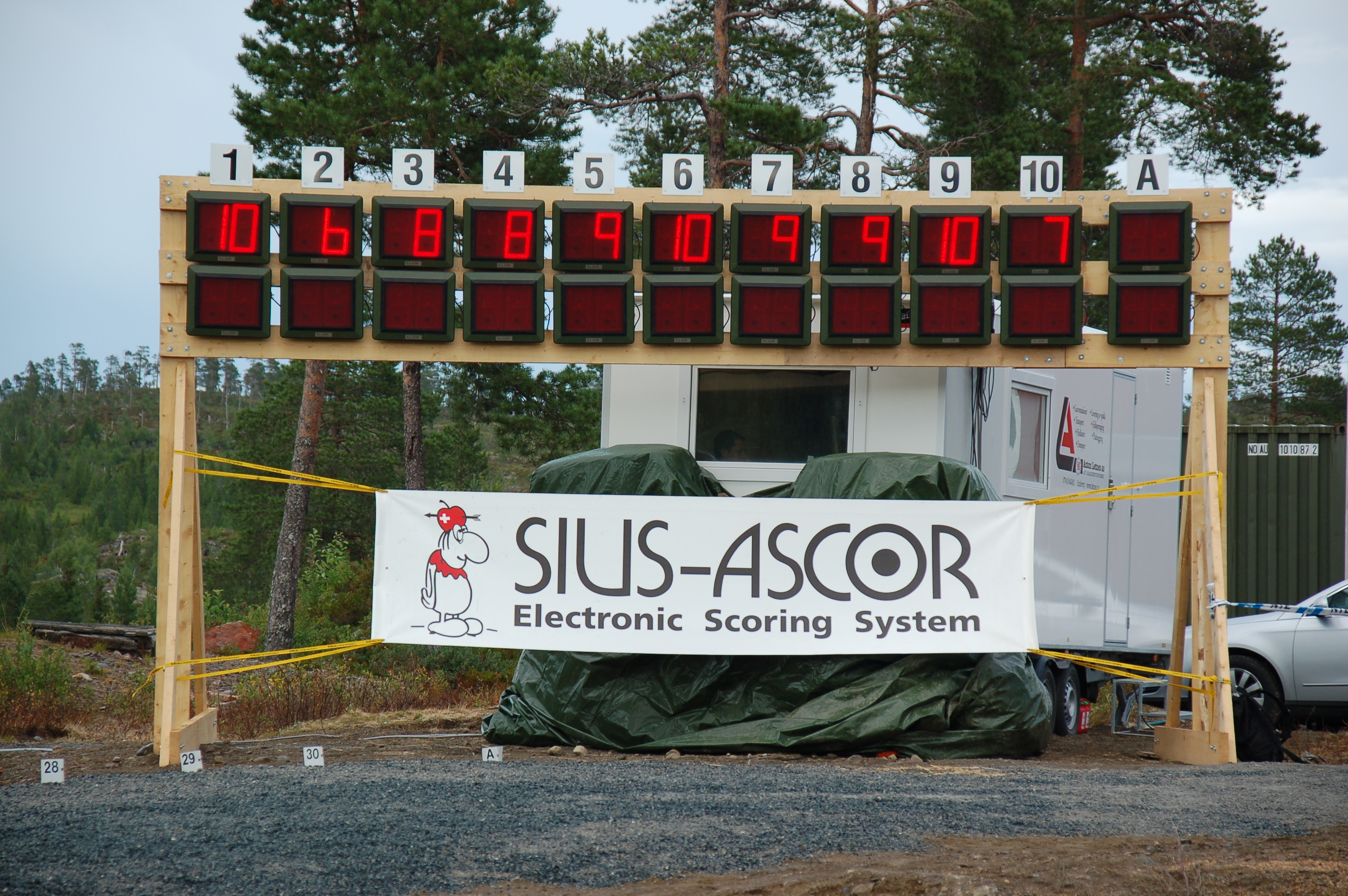
An electronic scoring board showing the number of hits for all shooters at the first half.

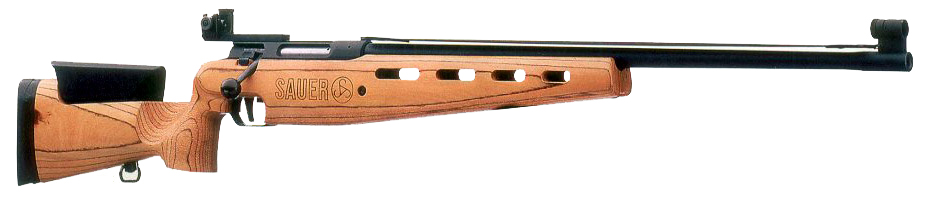
Sauer 200 STR (Scandinavian Target Rifle) is the most commonly used rifle for stangskyting nowadays.

Stangskyting, literally Stang-shooting named after Colonel Georg Stang (1858–1907), is a practical rifle competition popular in Norway where dueling shooters have two intervals of 25 seconds to get as many hits as possible on a target at an unknown distance, with an unlimited number of rounds. Competitions in Norway are arranged by Det frivillige Skyttervesen.

== Procedure ==
The shooting position is prone with the rifle loaded, safety catch applied and the butt of the stock touching the ground. At the "Ready!" command, the rifle is put to the shoulder and the safety catch disengaged. Five seconds later, the "Fire!" command is given. The targets used is Småen placed somewhere between 125 and 175 meters, and a 1/4 target ("quarter torso") placed somewhere between 200 and 250 meters.

- The Småen target is an oblong, tall and narrow shape which measures 250 mm tall and 305 mm wide. When placed at the minimum distance of 125 meters, Småen measures to ca. 2.4 mrad wide and 2 mrad tall, and when placed at the maximum distance of 175 meters, it corresponds to ca. 1.7 mrad wide and 1.4 mrad tall.
- The 1/4 target is a triangular shape which measures 330 mm wide and 490 mm tall. When placed at the minimum distance of 200 meters, the 1/4 target corresponds to ca. 1.7 mrad wide and 2.5 mrad tall, and when placed at the maximum distance of 250 meters, it corresponds to ca. 1.3 mrad wide and 2 mrad tall.

	Småen	Kvartfigur
Distance	125–175 m	200–250 m
Dimensions	305×250 mm	330×490 mm
Area	0.110 m^{2}	0.064 m^{2}
Area corresponds to a circle with diameter	374 mm	285 mm
Area corresponds to a circle with angular size (at min and max range)	3.0–2.4 mrad	1.4–1.1 mrad

== Approved rifles ==
Used by civilian shooters:

- Krag–Jørgensen (in Stang shooting since 1912, still somewhat popular)
- Mauser M67 (since the 1960s)
- SIG Sauer 200 STR (since 1990)

Used by military personnel:

- AG-3 (until 2021)
- HK416 (since 2018)

== Danish variant ==
A Danish variant similar to stangskyting called hurtigskydning (literally speed shooting) is arranged by Danske Gymnastik- & Idrætsforeninger (DGI). 10-ring bullseye targets at 200 m must be engaged with as many rounds as possible during 25 seconds, only scoring hits in the black area.

== See also ==
- Field rapid shooting, another Scandinavian practical rifle competition
- Mad minute, a British speed shooting exercise
