= Shooting target =

Target used in shooting sports

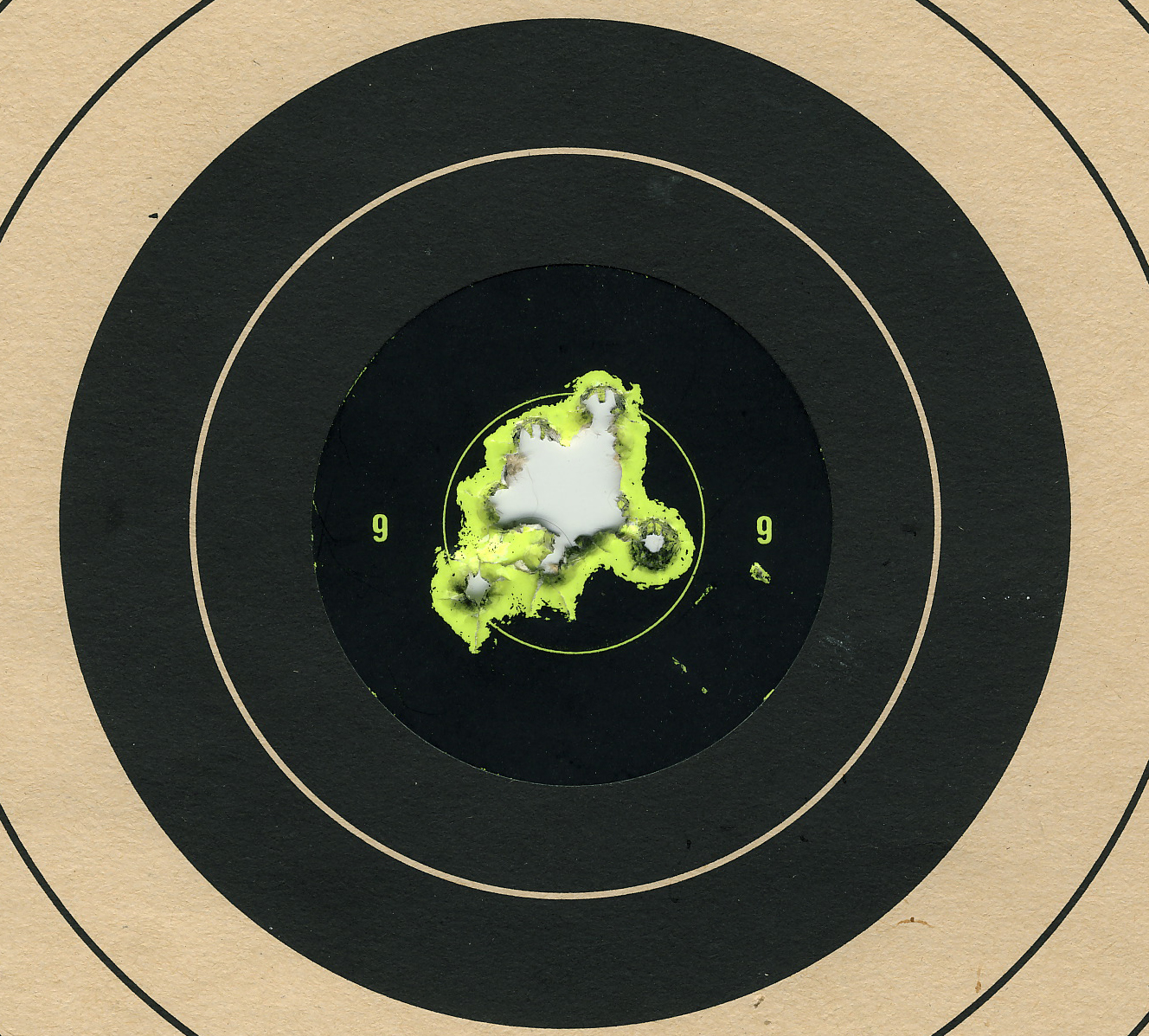
A "splatter"-type paper target — 25 shots at a distance of 91 metres (100 yd), all hitting inside the bullseye within a 25 millimetres (1 in) grouping

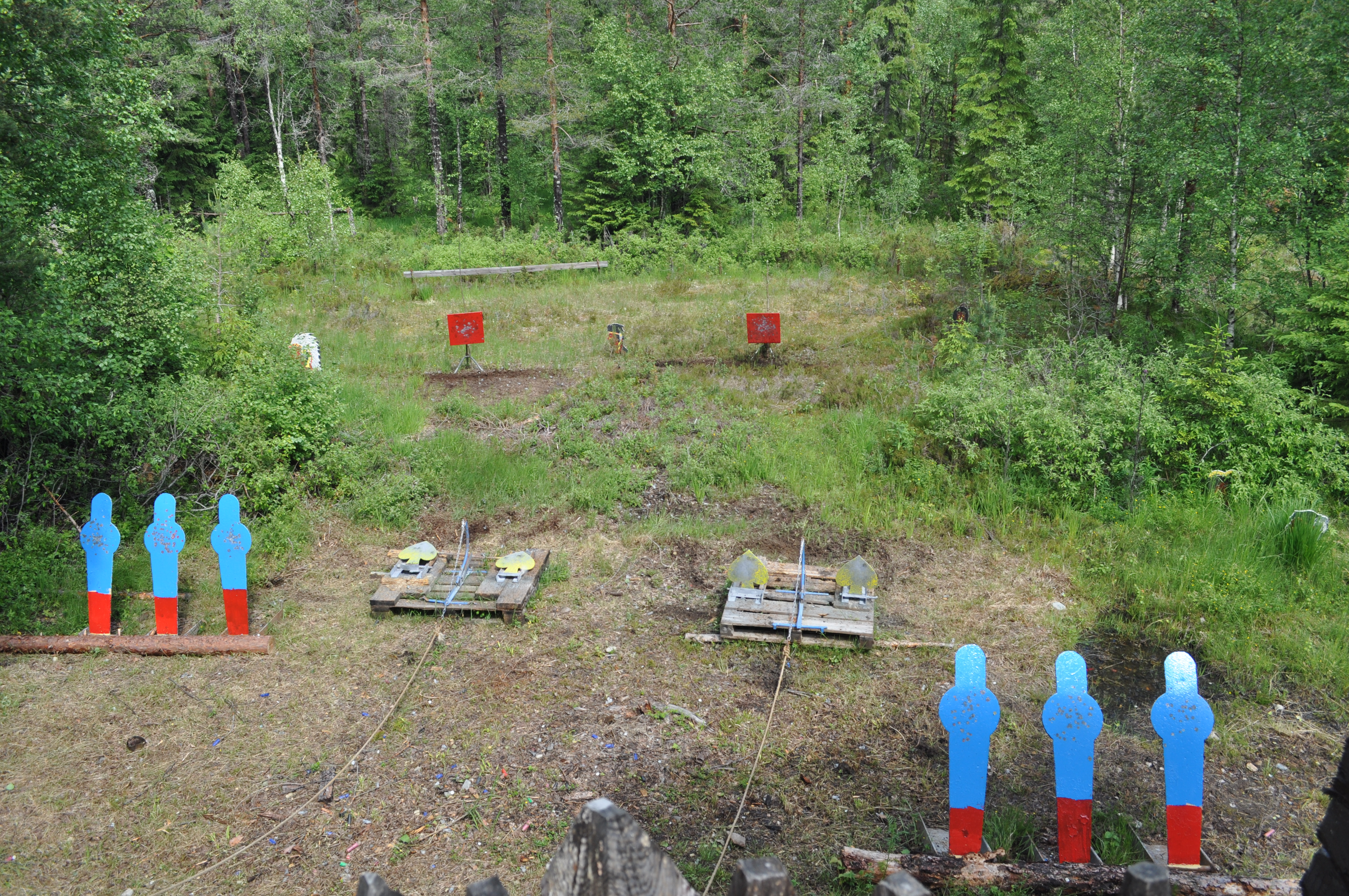
Steel targets used in cowboy action shooting

Shooting targets are objects in various forms and shapes that are used for pistol, rifle, shotgun and other shooting sports, as well as in darts, target archery, crossbow shooting and other non-firearm related sports. The center is often called the bullseye. Targets can for instance be made of paper, "self healing" rubber or steel. There are also electronic targets that electronically can provide the shooter with precise feedback of the shot placement.

== History ==
Most targets used in shooting sports today are abstract figures of which origins often are not given much thought, but given the military and hunting origins that started most shooting disciplines it is not hard to understand that many of the targets at some point originally resembled either human opponents in a battle or animals in a hunting situation. For instance, the well known circular bullseye target might originally have resembled a human torso or an animal being hunted. Notable instances of shooting targets with martial origins which are considered abstract today, are the field targets used in Det frivillige Skyttervesen where the original intent was to resemble amongst other wheels of vehicles (S25 target), barrels (tønne), bunker openings (stripe 30/10 and 13/40) or enemy personnel (1/3, 1/4, 1/6 and 1/10 figure, minismåen, etc.). The origin of these targets are not usually given

== Types of targets ==
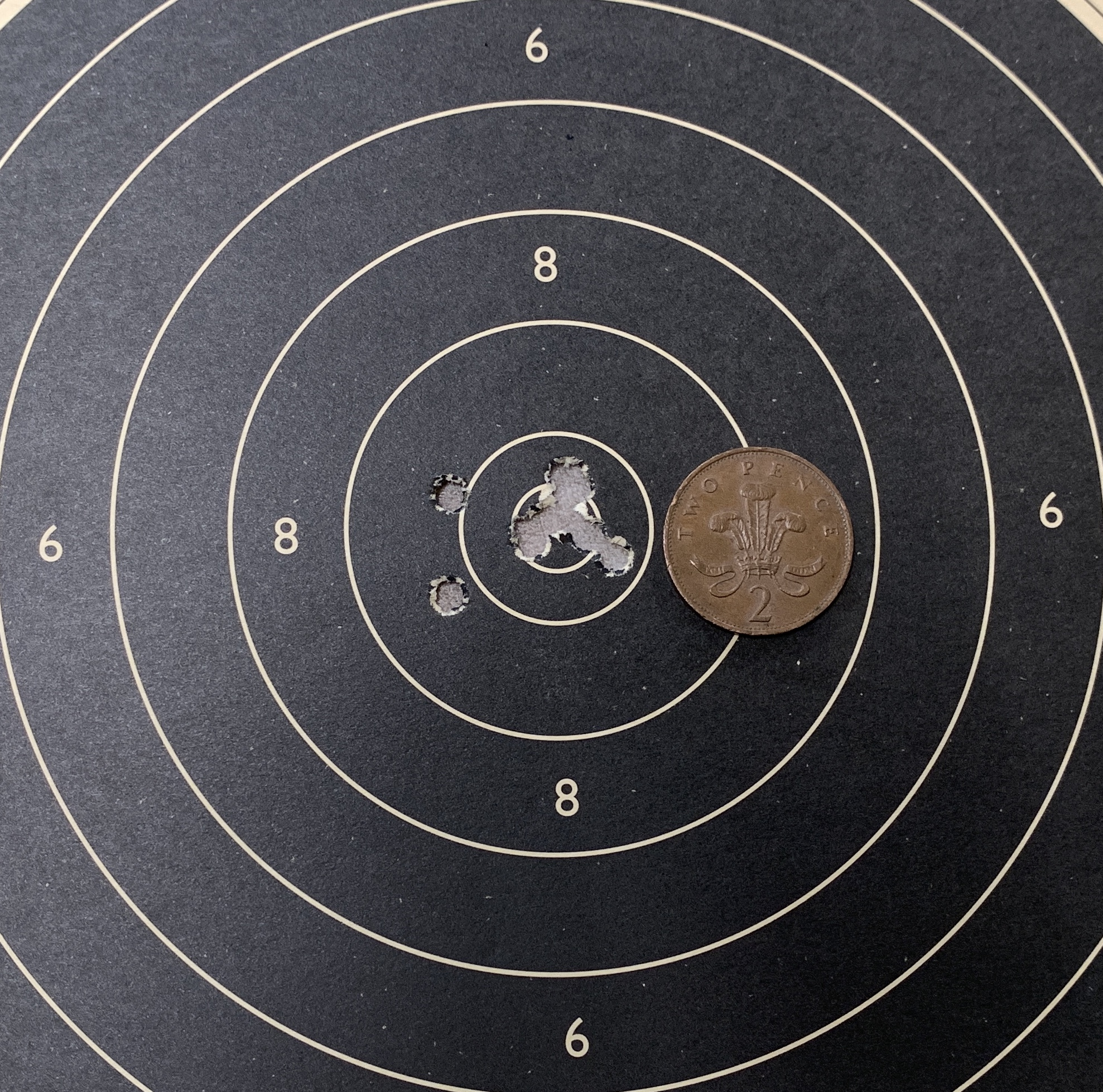
Paper target with a ten-shot grouping

=== by Action ===
- Stationary/static target
- Dynamic target
  - Running target - target is moving sideways (e.g. 100 metre running deer, 10 meter running target)
  - Moving target (example is defunct discipline moving target small-bore rifle)
  - Disappearing target (example is defunct discipline disappearing target small-bore rifle)
  - Flying target (used in skeet, trap, double trap)

=== by Reactivity ===
- Non-reactive
  - Paper target — ordinary disposable paper-based target with painted pattern for bullseye shooting, may be made from paperboard/cardboard, corrugated board or even fiberboard, and usually single-use and purchased in large quantities. Requires mounting onto a rack, a hanger, a wire or a backboard during use.
  - Foam target — usually cubic in shape, made from high-density styrofoam, foam rubber or laminated corriboard, and primary used for archery.
  - 3D target — animal/human-shaped mannequin, commonly made from plastic/fiberglass, corkwood or high-density styrofoam/foam rubber, though some exotic models (e.g. the infamous "The Ex") have elaborately designed internal contents resembling anatomical organs, skeletons and blood and may even be overmolded with ballistic gelatin. More frequently placed in a shooting range or field for 3D archery.
- Reactive — designed to produce a visible or audible response when hit, usually by generating a sharp sound or by moving and/or bouncing along the ground. They are frequently used for silhouette shooting and plinking, and can involve anything from proper competition/commercial products to casual objects such as tin cans, glass bottles, bowling pins, golf balls, metal barrels/plates or anything random that draws the shooter's attention.
  - "Splatter" target — dual-lamination paper targets with an overlayer of dark-colored background (most often black, also dark blue) and a light-colored underlayer (often white or fluorescent yellow) separated by a plastic film. When hit by a bullet, the plastic film around the impact hole edge shrivels to expose the brighter underlayer, creating around the hole a high-contrast jagged rim that looks like splattered paint, and allows easier observation from distance.
  - Steel targets — also known as "gongs", these will make loud sharp sounds that are audible from distance and (sometimes) movements when hit. Popular in action shooting, metallic silhouette, long range shooting and various field target/field shooting disciplines.
  - Bouncing targets — freely moving targets made from a type of "self-healing" elastomer material, which roll/flip and bounce along the ground when shot with a bullet. Commonly used in quick-firing plinking exercise with semi-automatic firearms and airguns, as the rolling/bouncing movements are often unpredictable and helpful in training for rapid aim re-establishment for follow-up shots.
  - Explosive targets — containers loaded with binary explosive (e.g. Tannerite) that are designed to detonate and release a small brief fireball when punctured by a bullet traveling with sufficient terminal energy. Dye powder are often added to produce a puff of colored smoke to enhance the visual effect. Flammable gas (e.g. propane/butane) bottles, which can produce a visible jet of flame when shot, can sometimes be used, but these carry a significant fire safety risk.

Balloons can often serve as a weak explosive target, as they are very cheap and visible (and disappear in a very obvious way when hit), and when punctured the rapid pressure release also produces an audible pop. There are also commercial air compressor devices that pressurize plastic bottles to produce a much louder boom when the bottle is breached by a bullet. Similarly, water balloons and used paperboard cartons/plastic jugs filled with water can also hydrostatically create a visible (and sometimes quite spectacular) splash when shot with a high-power bullet.

- Interactive — various targets are displayed on a bullet-proof screen that capture the impacts. The impacts are visible on the target screen and on the remote monitor via an electronic scoring system. It's called by many names: 'multi-functional virtual target system', 'interactive live fire shooting simulator', 'live fire targeting system', 'interactive video projection shooting range wall'...
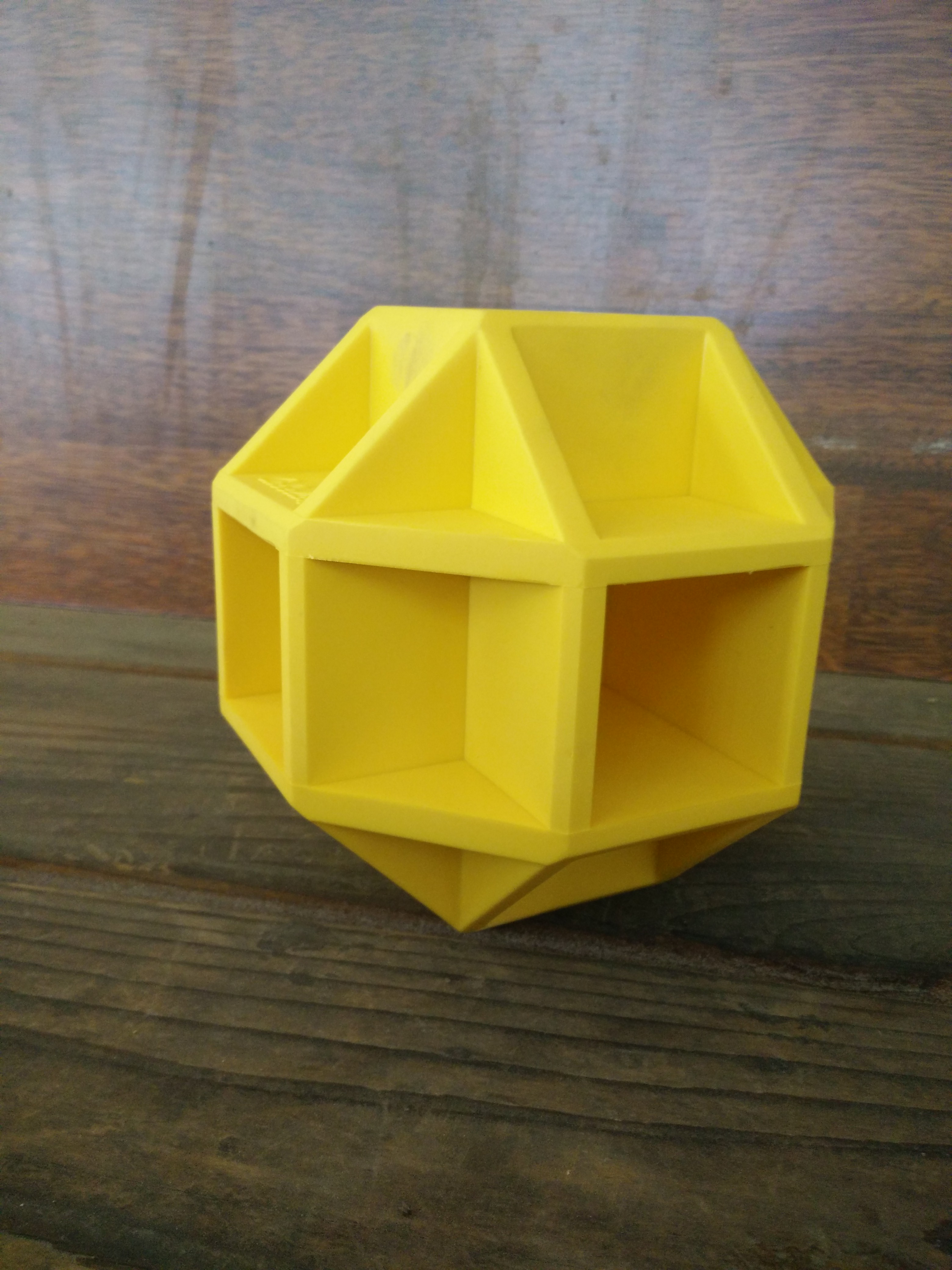
A Cabela's branded "self-healing ground bouncing reactive" target

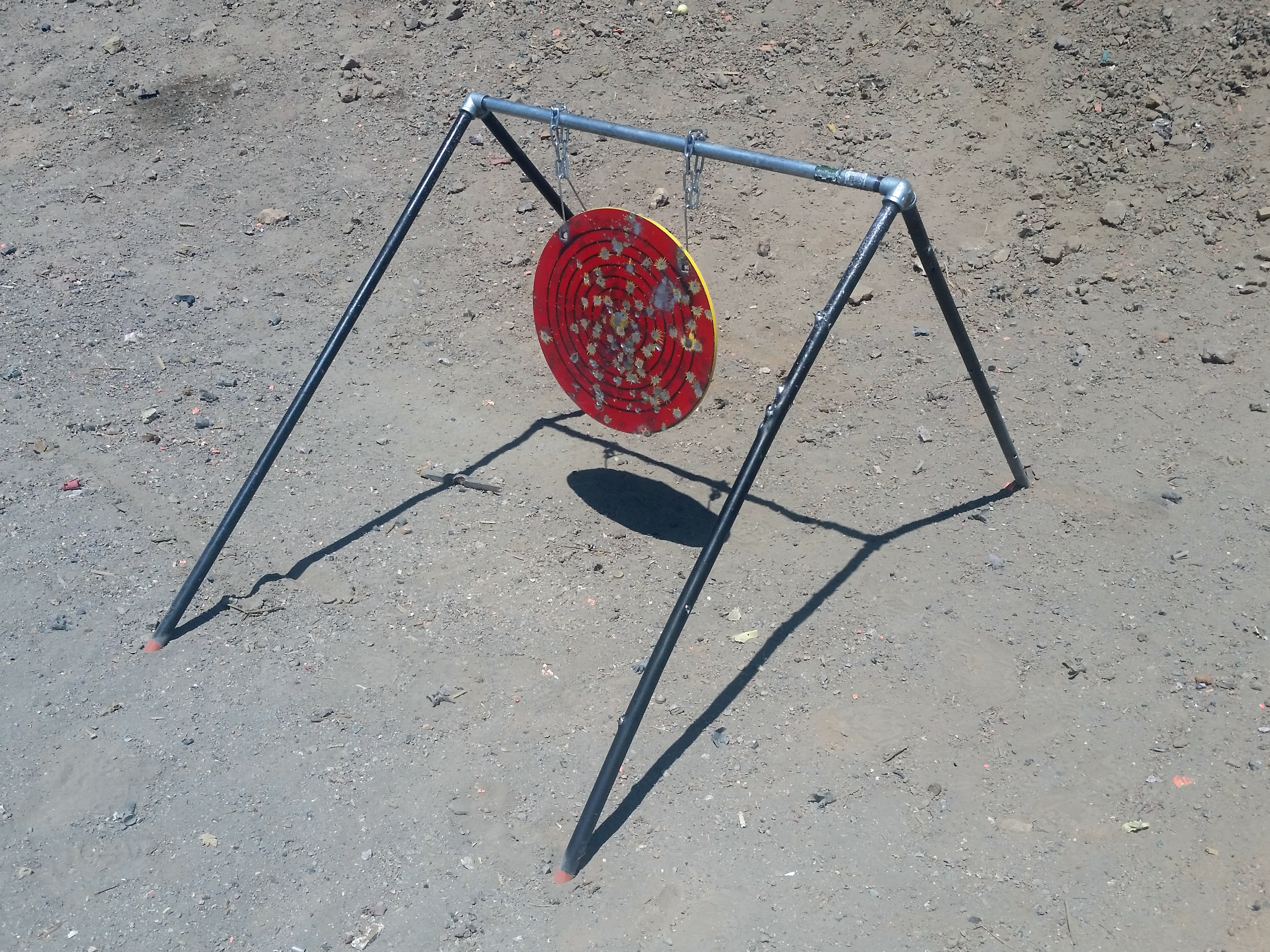
A swinging round steel target with suspension frame, popularly known as a "gong"

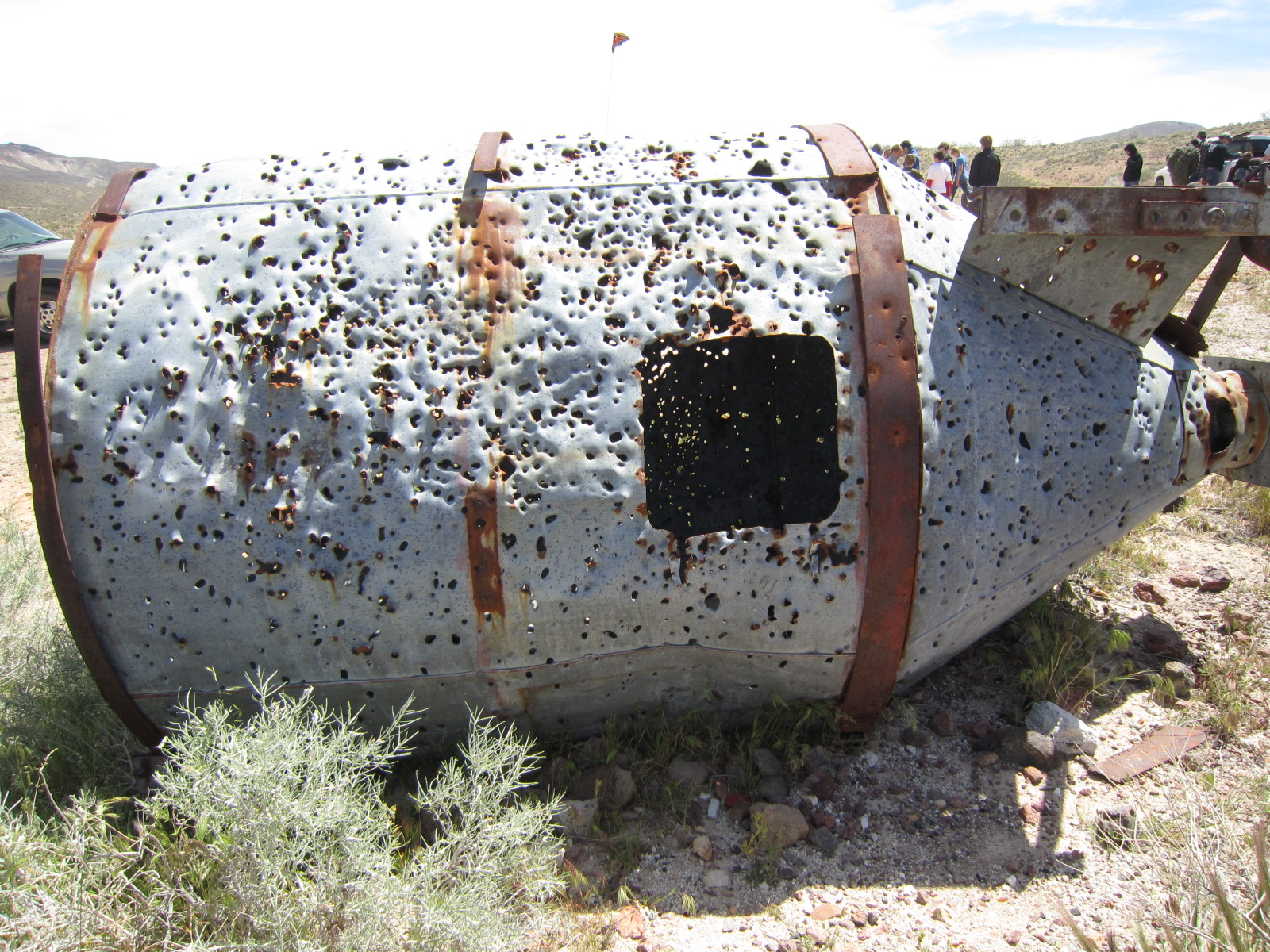
An abandoned metallic container used as a plinking target

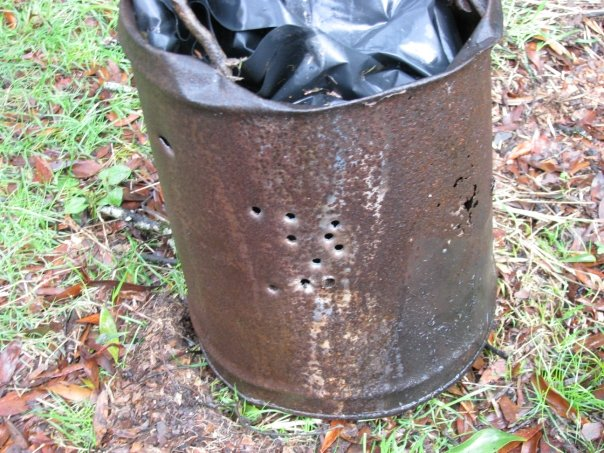
A rusty drum used as an improverized target

=== by Material ===
- Paper or cardboard
- Steel targets - metal silhouettes
- Foam - used in 3D archery
- Frangible (such as clay or tiles)
- Self-healing rubber target
- Electronic
- Explosive - Targets are designed to explode when stuck with a bullet traveling at a suitable velocity to induce detonation.
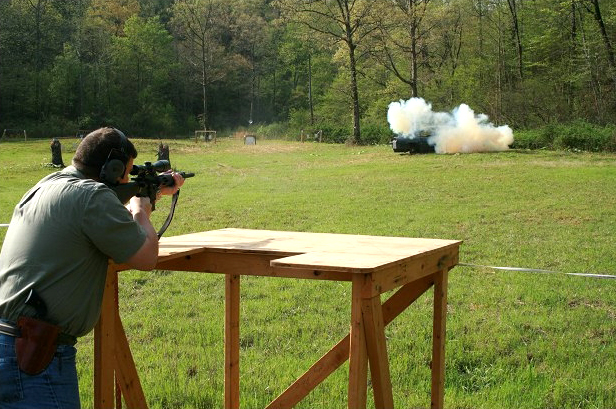
Exploding target detonation

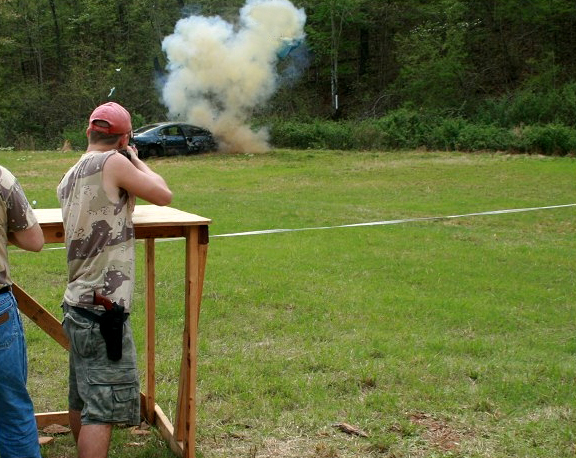
Exploding target detonation
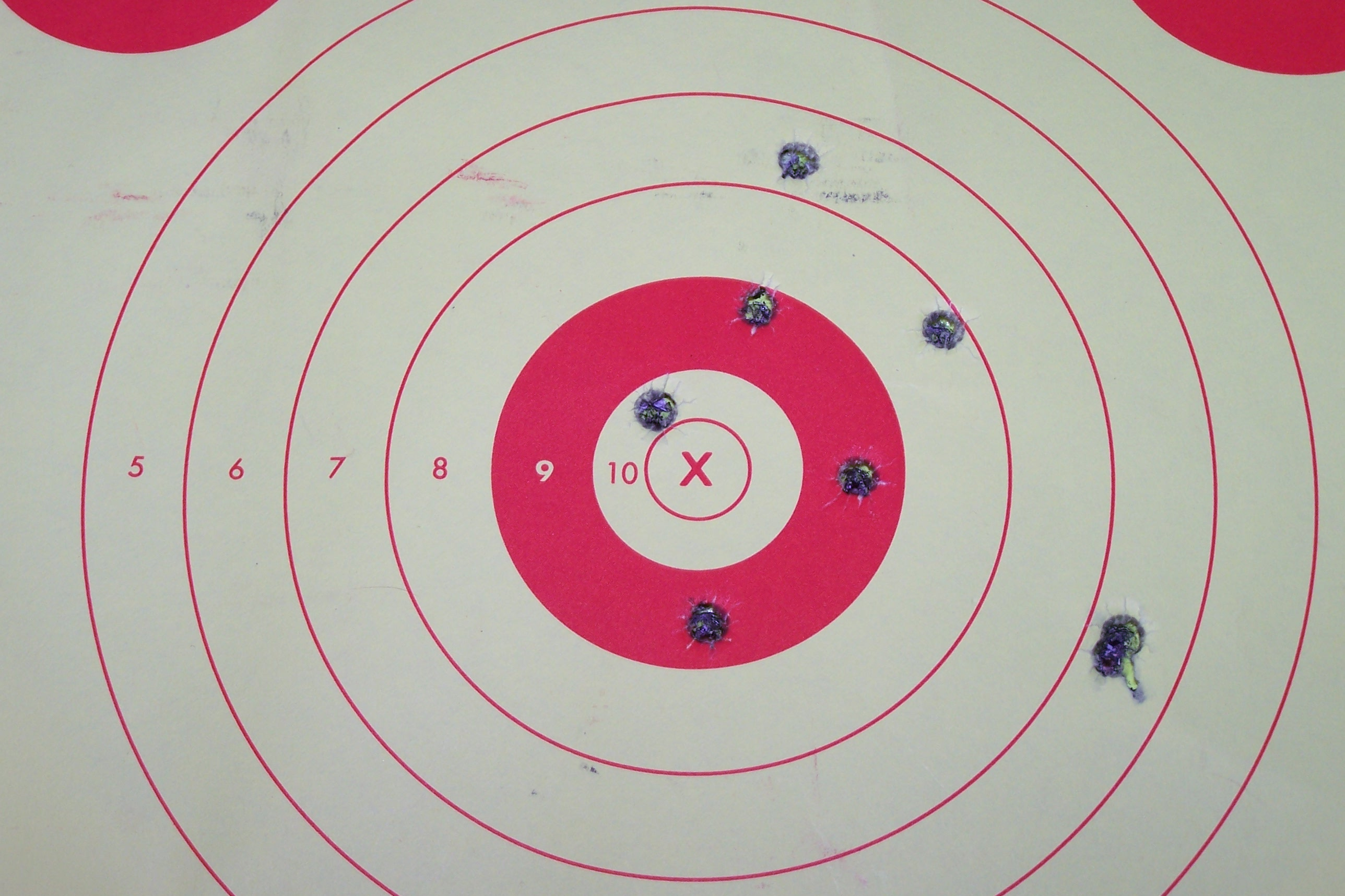

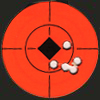

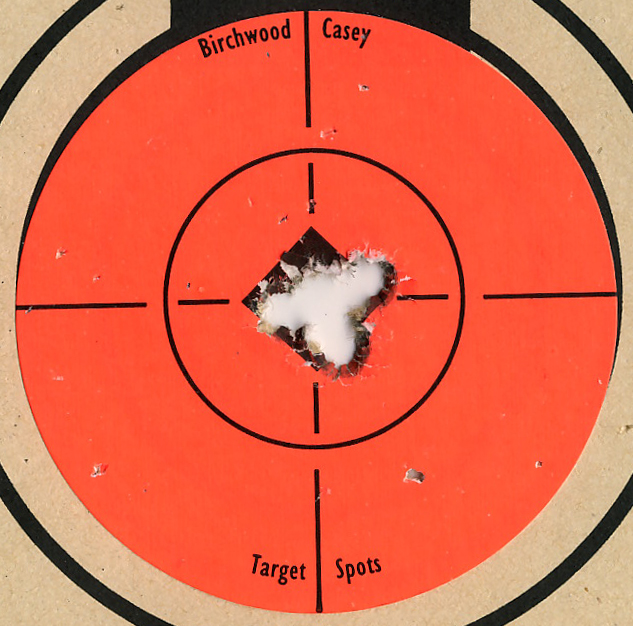

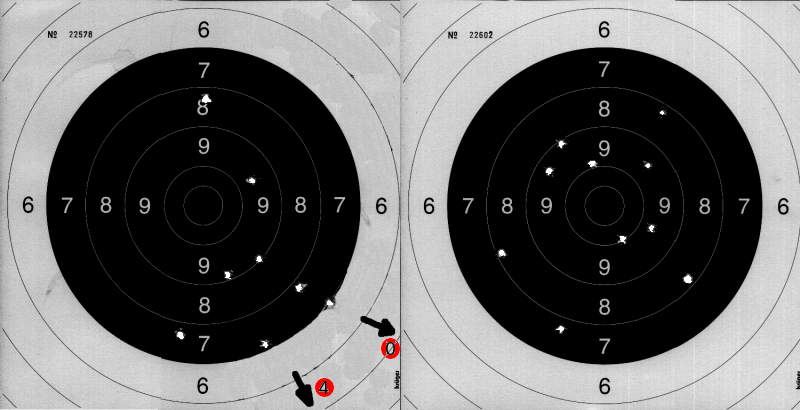

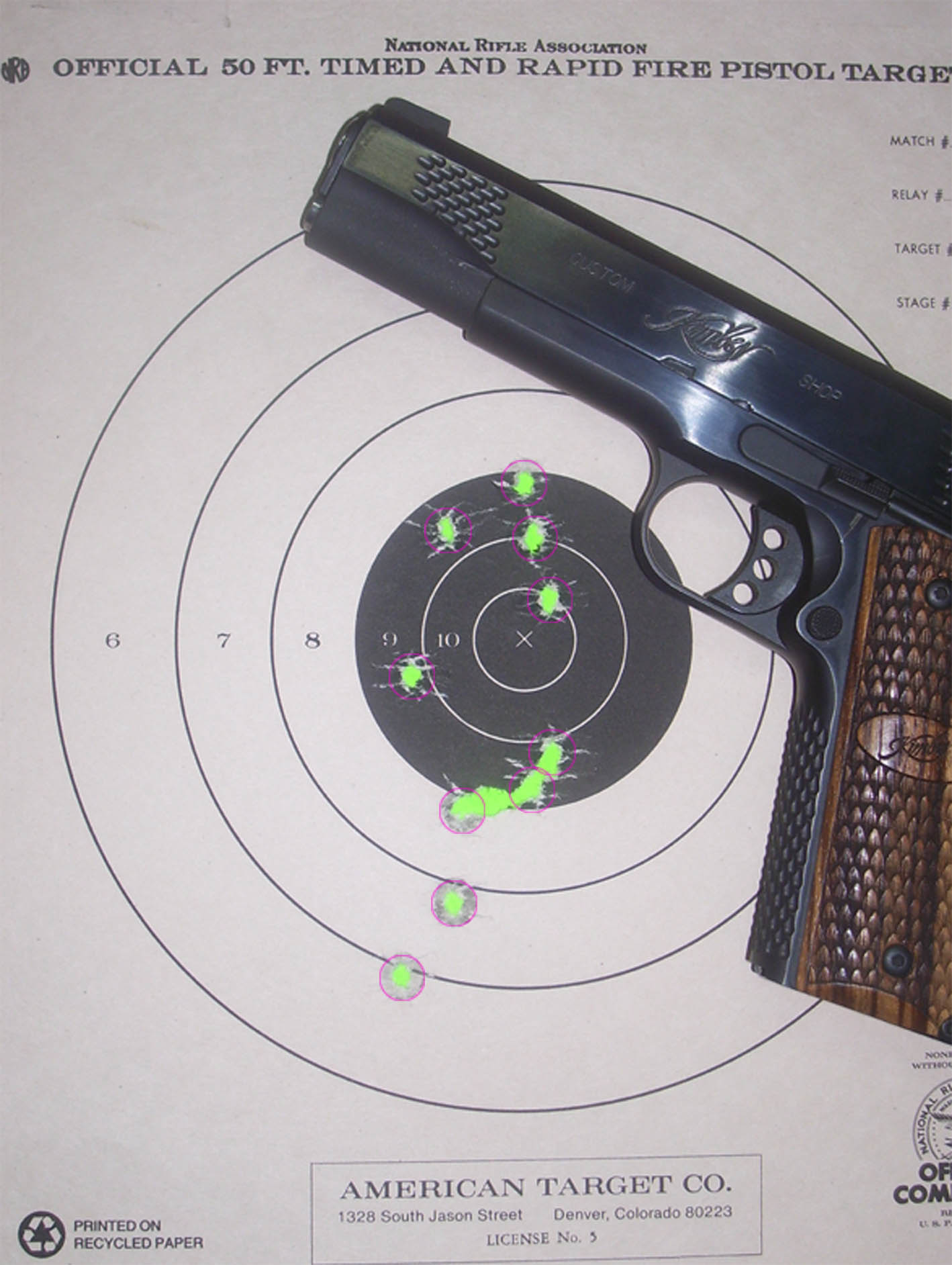

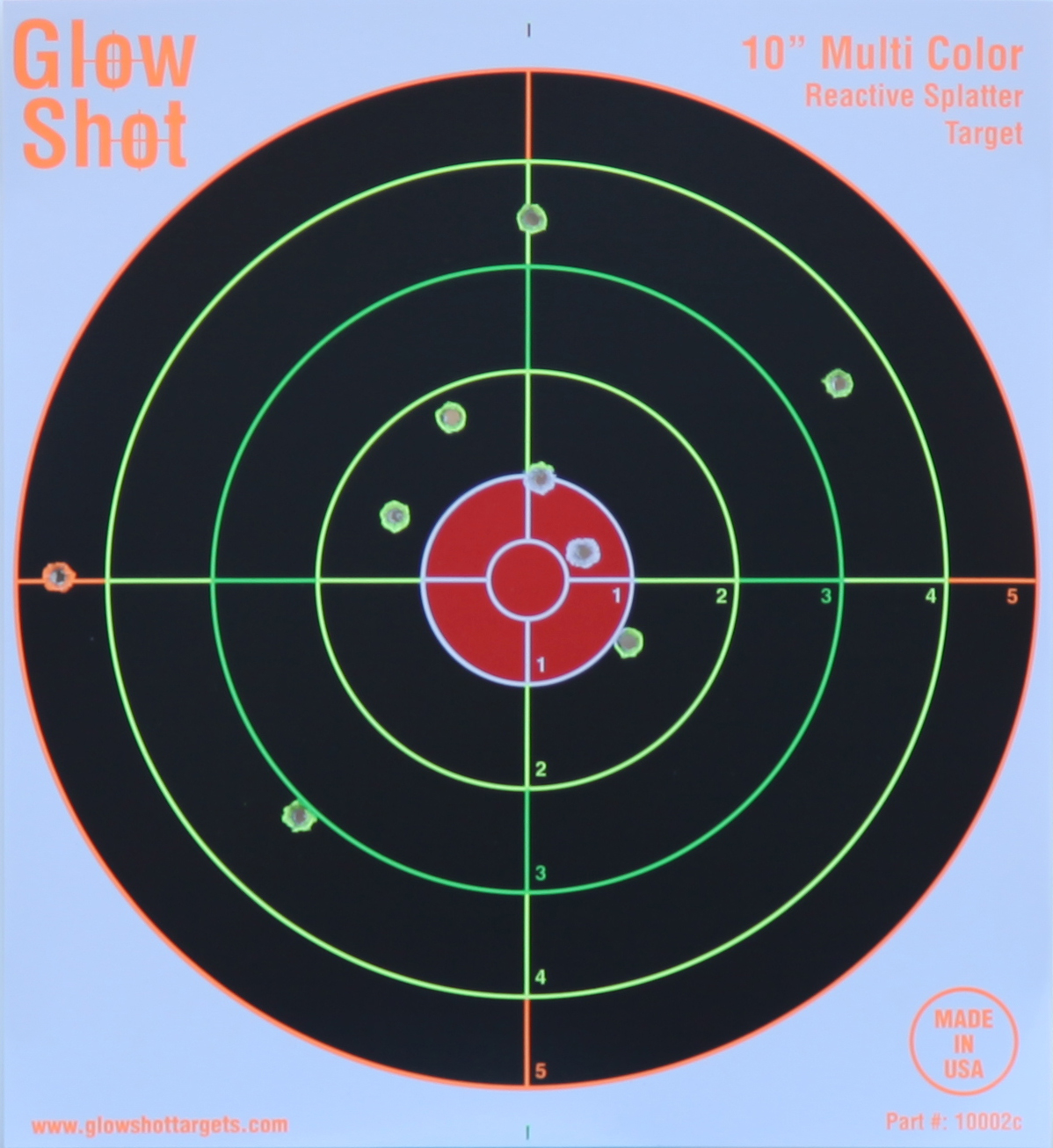

=== by Realism ===
- 2D
  - paper or metal silhouettes
  - photographs of public figures
- 3D - usually models of real life animals in archery.

=== by Color ===
Mostly important for paper targets.

- yellow, red, blue, black and white rings
- yellow, red and blue rings
- yellow and black rings
- white and black rings
- ...

== Archery sports ==
=== World Archery Federation ===
FITA targets are used in archery shooting competitions within the World Archery Federation. The targets have 10 evenly spaced concentric rings, generally with score values from 1 through 10. In addition there is an inner 10 ring, sometimes called the X ring. This becomes the 10 ring at indoor compound competitions, while outdoors, it serves as a tiebreaker with the archer scoring the most X's winning. The number of hits may also be taken into account as another tiebreaker. In FITA archery, targets are coloured as follows:

- 1 & 2 ring: White
- 3 & 4 ring: Black
- 5 & 6 ring: Blue
- 7 & 8 ring: Red
- 9, 10 & inner 10 (X) ring: Gold
The FITA target is used in target archery by the World Archery Federation.

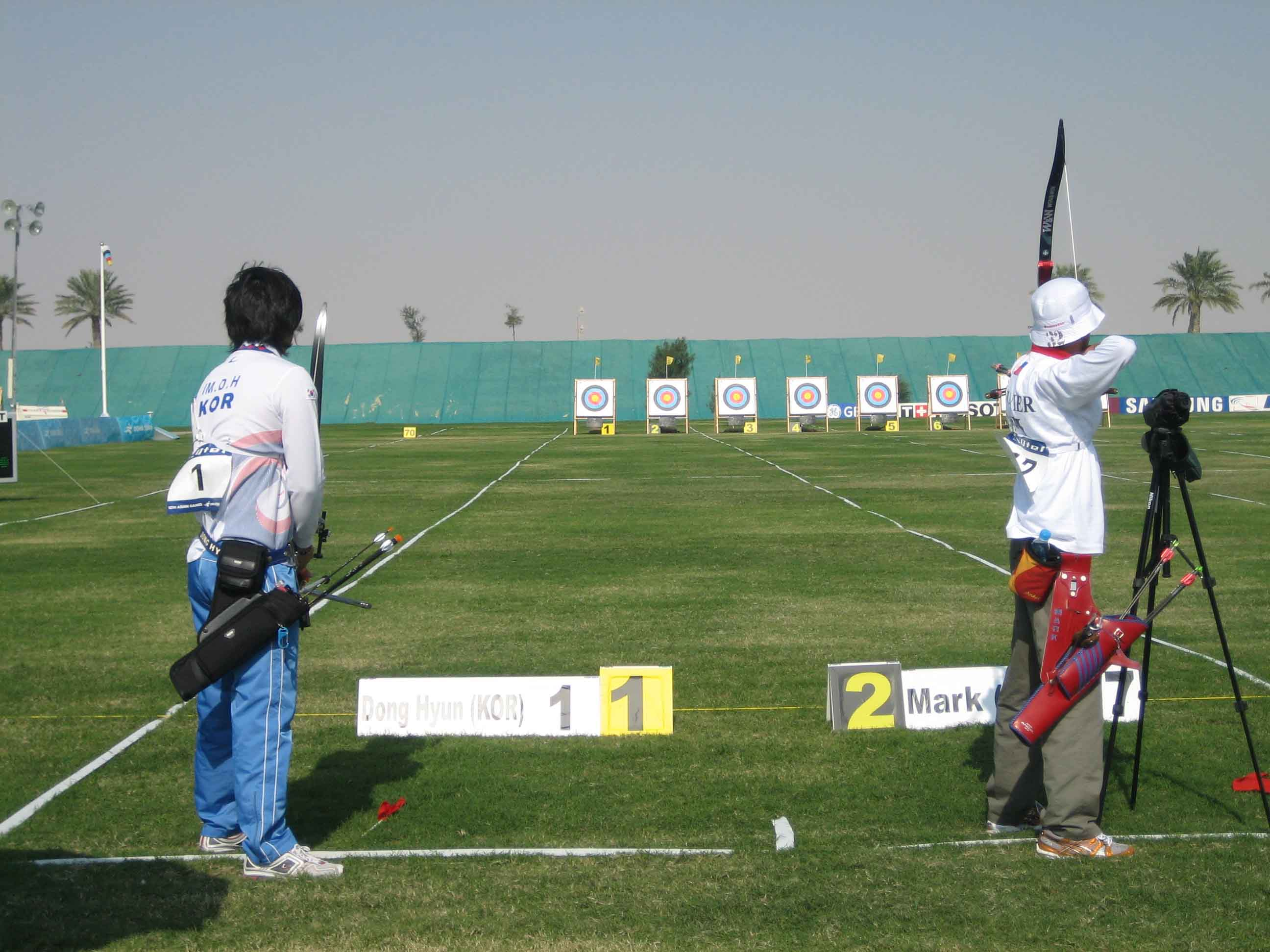
Archery range equipped with FITA targets in Doha, Qatar.

=== 3D archery targets ===
3D targets are life-size models of game used in field archery.

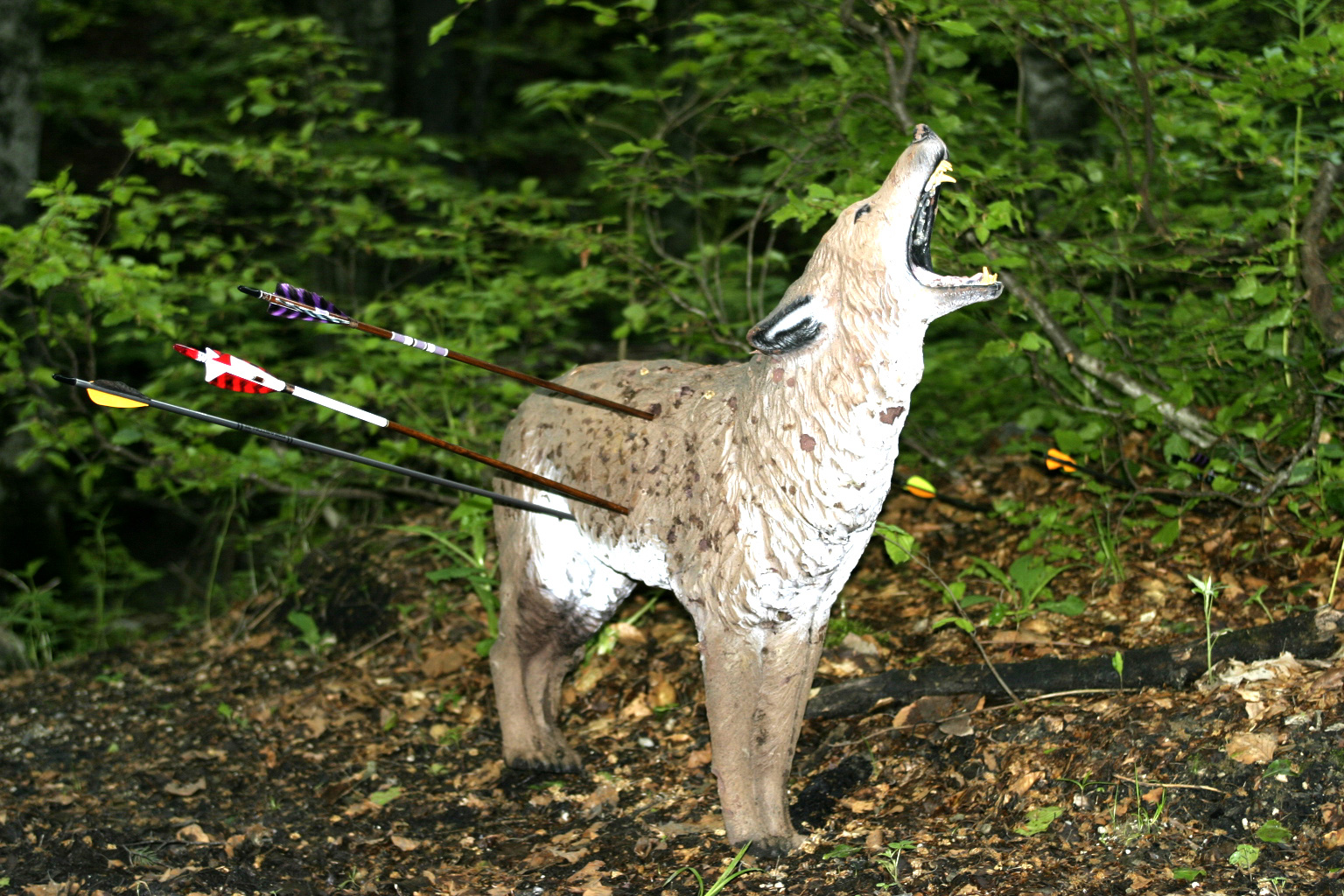
A coyote "3D target".

== Dart ==
Dart targets are a special form of bullseye targets.

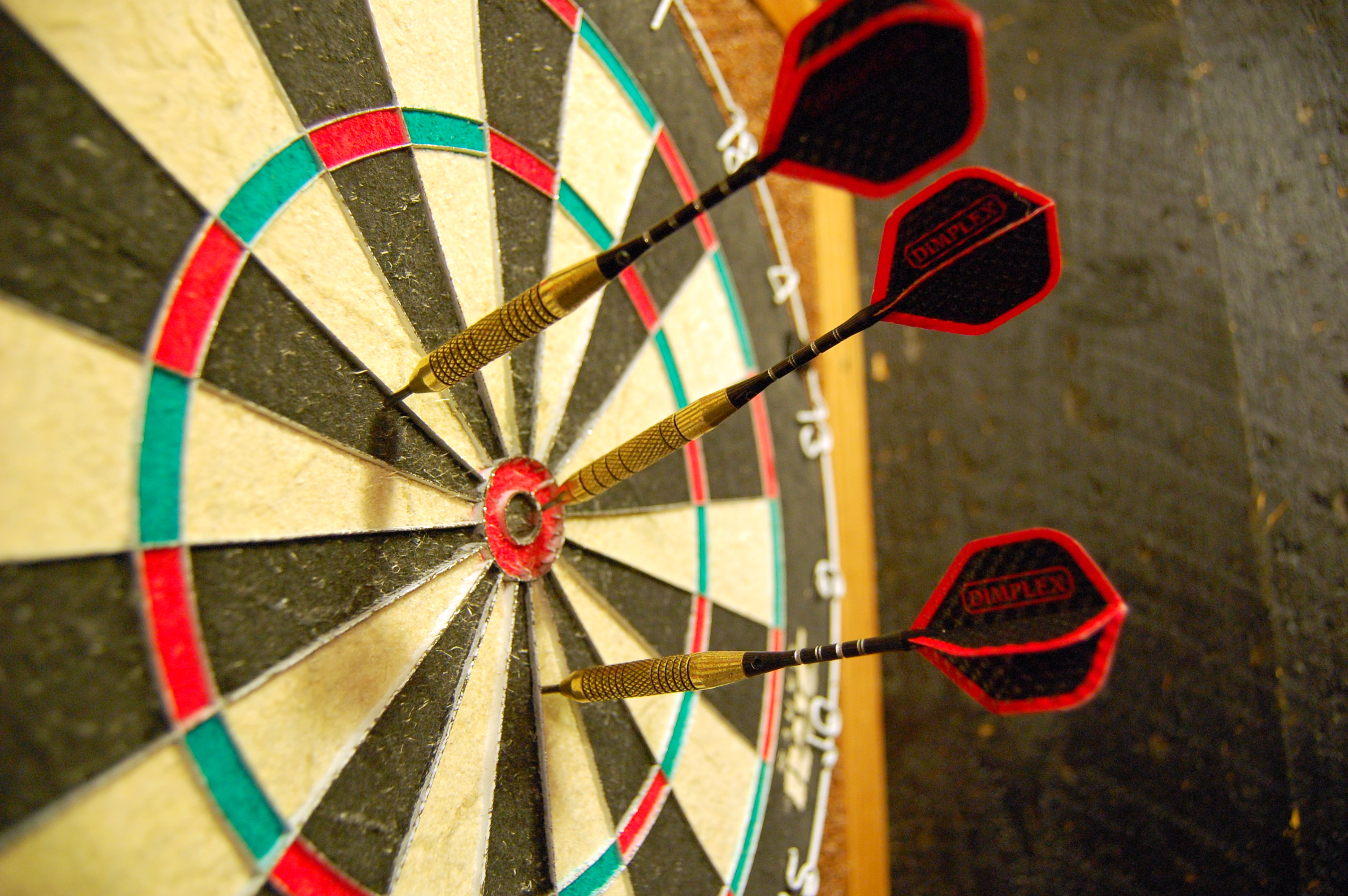
Darts in a bullseye target

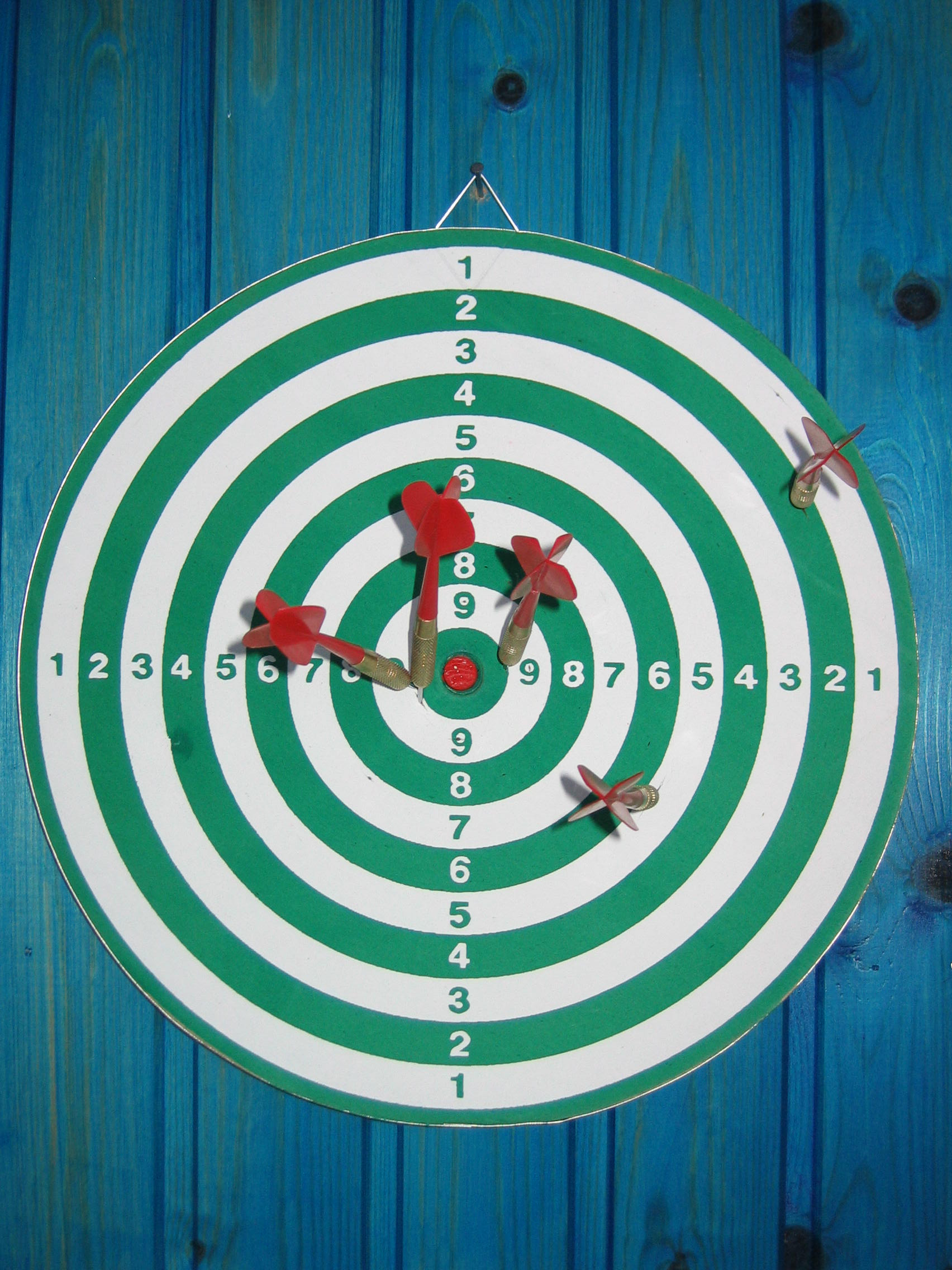

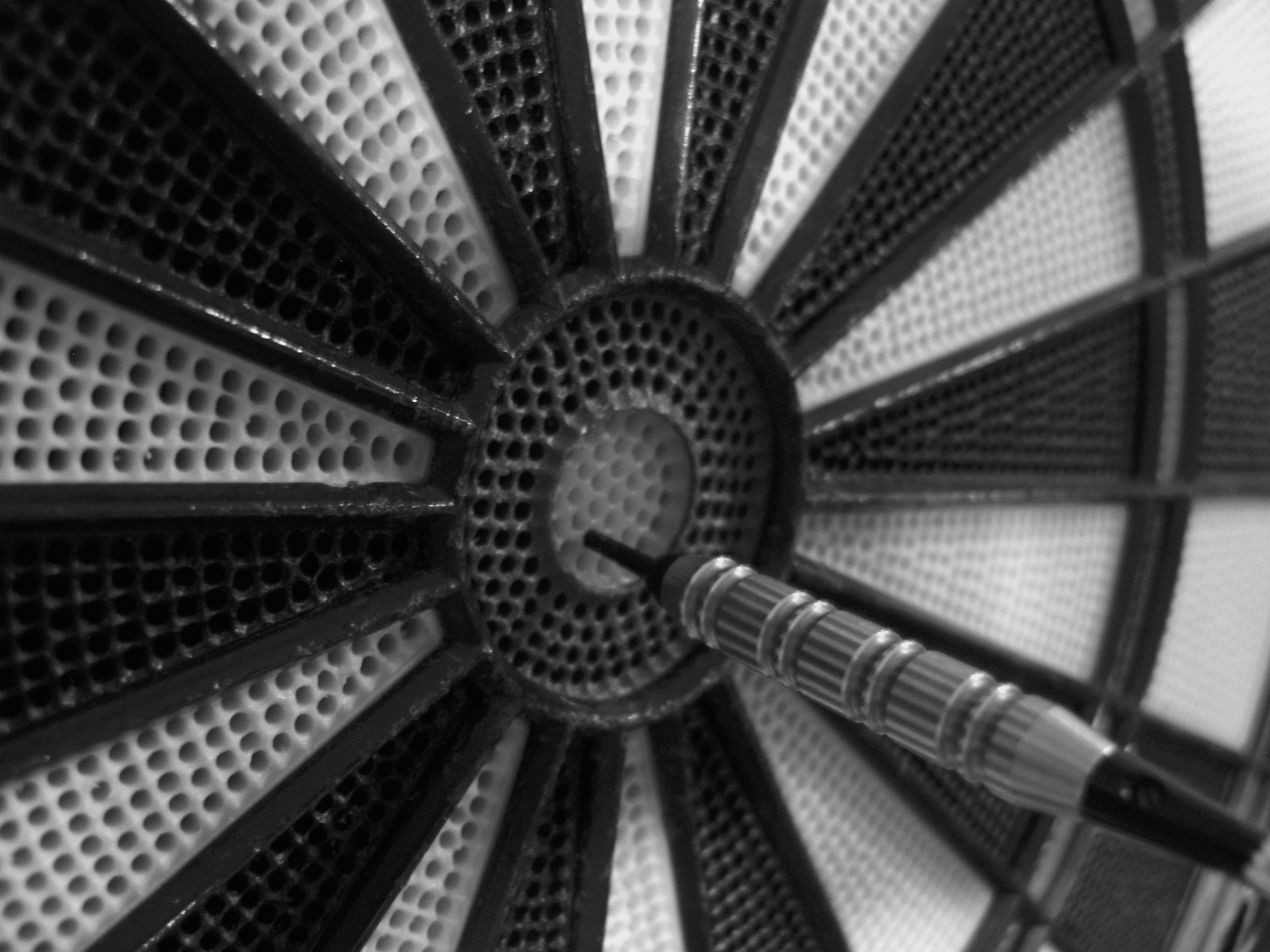

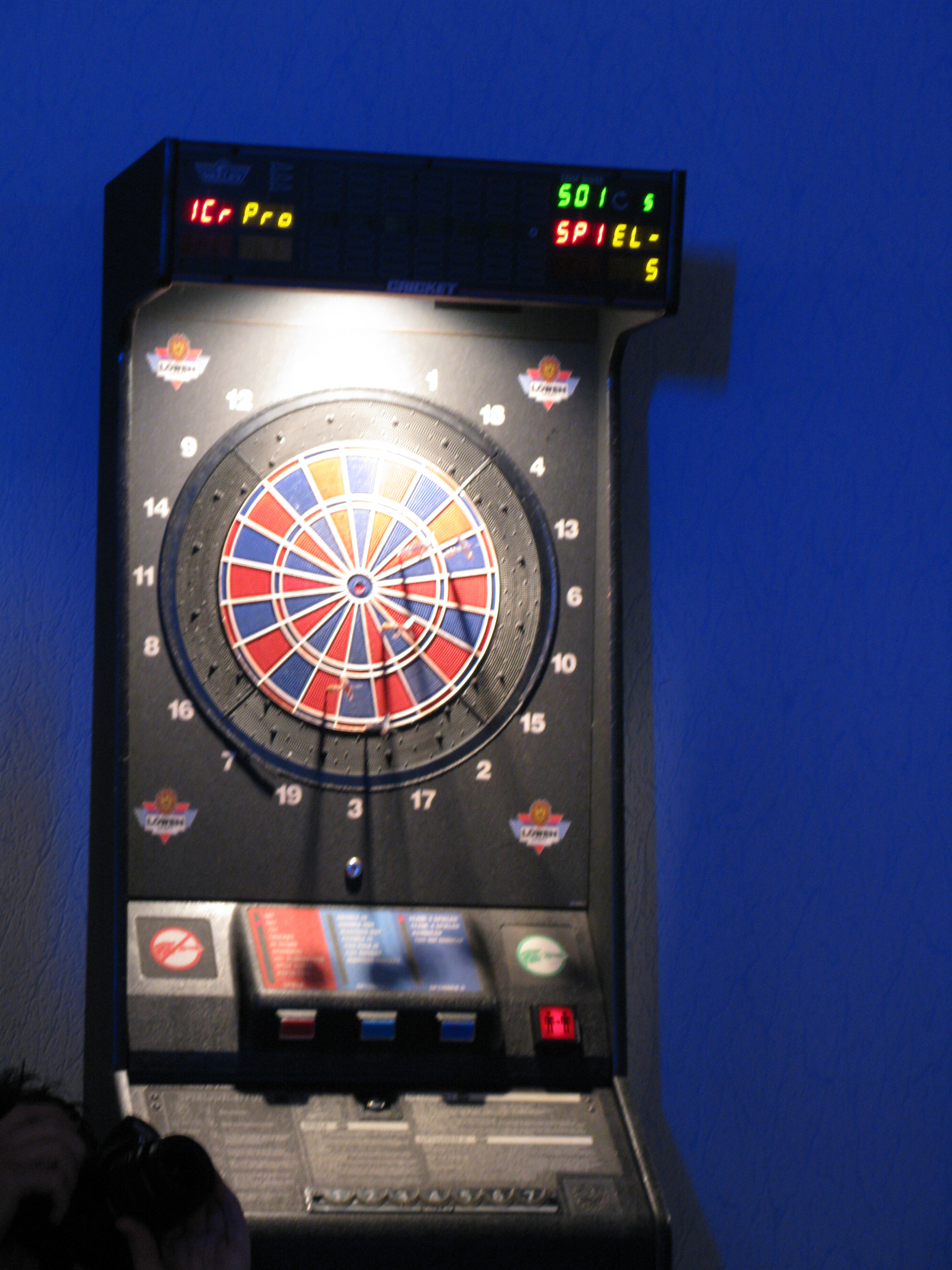

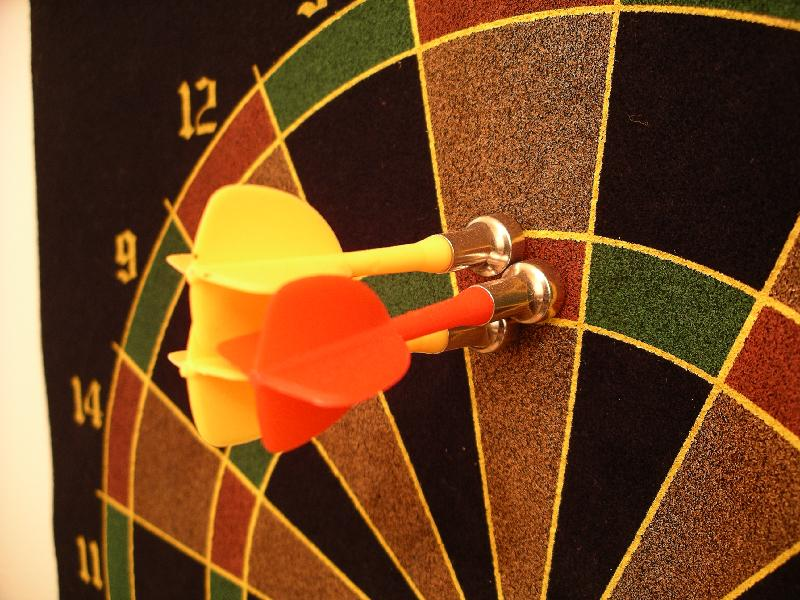

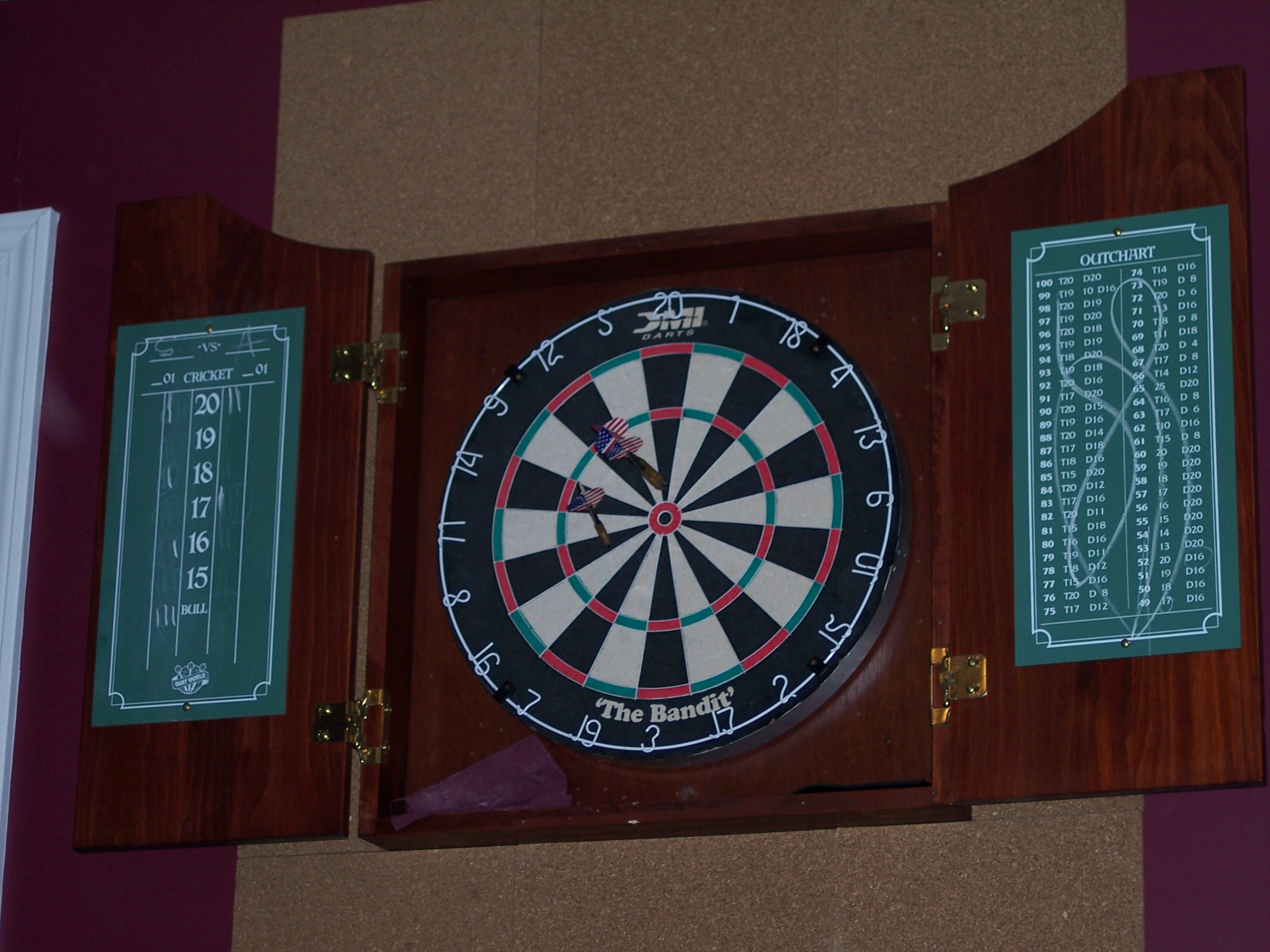

== Firearm sports ==
=== Air rifle field targets ===
In the outdoor air gun discipline field target metal targets of various shape and forms are used. The metal plates are often shaped to resemble small game animals, although there is currently a move towards simple geometric shapes.

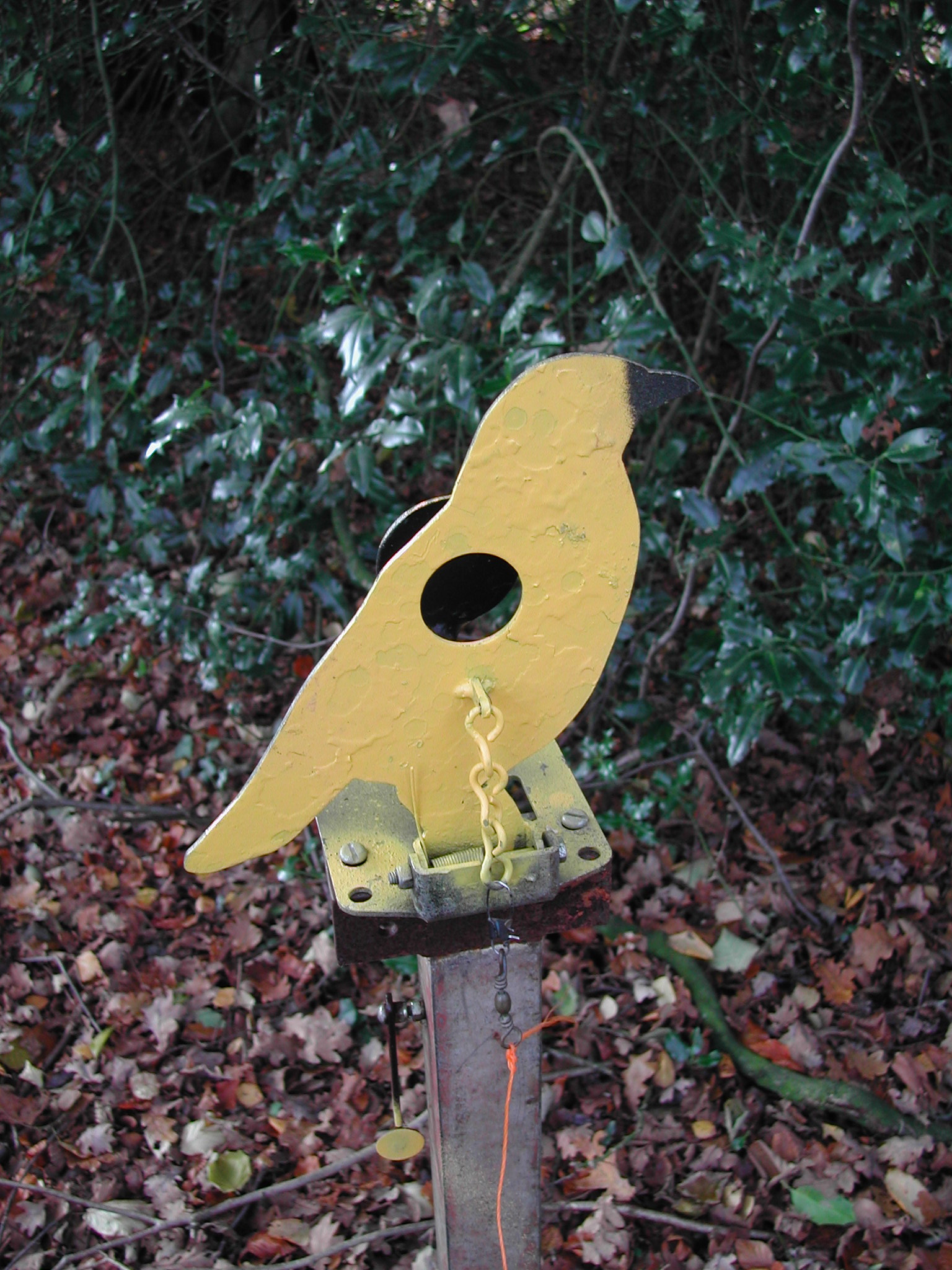
A crow-shaped, knock-over metal air gun field target. The black painted metal paddle must be hit to make the target fall over, and the target can be reset by pulling the orange cord attached to the face-plate.

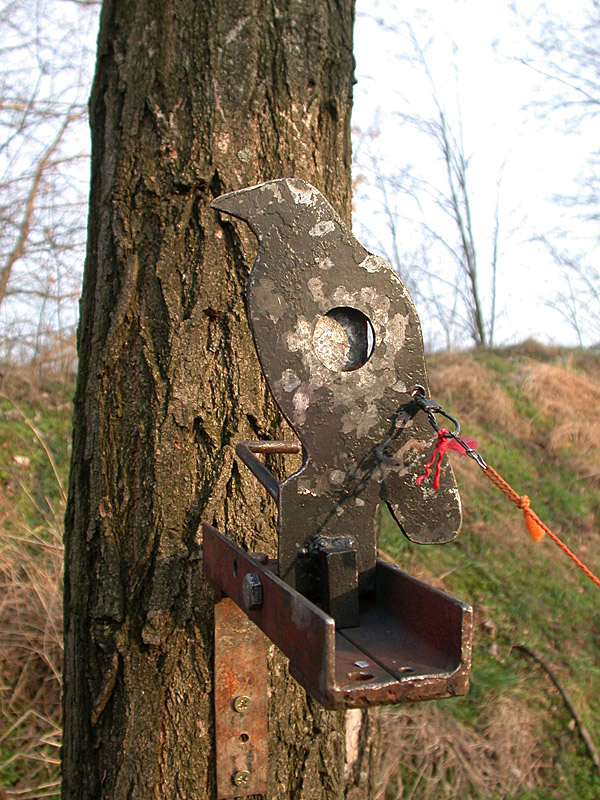
Another crow-shaped, knock-over metal air gun field target. The black painted metal paddle must be hit to make the target fall over, and the target can be reset by pulling the orange cord attached to the face-plate.

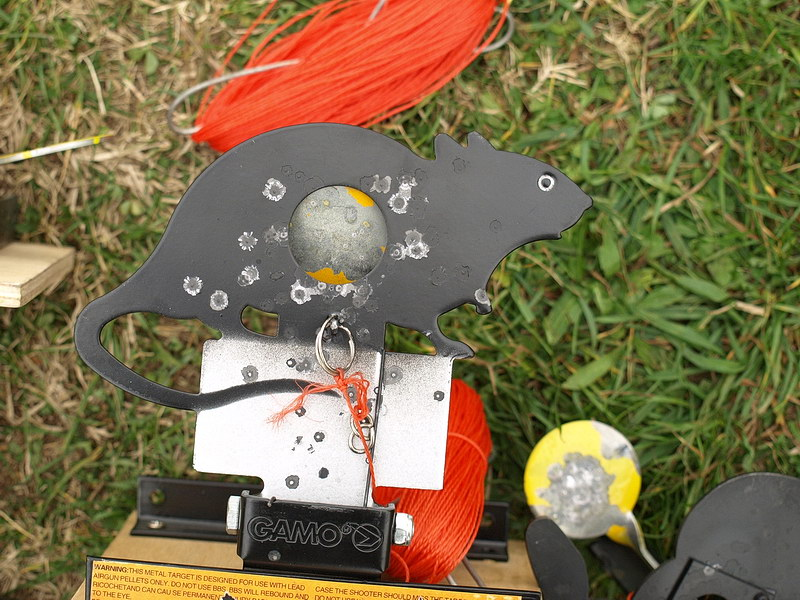
A rat knock-over metal air gun field target.

=== Clay pigeons ===
Clay pigeons are clay discs thrown into the air to imitate flying game birds for various clay pigeon shooting disciplines (e.g. trap, skeet, sporting clays). Formerly known as "inanimate bird shooting" until 1903 when "clay bird shooting" took over as the official nomenclature. (Note: See also Clay pigeon shooting§History)

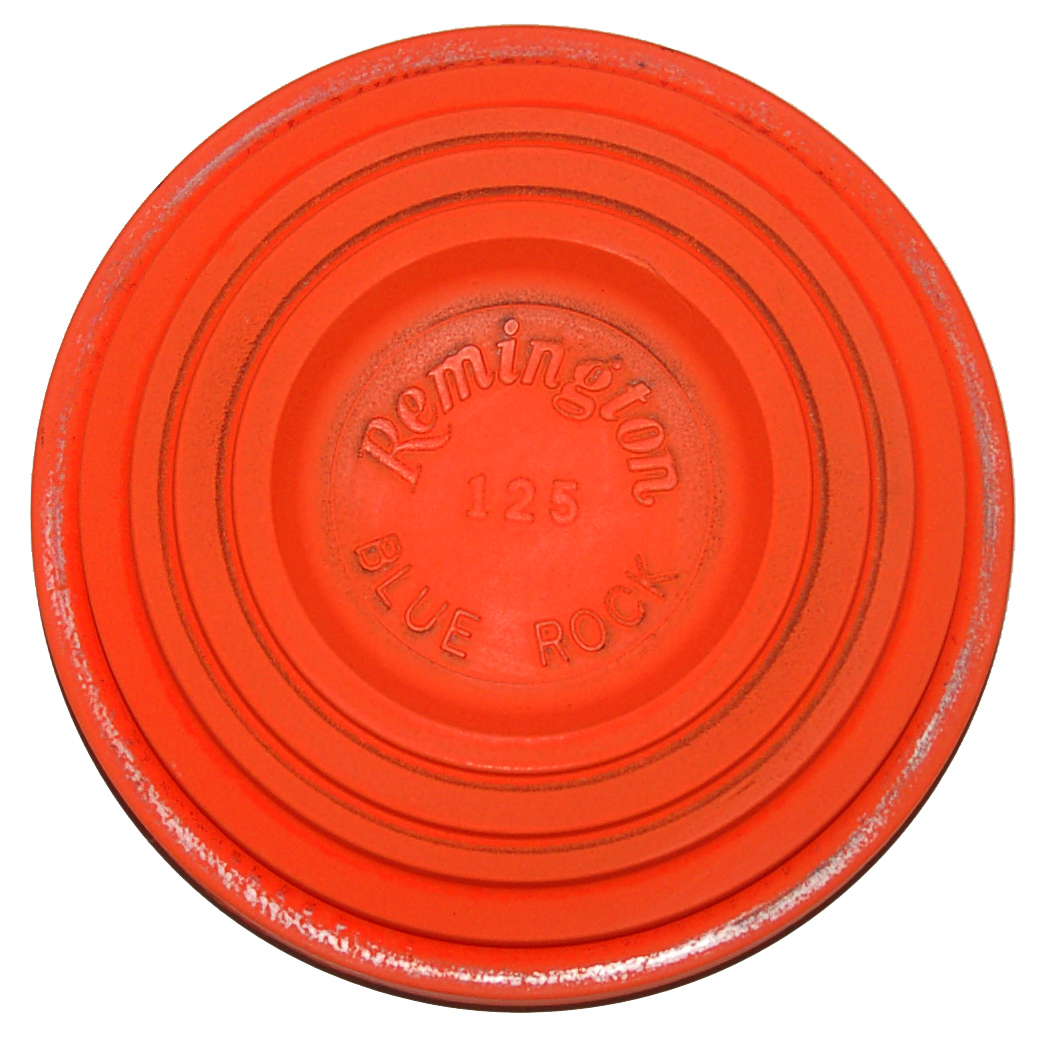
A 10 centimetres (4 in) clay pigeon.

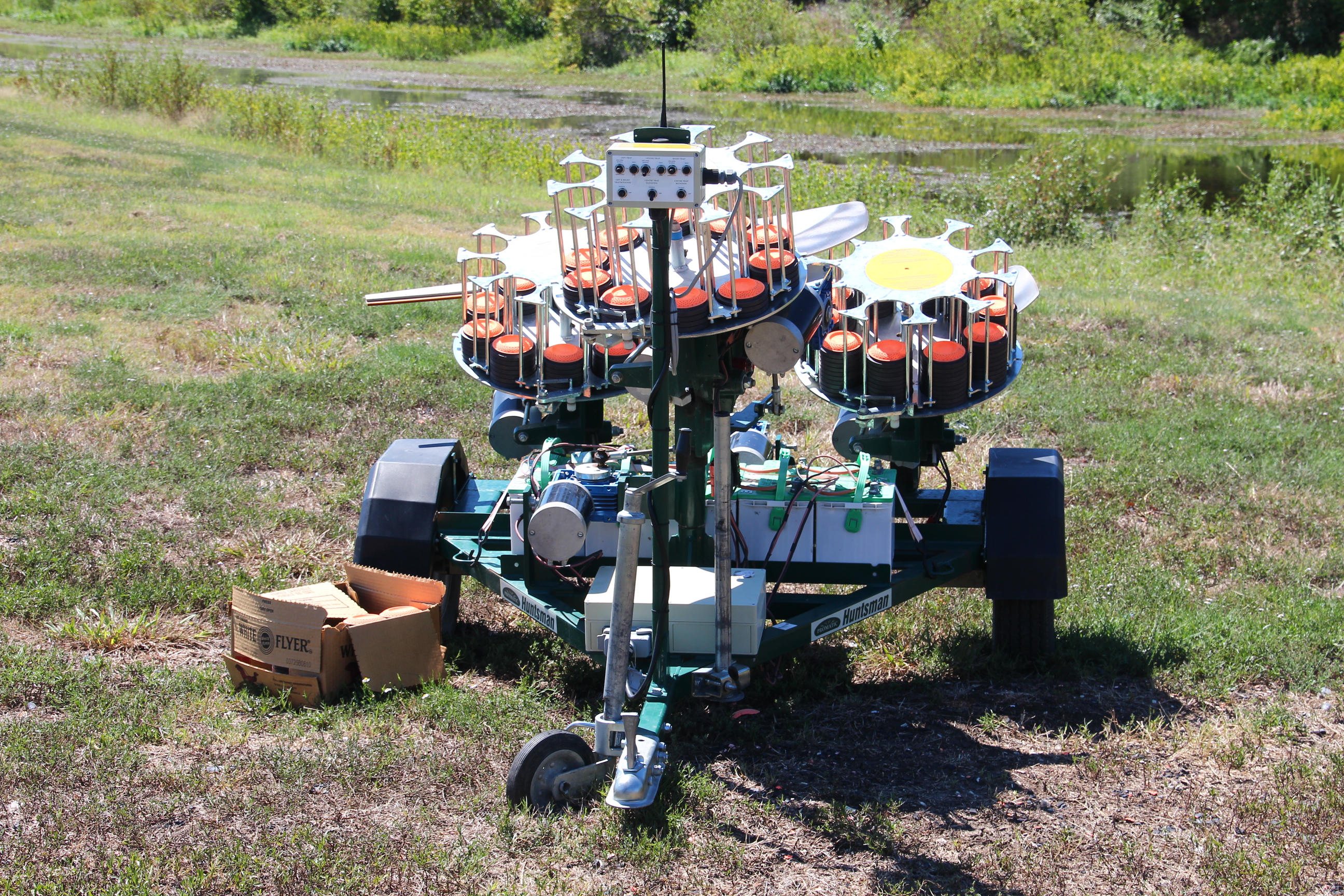
Clay pigeon throwing machine.

=== International Confederation of Fullbore Rifle Associations ===
In fullbore target rifle within the International Confederation of Fullbore Rifle Associations (ICFRA), competitions can be held in either a short range or long range format, with distances either in yards or meters. F-Class shoots at the same targets as Palma, but during the scoring process an extra inner ring (which is half the diameter of the V-bull) counts only for F-Class. While short range is shot at a different target size for each of the six distances, long range is shot at the one and same type of target at different distances. Below are the official target sizes, and approximate subtensions in milliradians and arcminutes depending on distance.

Metric ICFRA International Match Targets and F-Class Targets (Short Range)
at metric distances:

	(image missing)		(image missing)		(image missing)		(image missing)	
	300 m		400 m		500 m		600 m	
	Subtension	Angular size	Subtension	Angular size	Subtension	Angular size	Subtension	Angular size
Aiming Mark	600 mm	2.0 mrad	800 mm	2.0 mrad	1000 mm	2.0 mrad	1000 mm	1.7 mrad
Extra inner ring (F-Class only)	35 mm	0.1 mrad	47.5 mm	0.1 mrad	72.5 mm	0.1 mrad	80 mm	0.1 mrad
V-Bull	70 mm	0.2 mrad	95 mm	0.2 mrad	145 mm	0.3 mrad	160 mm	0.3 mrad
Bull	140 mm	0.5 mrad	185 mm	0.5 mrad	290 mm	0.6 mrad	320 mm	0.5 mrad
Inner	280 mm	0.9 mrad	375 mm	0.9 mrad	660 mm	1.3 mrad	660 mm	1.1 mrad
Magpie	420 mm	1.4 mrad	560 mm	1.4 mrad	1000 mm	2.0 mrad	1000 mm	1.7 mrad
Outer	600 mm	2.0 mrad	800 mm	2.0 mrad	1320 mm	2.6 mrad	1320 mm	2.2 mrad

Metric ICFRA International Match Targets and F-Class Targets (Short Range)
at imperial distances:

	(image missing)		(image missing)		(image missing)		(image missing)	
	300 yds		400 yds		500 yds		600 yds	
	Subtension	Angular size	Subtension	Angular size	Subtension	Angular size	Subtension	Angular size
Aiming Mark	560 mm	7.02 moa	745 mm	7.00 moa	915 mm	6.88 moa	915 mm	5.73 moa
Extra inner ring (F-Class only)	32.5 mm	0.41 moa	42.5 mm	0.40 moa	65 mm	0.49 moa	72.5 mm	0.45 moa
V-Bull	65 mm	0.81 moa	85 mm	0.80 moa	130 mm	0.98 moa	145 mm	0.91 moa
Bull	130 mm	1.63 moa	175 mm	1.64 moa	260 mm	1.95 moa	290 mm	1.82 moa
Inner	260 mm	3.26 moa	350 mm	3.29 moa	600 mm	4.51 moa	600 mm	3.76 moa
Magpie	390 mm	4.89 moa	520 mm	4.89 moa	915 mm	6.88 moa	915 mm	5.73 moa
Outer	560 mm	7.02 moa	745 mm	7.00 moa	1320 mm	9.93 moa	1320 mm	8.27 moa

The Metric ICFRA International Match Target and F-Class Target (Long Range)
at metric and imperial distances:

	(image missing)						
	Subtension	Angular sizes					
	Subtension	700 m	800 yds 731.52 m	800 m	900 yds 822.96 m	900 m	1000 yds 914.4 m
Aiming Mark	1120 mm	1.6 mrad	1.5 mrad	1.4 mrad	1.4 mrad	1.2 mrad	1.2 mrad
Extra inner ring (F-Class only)	128 mm	0.18 mrad	0.18 mrad	0.16 mrad	0.16 mrad	0.14 mrad	0.14 mrad
V-Bull	255 mm	0.4 mrad	0.3 mrad	0.3 mrad	0.3 mrad	0.3 mrad	0.3 mrad
Bull	510 mm	0.7 mrad	0.7 mrad	0.6 mrad	0.6 mrad	0.6 mrad	0.6 mrad
Inner	815 mm	1.2 mrad	1.1 mrad	1.0 mrad	1.0 mrad	0.9 mrad	0.9 mrad
Magpie	1120 mm	1.6 mrad	1.5 mrad	1.4 mrad	1.4 mrad	1.2 mrad	1.2 mrad
Outer	1830 mm	2.6 mrad	2.5 mrad	2.3 mrad	2.2 mrad	2.0 mrad	2.0 mrad

=== International Practical Shooting Confederation ===
In matches organized by the International Practical Shooting Confederation, both steel and paper targets are used. Currently the only paper targets used for handgun is the IPSC Target (formerly Classic Target) and the 2/3 scaled down IPSC Mini Target (formerly IPSC Mini Classic Target). The center of these paper targets is called the A-zone. Additionally, for rifle and shotgun "A3" and "A4" paper targets and the "Universal Target" is used. For steel targets, standardized knock down targets called "poppers" are used. The two approved designs are the full size "IPSC Popper" (formerly IPSC Classic Popper) and the 2/3 scaled down version "IPSC Mini Popper" (formerly "IPSC Classic Mini Popper"), while the Pepper Popper and Mini Pepper Popper is now obsolete.

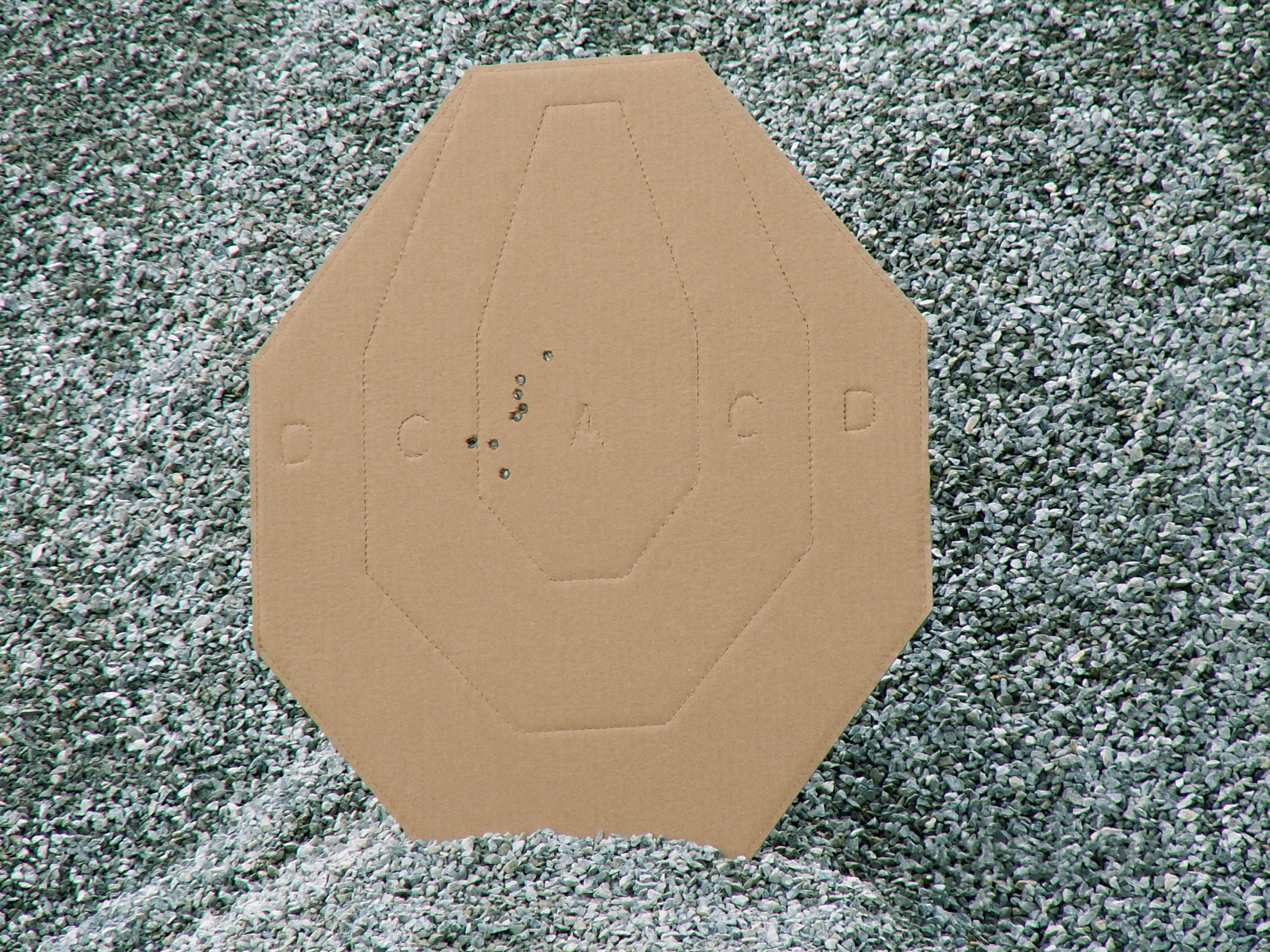
The octagonal IPSC Target (formerly known as the Classic Target) is a cardboard target used in all disciplines within the International Practical Shooting Confederation.

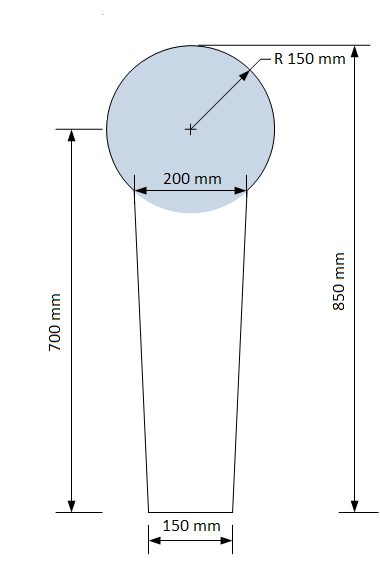
The full size IPSC Popper (formerly known as the Classic Popper).

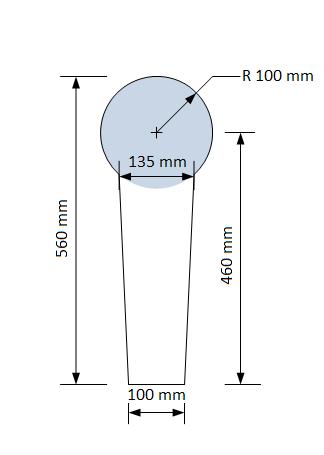
IPSC Mini Popper (formerly known as Classic Mini Popper), a 2/3 scaled down version of the IPSC Popper used to simulate greater distance.

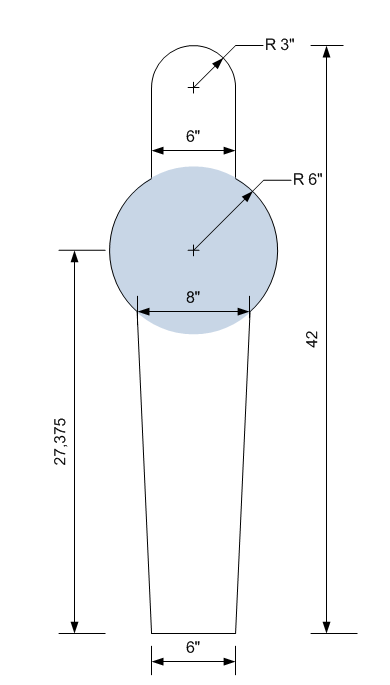
Pepper Popper, no longer used in IPSC competitions.

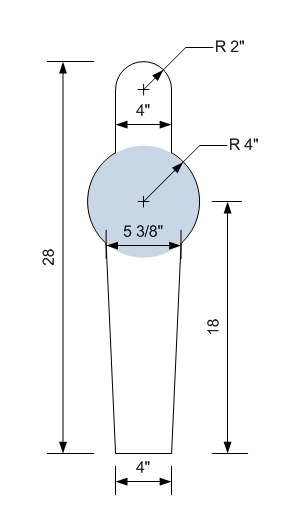
Mini Pepper Popper, no longer used in IPSC competitions.

=== International Shooting Sport Federation ===
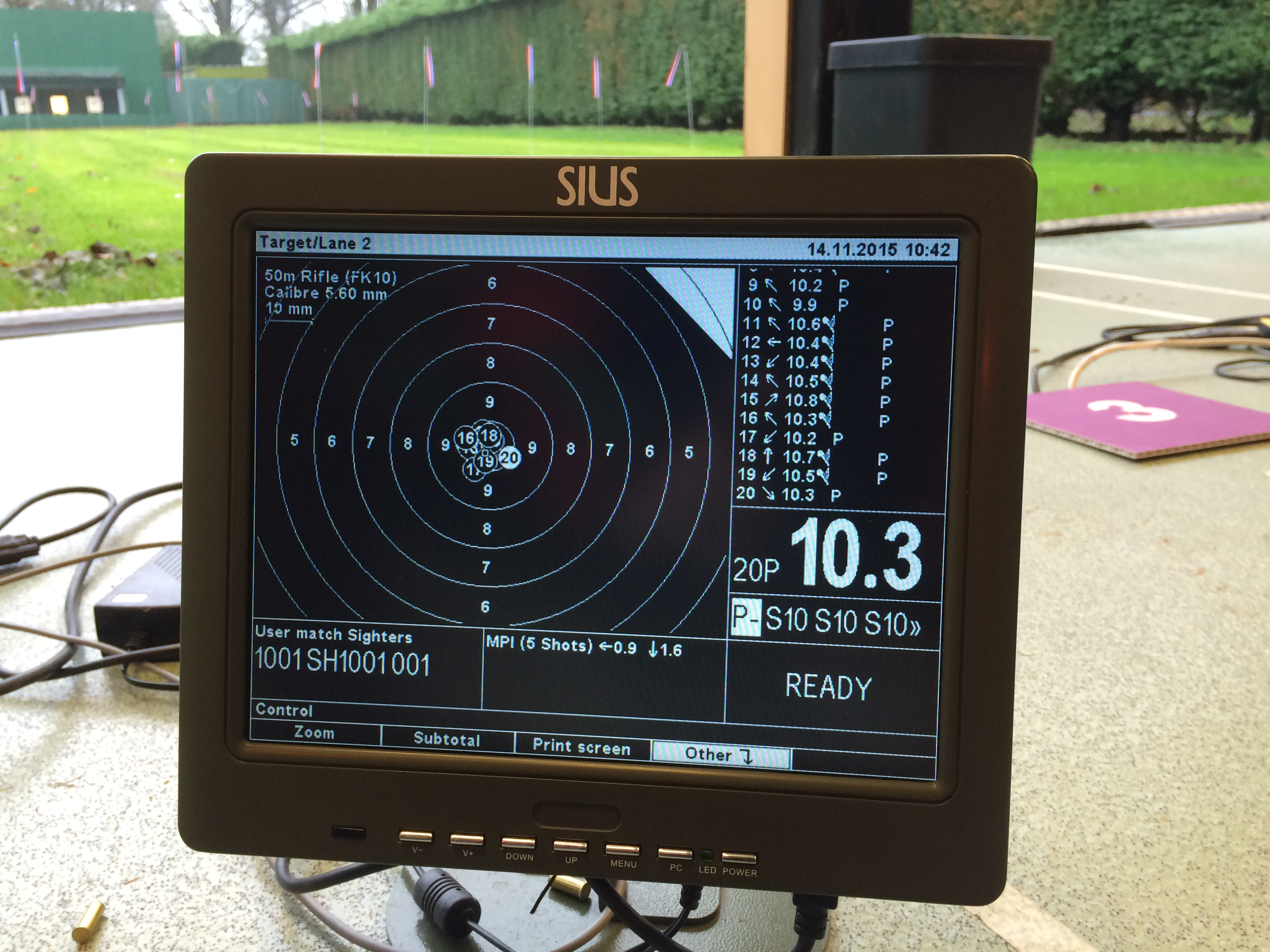
Sius Ascor electronic target monitor

Within International Shooting Sport Federation disciplines, variations on bullseye targets are used for rifle and pistol events. In international competition, electronic scoring targets (ESTs) have replaced physical paper targets, eliminating manual scoring. For shotgun disciplines, clay targets are used.

	25 m Rapid Fire Pistol		25 m Precision Pistol		50 Meter Pistol		10 Meter Air Pistol	
	Subtension	Angular size	Subtension	Angular size	Subtension	Angular size	Subtension	Angular size
Inner Ten	50 mm	2 mrad	25 mm	1 mrad	25 mm	0.5 mrad	5 mm	0.5 mrad
10 Ring	100 mm	4 mrad	50 mm	2 mrad	50 mm	1 mrad	11.5 mm	1.15 mrad
Subsequent; Ring Increase	80 mm	3.2 mrad	50 mm	2 mrad	50 mm	1 mrad	16 mm	1.6 mrad
Aiming mark	500 mm	20 mrad	200 mm	8 mrad	200 mm	4 mrad	59.5 mm	5.95 mrad

	(image missing)			
	50 m Running Target (Rifle)		10 m Running Target (Rifle)	
	Subtension	Angular size	Subtension	Angular size
Inner Ten	30 mm	0.6 mrad	0.5 mm	0.05 mrad
10 Ring	60 mm	1.2 mrad	5.5 mm	0.55 mrad
Subsequent; Ring Increase	34 mm	0.68 mrad	5 mm	0.5 mrad
Aiming mark			30.5 mm	3.05 mrad

	300 m Rifle		50 m Rifle		10 m Air Rifle	
	Subtension	Angular size	Subtension	Angular size	Subtension	Angular size
Inner Ten	50 mm	1/6 mrad ≈ 0.167 mrad	5 mm	0.1 mrad	(Determined by scoring gauge)	-
10 Ring	100 mm	1/3 mrad ≈ 0.33 mrad	10.4 mm	0.208 mrad	0.5 mm	0.05 mrad
Subsequent; Ring Increase	100 mm	1/3 mrad ≈ 0.33 mrad	16 mm	0.32 mrad	5 mm	0.5 mrad
Aiming mark	600 mm	2 mrad	≈ 95.7 mm	≈ 1.9 mrad	25.5	2.55 mrad

=== Metallic silhouette ===
In metallic silhouette shooting only knock down steel targets featuring animals are used.

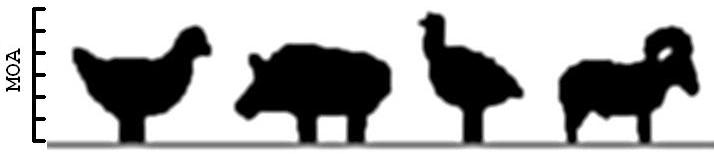
Metallic silhouette targets featuring a chicken, pig, turkey and ram, scaled to appear as they would if placed at the correct distances from the shooter. Scale in minutes of angle.

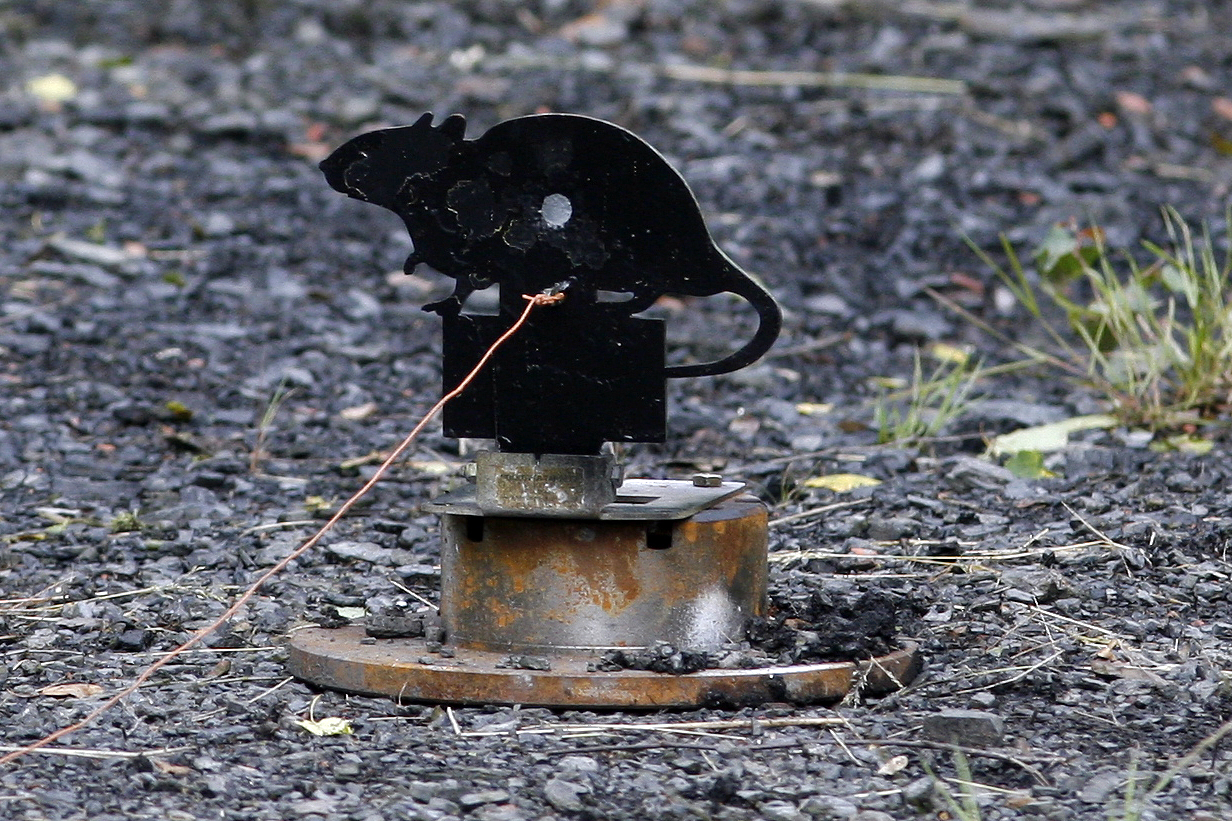
A Hunter Field Target (HFT) metallic target in the form of a Rat.

=== Popinjays ===
The Popinjay (from the French papegai, or "parrot") is an ancient form of target for crossbow shooting. Originally a bird tethered in a tree, it developed into a complex painted wood target atop a tall wooden pole. The popinjay would form the centrepiece of a major shooting contest and many shooters would try their skill repeatedly against the same target. Scoring was awarded for shooting off various parts of the target.

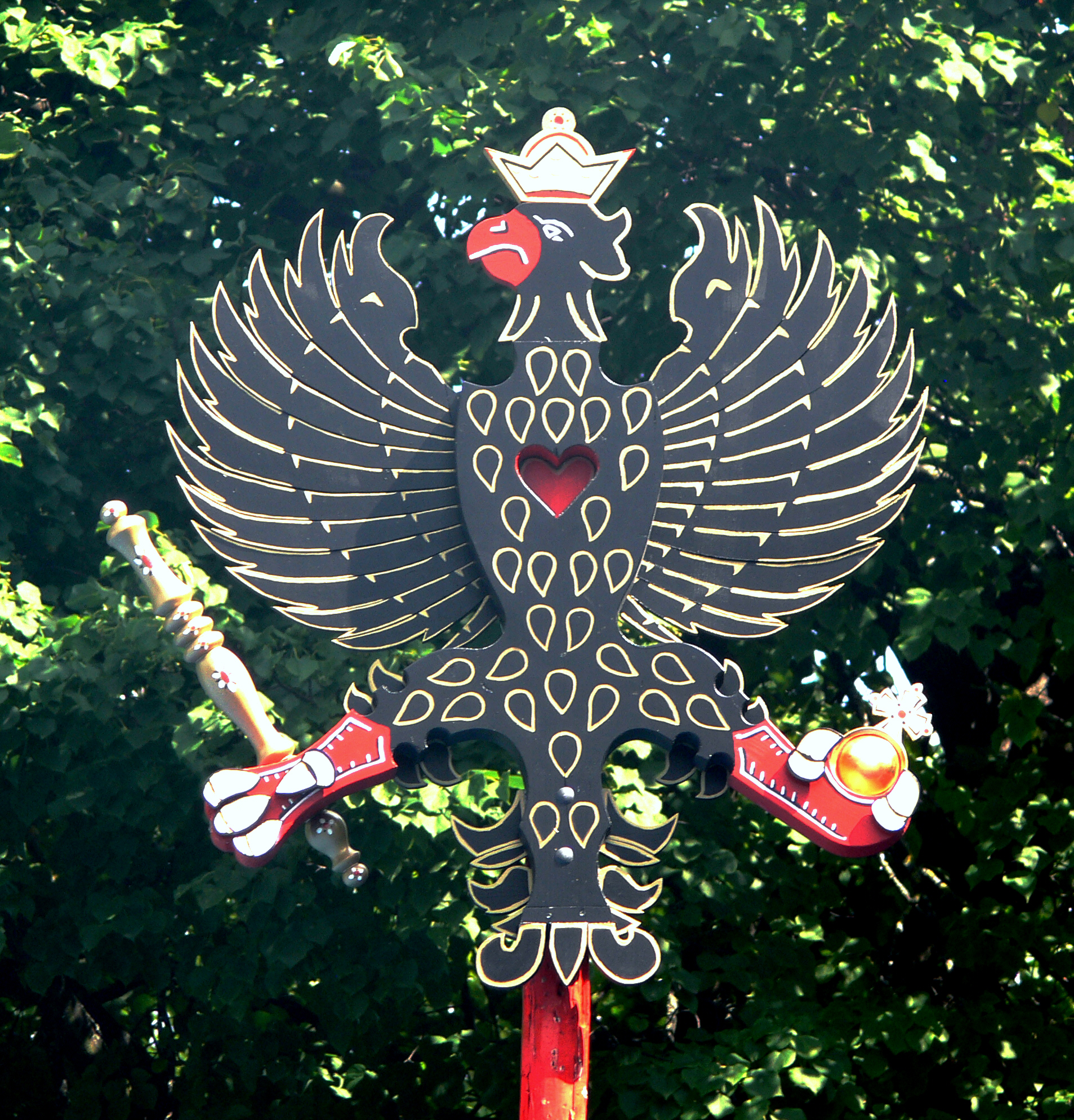
A Popinjay target used for Adler shooting during the 2010 Rutenfest Ravensburg festival in Germany

== Human silhouette ==
Human silhouette targets are use for military and police firearms training.

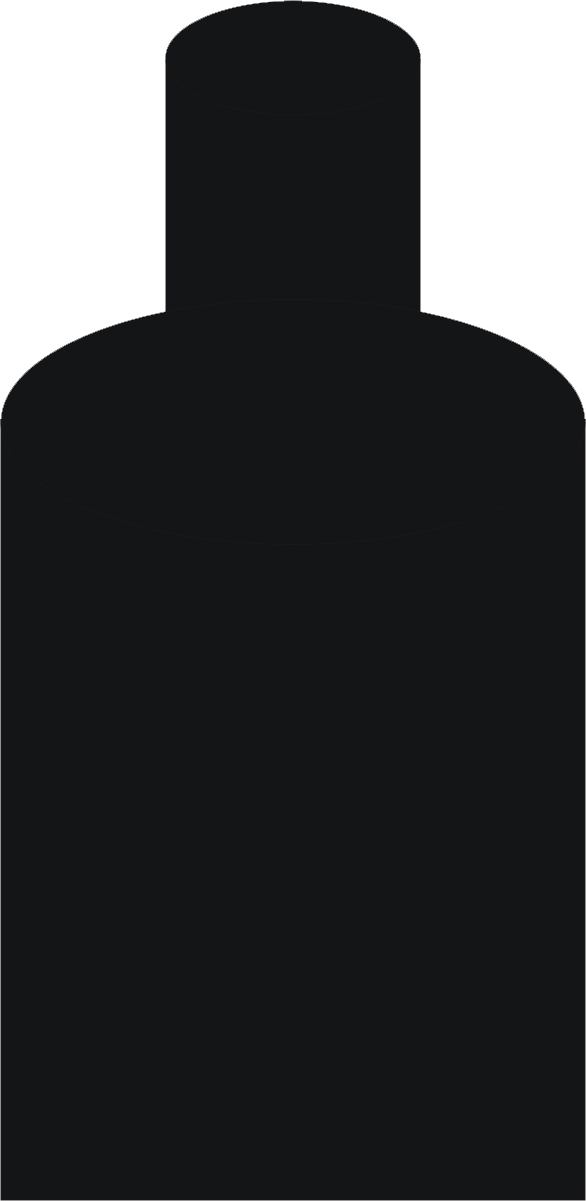
NATO E-type Silhouette Target

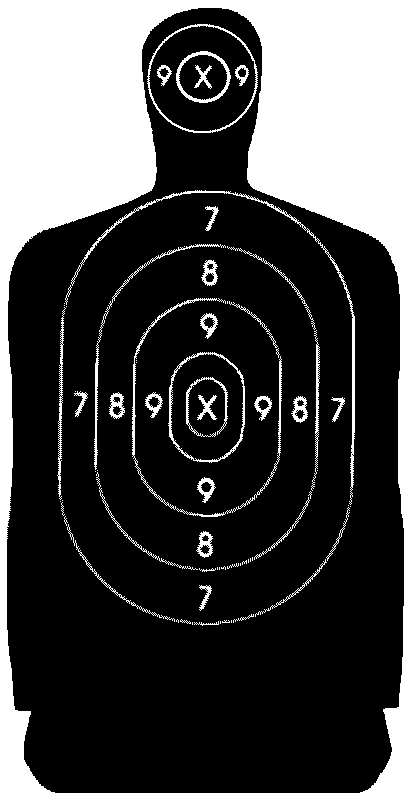
Human silhouette target

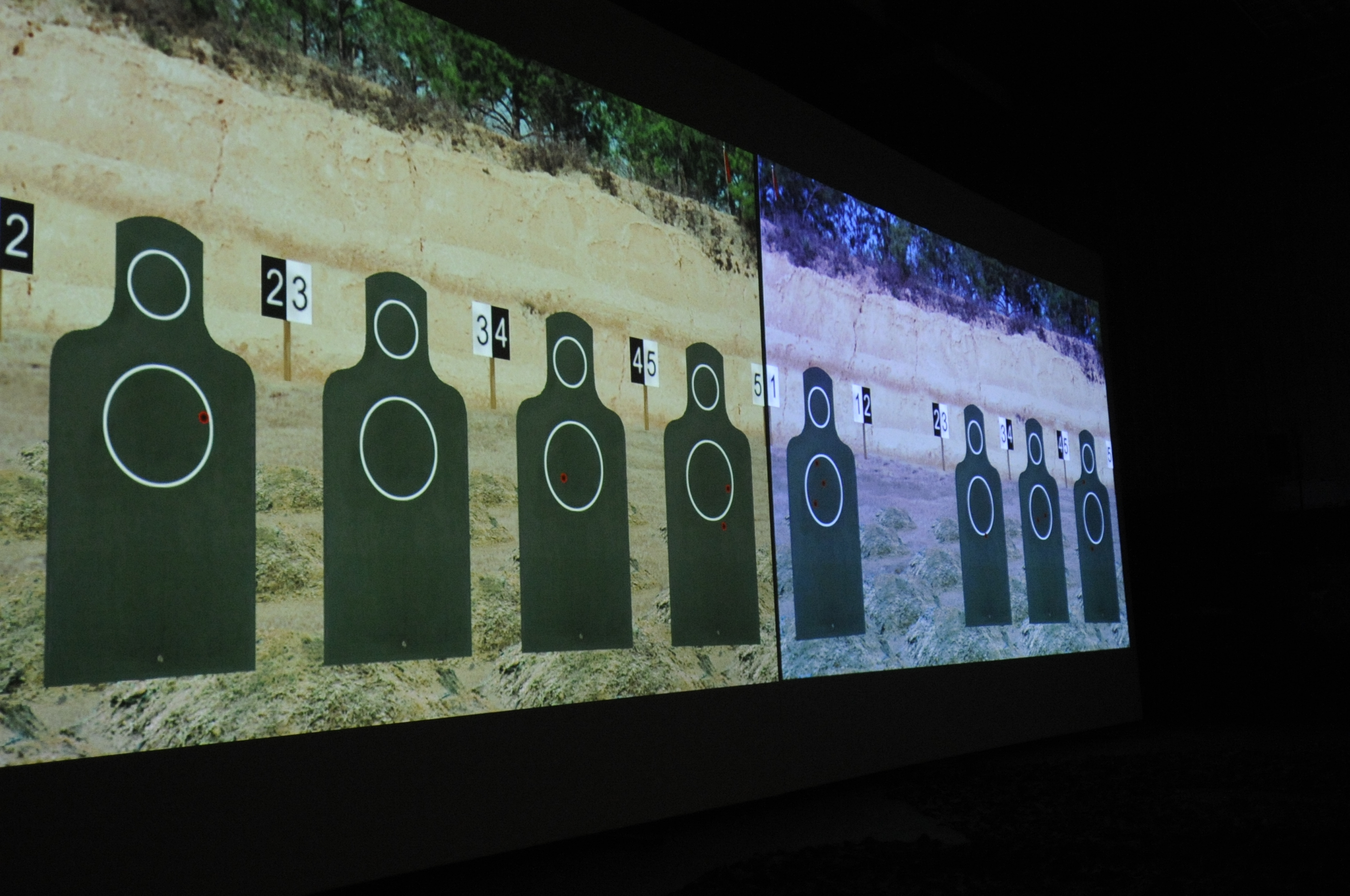
A digital target range at the firearms training simulator on Kunsan Air Base waits to be used.

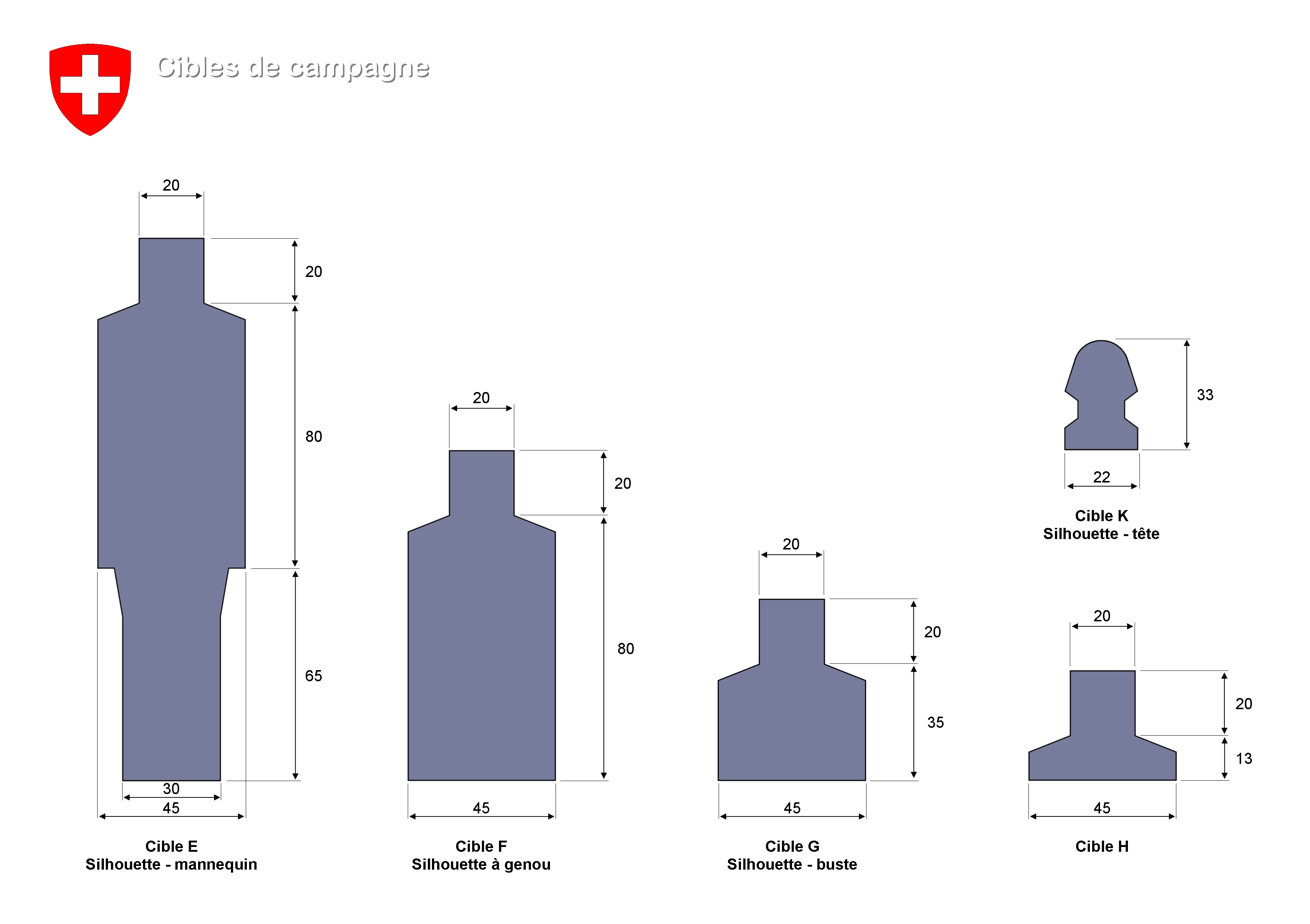
Swiss military targets

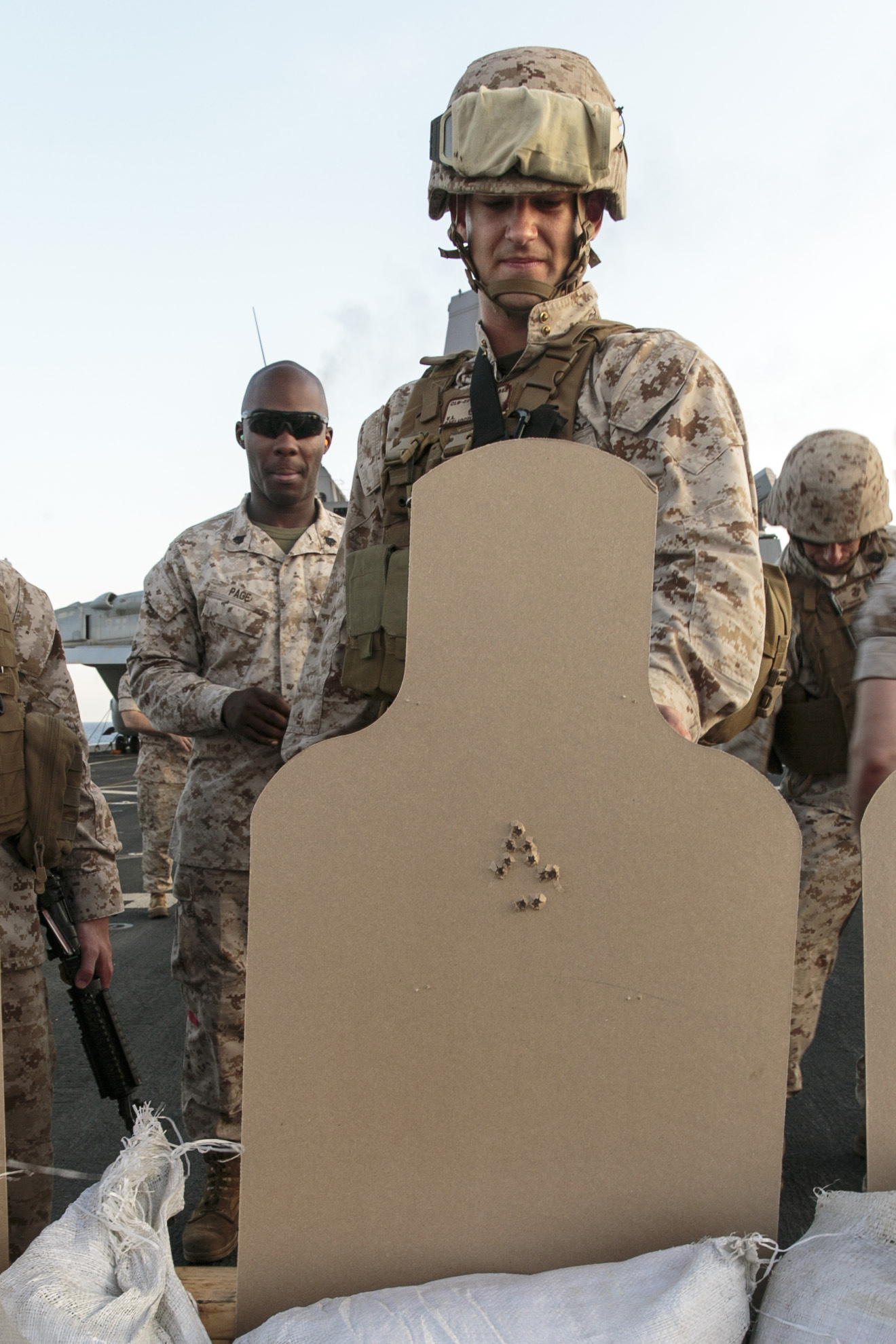

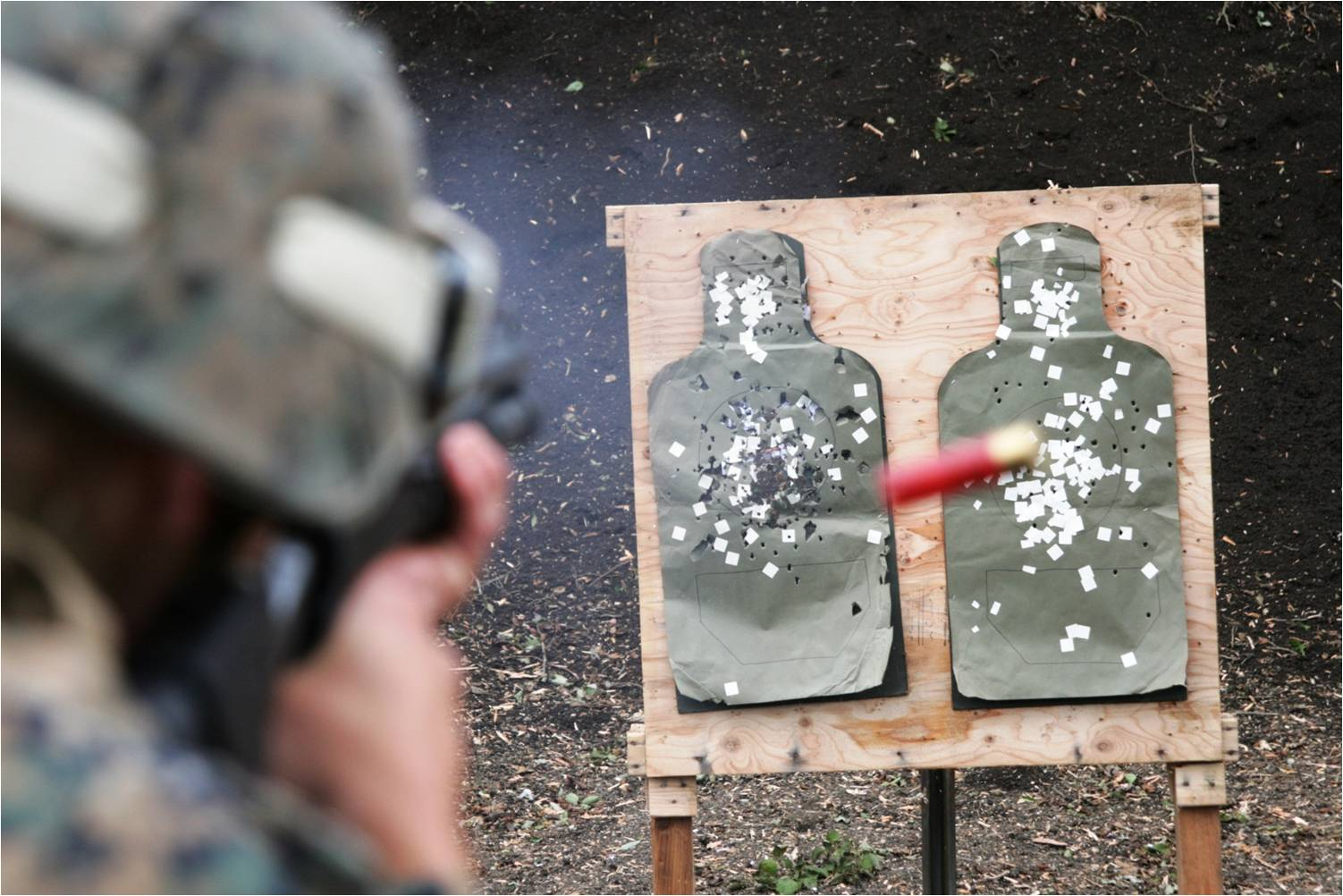

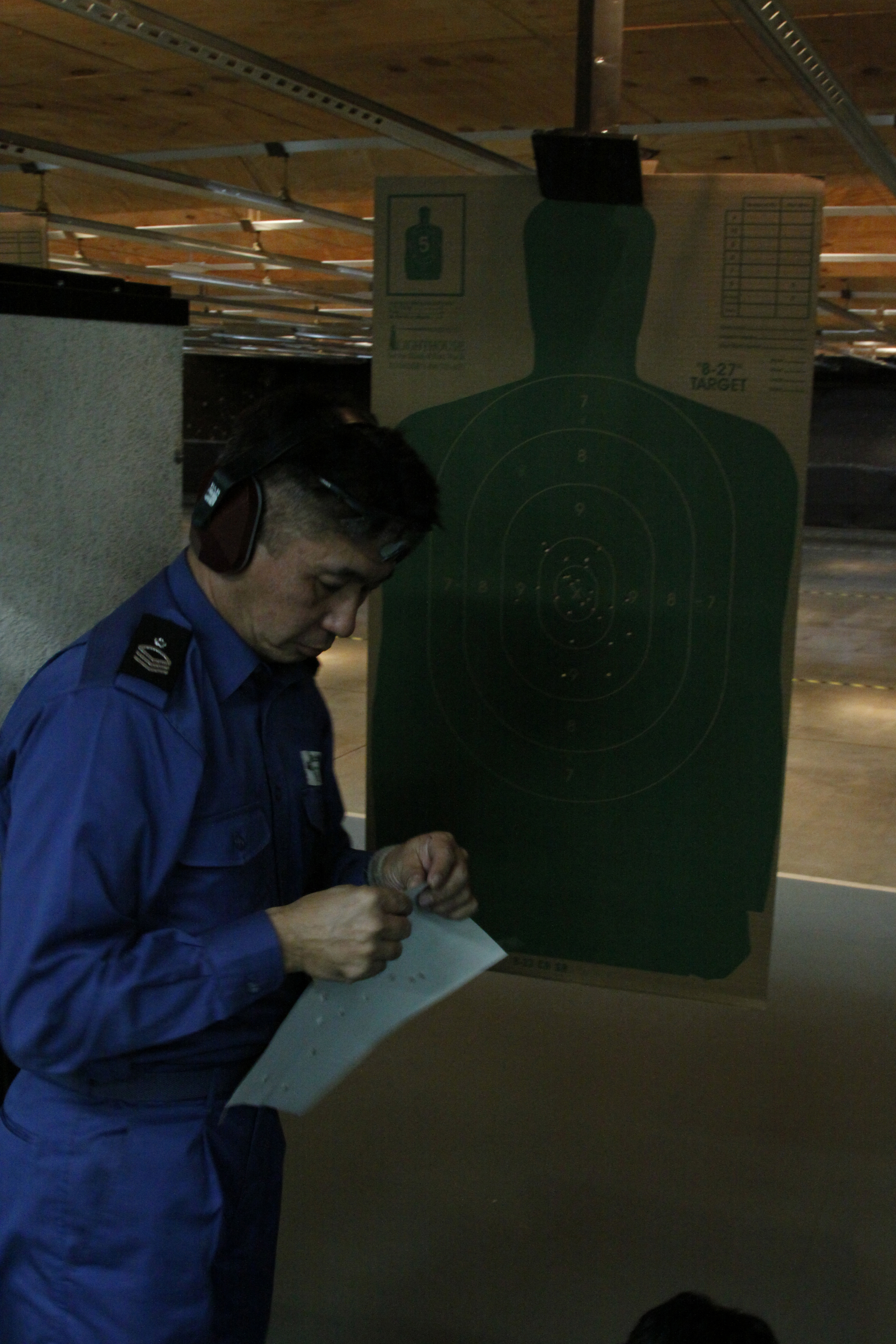

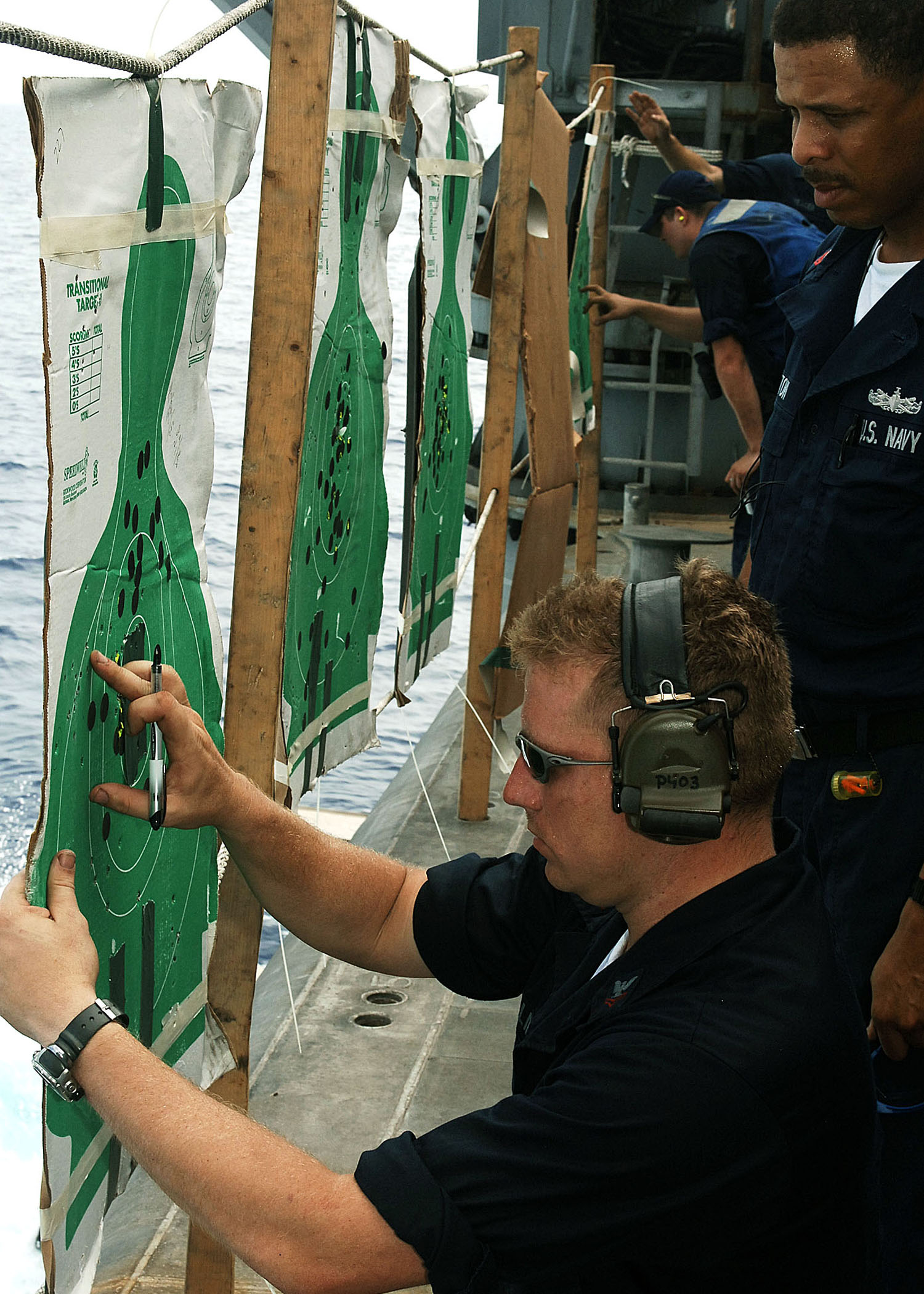

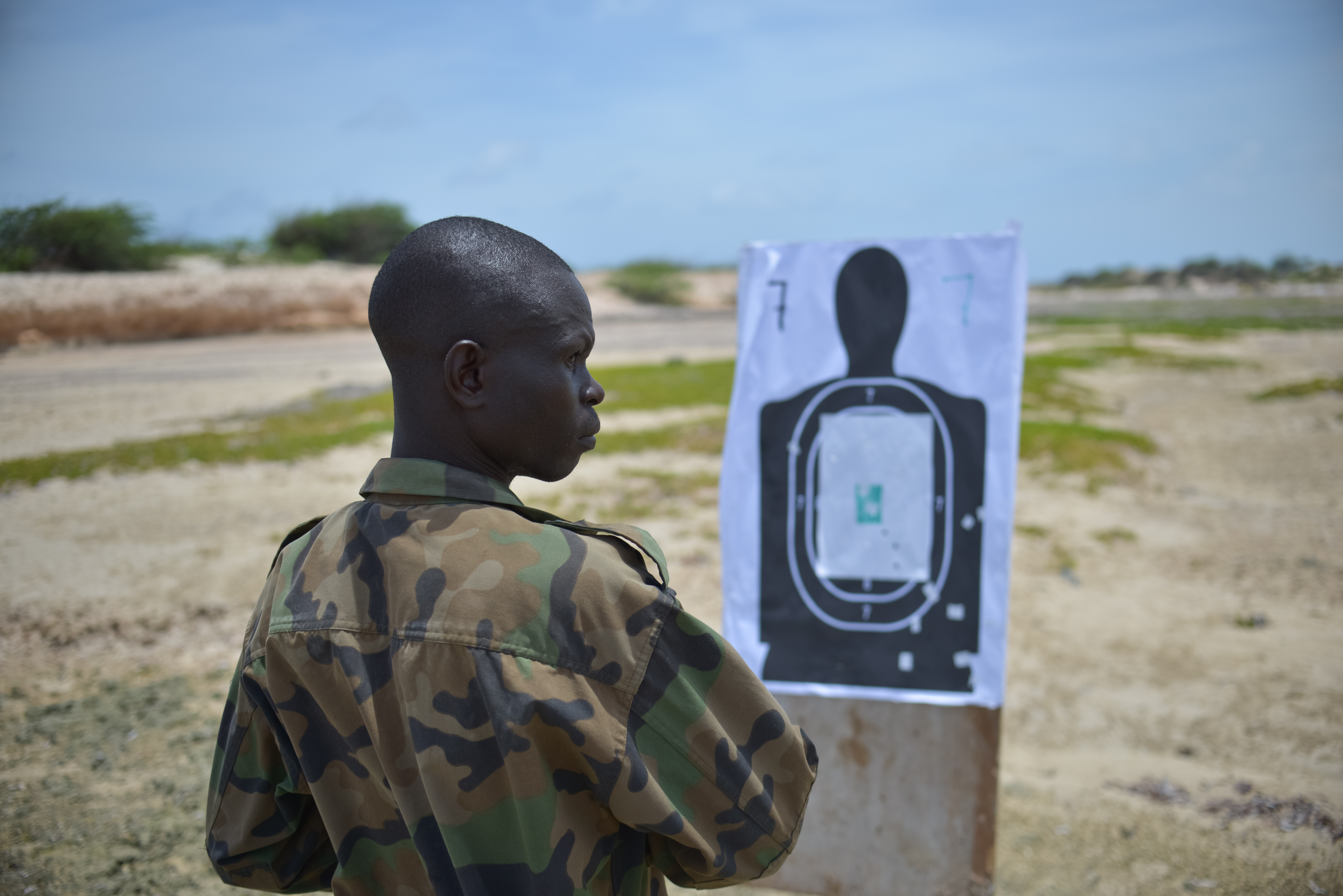

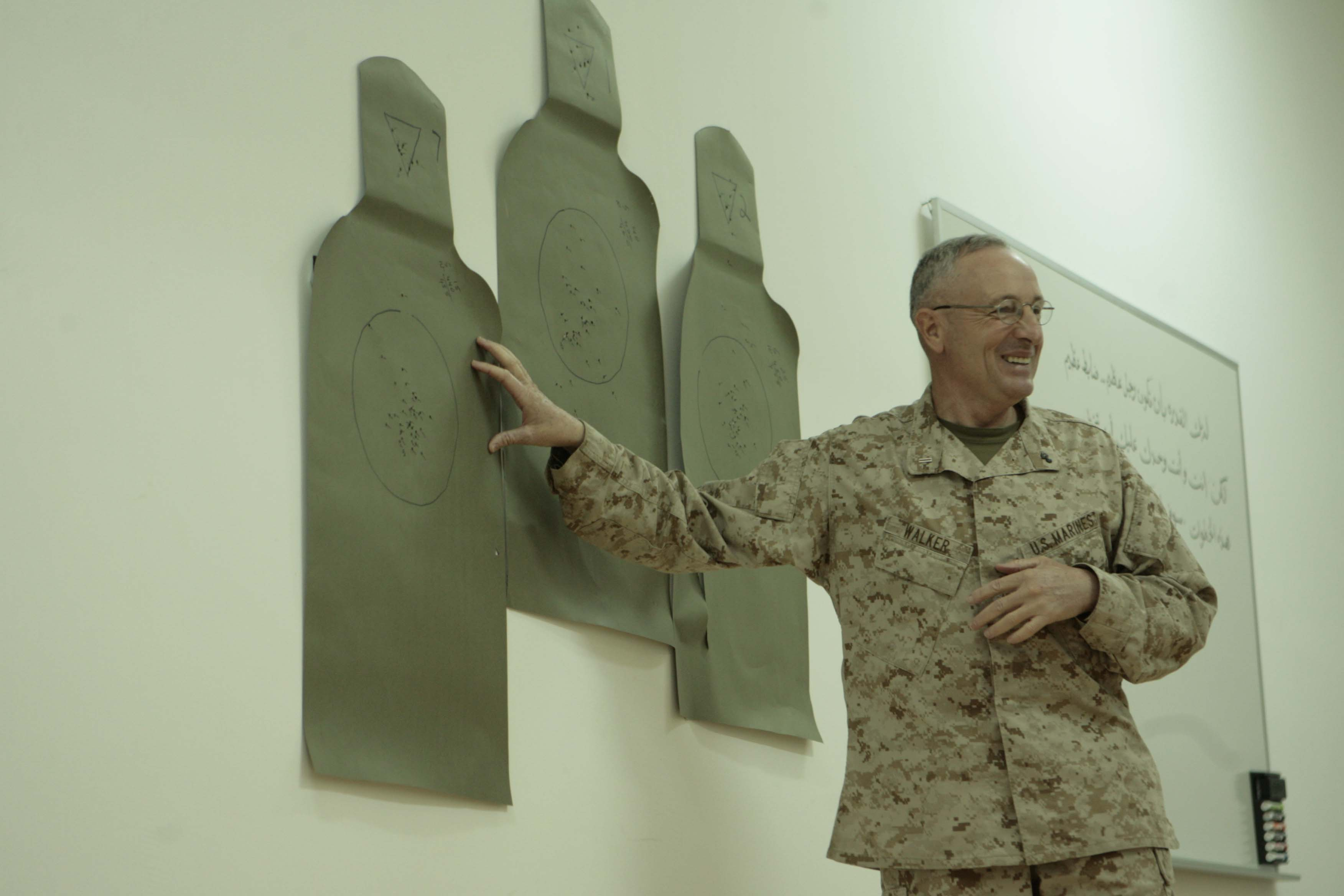

== Mannequins ==
Mannequins are sold for use as practice targets. Examples include The Ex, which resembles a woman, and another resembling former United States President Barack Obama.

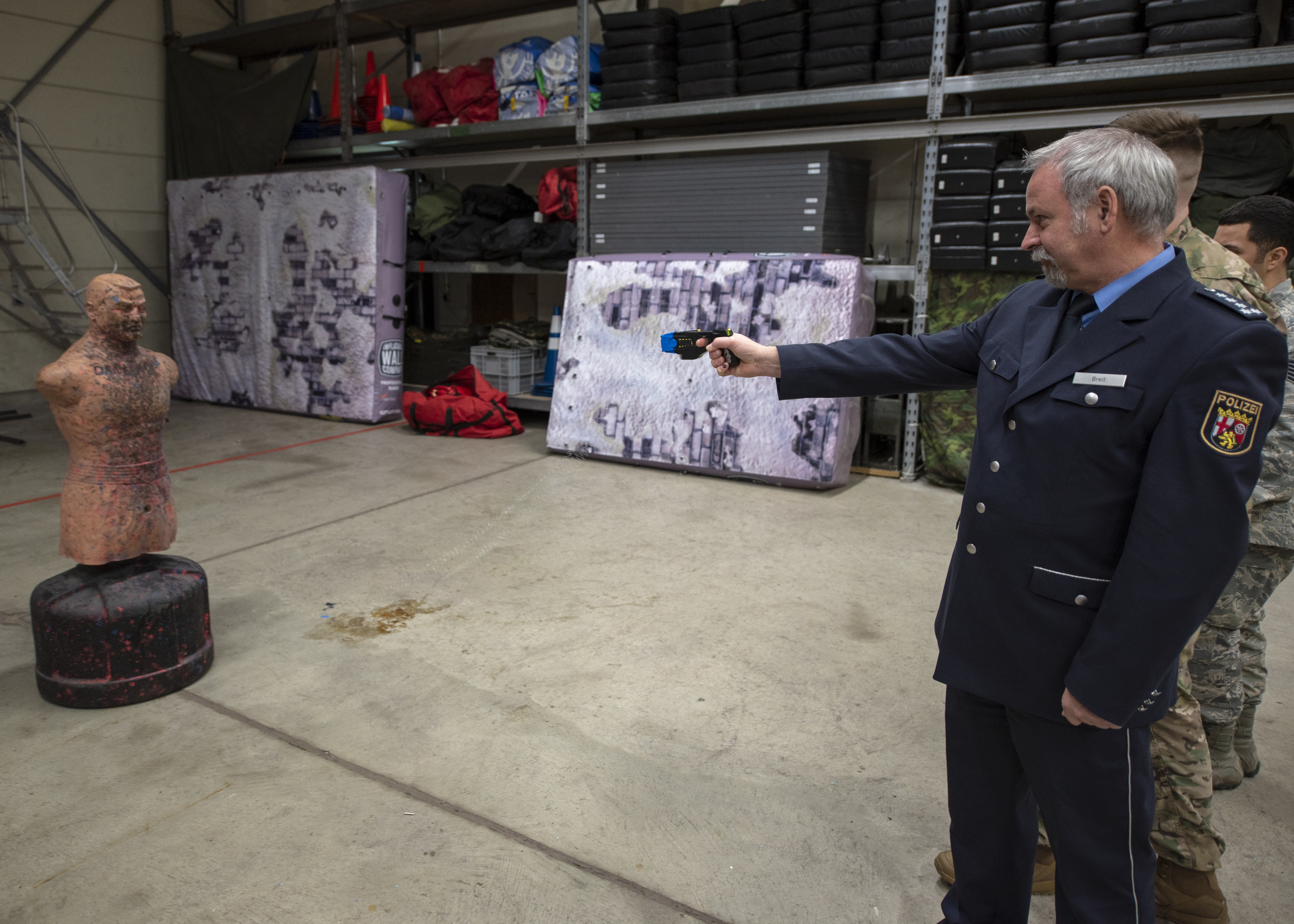
A German police chief shooting a taser at a training mannequin

== See also ==
- Electronic target
- Shot grouping
- Plinking
- Scoring gauge
- Steel target
- Texas sharpshooter fallacy
