= The Ex (target) =

Discontinued shooting target mannequin

The Ex after it was hit using "Macho Gaucho" rounds (a type of 12-gauge shell) from a distance of five yards

The Ex, also known as the Ex-Girlfriend, and now renamed to Alexa Zombie, is a discontinued mannequin produced by Zombie Industries as a shooting target. The mannequin's name, and the fact that it spouted blood when shot, caused controversy.

The target received attention after the National Rifle Association of America requested that Zombie Industries remove another target that resembled Barack Obama from a vendor booth at the organization's 2013 convention. It was criticized by domestic violence organizations including UltraViolent, as well as the Law Center to Prevent Gun Violence, but the manufacturer claimed that it was not intended to promote violence against women.

== Doll ==
The Ex was a mannequin target with fair skin and a pink bra showing through a white t-shirt. It was designed to bleed when struck by bullets. Other zombie-themed targets manufactured by Zombie Industries have a green or grey skin tone, and the Ex was noted for being the one that looked the most like a living human.

== Reactions ==
The target became known after another one of Zombie Industries' targets was criticized for resembling the then President Barack Obama. The company had displayed their bleeding targets at the 2013 conference of the National Rifle Association of America (NRA). Groups opposed to domestic violence criticized the target and started a campaign against its manufacturer. Amazon withdrew the target from sale.

Zombie Industries said that they included women as targets because doing otherwise would be sexist. The company said that it did not wish to discriminate against or promote violence against women. Amid criticism, Zombie Industries renamed the doll Alexa Zombie and promised to redesign the target to make it look distinct from a human woman. The company denied reports that they had displayed the target in their booth at the NRA convention.
